= Geography of Franz Josef Land =

Location of Franz Josef Land

Map of Franz Josef Land

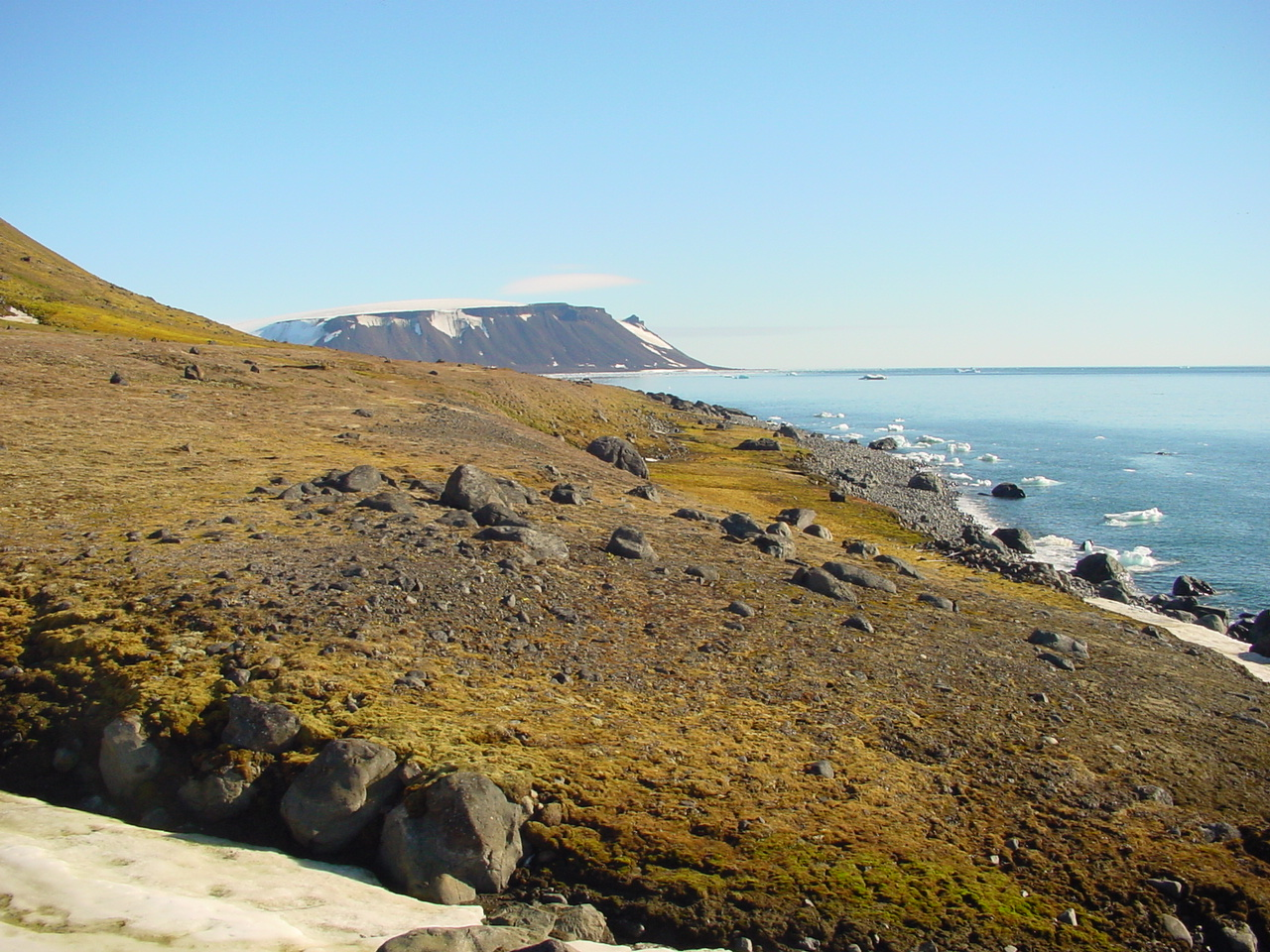
Northbrook Island

The Geography of Franz Josef Land refers to an island group belonging to Arkhangelsk Oblast of Russia. It is situated in the Barents Sea of the Arctic, north of Novaya Zemlya and east of Svalbard. At latitudes between 80.0° and 81.9° north, it is the most northerly group of islands associated with Eurasia. The extreme northernmost point is Cape Fligely on Rudolf Island. The archipelago consists of 191 ice-covered islands with a total area of 16,134 km^{2} (6,229 sq mi). It is currently uninhabited. The archipelago is only 900 to 1,110 km (560 to 690 miles) from the North Pole, and the northernmost islands are closer to the Pole than any other land except for Canada's Ellesmere Island and Greenland. The largest island is Zemlya Georga (George Land) which measures 110 km (68 mi) from end to end. The highest point in the archipelago is on Ostrov Viner-Neyshtadt (Wiener Neustadt Island) which reaches 620 m (2,034 ft) above sea level. The central cluster of large islands in the midst of the archipelago forms a compact whole, known as Zichy Land, where islands are separated from each other by very narrow sounds that are frozen most of the year.

During the period 1926 and 1932 Franz Josef Land also known in Russian as Zemlya Franca Josepha became a part of the Soviet Union and is included under the Arkhangelsk Oblast. In 1994, it was declared the Sakasnik Nature Reserve covering an area of 42,000 square kilometres (16,000 sq mi) including area of the sea surrounding the land but with restricted entry only on special permit which is not given easily; out of this area, 50 square kilometres (19 sq mi) area around the military base of Nagurskoye on the Alexandra Land is totally out of bounds.

== Landforms ==
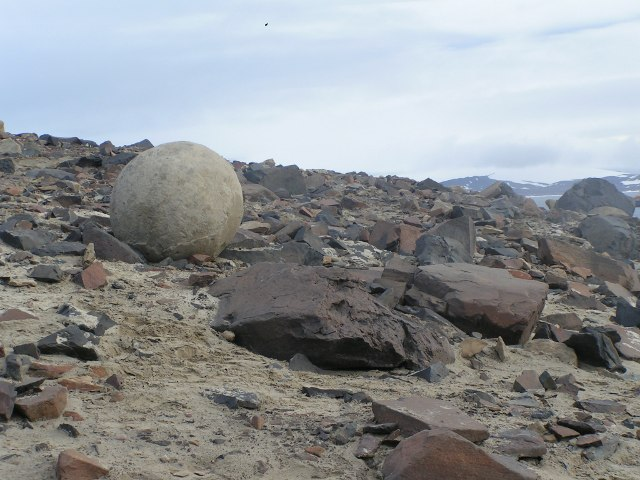
Cannonball concretion (spherical rocks) on Champ Island, Franz Josef Land

The archipelago is located at the nearest about 900 kilometres (560 mi) from the North Pole, far beyond the Polar Circle. The group's 191 islands measure 16,135 square kilometres (6,230 sq mi). They extend over a length of 234 kilometres (145 mi) in the north–south direction and 350 kilometres (220 mi) in the east–west direction. There are flat mountains in the range of 400–490 metres (1,310–1,610 ft) above sea level. The general lie of the land is in the elevation range between 300 metres (980 ft) in the north and 600 metres (2,000 ft) in the south with Wilczek Land forming the highest land mass at an elevation of 670 metres (2,200 ft). The islands are covered with glaciers to the extent of 85%, with no land breaks, and the land area of all the islands is only about 20%, with a coastline measuring 4,425 kilometres (2,750 mi). There are multiple icebergs, with limited length of less than 400 metres (1,300 ft) and some of them are similar to the Antarctic tabular iceberg. Air borne radar measurements have recorded an ice layer of 400 metres (1,300 ft) in Graham Bell and Hall Islands; the thick ice cover on the islands is a phenomenon of the last 1000 years. As a result, the reindeer population has not survived in these islands. Moving down to the coastal region, where the ice disappears, many lakes and ponds are seen. But as this area is very limited only small streams are noted, the largest extending only 19 kilometres (12 mi) in length on Prince George Island.

== Islands ==
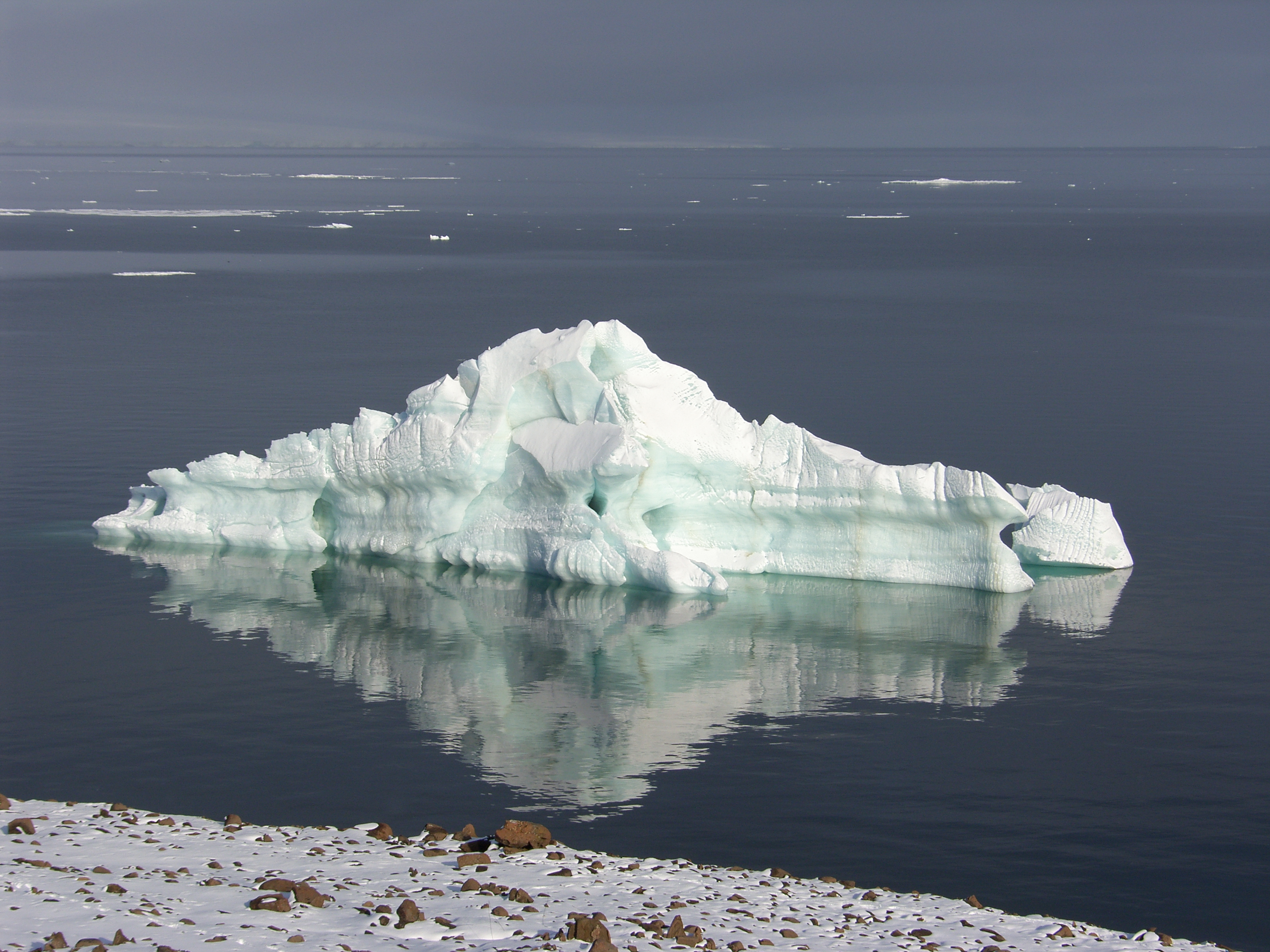
View near the Polar Geophysical Observatory on Heiss Island

Franz Josef Land comprises some 191 more or less ice-covered islands with a total area of about 16,134 km^{2} (6,229 sq mi); the area varying with the fluctuation of glaciers during rising or receding stages. Its two largest islands are Prince George Island and Wilczek Land, the former lies to the west and the latter to the east in the archipelago. Two geographic subgroups in Franz Joseph Land are Zemlya Zichy (Zichy Land), a large and compact glaciarized island cluster located in the middle of the archipelago containing ten large islands, and Belaya Zemlya, a group of three islands in the northeast named Hvidtenland ("White Land") by Fridtjof Nansen. Through the middle of these two groups runs the wide strait which von Payer named the Austrian Strait, in honour of his country. Rudolph Island is the nearest to the North Pole. The largest island, Zemlya Georga (George Land) measures 110 km (68 mi) from end to end. The highest point in the archipelago is on Ostrov Viner-Neyshtadt (Wiener Neustadt Island) which reaches 620 m (2,034 ft) above sea level.

The archipelago is divided in at least three subgroups:

- Western islands, west of the British Channel and De Bruyne Sound;
- Eastern islands, east of the Northeastern Sound, Beryozkina Channel and Austrian Strait;
- Central islands, everything in between these two.

The central islands again split in the minor groups:

- Northern islands, north of the Markham Sound;
- Southern islands, south of the Markham Sound.

=== Largest islands ===
Name	Sub group	Area (km^{2})	Elevation (m)
Alexandra Land	Western islands	1050	382
Prince George Land	Western islands	2821	416
Bruce Island	Western islands	191	301
Northbrook Island	Western islands	254	344
Prince Rudolf Island	Northern islands	297	461
Karl-Alexander Island	Northern islands	329	365
Rainer Island	Northern islands	140	284
Jackson Island	Northern islands	510	481
Payer Island	Northern islands	151	452
Greely Island	Northern islands	149	447
Salisbury Island	Northern islands	960	450
Ziegler Island	Northern islands	448	554
Wiener Neustadt Island	Northern islands	237	620
Luigi Island	Northern islands	371	442
Champ Island	Northern islands	374	507
Heiss Island	Northern islands	132	242
Hall Island	Southern islands	1049	502
MacKlintok Island	Southern islands	612	521
Salm Island	Southern islands	344	343
Hooker Island	Southern islands	460	576
Eva-Liv Island	Eastern islands	288	381
La Ronciere Island	Eastern islands	478	431
Wilczek Land	Eastern islands	2203	606
Graham Bell Island	Eastern islands	1557	509

=== Western islands ===
Western islands of Franz Josef Land

The western islands are separated from the other islands by the British Channel and De Bruyne Sound to the east. They include the large Alexandra Land and Prince George Land and the smaller Arthur, Bruce Island, Mabel, Bell, and Northbrook islands.

==== Alexandra Land ====
Alexandra Land is the westernmost island in the archipelago. It has an area of approximately 1,051 square kilometers (406 sq mi). The sounds Cambridge Sound to the east and Arkhangelsky Sound off the northeast coast separate it from Zemlya Georga (also known as Prince George Land) to the east. Its highest point is 382 metres (1,253 ft) in the centre of the island, and there is also a 31 metres (102 ft) peak near the northern coast. Cape Nimrod lies on its western coast, and Cape George Thomas on its northeastern coast on Arkhangelsky Sound. There is a base named Nagurskoye near its northern coast, named after Jan Nagórski, which served as one of the most important meteorological stations in the archipelago during the Cold War. The northernmost Russian Air Force base is in the Alexandra Island (though in a poor condition) with a small unit of security force is existing since 1955. Prior to this, the manned base station in the extreme north was in the Rudolph island which is defunct since 1955. It has a 1,500 meters (4,921 ft) snow runway. An Antonov An-72 cargo aircraft crashed while landing at Nagurskoye on 23 December 1996.

==== Prince George Land ====
Prince George Land (Zemlya Georga), lies to the east of Alexandra Island is the largest island of Franz Josef Land which measures 110 km (68 mi) from end to end. It has an area of 2,820.8 square kilometres (1,089.1 sq mi) and lies within latitude 80.50° N and longitude 49.50° E. Its mapped shore length is 635.9 kilometres (395.1 mi). The highest point is 416 metres (1,365 ft) in the northern-central part of the island. Jackson named the island "Prince George Land" after Queen Victoria's grandson. There are also peaks of 362 metres (1,188 ft) on its western side and 364 metres (1,194 ft) near the southwestern coast, northwest of Gray Bay. To the southeast of this is Nightingale Sound, which separates the island from the small islands of Bell island, Mabel Island and Bruce Island. To the north of this and off the east coast of Zemlya Georga is the British Channel, which has Hooker Island to the far southeast. Zemlya Georga has several capes on its northern end, including Cape Murray on the northeastern peninsula, Cape Bruce on the north-northeastern peninsula, and Cape Battenberg on the northern peninsula, marking the northernmost point of the island. Several streams during the summer season flow into the sea in the northwestern side, and Geographer Bay divides the northeastern and north-north eastern peninsulas. Off the north coast, Leigh Smith Sound separates Zemlya Georga from the small Arthur Island, which has a peak of 275 metres (902 ft) and the Cape Ice Reconnaissance on its northern coast.

=== Northern islands ===
Northern and Central islands of Franz Josef Land

The northern and central islands lie to the north of the De Bruyne Sound and Markham Sound and to the west of the Austrian Strait. They include Rudolf island to the north, the Zichy Land cluster of islands, and Heiss and Komsomol islands to the southeast.

==== Rudolf Island ====
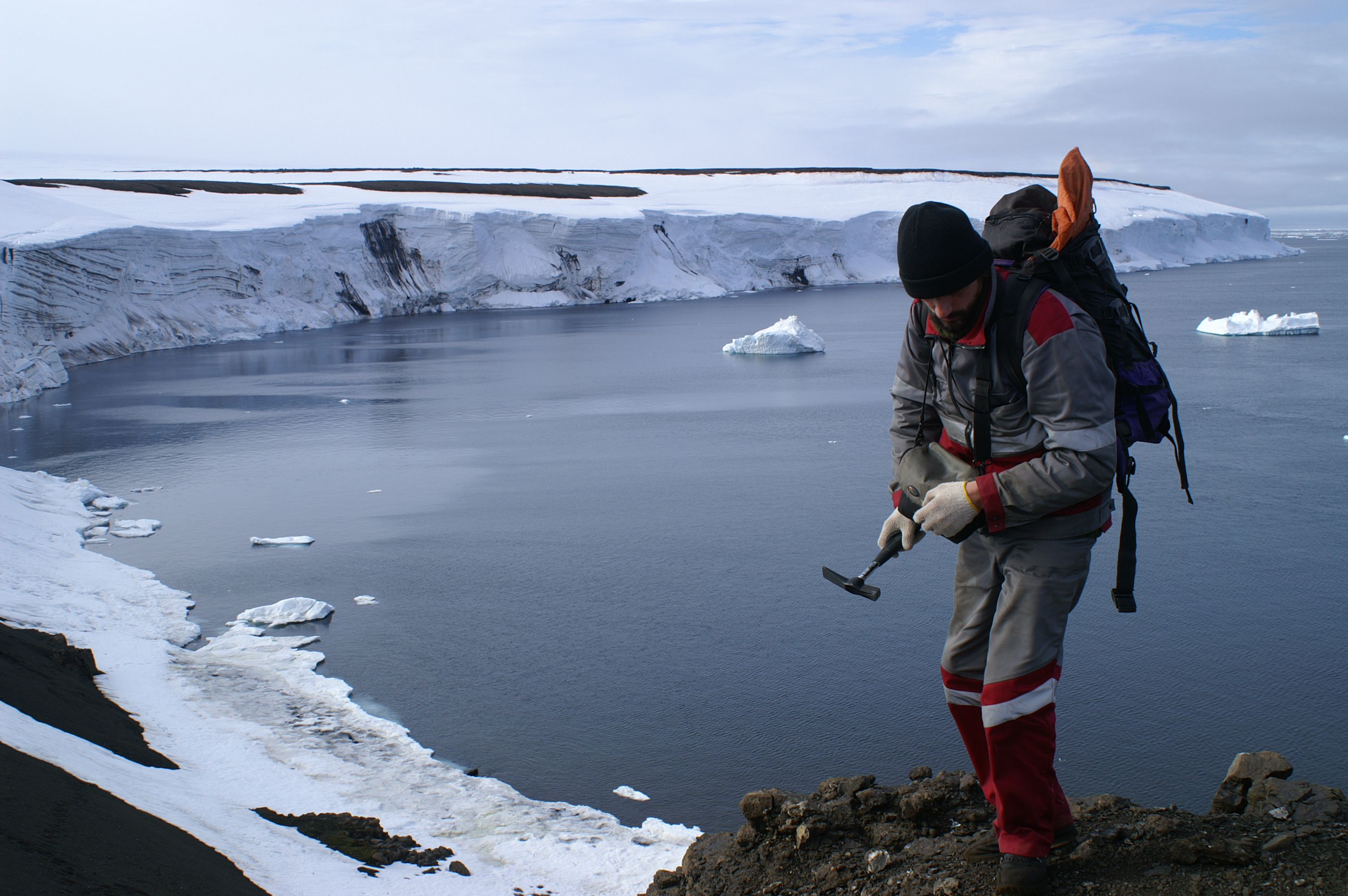
Rudolf Island

Cape Fligely on Rudolf Island at 81°52' N is the northernmost point of Franz Josef Land. Lieutenant Julius von Payer, an officer of the Austro-Hungarian army, cartographer, and mountaineer, planted an Austro-Hungarian flag at Cape Fligely during the 1874 expedition that discovered Franz Josef Land. The Baldwin-Ziegler expedition arrived in 1902 and established a depot, and the Fiala-Ziegler expedition set up camp here for two seasons. A meteorological station was set up in 1932 in coordination with International Polar Year (1932–3) but was evacuated in 1941. A later station functioned until 1995. Several pre-World War II Soviet stations existed in Teplitz Bay but little has remained according to the observations of the Kapitan Dranitsyn expedition in 2004.

==== Zichy Land ====
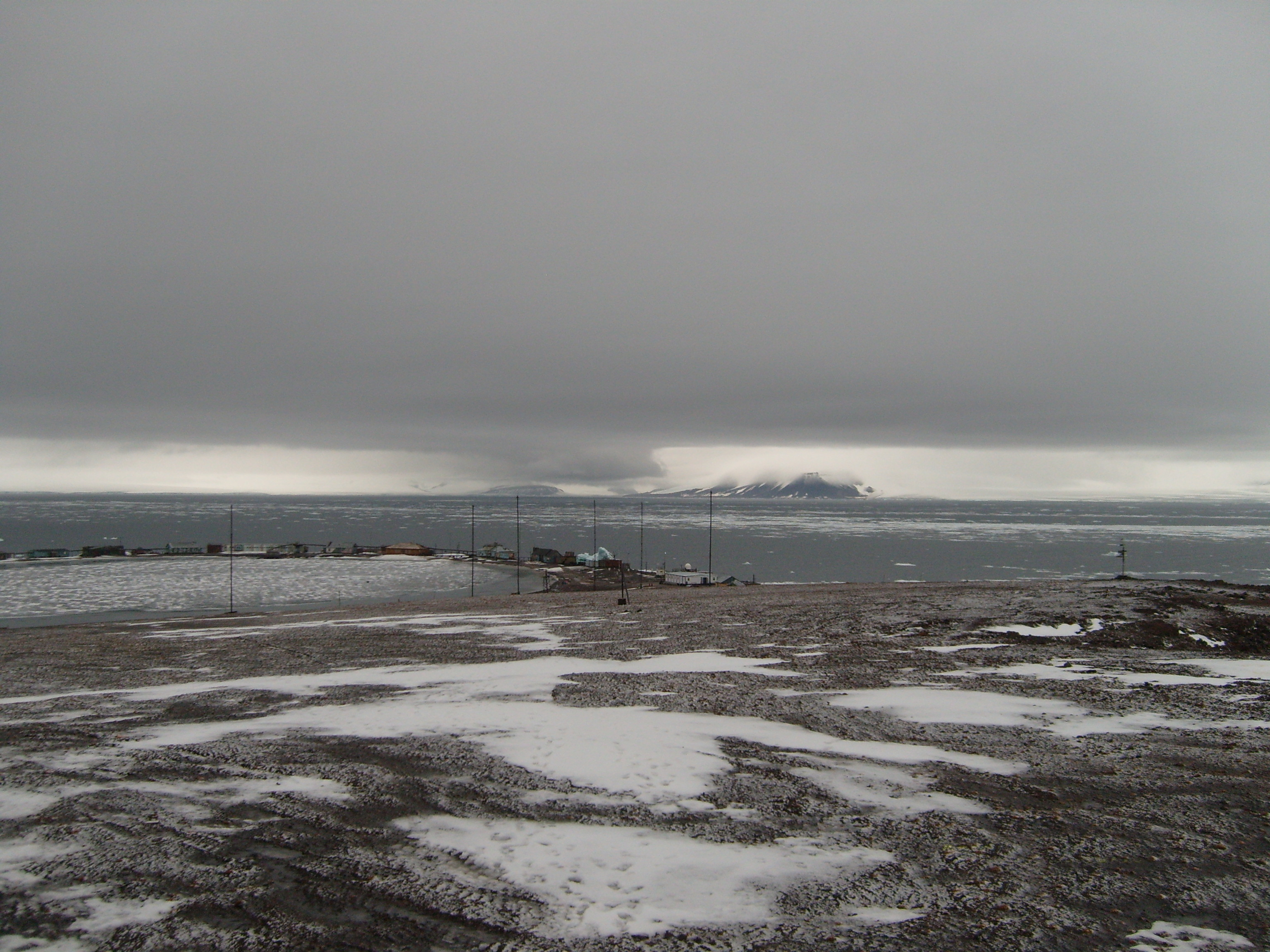
Wiener Neustadt Island

The islands of the Zemlya Zichy archipelago are separated from each other by very narrow sounds that are frozen most of the year, forming a compact whole. From north to south the main islands are Karl-Alexander Island, Rainer Island, Jackson Island, Payer Island, Greely Island, Ziegler Island, Salisbury Island, Wiener Neustadt Island, Luigi Island and Champ Island.

Karl-Alexander Island covers an area of 329.2 square kilometres (127.1 sq mi) with an elevation of 365 metres (1,198 ft) and its shoreline measures 87.7 kilometres (54.5 mi). Rainer Island has an area of 139.8 square kilometres (54.0 sq mi). The elevation of the island is 284 metres (932 ft), and it has a shoreline of 48.3 kilometres (30.0 mi) length. Jackson Island (Ostrov Dzheksona), discovered by Frederick George Jackson in May 1895, is 521.4 square kilometres (201.3 sq mi) in area; its highest elevation is 481 metres (1,578 ft) and its mapped shore length is 148.1 kilometres (92.0 mi). Greely Island, also Grili, encompasses an area of 127.2 square kilometres (49.1 sq mi) with a shore length of 52.8 kilometres (32.8 mi). Payer Island covers an area of 160 square kilometres (62 sq mi) with an altitude of 284 metres (932 ft), and has a shoreline extending over 59 kilometres (37 mi) length. Salisbury Island, also known as Solsberi Island, has an area of 959.6 square kilometres (370.5 sq mi) and the highest point is at an elevation of 482 metres (1,581 ft). The mapped shore length is 184.9 kilometres (114.9 mi).

Wiener Neustadt Island, also Viner-Noyshtadt or Viner N'Ojstadt, lies at 80.75°N 58.30°E. It has an area of 236.5 square kilometres (91.3 sq mi) and has a highest point of 620 metres (2,030 ft). Its shores extend over a length of 62.1 kilometres (38.6 mi). Luigi Island, also known as Ostrov Luidzhi, has a surface area of 370.6 square kilometres (143.1 sq mi); the highest point of the island is 468 metres (1,535 ft) and it has a shore line of 101.70 kilometres (63.19 mi). Champ Island has an area of 374.3 square kilometres (144.5 sq mi) and is at an elevation of 507 metres (1,663 ft) and its shore line measures 90.6 kilometres (56.3 mi).

==== Heiss and Komsomol ====
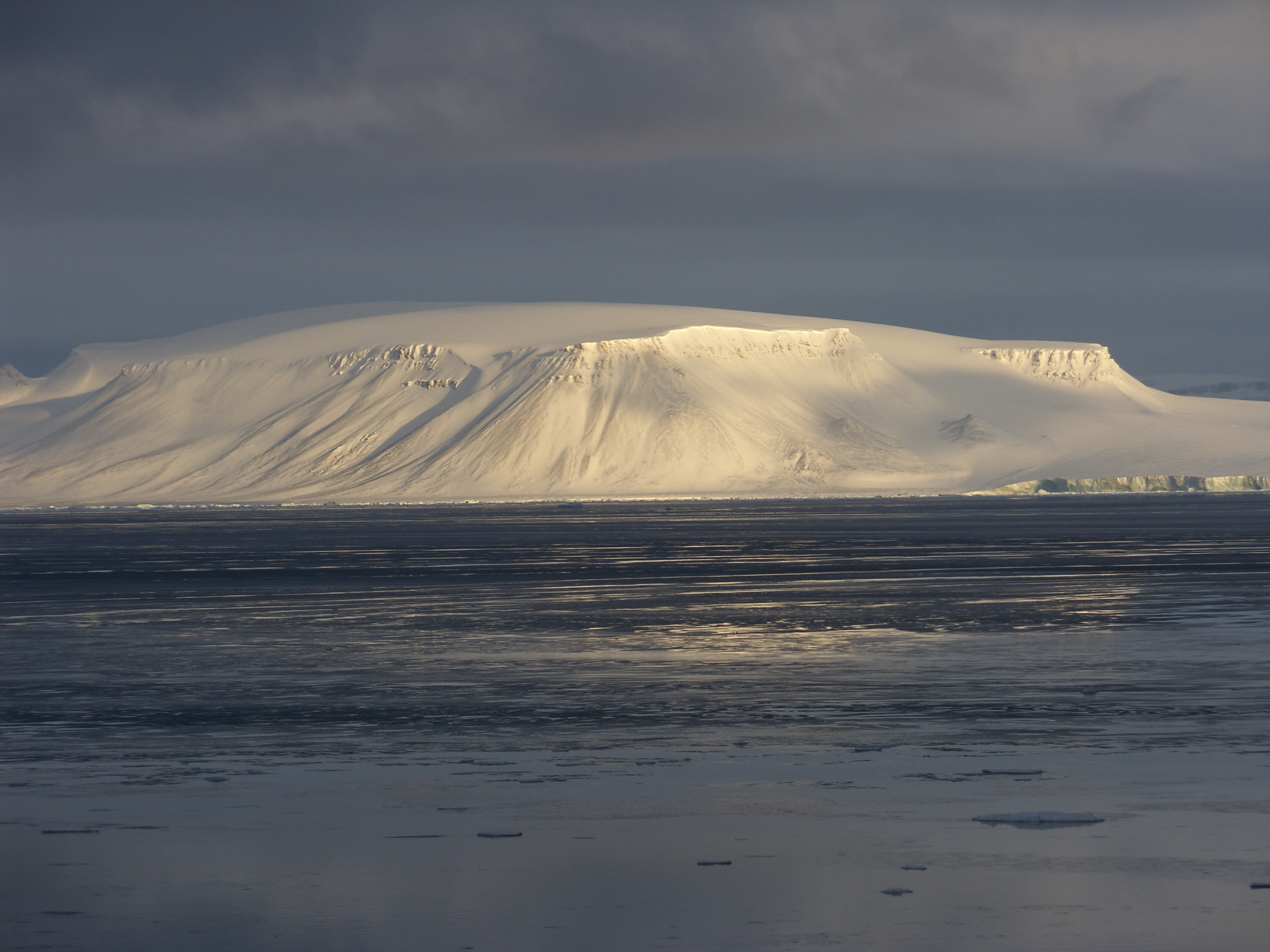
Heiss Island

Heiss Island and Komsomol Island lie southeast of Zichy land. The Austria Strait separates Hall Island from Komsomol and the large Wilczek Island further to the northeast. Heiss Island, also known as Kheysa or Chejsa island, is bound within latitude 80.55° N and longitude 57.50° E. It encompasses an area of 132.3 square kilometres (51.1 sq mi). Its mapped shore length is 55.2 kilometres (34.3 mi). The abandoned Kheysa, Soviet rocket launching site, was located on this island. In the Geophysical Year 1957–58, a new meteorological station, which over the years became the largest such station, was established on the banks of a small crater lake in the ice free zone of this island and named after Ernst Krenkel, an Arctic explorer. The station was closed in 2000 and abandoned buildings are still seen here. Another weather station was established in 2005. The island is named after the Arctic explorer, Isaac Israel Hayes.

=== Southern islands ===
Southern islands of Franz Josef Land

The southern islands lies east of De Bruyne Sound, and south of British Channel, Markham Sound and Austrian Strait. They include the larger Hooker, McClintock, Hall and Salm islands, and many smaller islands.

==== Hooker Island ====
Hooker Island, named after British naturalist Sir Joseph Dalton Hooker, lies to the southeast of Zemlya Georga, across the British Channel. It has an area of 459.8 square kilometres (177.5 sq mi) and lies within latitude 80.25° N and longitude 53.00° E. The highest point on the island is at an elevation of 576 metres (1,890 ft) and its mapped shore length is 117.5 kilometres (73.0 mi). A graveyard and two modern buildings exist. On Hooker Island's western side there is a bay in an un-glaciated area, Tikhaya Bay (80°20′N 52°47′E). A large seabird colony exists near Tikhaya Bay at Skala Rubini (80°18′N 52°50′E), a spectacular rock formation on Hooker Island's shore. Tikhaya Bay was the site of a major base for polar expeditions, and the location of a meteorological station from 1929 to 1963. There is another bay in the south of the island called Zaliv Makarova and another in the east known as Ledn. To the southwest, De Bruyne Sound separates the island from Northbrook Island. To the north, the Young Sound separates the island from the islands of Koetlitz, Nansen, Pritchett, and several others.

There are a number of islands surrounding Hooker Island. Scott-Keltie Island, with a highest point of 64 metres (210 ft), is an island off the northwest coast, and is named in honor of Scottish geographer Sir John Scott Keltie (1840–1927). 10 kilometres (6.2 mi) beyond this, lying to the west of Scott-Keltie Island in the British Channel, is Eaton Island, a small, 3 kilometres (1.9 mi) long island. This island, which appears as Ostrov Itol in many Russian maps, was named after British scientist Rev. Alfred Edwin Eaton (1844–1929). May Island is a small island lying 5 kilometres (3.1 mi) off the south coast; to the southwest of this Etheridge Island, and to the southeast is Newton Island, 11 kilometres (6.8 mi) offshore, named in honor of Alfred Newton. Leigh-Smith Island lies east of Hooker island, separated from it by a 6 kilometres (3.7 mi) wide sound called Proliv Smitsona. It is 14 kilometres (8.7 mi) long and has a maximum width of 6.5 kilometres (4.0 mi). The island's highest point is 309 metres (1,014 ft) and its surface is wholly glacierized except for a small area at its northern point and another around Mys Bitterburga', its southernmost cape. This island is named after British yachtsman and explorer Benjamin Leigh Smith. West of Leigh-Smith Island's northern end, off Hooker island's northeastern shore, there is a smaller island known as Royal Society Island, named after the Royal Geographical Society. It is 6 kilometres (3.7 mi) long and has a maximum width of 2.5 kilometres (1.6 mi).

==== MacKlintok Island ====
MacKlintok Island or McClintock Island, named after Irish explorer of the Arctic Francis Leopold McClintock, lies to the east of Brady Island, which lies to the east of Leigh-Smith Island and Hooker Island. This island, located within latitude 80.20° N and longitude 54.80° E, is roughly square-shaped. Its maximum length is 33 km (21 mi) and its mapped shore length is 120.4 km (74.8 mi). Its area is 611.5 km^{2} (236.1 sq mi), It is largely glaciated. The island's highest point is 521 m (1,709 ft) in the eastern-central part of the island, and there is a 481 metres (1,578 ft) peak near the northeastern coast. The island is located very close to the west of Hall Island, separated from it by a narrow sound, Proliv Negri. The island's northernmost point is Mys Grili (Greely Cape) and the southeastern is Mys Oppoltsera (Cape Oppholtzer).

Alger Island and the smaller Mathilda Island lies off MacKlintok Island's northern shore, separated from Alger by a 3 km (1.9 mi) narrow sound. Its highest point is near the centre at 429 metres (1,407 ft). Brady Island off the west coast is a relatively large island and is mostly glaciated. It is located west of MacKlintok Island's northwestern tip, separated from it by the 6 km (3.7 mi) wide Aberdare Sound (Proliv Abyerder). The highest point on Brady Island is 381 m (1,250 ft); it was named after the English scientist Henry Bowman Brady. Mys Vize, Brady Island's northernmost cape, is named after Russian Arctic expert Vladimir Wiese. There are also several islands off the southern shore including the Ostrova Borisika islets and Aagaard Island, 5 km (3.1 mi) off the southern coast, named in honor of Bjarne Aagaard, a Norwegian expert on Antarctic whaling and exploration.

==== Alger Island ====
Alger Island, (Russian: остров Алджер, romanized: ostrov Aldzher), is a small island at latitude 80° 23′ N and longitude 56.00° E. It divides the south-central islands and the north-central group, and is located to the south of Markham Strait. McClintock Island lies to its south. Discovered in August 1899 by the Walter Welmann expedition, it was named after Russell A. Alger, US Secretary of War. The coastline is fairly ice free. In 1901, Evelyn Briggs Baldwin established a camp here and named it Camp Ziegler, after William Ziegler, who had sponsored the expedition.

==== Hall Island ====
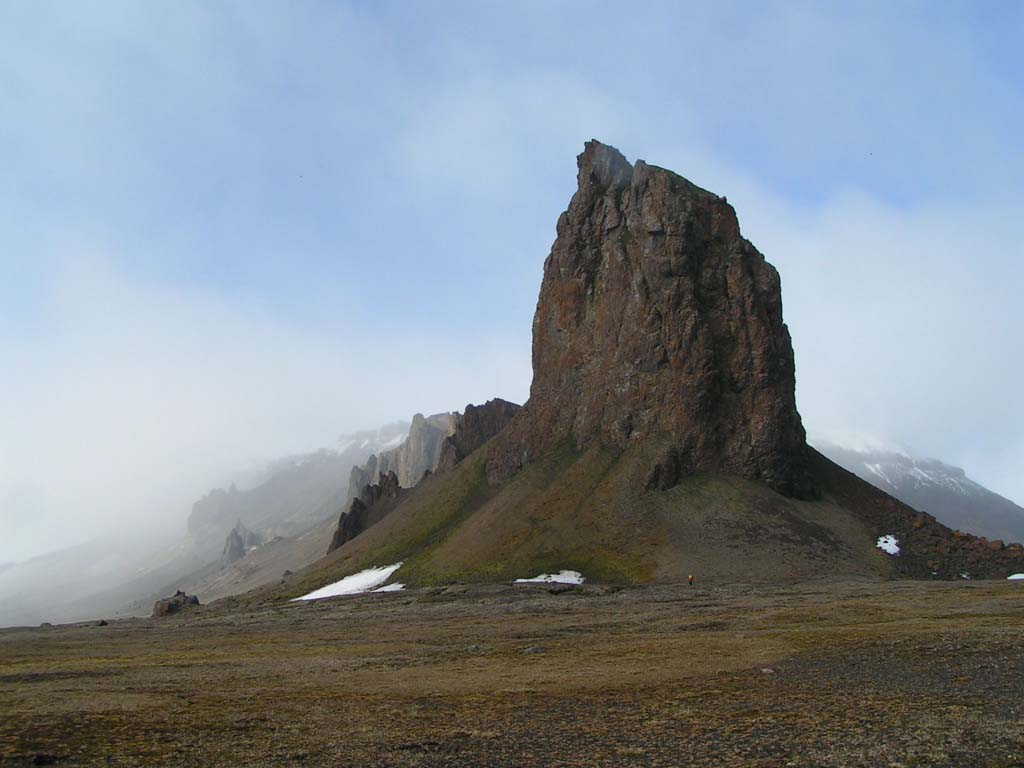
View of Cape Tegetthoff

Hall Island (Ostrov Gallya) is an almost completely glacierized large island of 1,049 km^{2} (405 sq mi) immediately to the east of MacKlintok Island. It lies within latitude 80.30° N and longitude 56.00° E. The highest point on the island is 502 m (1,647 ft) and its mapped shore length is 174.7 km (108.6 mi). It was named after American Arctic explorer Charles Francis Hall. The only relatively large areas free of permanent ice are located in its southern end, where there are two headlands, Cape Tegetthoff, and Cape Ozernyy, on the Littov Peninsula. Cape Tegetthoff has a range of hill peaks. The airborne surveys revealed 400 metres (1,300 ft) thick mantles of ice and also in Graham Bell Island's ice capes. There is also a very small unglacierized area around its eastern cape, Cape Frankfurt, and another in its northwestern point, Cape Wiggins. Its highest point is 502 m (1,647 ft) near its southwestern side, and there is also a peak of 421 metres (1,381 ft) in the northcentral part of the island. There is a wide bay on the southeastern side of Hall Island known as Hydrographer Bay and a smaller one west of the Littov Peninsula, known as Bukhta Surovaya. To the southeast, there is a wider strait separating Hall Island from Salm Island, known as Proliv Lavroka. The strait to the east is known as Austrian Strait.

Just off the northern shore of Hall Island lie three small islets known as the Brown Islands, named in honor of George Brown of the Royal Navy, who participated in the 1850–1854 expedition in search of Sir John Franklin on the Investigator. 6 km (3.7 mi) to the west of Hall island's northwestern cape lies the oval-shaped 5 km (3.1 mi) long Newcomb Island, with a highest point of 67 m (220 ft). This island was named after Raymond Lee Newcomb, the naval officer in charge of the ill-fated DeLong expedition on the Jeannette. 1.5 km (0.93 mi) off the northeastern side of Hall Island's eastern bay lies the small but steep Berghaus Island, reaching a height of 372 m (1,220 ft). Unglacierized, this island was named after cartographer Heinrich Berghaus (1797–1884).

Sal'm Island, located on the wide strait of the Payer Austrian channel, encompasses an area of 343.7 square kilometres (132.7 sq mi) with an altitude or 343 metres (1,125 ft) and the shore length is 76.9 kilometres (47.8 mi).

=== Eastern islands ===
Eastern islands of Franz Josef Land

The easterns islands lie to the east of the Austrian Strait, and include Wilczek Island, La Ronciere Island, and Graham Bell Island.

==== Eva-Liv Island ====
Eva-Liv Island, also Yeva-Liv or Jeva Liv, is the northeastern extremity of Franz Josef Land at 81.62°N 62.96°E. It covers an area of 287.6 kilometres (178.7 mi). It has an altitude of 381 metres (1,250 ft) and a mapped shore length of 75.2 kilometres (46.7 mi). The island was discovered by Nansen and Johansen on 24 July 1895. Nansen thought there were two islands, and named them after his wife and daughter. In 1905 it was found that "Eva" and "Liv" were in fact one island.

==== Graham Bell Island ====
Graham Bell Island, the easternmost island of Franz Josef Land, is immediately to the northeast of Wilczek Land across the Morgan Strait and is one of the larger islands in the archipelago, with an area of 1,557 square kilometres (601 sq mi). Partially glaciated, its highest point is 509 metres (1,670 ft) near the southern centre. Cape Kohlsaat, the easternmost point of the archipelago at 81°14′N, 65°10′E, lies on Graham Bell Island's eastern shore. Cape Kohlsaat marks the northwesternmost corner of the Kara Sea, therefore it is a significant geographical landmark. Cape Leiter lies on the south point of the island. This island was named after inventor Alexander Graham Bell. Graham Bell Island should not be confused with the smaller Bell Island which is also part of the Franz Josef archipelago. Graham Bell Island is home to a Cold War outpost (shut down in 1994) and the airfield 'Greem Bell' with a 2,100 m (6,900 ft) runway. This small island is mostly ice free and has a lagoon in the backdrop of a bell shaped mountain. The log cabin built by Benjamin Leigh Smith in 1881 is a well preserved cabin even now and is the oldest house on the land though unoccupied.

Graham Bell Island's northern shore is fringed by clusters of very small islets. Three-ray Island lies off the western coast. Ostrov Perlamutrovyy (Pyerlamutrov Island) lies off the southeastern shore of Graham Bell Island, the 2 kilometres (1.2 mi) long Ostrov Trëkhluchevoy lies off its western shore, and Ostrov Udachnyy is part of a cluster of islets located along the northwestern shore.

==== Wilczek Land ====
Wilczek Land is barren and its basaltic rock cliffs are exposed. It lies to the northeast of Hall Island, across the Austrian Strait. It is the second largest island of the Franz Josef Archipelago and is almost completely glaciarized except for two narrow areas along its western shores. The highest point on the island is 606 metres (1,988 ft), in the western central part. This large island is named after Austro-Hungarian Count Johann Nepomuk Wilczek, involved in the Austro-Hungarian North Pole Expedition. This island should not be confused with small Wilczek Island, located southwest of Salm Island and named after the same person. Mys Ganza is Wilczek Land's westernmost cape. Cape Geller was the wintering site for two members of the 1899 Wellman expedition. Left with minimal supplies, one of them did not survive.

Off Wilczek Land's southern bay lies the small Klagenfurt Island, about 9 kilometres (5.6 mi) away from the shore, named after Klagenfurt, the capital of Carinthia. McNult Island lies just off the southeastern cape, with several other islets. Just off the eastern coast of Wilczek Land lie two small islets called Ostrova Gorbunova, named after Russian naturalist Gregory Petrovich Gorbunov. The northern side of Wilczek is separated from La Ronciere Island by a straight known as Vanderbilt. The small island of Geddes lies off the northwestern point. To the east, Wilczek Land is separated from Graham Bell Sound by the Morgan Straight.

=== List of Islands ===
Islands of Franz Josef Land include:

- Aagaard Island
- Adelaide Island
- Alexander Islands
- Alexandra Land
- Alger Island
- Arthur Island
- Becker Island
- Belaya Zemlya
- Bell Island
- Berghaus Island
- Bliss Island
- Brice Island
- Brosch Island
- Bruce Island
- Bromwich Island
- Brady Island
- Champ Island
- Chichagov Islands
- Coburg Island
- David Island
- Davis Island
- Derevyannyy Island
- Eaton Island
- Elizabeth Island
- Etheridge Islands
- Eva Island
- Freeden Island
- Geddes Island
- George Land
- Gogenloe Island
- Gorbunov Islands
- Graham Bell Island
- Greely Island
- Hall Island
- Harley Island
- Heiss Island
- Hochstetter Islands
- Hofmann Island
- Hooker Island
- Howen Island
- Jackson Island
- Jefferson Island
- Karl-Alexander Island
- Koetlitz Island
- Kane Island
- Klagenfurt Island
- Koldewey Island
- Komsomol Islands
- Kuchin Islands
- Kuhn Island
- Lamont Island
- La Ronciere Island
- Levanevsky Island
- Leigh-Smith Island
- Litke Island
- Luigi Island
- McClintock Island
- McNult Island
- Mabel Island
- May Island
- Nansen Island
- Newcomb Island
- Newton Island
- Northbrook Island
- Ostrovov Oktyabryata
- Ommanney Island
- Payer Island
- Pontremoli Islands
- Pritchett Island
- Pyerlamutrov Island
- Querini Island
- Rainer Island
- Robertson Island
- Royal Society Island
- Rudolf Island
- Salisbury Island
- Salm Island
- Schönau Island
- Scott-Keltie Island
- Stoliczka Island
- Tillo Island
- Torup Island
- Ugol'noy Kopi
- Wiener Neustadt Island
- Wilczek Island
- Wilczek Land
- Wilton Island
- Windward Island
- Zichy Land
- Ziegler Island

== Waterways ==
Markham Sound is a waterway between Zichy Land and the islands of McClintock and Hall. West of the British Channel is Prince George Land. Alexandra Land contains Weyprecht Bay. West of Austria Sound is Zichy Land. Immediately north of Franz Josef Land is the Queen Victoria Sea.

== Climate ==
Climatic conditions here are very severe with minimum temperatures as low as (-)25 °C to (-) 30 °C during winter; even in summers the temperature does not rise above 0 °C (32 °F). The polar nights lasts for 125 days while the polar days are 140. Climatically, the Gulf Streams does not reach the islands of Franz Josef Land. Polynias are formed by the wind and sea currents that prevail in the northern and southern part of the land mass, which are the causative factors for the large ice free zone in the sea. The eastern and northern winds cause very cold breezes. The precipitation varies between 100 millimetres (3.9 in) and 300 millimetres (12 in) but mostly in the form of snow.

== Geology ==
Two distinct geological formations identified are of the Late Triassic and Jurassic sedimentary process which are recorded to a depth of 200 metres (660 ft) at Cape Flora and recede gradually towards the coast line of the sea in the north. Fossilized tree trunks here attest to this assessment. Above the Jurassic sedimentary layer of 500 m (1,600 ft) thickness, which is basaltic, cretaceous period intrusions of dolerite caused by volcanic eruptions are recorded. Also seen are many fault zones which have contributed to the removal of volcanic layers and exposing plateau tops and rock walls. Another feature noted here is of the shore line which appears to have receded, as a result of island formations (the rise of the islands above the icy sea is reported to be 2–3 millimetres (0.079–0.118 in) per year). Though most of the land is covered by glacial ice, it does have outcrops covered with moss. The northeastern part of the archipelago is locked in pack ice most of the year; however the ice sometimes retreats north past the islands in summer (September).

== Links ==
- Franz Josef Land map, imagico.de
