= Brady Island =

Island in Franz Josef Land, Arkhangelsk Oblast, Russia

Остров Брейди
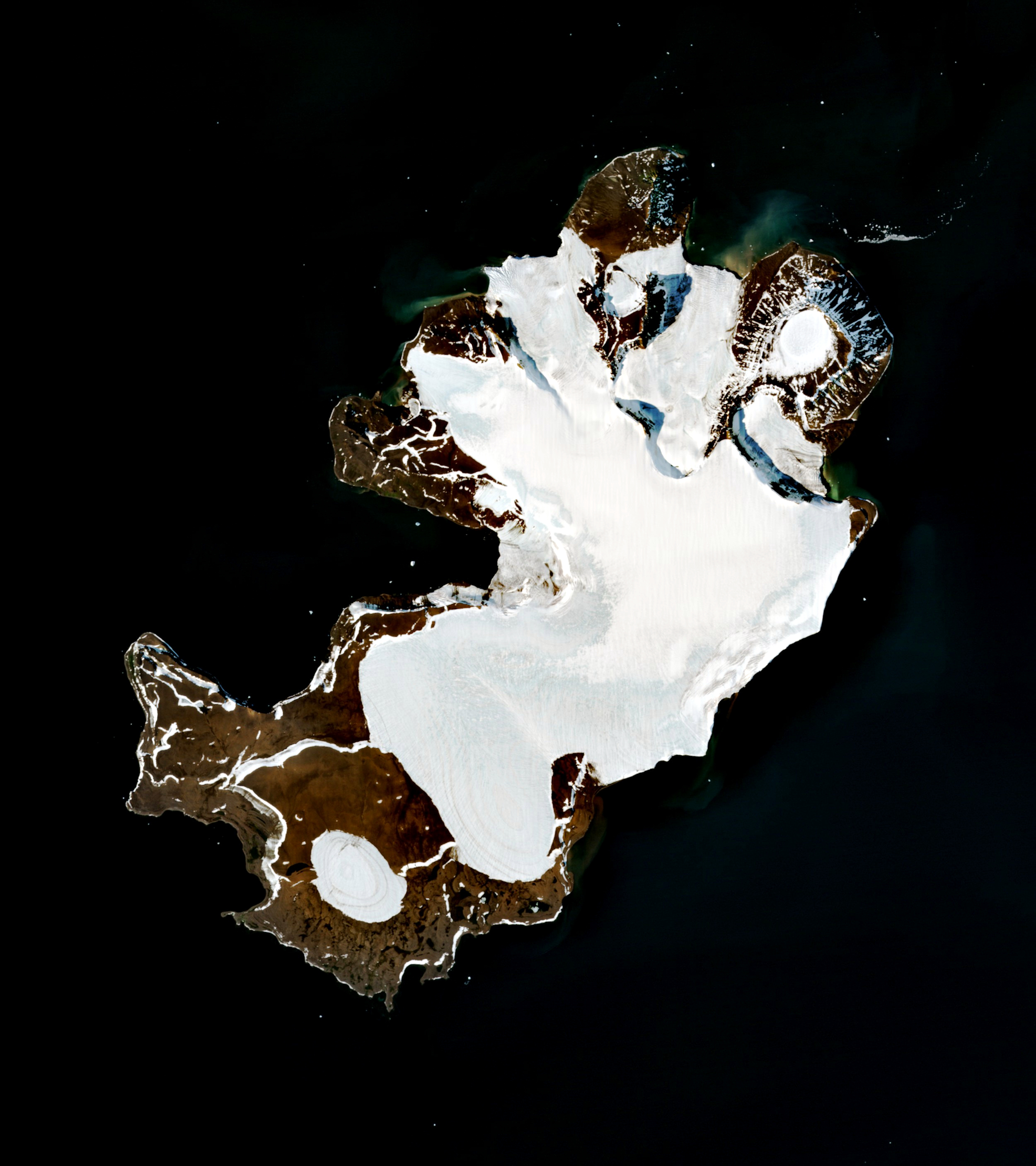
- Sentinel-2 image (2021)

- Location of Brady Island within southeastern Franz Josef Land

Geography
- Location: Arctic
- Coordinates: 80°16′02″N 55°17′17″E
- Archipelago: Franz Josef Archipelago
- Highest elevation: 381 m (1250 ft)

Administration
- Russia

Demographics
- Population: 0

Brady Island (Russian: Остров Брейди; Ostrov Bryeydi) is an island in Franz Josef Land, Arkhangelsk Oblast, Russia.

== Geography ==
The island has a maximum altitude of 381 m (1,250 ft). Between its northernmost point, Cape Wiese (Russian: мыс Визе), and its southernmost point, Cape Krasovsky (Russian: мыс Красовского), it is about 7 km (4 mi) in length. Located in the central part of the archipelago, it lies 8 km (5 mi) west of McClintock Island, separated by the Aberdare Strait (Russian: пролив Абердэр). Brice, Bliss, and Leigh-Smith Island are located to the north and west of Brady Island, beyond the Sidorov Strait (Russian: пролив Сидорова).

== History ==
The island was discovered by Benjamin Leigh Smith in 1880. It is most likely named after Henry Bowman Brady, a zoologist who examined collections from both the Austro-Hungarian North Pole expedition and Albert Hastings Markham’s expedition in 1879. The expedition also gave the name Cape Speelman to what is now Cape Krasovsky, after Jhr. M. H. Speelman (1852–1907), a lieutenant on the Dutch Arctic expeditions 1878–1879. The current name was given in 1950, in honour of Russian scientist Feodosy Krasovsky.

== See also ==
- Franz Josef Land
- List of islands of Russia
