= Miocyprideis timorensis =

Miocyprideis timorensis Temporal range: Miocene–Recent

Scientific classification
- Kingdom: Animalia
- Phylum: Arthropoda
- Clade: Pancrustacea
- Class: Ostracoda
- Order: Podocopida
- Family: Cytherideidae
- Genus: Miocyprideis
- Species: M. timorensis

Binomial name
- Miocyprideis timorensis (Fyan, 1916)

Synonyms
- Bishopina timorensis (Fyan, 1916); Cytheridea timorensis Fyan, 1916; Neocyprideis timorensis (Fyan, 1916)

Species of seed shrimp

Miocyprideis timorensis is a species of Indo-Pacific ostracod that has existed since the Miocene.

== Distribution ==
Miocyprideis timorensis has been found in the waters of the Red Sea, Singapore and the western Malay Peninsula. It has also been found as a fossil in Upper Pliocene rocks from Timor and Miocene to Quaternary rocks in the Solomon Islands.

== Taxonomic history ==
It was first discovered by George Stewardson Brady in 1880, but remained undescribed until E. C. Fyan formally described it in 1916.
