= Ziegler Island =

Island in Franz Josef Land, Russia

Russian: Остров Циглера
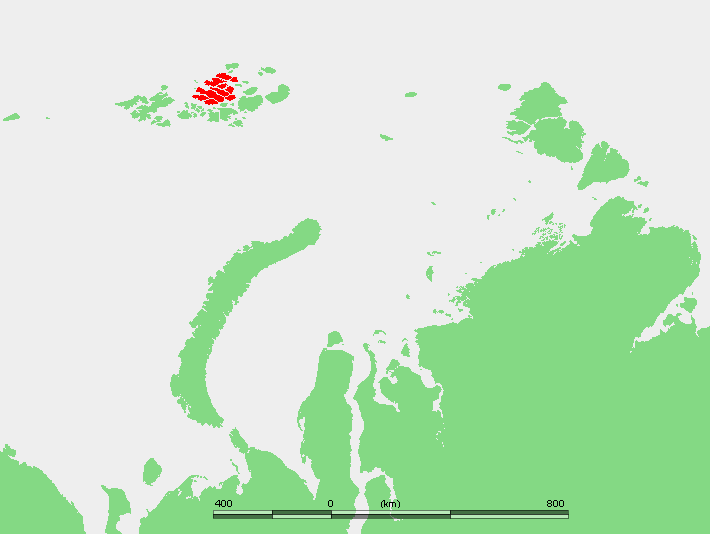
- Location of the Zemlya Zichy subgroup of the Franz Josef Archipelago. Ziegler Island lies roughly in its center.

Geography
- Location: Arctic
- Coordinates: 81°06′N 56°11′E (?)
- Archipelago: Zichy Land in Franz Josef Land
- Area: 448 km^{2} (173 sq mi)
- Highest elevation: 554 m (1818 ft)

Administration
- Russia

Demographics
- Population: 0

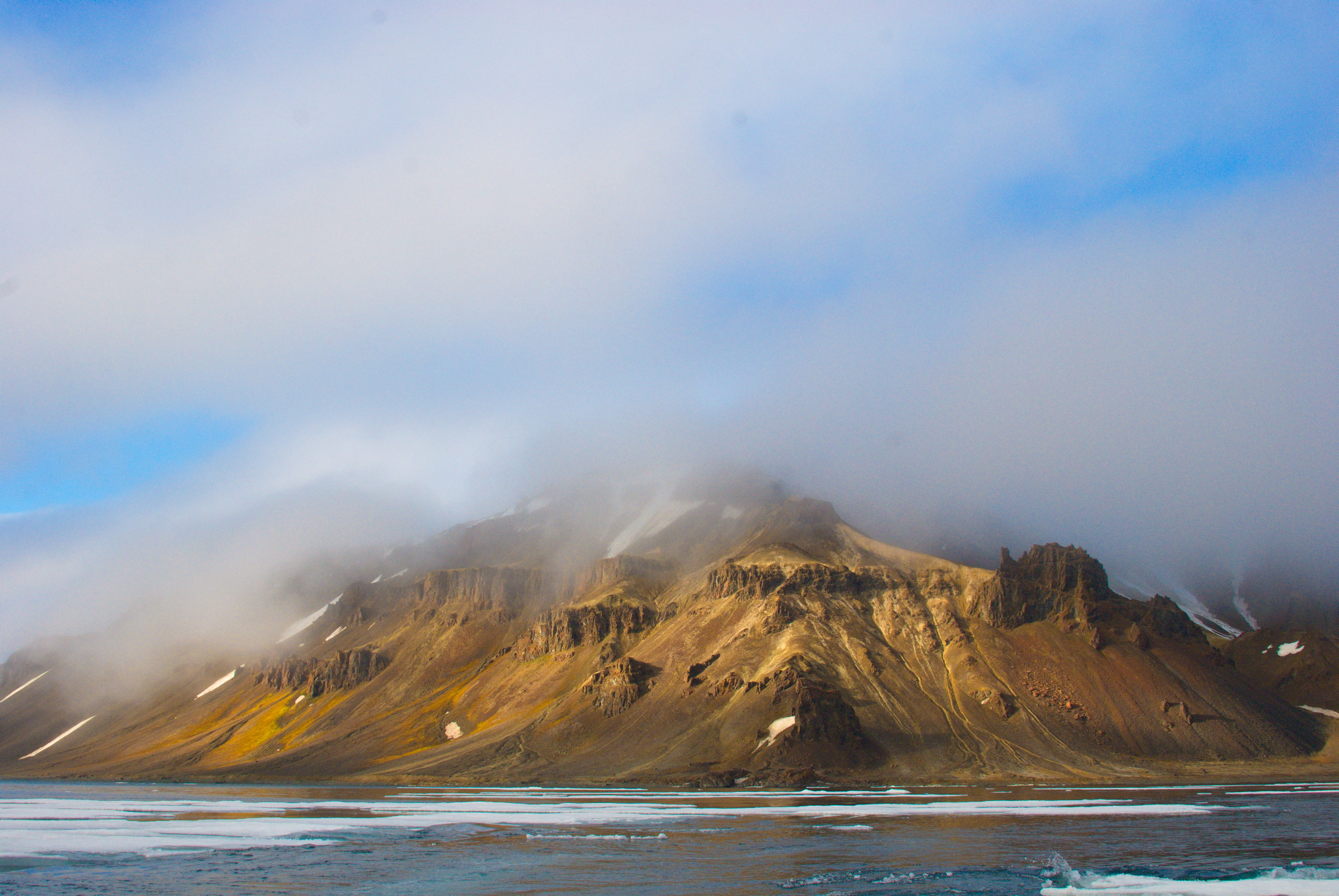
Cape Brice, Ziegler Island, Franz Josef Land

Ziegler Island (Russian: Остров Циглера; Ostrov Tsiglera) is an island in Franz Josef Land, Russia.

== Geography ==
This island is 45 kilometres (28 miles) long, stretching from the NW to the SE. Its area is 448 square kilometres (173 square miles) and it is almost completely unglacierized. The highest point on Ziegler Island is 554 metres (1,818 feet). Cape Brice (мыс Брайса) marks the northwestern corner. Cape Washington (мыс Вашингтона) lies in the very east. The southernmost point is called Cape Belousov (мыс Белоусова).

=== Adjacent islands ===
Ziegler Island is part of the Zichy Land subgroup of the Franz Josef Archipelago. Booth Channel (пролив Бута) separates it from Payer Island and Greely Island to the north. Salisbury Island lies across Rhodes Channel (пролив Родса) to the south. To the east, beyond Collinson Channel (пролив Коллинсона), is Wiener Neustadt Island.

Ostrov Ugol'noy Kopi (остров Угольной Копи) or Coal Mine Island is a round island wedged between Ziegler Island and Greely Island at 80.9644°N 58.0461°E. It is about 3.5 kilometres (2.2 miles) in diameter. The highest point of the unglacierized island is 393 m (1,289 ft). Ugol'noy Kopi is separated from Ziegler Island by about 600 metres (660 yards).

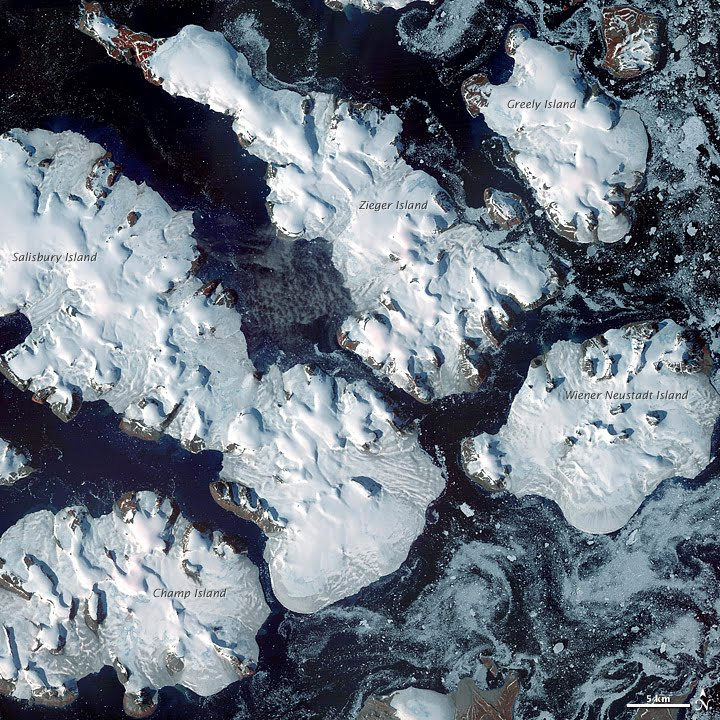
Various islands of Franz Josef Land

== History ==
The southeast of Ziegler Island was sighted by the Austro-Hungarian North Pole expedition in 1874. Co-expedition leader Julius Payer presumed that it was connected to the other islands of Zichy Land.

The exploration done by the 1894–1897 Jackson-Harmsworth expedition reduced the supposed landmass of Zichy Land appearing on the maps considerably. Jackson sighted Ziegler Island from the northwest and named Cape Brice after Arthur Montefiore Brice, the expedition's secretary.

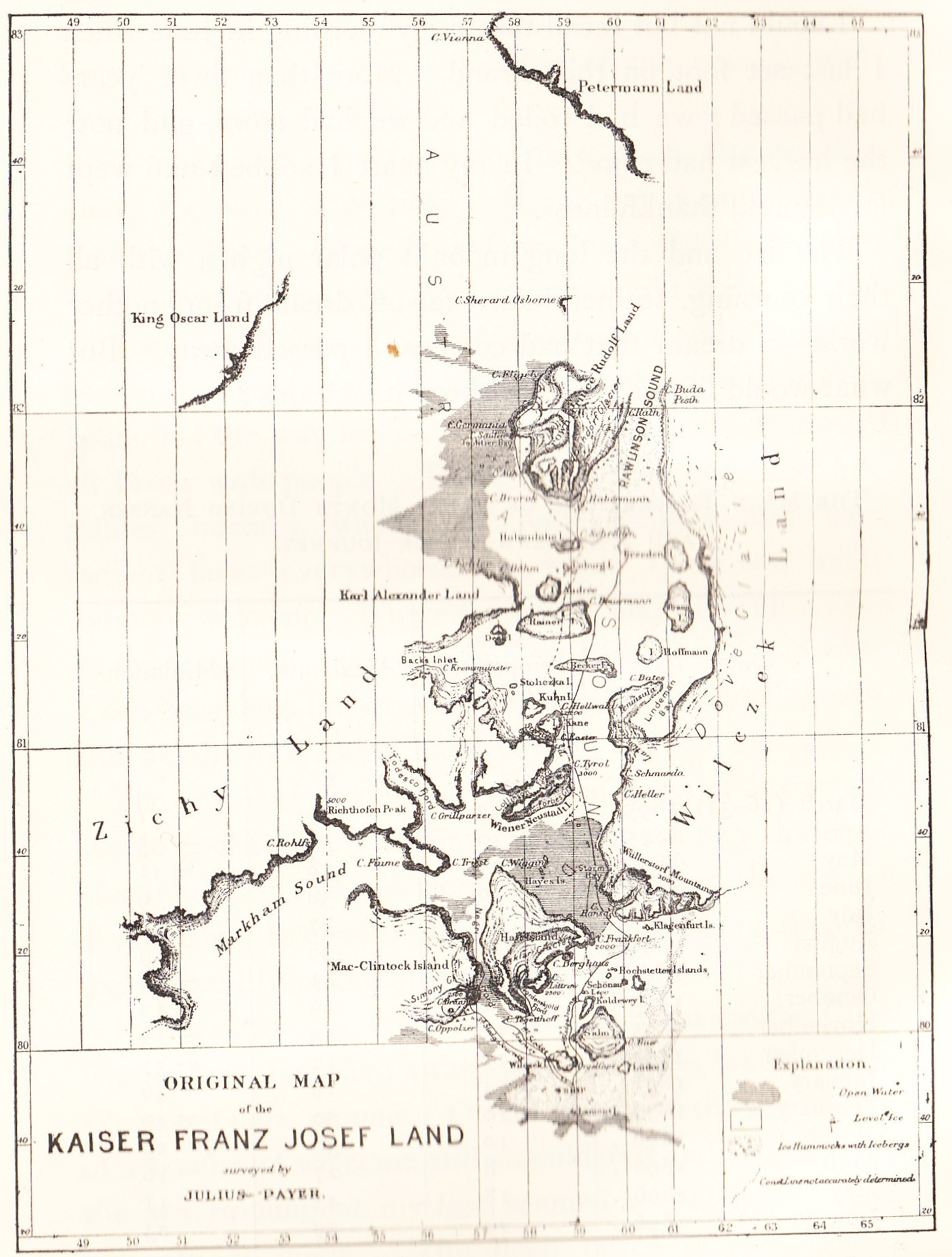
Zichy Land in an 1874 Franz Josef Land map by Julius Payer.

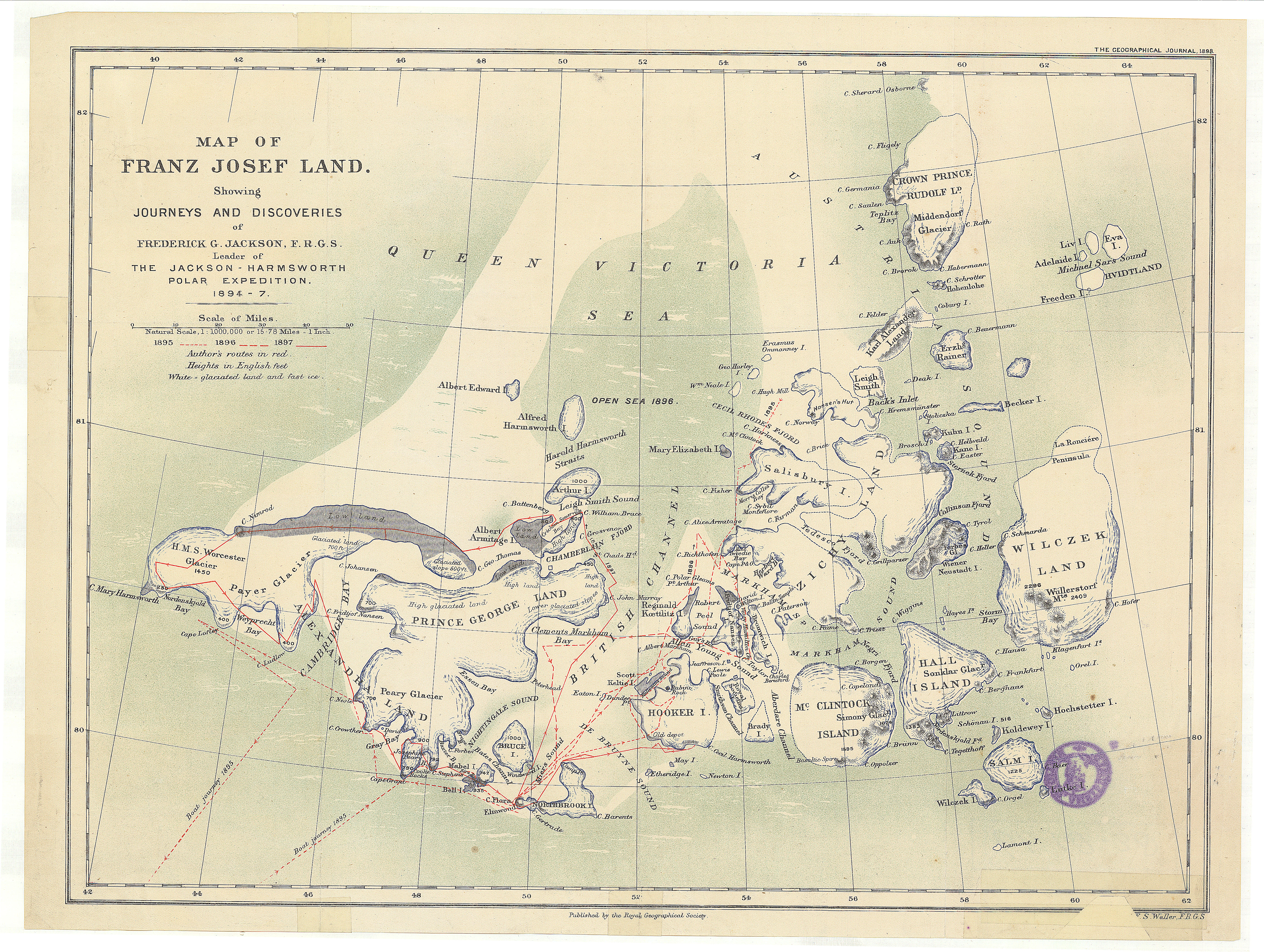
Zichy Land in an 1898 map of Frederick Jackson's explorations showing some separate islands already.

The 1901–1902 Baldwin-Ziegler Polar Expedition on ships America, Frithjof, and Belgica named Cape Washington and were the first to set foot on the island. In May 1902 Evelyn Briggs Baldwin ascertained that Ziegler Island was a distinct entity. He named the island after the expedition sponsor, New York businessman William Ziegler. Ziegler was also the sponsor behind the 1903–1905 Ziegler-Fiala Polar Expedition that improved upon Baldwin's map.

The Austrian observing site Payer–Weyprecht (probably 81°06′N 56°11′E) was established around the start of the 20th century on this island.

== See also ==
- List of islands of Russia
- William Barr, The First Cruise into the Soviet Arctic.
