= Champ Island =

Island in Franz Josef Land, Russia

Russian: Остров Чамп
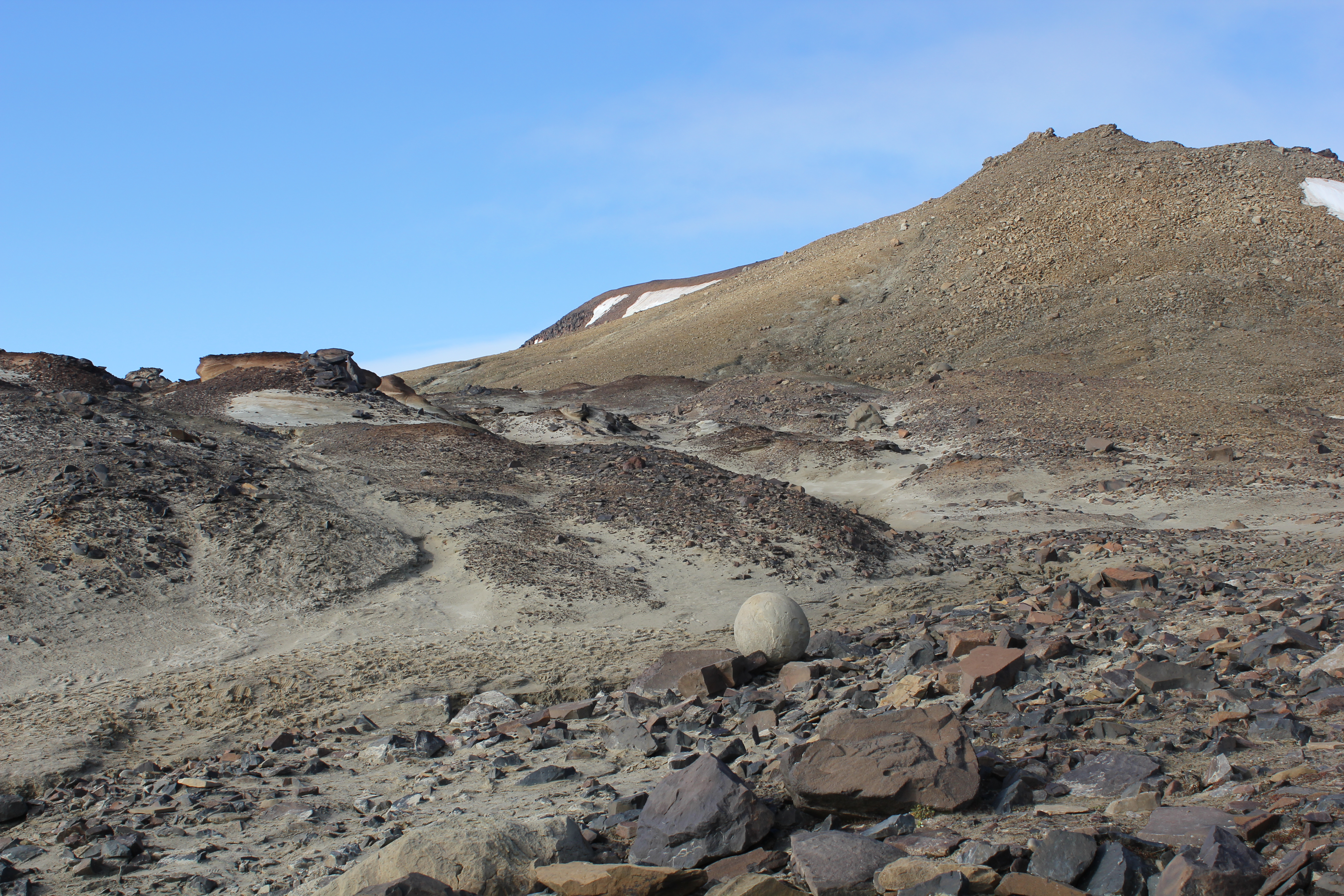
- Landscape of the island with a concretion.

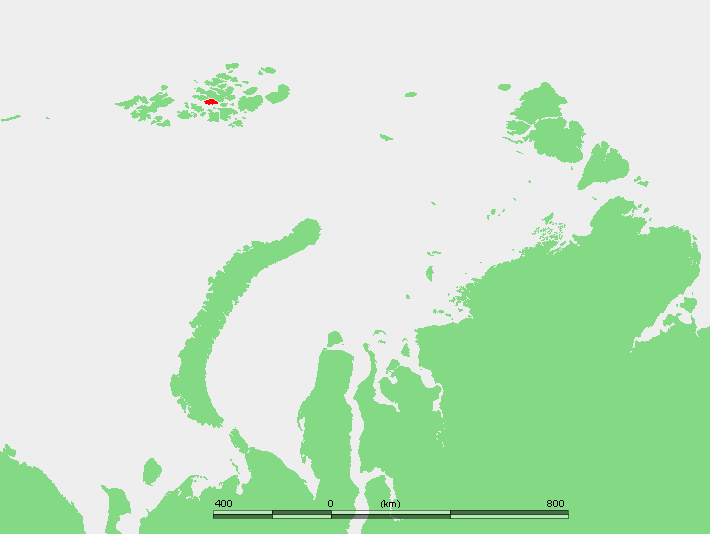
- Location of Champ Island in the Franz Josef Archipelago

Geography
- Location: Arctic
- Coordinates: 80.6739°N 56.2369°E
- Archipelago: Zichy Land; Franz Josef Archipelago
- Area: 374 km^{2} (144 sq mi)
- Highest elevation: 507 m (1663 ft)

Administration
- Russia

Demographics
- Population: 0

Champ Island (Russian: Остров Чамп; Ostrov Champ) is the southernmost island of the Zichy group of islands, administratively located in the Primorsky district of Franz Josef Land, Russia. The highest point of the island is 507 meters above sea level. The area is 374 km².

== History ==
This island was named after William S. Champ, who was the representative of the late William Ziegler and leader of the relief operation searching for Anthony Fiala of the Fiala-Ziegler Polar Expedition.

A piece of a century-year-old ski was found in Champ Island, at Cape Trieste (Mys Triest) in August 2006.

== Geography ==
Champ Island has a surface of 374 km^{2} (144 sq mi) and a shoreline of 90.6 km (297,244 ft). There is a wide unglacierized zone in the southwest of the island. The highest point of the island is 507 m (1,663 ft).

Champ Island is the southernmost island of the Zichy Land subgroup of the Franz Joseph Archipelago. It is separated by narrow sounds from Luigi Island in the north and Salisbury Island in the northeast.

The broad channel in the west of Champ Island is known as Markham Sound (Пролив маркама; Proliv Markama), after British polar explorer Admiral Sir Albert Hastings Markham.

The island is known by its concretions, stone spheres with dimensions from millimetres to several meters.

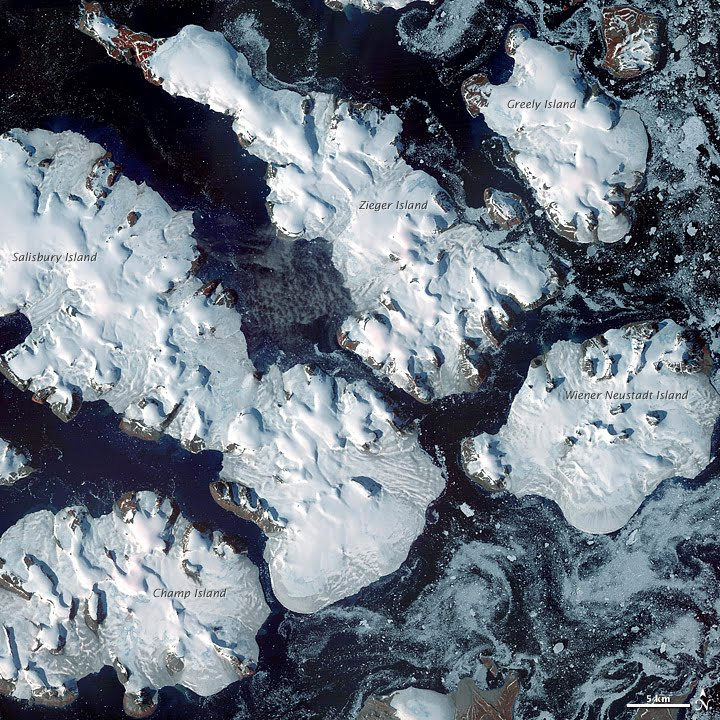
Various islands of central Franz Josef Land - NASA Earth Observatory

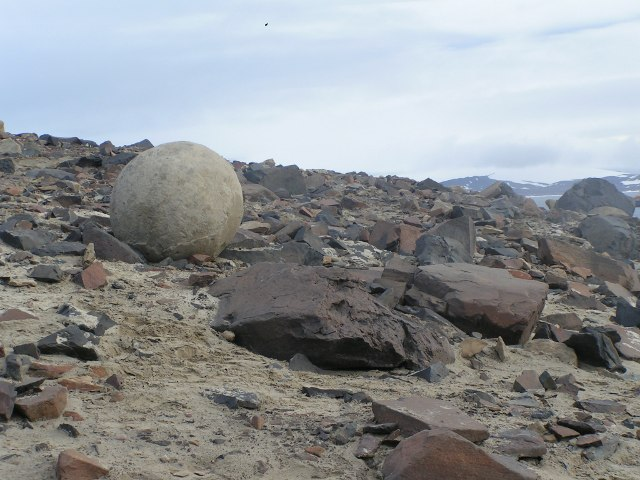
Stone sphere in Champ Island

== See also ==
- List of islands of Russia
