= George Stewardson Brady =

British copepodologist

- Born: 18 April 1832
- Died: 25 December 1921 (aged 89)

George Stewardson Brady (18 April 1832 – 25 December 1921) was an English zoologist who was professor of natural history at the Hancock Museum in Newcastle-upon-Tyne who did important volumes on Copepoda and Ostracoda, including those from the Challenger expedition.

== Family and upbringing ==
He was the eldest son of Henry Brady, surgeon of Gateshead, and his wife Hannah (née Bowman) of Derbyshire. He married Ellen Wright in 1859.

He and his younger brother Henry Bowman Brady were both educated at the Friends' School, Ackworth and at Bootham school, York, where they were schoolfellows of the botanist John Gilbert Baker, and the Rowntree brothers Joseph, John, and Henry, of the famous cocoa business which bore their name.

== Career ==
Brady went to the University of Durham College of Medicine. He was awarded LSA and MD (1876) by St Andrews. He practised medicine in Gateshead (1857–1906) and was Professor of Natural History, Armstrong College, Newcastle (1875–1906).

He wrote reports on the Ostracoda and Copepoda of the Challenger expedition. He was elected Fellow of the Royal Society in June 1882.

== Publications ==
- the 3-volume "A Monograph of the Free and Semi-parasitic Copepoda of the British Isles" for the Ray Society in 1880, but also publishing on the Challenger copepods and collections from different national expeditions; cooperator of Norman (q.v.);
- worked mainly on "entomostracans" and had many species named after him [Bradya Boeck, 1872, Bradyidius Giesbrecht, 1897, Bradycalanus A. Scott, 1909, Bradyetes Farran, 1905, Bradycinetus Sars, 1866, Bradycypris G.O. Sars, 1924, Bradypontius Giesbrecht, 1895, Bathycalanus bradyi (Wolfenden, 1905), Undinopsis bradyi G.O. Sars, 1884, Pareuchaeta bradyi (With, 1915), Scolecithrix bradyi Giesbrecht, 1888, Centropages bradyi Wheeler, 1899, Cervinia bradyi Brady, 1878 ex Norman MS, Peltobradya Médioni & Soyer, 1967, Neobradya T. Scott, 1892, Antarcticobradya Huys, 1987, Phyllopodopsyllus bradyi (T. Scott, 1892), Sarsicytheridea bradii (Norman, 1865), Bythocythere bradyi G.O. Sars, 1926, Sclerochilus bradyi Rudjakov, 1962, Paradoxostoma bradyi G.O. Sars, 1928, Diastylis bradyi Norman, 1879, Ilyocypris bradyi G.O. Sars, 1890, Coronida bradyi (A. Milne-Edwards, 1869), Bradyidius bradyi (G.O. Sars, 1884), Cycloleberis bradyi ].
- "The voyage of HMS Challenger", report on the ostracoda dredged by HMS Challenger during the years 1873-1876
