= La Ronciere Island =

Island in Franz Josef Land, Russia

La Ronciere Island Whitney Island
Russian: Остров Ла-Ронсьер
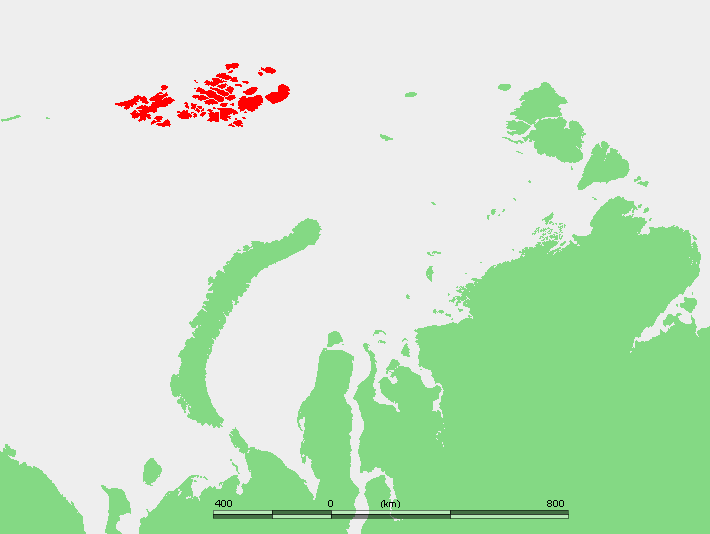
- Location of the Franz Josef Archipelago

Geography
- Location: Arctic
- Coordinates: 80.9822°N 60.9942°E
- Archipelago: Franz Josef Archipelago
- Area: 478 km^{2} (185 sq mi)
- Highest elevation: 431 m (1414 ft)

Administration
- Russia

Demographics
- Population: 0

La Ronciere Island (Russian: Остров Ла-Ронсьер, romanized: Ostrov La-Ronsier, also known as Ronser Island, is an island in Franz Josef Land, Russia.

== History ==
This island was named by the Austro-Hungarian North Pole Expedition after Captain La Ronciere Le Noury, a French courier for Austro-Hungarian Emperor Franz Joseph.

On some maps La Ronciere Island appears as "Whitney Island", after American Arctic financier William Collins Whitney. This name was given by the American explorer Evelyn Briggs Baldwin, but the Austro-Hungarian explorers who discovered Franz Josef land had named this island first.

== Geography ==
La Ronciere Island's area is 478 km^{2} (185 sq mi). Its latitude is 81° N and its longitude 61° E. The highest point of the island is 431 m (1,414 ft). It is almost completely glaciarized except for two small points by the shore in the northeast and in the west.

La Ronciere Island lies north of Wilczek Land, separated from it by an 8 km (5 mi) wide sound.

=== Adjacent islands ===
==== Geddes Island ====
6 km (3.7 mi) southwest of La Ronciere Island and 4 km (2.5 mi) north of Wilczek Land's northwestern cape, at 80.8716667°N 60.1172222°E, lies a small island called Ostrov Geidzh (Остров Гейдж) or Geddes Island. This barely 1-kilometre-long (0.6 mi) island was named after Scottish polar scientist Sir Patrick Geddes.

This same island was named Hayden Island (Остров Гайдана; Ostrov Gaydana), after pioneering American geologist Ferdinand Vandeveer Hayden, by the Ziegler-Fiala expedition.

== See also ==
- List of islands of Russia
