= Jackson Island =

Island in Russia

Остров Джексона
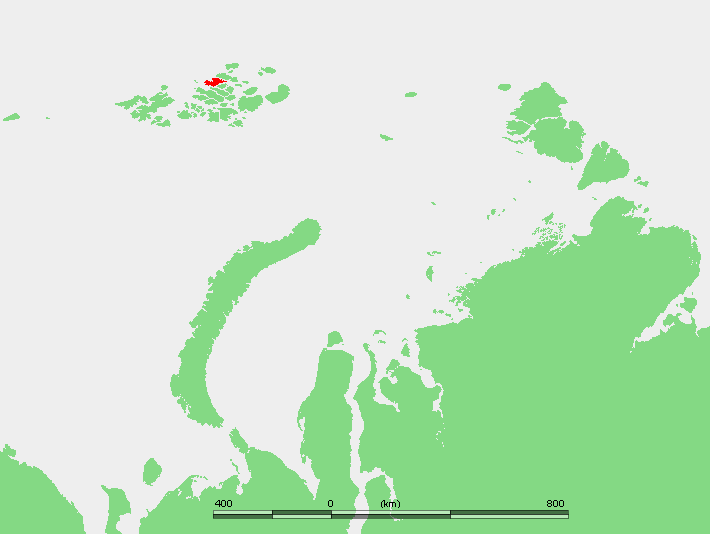
- Location of Jackson Island in the Franz Josef Archipelago.

- Location within Russia

Geography
- Coordinates: title 81.2297222°N 56.6288889°E
- Archipelago: Franz Josef Land
- Area: 510 km^{2} (200 sq mi)
- Length: 40 km (25 mi)
- Width: 30 km (19 mi)
- Highest elevation: 481 m (1578 ft)

Administration
- Arkhangelsk Oblast, Russia

Demographics
- Population: 0

Jackson Island (Russian: Остров Джексона, Ostrov Dzheksona) is an island located in Franz Josef Land, Arkhangelsk Oblast, Russian Federation. This island is part of the Zichy Land subgroup of the central part of the archipelago.

== Geography ==
Jackson Island's east–west extension is about 40 km (25 mi), and the maximum distance from north to south is 30 km (19 mi).

On the northwest shore of the island is De Long Bay. Named after ill-fated American Arctic explorer George W. De Long, this bay separates the island into two almost even peninsulas. From the south, this bay is bounded by Cape Bystrova, named in 1963 in honor of outstanding Russian paleontologist A.P. Bystrow.

Jackson Island is named in honor of English polar voyager Frederick Jackson. He explored and named several islands, among other geographical features, in Franz Josef Land. The Jackson-Harmsworth Arctic Expedition (1894–1897) was sponsored by the Royal Geographical Society.

== History ==
Cape Norway (81°12′N 55°37′E) on the western part of the island was where Fridtjof Nansen and Hjalmar Johansen wintered in 1895-96 after failing to reach the North Pole. A hut and a wooden post still remain.

== Adjacent islands ==
- Alexander Islands (Острова Александра) is a group of small islands located right off the northwestern tip of Jackson Island, close to the shore. Sputnik Island is located at lat 81° 21' N; long 55° 35' E. This island group might have been named after Field Marshal Alexander von Krobatin (1849–1933), a supporter of the Austro-Hungarian North Pole Expedition, who served as Austria-Hungary's Minister of War from 1912 to 1917. However the connection to the Austro-Hungarian expedition is dubious, as these islands were only discovered by Nansen in 1895. The maps of the Austro-Hungarian expedition make it clear that they could not see far into Back's Strait, leaving the Alexander Islands out of their view. It is also possible that Nansen named this island after his brother, Alexander Nansen, considering he named other islands for his wife, daughter, mother, and friend, respectively. These small islands should not be confused with Alexandra Land located westwards in the same archipelago.
- Ommanney Island (Остров Оммани) is a small crescent-shaped island located 11 km (6.8 mi) off the northwestern tip of Jackson Island. This island was named after Arctic veteran Sir Erasmus Ommanney, who went in 1850 on the Austin and Ommaney Expedition, searching for Sir John Franklin.
- Harley Island (Остров Харли) is a 10 km (6.2 mi) long and narrow island. It lies 15 km (9.3 mi) off Jackson Island's western shores. Highest point 82 m (269 ft). This island is named after Scottish physician George Harley (1829–96).
- Levanevsky Island (Остров Леваневского) is a small island just 1 km (0.62 mi) south of Harley Island's southern tip. This island was named in honor of Soviet pilot Sigismund Levanevsky, sometimes called the "Russian Lindbergh", who was lost in the Arctic in 1937-38 and whose remains have not been found.
- Kling Island (Остров Клинг) is a small island lying 4 km (2.5 mi) to the west of Jackson Island's southwestern tip. This island was named after Captain Alfred Kling who took part in the Wilhelm Filchner 1911-1912 German expedition to the Antarctic.
- Nich Island (Остров Нич) is a small island located in the De Long Bay.
- Off Jackson Island's eastern shore lie two small islands called Magee Islands (Острова Макги). These were named after Billy Magee who accompanied Ernest Oberholtzer in his epic 1912 3,000-mile (4,800 km) Arctic exploration trip.
- Querini Island (Остров Кверини) is an island located by the shore in the bay that lies on Jackson Island's southern coast. This island is named after Italian explorer Francesco Querini who heroically lost his life in the Cegni polar expedition of 1909.

== See also ==
- Alexander Island (disambiguation)
- List of islands of Russia
