= Austrian Strait =

Strait in Arkhangelsk Oblast, Russia

Coordinates: 80.7°N 59°E

Austrian Strait (Russian: Австрийский пролив) is a strait in the eastern part of the Franz Josef Land archipelago in Arkhangelsk Oblast, Russia. It was first reported and named in 1874 by the Austro-Hungarian North Pole Expedition.

The Austrian Strait separates the easternmost island group from the rest of the Franz Josef Land archipelago. From the north the strait starts at the Beryozkina Channel, first south and then southeast along the shores of Wilczek Land, separating this from Wiener Neustadt Island to the west and Hall Island to the southwest. To the southeast the strait ends in the northeastern Barents Sea.

== Sources ==
- Топографическая карта U-37,38,39,40 - 1 : 1 000 000
