= Markham Sound =

Strait in Franz Josef Land, Russia

Coordinates: 80.6°N 55°E

Franz Josef Land

Markham Sound (Russian: пролив Маркама) is a strait in the eastern part of the Franz Josef Land archipelago in Arkhangelsk Oblast, Russia. It was first reported and named in 1874 by the Austro-Hungarian North Pole Expedition. The name commemorates the British Royal Navy officer Albert Hastings Markham (1841–1918).

The Markham Sound separates the northern section of the central island group of the Franz Josef Land archipelago from the southern section of the same island group. From the west the strait starts at the British Channel, runs in a southeasterly direction and ends in the Austrian Strait.

== Sources ==
- Топографическая карта U-37,38,39,40 - 1 : 1 000 000
