= British Channel =

Strait in Arctic Russia

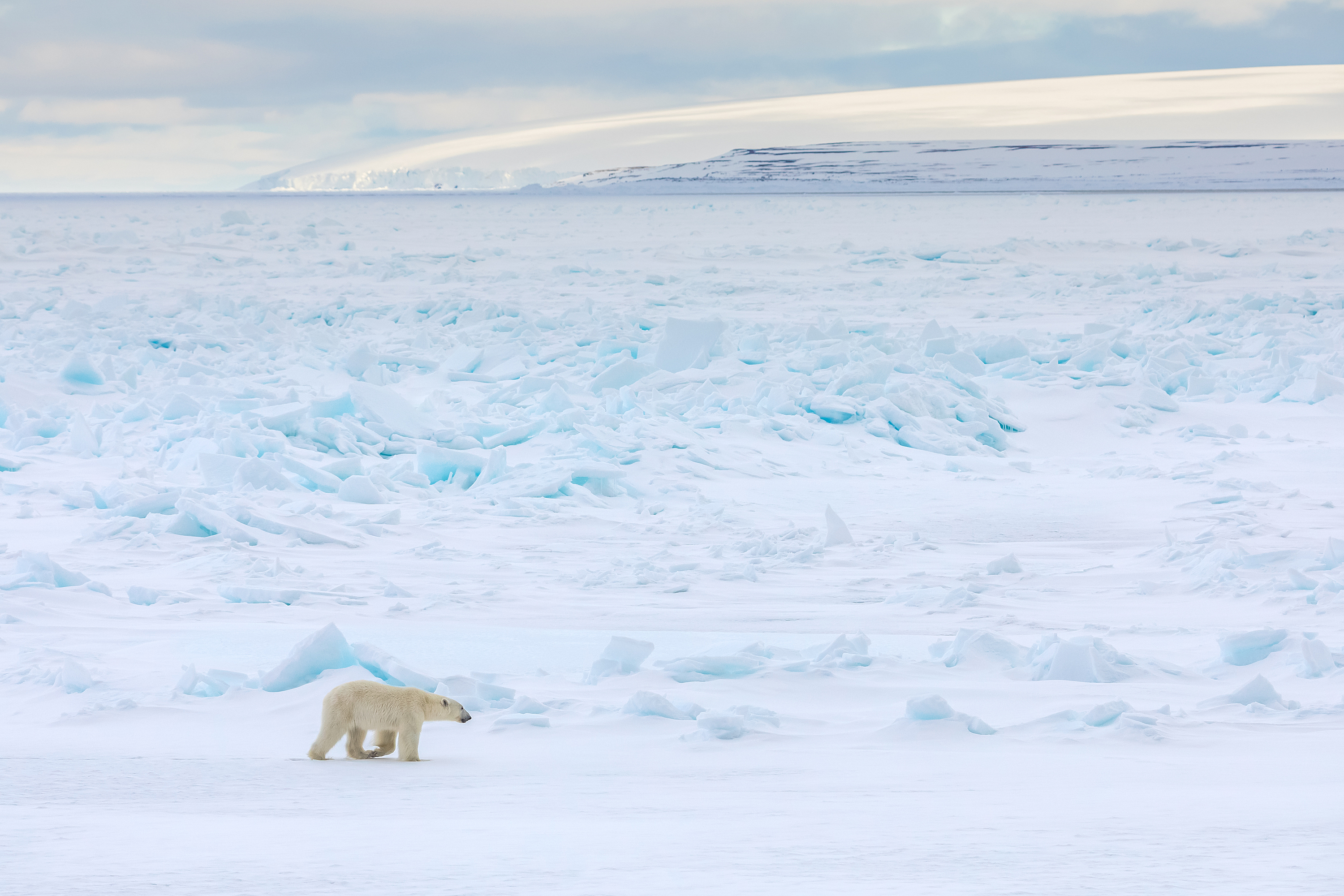
- British Channel

- Location in Russia
- Coordinates: 80°24′N 50°55′E
- Average depth: 522 m (1,713 ft)

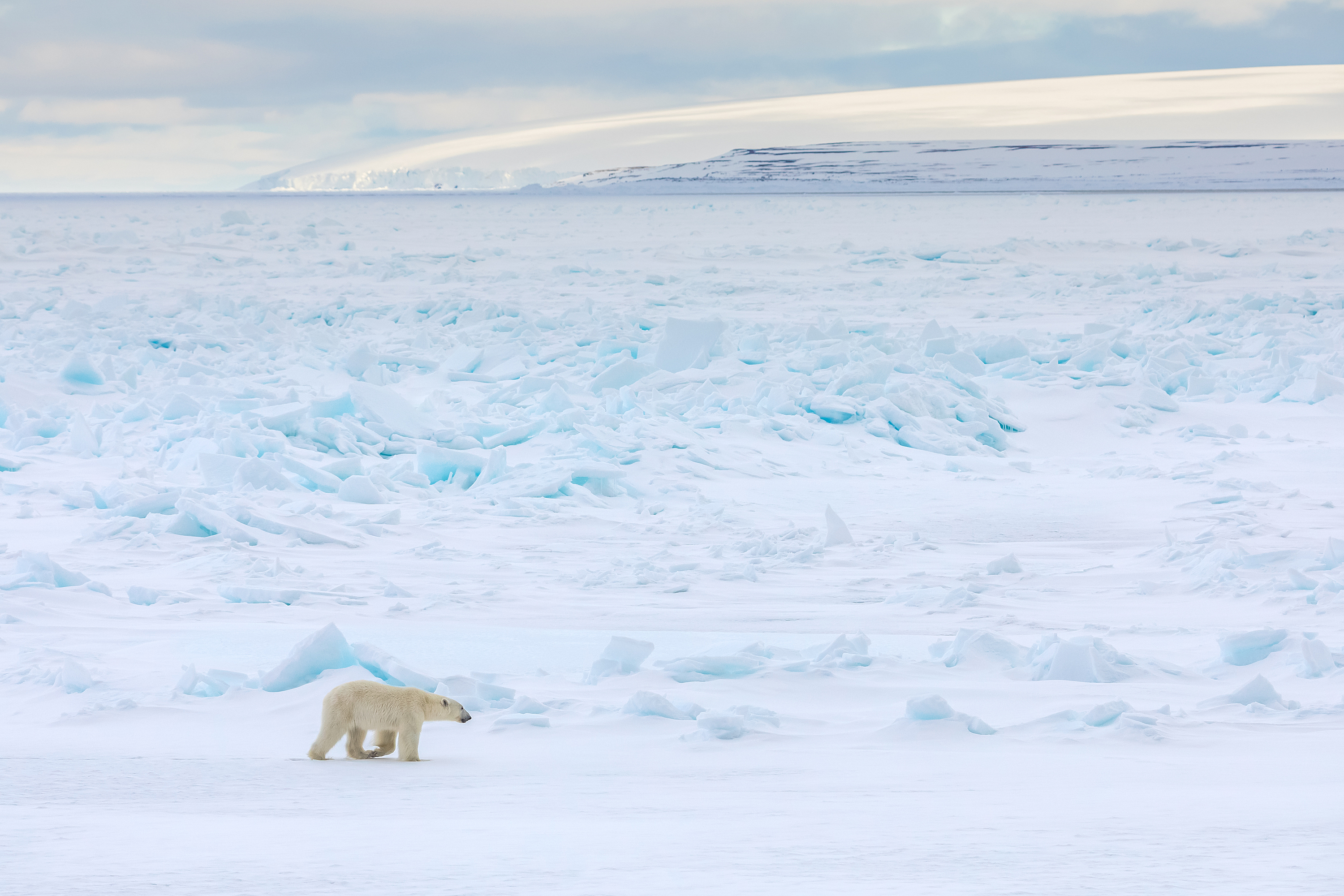
British Channel

British Channel (Russian: Британский канал) is a strait in the western part of the Franz Josef Land archipelago in Arkhangelsk Oblast, Russia. It was first reported and named in 1875 by the Jackson–Harmsworth expedition.

The British Channel separates the westernmost island group from the rest of the Franz Josef Land archipelago. To the north the strait starts at the Queen Victoria Sea, in an southwesterly direction. It separates Prince Georg Land to the west from the smaller Koetlitz Island and Hooker Island to the east. About two-thirds down Prince Georg Land, the channel is split in two where the Nightingale Sound continues down the coast of Prince Georg Land and the De Bruyne Sound diverts to the southeast.

== Sources ==
- Топографическая карта U-37,38,39,40 - 1 : 1 000 000
