= Polar Record =

- Discipline: Polar regions
- Language: English
- Edited by: Dr Nikolas Sellheim, Dr Trevor McIntyre

Publication details
- Former name(s): The Polar Record
- History: 1931–present
- Publisher: Cambridge University Press on behalf of the Scott Polar Research Institute
- Frequency: Quarterly
- Impact factor: 0.84 (2019)

Standard abbreviations
- ISO 4: Polar Rec.

Indexing
- CODEN: POLRAV
- ISSN: 0032-2474 (print); 1475-3057 (web)
- LCCN: 35024615
- OCLC no.: 52079372

Links
- Journal homepage; Online access; Online archive

Polar Record is a quarterly peer-reviewed academic journal covering all aspects of Arctic and Antarctic exploration and research. It is managed by the Scott Polar Research Institute and published by Cambridge University Press. The journal was established in 1931 and the Co-editors-in-chief are Dr Nikolas Sellheim (University of Helsinki) and Dr Trevor McIntyre (University of South Africa).

== Abstracting and indexing ==
The journal is abstracted and indexed in:

- ProQuest databases
- Science Citation Index Expanded
- Current Contents/Agriculture, Biology & Environmental Sciences
- The Zoological Record
- BIOSIS Previews
- EBSCOhost
- CABI
- Scopus

The journal had a 2019 impact factor of 0.84.

== History ==
Volume 1, first published in 1931

The journal was established in 1931, by The Scott Polar Research Institute which itself was founded in 1926. The foreword of the first issue in the first volume stated that the journal was created to address the challenge of "so much exploration and exploitation in the polar regions, the news of which appear in so many forms and languages", and that "in the first place an attempt will be made merely to record the chief polar events of the preceding six months; but it is hoped that the scope of the journal will gradually be expanded. The main body of The Polar Record, therefore, is a resume of polar news extracted from the best available sources.." The Committee of Management decided that the director of the Scott Polar Research Institute also be the editor. Therefore, the at-the-time director of the institute, Frank Debenham became the founding editor of the journal.

From its inception in 1931 to 1953, each volume was triennial, with issues published every six months. Between years 1954 and 1987 the volumes became biennial, with three issues published every year starting in 1955. In 1988 each volume became annual, with quarterly publication of issues.
