= McClintock Island =

Island in Franz Josef Land, Russia

Russian: Остров Мак-Клинтока
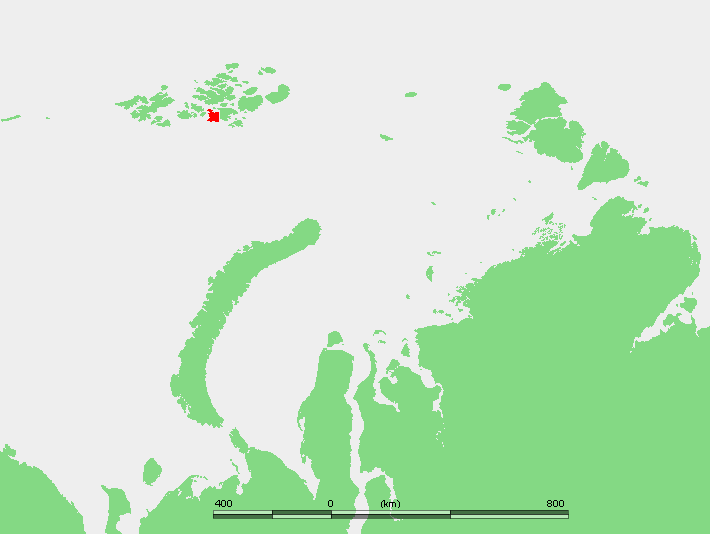
- Location of McClintock Island in the Franz Josef Archipelago

Geography
- Location: Russian Arctic
- Coordinates: 80.1575°N 56.485556°E
- Archipelago: Franz Josef Archipelago
- Area: 612 km^{2} (236 sq mi)
- Length: 33 km (20.5 mi)
- Highest elevation: 521 m (1709 ft)

Administration
- Russia

Demographics
- Population: 0

McClintock Island (Russian: Остров Мак-Клинтока; Ostrov Mak-Klintoka) is an island in Franz Josef Land, Russia.

== History ==
The island was discovered by the Austro-Hungarian North Pole expedition in March 1874, and they named it after Irish explorer of the Arctic Francis Leopold McClintock. Karl Weyprecht and Julius von Payer's third expedition to Franz Josef Land in April 1874, was to explore McClintock Island, but they had to abandon their ship Tegetthoff and were rescued by a Russian ship that took to them Vardø. Payer climbed Cape Brünn from which he attempted to survey the southern coast of Zichy Land and estimated the westward extent of Franz Josef Land to reach 50° E at least.

The Baldwin-Ziegler Polar Expedition were the next to set foot on the island on 1 September 1901, at Cape Dillon. This was also the spot where the first members of the stranded Ziegler Polar Expedition were found by Johan Kjeldsen aboard the Terra Nova on 30 July 1905.

The Bratvaag Expedition led by Gunnar Horn passed by the island in 1930.

Bowhead whales were detected near other islands in Franz Josef Land, but not near McClintock Island.

== Geography ==
The island's northernmost point is called Cape Greely (мыс Грили). The northerwestern point is Cape Karpinsky (мыс Карпинского), the southwestern point is Cape Dillon (мыс Диллона). From north to south, Cape Bergen (мыс Берген), Cape Brünn (мыс Брюнн), and Cape Oppolzer (мыс Оппольцера) are located on the eastern shore. Another small group of islands, Ostrova Lyuriki, lie slightly further to the west.

== See also ==
- List of islands of Russia

== Works cited ==
=== Books ===
- Corwin, Edward (1907). The History of Nations: Norway, Sweden, and Denmark. Vol. 16. Collier's.

=== Journals ===
- "Norges Svalbard-og Ishavs-undersøkelser Expedition to East Svalbard and Franz Josef Land, 1930". Polar Record. 1 (2). Cambridge University Press: 41. 1931. doi:10.1017/S003224740002920X.
- de Korte, J.; Belikov, S. (1994). "Observations of Greenland whales (Balaena mysticetus), Zemlya Frantsa-Iosifa". Polar Record. 30 (173). Cambridge University Press: 135–136. doi:10.2307/40511850. JSTOR 40511850.
- Gjertz, Ian; Mørkved, Berit (1998). "Norwegian Arctic Expansionism, Victoria Island (Russia) and the Bratvaag Expedition". Artic. 51 (4). Arctic Institute of North America: 330–335. doi:10.2307/40511850. JSTOR 40511850.
