= Henry Bowman Brady =

British micropalaeontologist

Henry Bowman Brady (23 February 1835 Gateshead, England – 10 January 1891 Bournemouth) was a British micropalaeontologist.

== Life ==
He was the second son of Henry Brady, Surgeon of Gateshead, and his wife Hannah Bowman of Derbyshire.

Henry and his older brother George Stewardson Brady were both educated at the Friends' School, Ackworth and at Bootham school, York, where they were schoolfellows of the botanist John Gilbert Baker, and the Rowntree brothers Joseph, John, and Henry, of the famous cocoa business which bore their name.

Brady became a fellow of the Linnean Society on 17 March 1859, but resigned in 1887; he was also a fellow of the Geological Society from 1864, of the Royal Society from 1874, serving on its council in 1888, and of the Zoological Society from 1888.

== Works ==
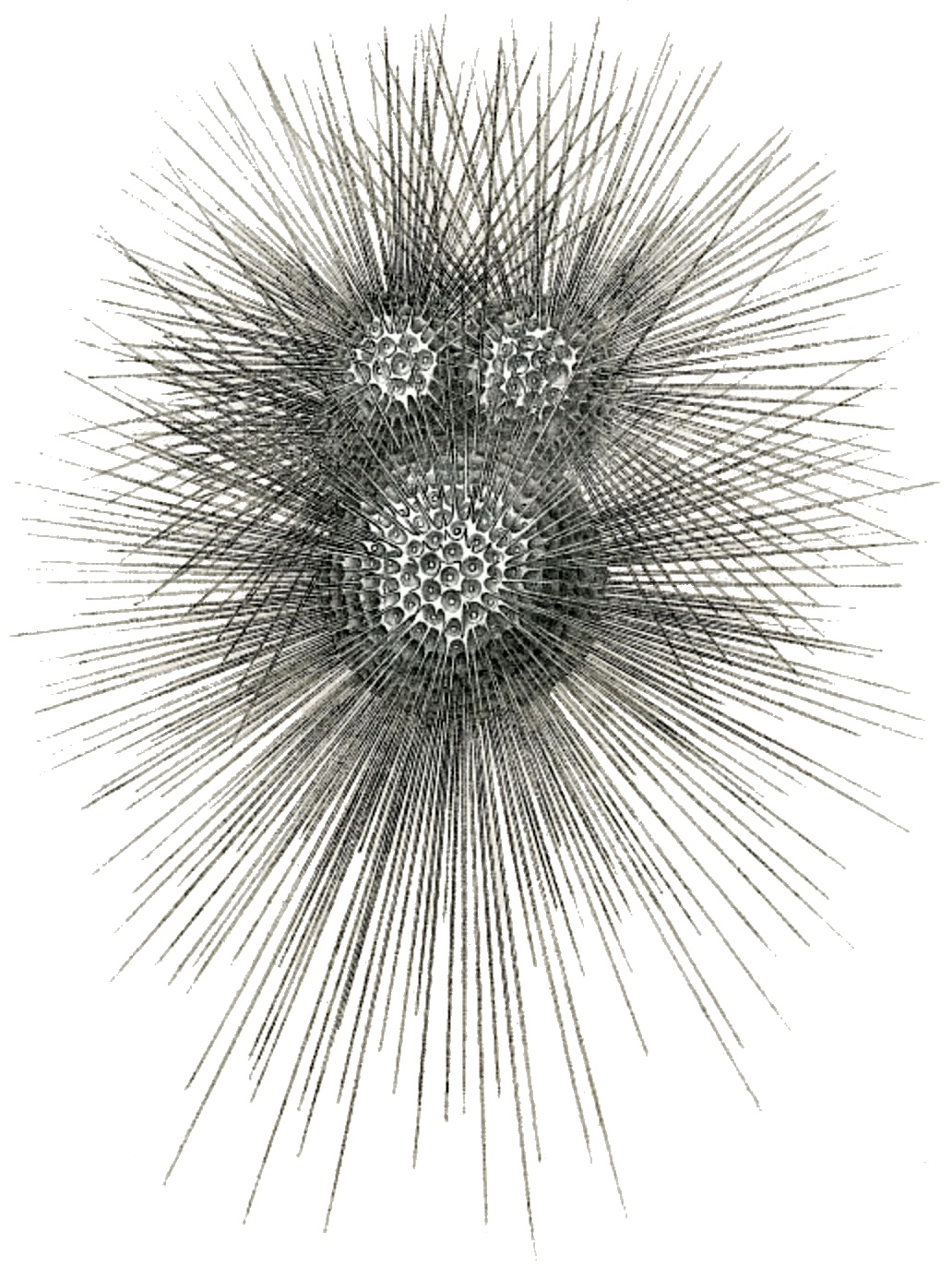
Test of the foraminifer Globigerina bulloides with defensive spines, drawn by paleontologist Henry Bowman Brady in 1884.

Henry Brady published much on foraminiferans, and several species were named after him, including Valvulinerea bradyana (Fornasini, 1900), Trifarina bradyi Cushman, 1923, Rosalina bradyi Cushman, 1915, Robertinoides bradyi (Cushman & Parker, 1936), Neoeponides bradyi (Le Calvez, 1974), Fursenkoina bradyi (Cushman, 1922), Evolvocassidulina bradyi Norman, 1881, Ehrenbergina bradyi Cushman, 1922, Cassidulinoides bradyi (Norman, 1881), Parrina bradyi (Millett, 1898), Labrospira bradyi (Robertson, 1891), Karreriella bradyi (Cushman, 1911), Hemisphaerammina bradyi (Loeblich & Tappan, 1957), Dorothia bradyana (Cushman, 1936).

== Sources ==
- Jones, Robert Wynn. "Brady, Henry Bowman (1835–1891)". Oxford Dictionary of National Biography (online ed.). Oxford University Press. doi:10.1093/ref:odnb/3215. (Subscription, Wikipedia Library access or UK public library membership required.)
