= Payer Island =

Island in Russia

Native name: остров Пайера
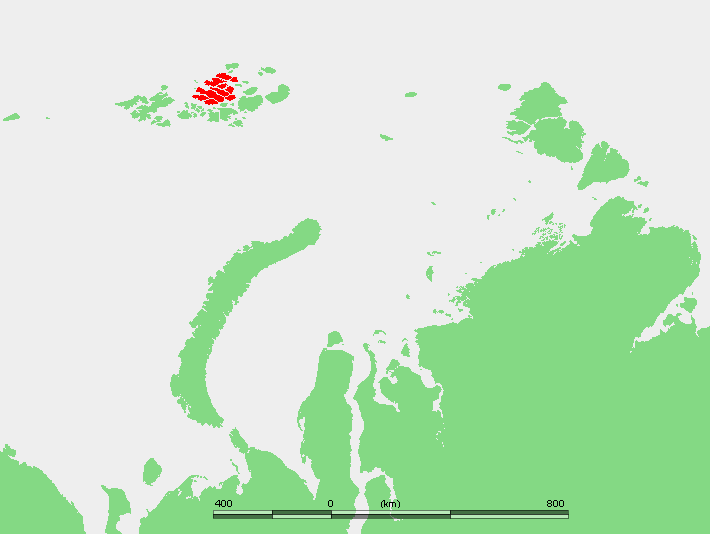
- Location of the Zemlya Zichy subgroup in Franz Josef Land

- Location within Russia

Geography
- Location: Arctic Ocean
- Coordinates: 80.58°N 60.5°E
- Archipelago: Franz Josef Land
- Area: 151 km^{2} (58 sq mi)
- Length: 20 km (12 mi)
- Width: 12.5 km (7.77 mi)
- Highest elevation: 452 m (1483 ft)
- Highest point: Kupol Frolova

Administration
- Russia
- Oblast: Arkhangelsk Oblast

Demographics
- Population: 0

Payer Island (Russian: остров Пайера, romanized: ostrov Payera) is an island in Franz Josef Land, Russia.

This island was named after Julius Johannes Ludovicus von Payer an Austro-Hungarian arctic explorer and an Arctic landscape artist, one of the leaders of the Austro-Hungarian North Pole Expedition.

== Geography ==
Payer Island is part of the Zichy Land subgroup of the Franz Josef Land. Its area is 151 km^{2} and it lies to the SE of Jackson Island. The headland at the northern end is Mys Nordik. The center of the island is covered by an ice dome named Kupol Frolova (Купол Фролова). Its highest point reaches 452 m (1,483 ft).

=== Adjacent islands ===
Very close to Payer Island, off its easternmost point, lie some small islands:

- Stoliczka Island (Остров Столичка), the island farther offshore, is the site of a large walrus rookery. Lat 81° 11′ N, long 58° 16′ E. This island was named after Moravian paleontologist Ferdinand Stoliczka (1838–1874) by the Austro-Hungarian North Pole Expedition.
- Apollo Island (Ostrov Apollonova) lies in the sound between Stoliczka and Payer Island. It is only 500 m across.
- Milovzorov Rocks (Рифы Миловзорова), rocks awash located off the NE shore of Payer Island.

== See also ==
- List of islands of Russia
- List of glaciers of Russia

== Bibliography ==
- Clements R. Markham, The Lands of Silence
