= Salisbury Island (Russia) =

Island located in central area of Franz Josef Land, Russia

Остров Солсбери
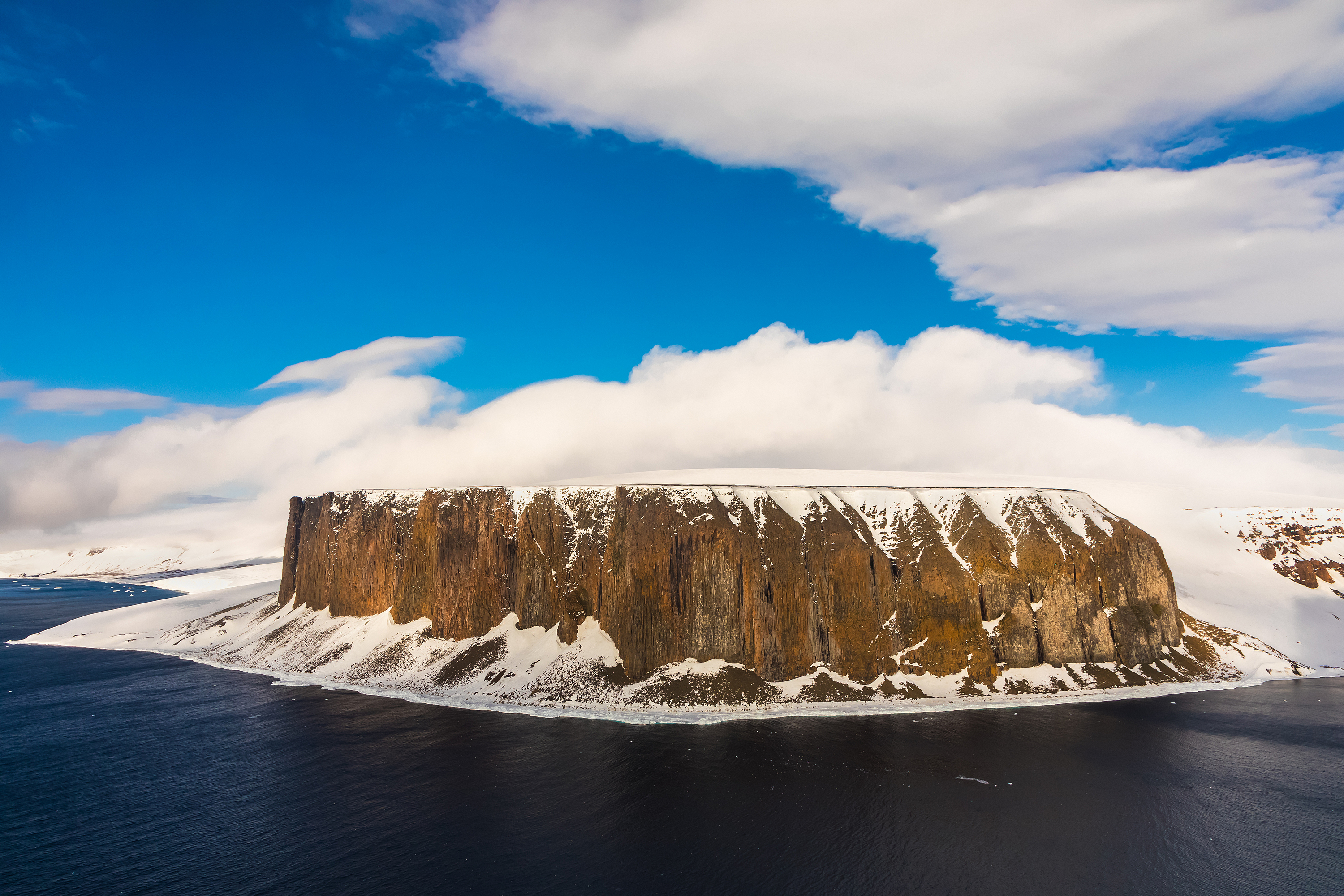
- View of Cape Fischer

- Location in the Zichy Land subgroup of the Franz Josef Archipelago.

Geography
- Location: Arctic
- Coordinates: 80°55′N 56°08′E
- Archipelago: Zichy Land, Franz Josef Archipelago
- Highest elevation: 482 m (1581 ft)
- Highest point: Unnamed

Administration
- Russian Federation

Demographics
- Population: 0

Salisbury Island, (Russian: Остров Солсбери; Ostrov Solsberi) is an island located in the central area of Franz Josef Land, Russia.

== Geography ==
Salisbury Island is relatively large and long, having a surface of 960 km^{2}. Its highest point is 482 m and practically the entire surface of the island is glacierized.

Salisbury Island is part of the Zichy Land subgroup of the Franz Josef Archipelago. It has very little open sea around it, being wedged between Luigi Island and Champ Island on its southwestern shores, Ziegler Island in the northeast and Wiener Neustadt Island in the east.

The island was named by Frederick George Jackson during his 1894–1897 expedition. A possible source for the name is geology professor Rollin D. Salisbury (1858-1922), of the University of Chicago. Salisbury was second-in-command on the Peary relief expedition. It is also possible that Jackson named the island after Lord Salisbury or the Salisbury Steak, which had risen to prominence as a popular fad diet at the time.

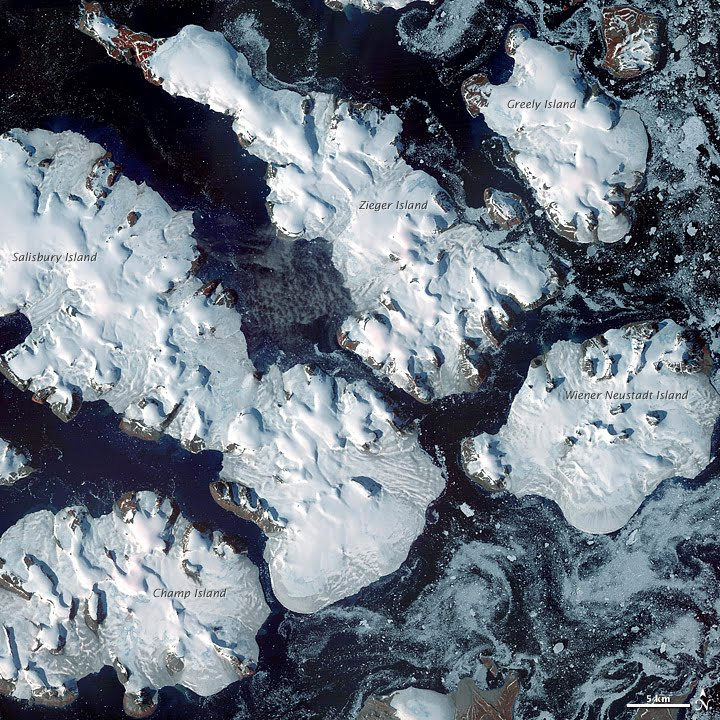
Various islands of central Franz Josef Land

== Adjacent Islands ==
- Elisabeth Island (Остров Елизаветы; Ostrov Yelizavety) is a 5 km long oval-shaped island lying 7 km off Salisbury Island's northwestern end. Unglacierized; highest point 121 m. Frederick George Jackson named this island after his mother, Mary Elizabeth Jackson.
- Ostrova Kuchina (Острова Кучина). These are two very small islets off Salisbury Island's northeastern coast; one of them is very close to the shore. They were named after Russian Arctic explorer Alexander Kuchin, the only Russian on Amundsen’s expedition to the South Pole on the Fram. Kuchin was lost in Vladimir Rusanov's ill-fated expedition from Spitsbergen on ship Gerkules in 1912.
