= Gogenloe Island =

Island in Franz Josef Land, Russia

Coordinates: 81°42′N 58°30′E

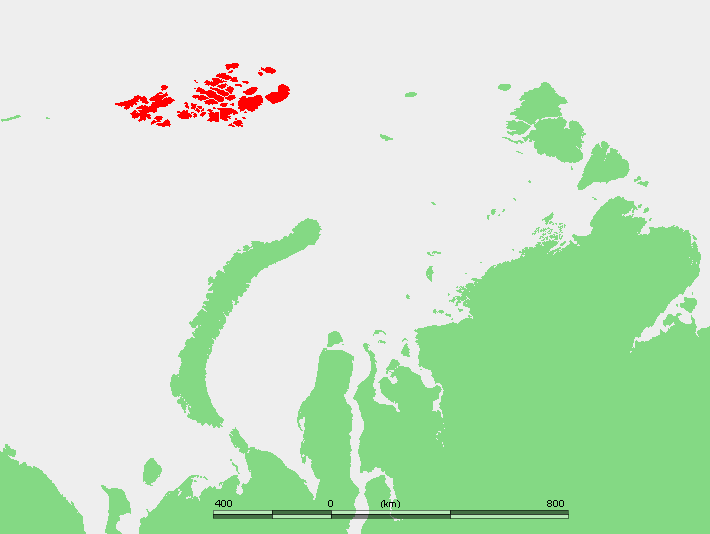
Location of the Franz Josef Archipelago

Gogenloe Island (Russian: остров Гогенлоэ), also known as Hohenlohe, is an island in Franz Josef Land, Russia.

Gogenloe Island is located roughly halfway between Rudolf Island and Karl-Alexander Island. Its maximum length is 6 kilometers (3.7 mi) and its area is 38 square kilometers (15 sq mi).

Gogenloe Island was named after the German princely dynasty Hohenlohe.

== Adjacent islands ==
- Oktyabryata Islands (острова Октябрята) is a group of islets off Gogenloe Island's northeastern shore. They are located at a latitude of 81° 37' N and a longitude of 58° 54' E. These islands were named after the Russian October Revolution. Ostrov Kupolok and Maly are two of the islands of the small group.
