= Arthur Island =

Island in Franz Josef Land, Russia

Остров Артура
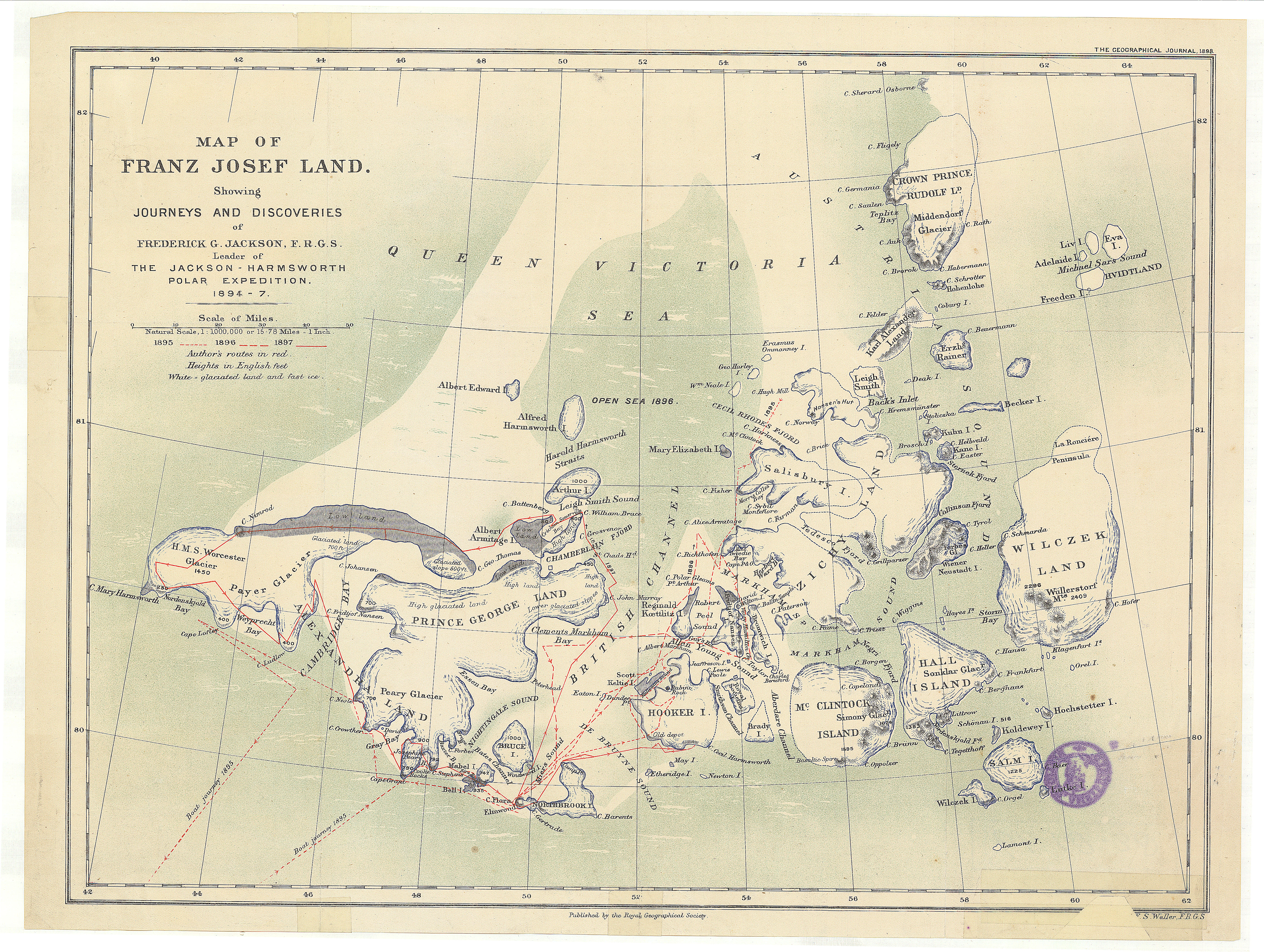
- Arthur Island in an 1898 Franz Josef Land map showing Frederick G. Jackson's explorations

- Location within Russia

Geography
- Location: Queen Victoria Sea, Arctic Ocean
- Coordinates: 81°08′N 50°41′E
- Archipelago: Franz Josef Archipelago
- Area: 111 km^{2} (43 sq mi)
- Highest elevation: 275 m (902 ft)

Administration
- Russia

Arthur Island (Russian: Остров Артура; Ostrov Artura) is an island in Franz Josef Land, Russia. It belongs administratively to the Arkhangelsk Oblast of the Russian Federation.

== Geography ==
Arthur Island lies in the Queen Victoria Sea north of Zemlya Georga, relatively far from any other island. Its area is 111 km^{2} (43 sq mi) and its maximum height is 275 m (902 ft).

Arthur Island is practically completely glacierized. Only a small area (Mys Ledovoy Razvedky) in the northwestern shores of the island and another (Mys Nizkiy) in the southernmost point of the island are free of glacier ice.

This island was named by Frederick George Jackson after his brother Arthur Jackson, in the Jackson-Harmsworth Polar Expedition.

== See also ==
- List of islands of Russia
