= Luigi Island =

Island in Franz Josef Land, northern Russia

Coordinates: 80.7917°N 54.9572°E

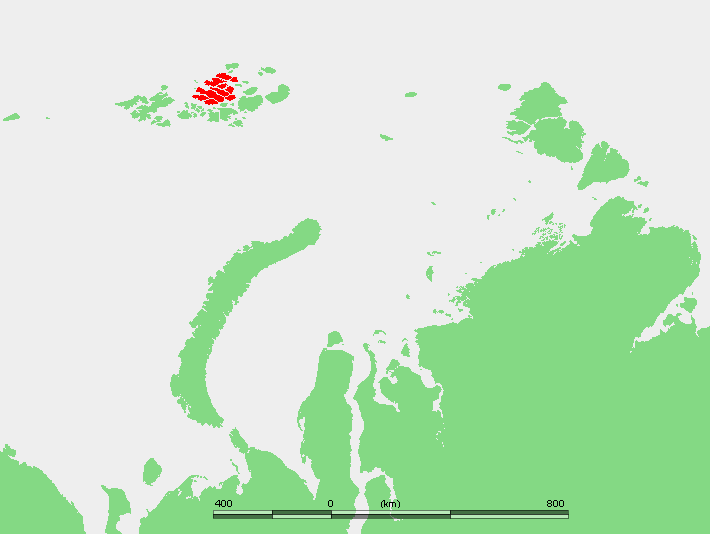
Location of the Zemlya Zichy subgroup of the Franz Josef Archipelago. Luigi Island is its westernmost island.

Luigi Island (Russian: Остров Луиджи; Ostrov Luidzhi) is an island in Franz Josef Land, Russian Federation.

Luigi Island has a surface of 371 km^{2} and it is heavily glacierized. The highest point of the island is 442 m.

Luigi Island is part of the Zichy Land subgroup of the Franz Josef Archipelago. It is separated by narrow channels from Salisbury Island in the northeast and from Champ Island in the southeast.

The broad channel in the west of Luigi Island is known as Markham Channel (Пролив маркама; Proliv Markama), after British polar explorer Admiral Sir Albert Hastings Markham.

Luigi Island was named after Italian mountaineer and explorer Luigi Amedeo, Duke of the Abruzzi.
