= Wiener Neustadt Island =

Island in Franz Josef Land, Russian Federation

остров Винер-Нойштадт
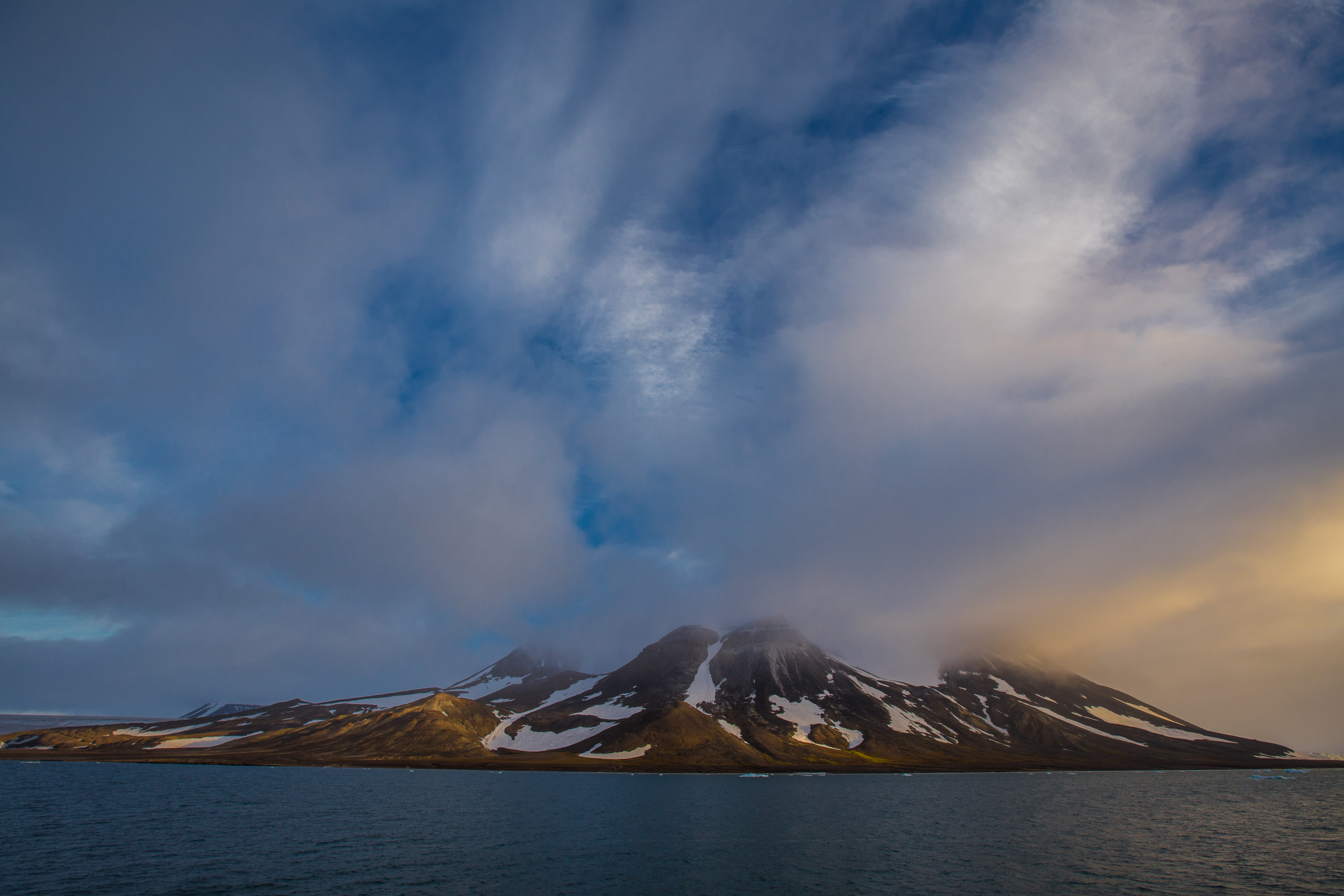
- View of Wiener Neustadt Island

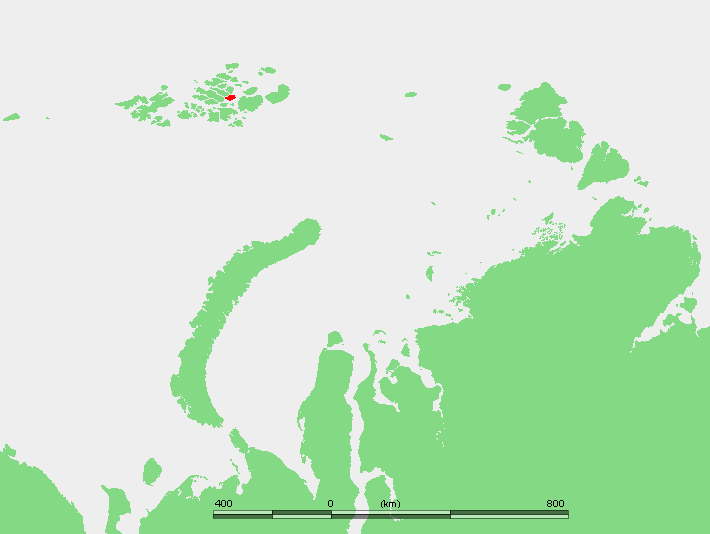
- Location of Wiener Neustadt Island in Franz Josef Land

Geography
- Location: Arctic
- Coordinates: 80°48′N 58°20′E
- Archipelago: Franz Josef Archipelago
- Area: 237 km^{2} (92 sq mi)
- Length: 22 km (13.7 mi)
- Width: 16 km (9.9 mi)
- Highest elevation: 620 m (2030 ft)
- Highest point: Peak Parnass

Administration
- Russia

Demographics
- Population: 0

Wiener Neustadt Island (Russian: Остров Винер-Нёйштадт, romanized: Ostrov Viner-Nyoyshtadt, also Остров Винер-Нойштадт, Ostrov Viner-Noyshtadt) is an island in Franz Josef Land, Russia.

== History ==
This island was named after Wiener Neustadt, a town located south of Vienna, by the Payer-Weyprecht Austro-Hungarian Arctic expedition.

== Geography ==
Wiener Neustadt Island is part of the Zichy Land subgroup of the Franz Josef Archipelago. It is separated from Ziegler Island and Salisbury Island by the narrow Collinson Sound.

Wiener Neustadt Island's area is 237 km^{2} and it is almost completely glacierized. The highest point of this island, Peak Parnass, is 620 m, the highest in Franz Josef Land.

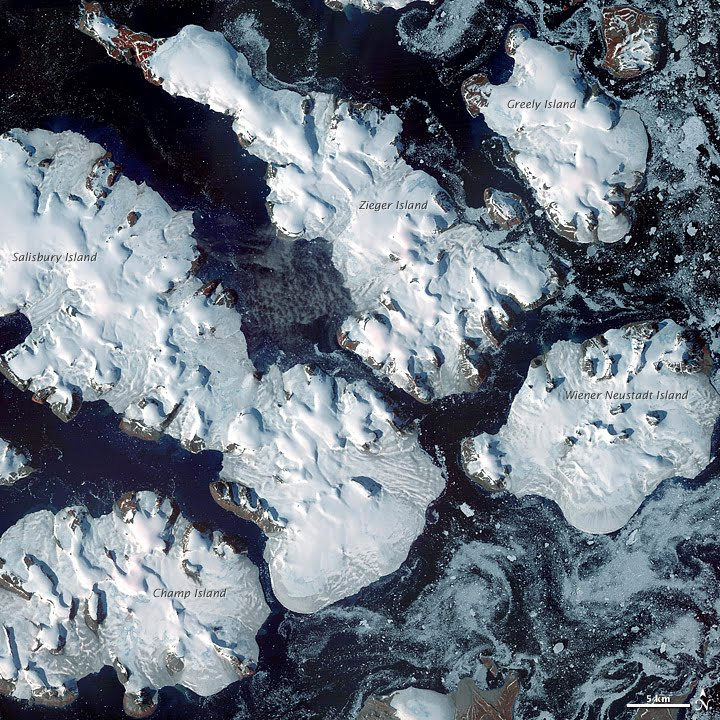
Various islands of Franz Josef Land
