= John Stephenson Rowntree =

British businessman and Quaker (1834–1907)

John Stephenson Rowntree (2 May 1834 – 13 April 1907) was a Director of Rowntree's, the York confectionery company and a reformer of the Quaker movement in the United Kingdom. He was the eldest son of Joseph Rowntree (1801–1859) and his wife Sarah Stephenson (1807–1888).

He married Elizabeth Hotham (1835–1875) on 25 August 1858. They had nine children. Following her death, he married, on 10 April 1878, Helen Doncaster (1833–1920).

His book, Quakerism Past and Present (1859), written at the age of 24, analyses the state of nineteenth-century British Quakerism and was a cause of some essential reforms. He supported Quaker education in York and the training of women teachers and the higher education of women, in general. He was editor of The Friend from 1875 to 1878.

He was an ardent botanist, a keen archaeologist, and well versed in the history of York. He was elected Lord Mayor of York in 1880 and during his aldermanship devoted himself to putting the city's unsatisfactory finances on to a sound basis.

After his death, some of his writings were collected and published by his sister-in-law, Phebe Doncaster, together with a memoir, as John Stephenson Rowntree, his life and work.
