= Nansen Island (Franz Josef Land) =

Island in Russia

Russian: остров Нансена
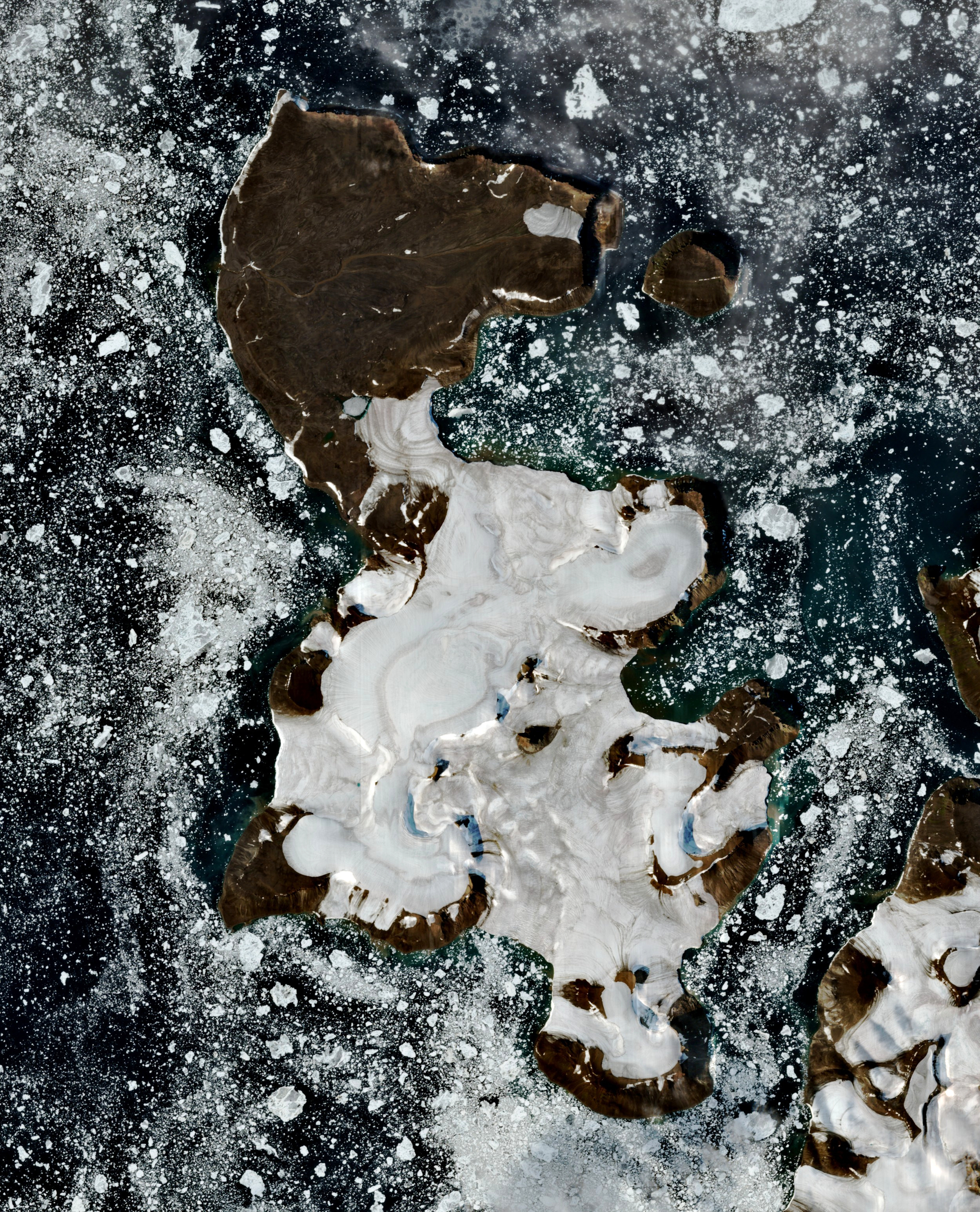
- Sentinel-2 image (2020)

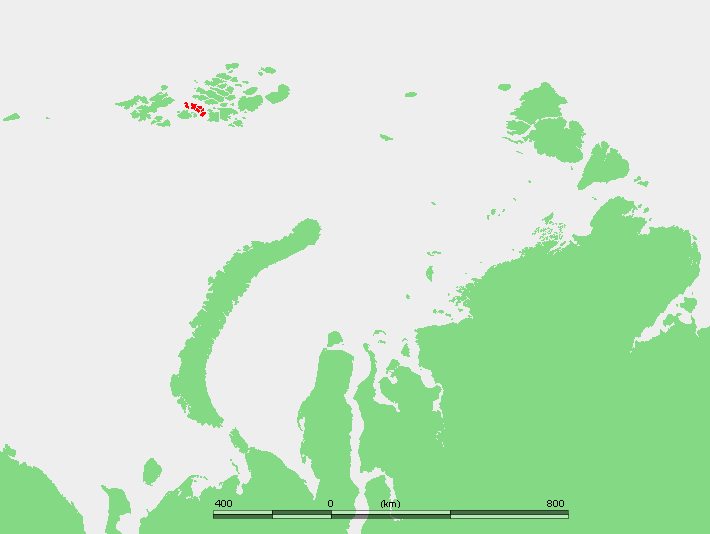
- Location of the group formed by Nansen Island and its adjacent islands in the Franz Josef Archipelago

Geography
- Coordinates: 80.5°N 54.1°E
- Archipelago: Franz Josef Archipelago
- Area: 164 km^{2} (63 sq mi)
- Highest elevation: 372 m (1220 ft)

Administration
- Russia

Demographics
- Population: 0

Nansen Island (Russian: о́стров На́нсена; Ostrov Nansena) is an island in Franz Josef Land, Russia. The island is partly glaciated and its area is 164 km^{2} (63 sq mi). The highest point of the island is 372 m (1,220 ft).

Nansen Island is named in the honor and memory of Arctic explorer Fridtjof Nansen, who explored and charted the Franz Josef Archipelago in 1896.

== Geography ==
The island is located in the center of a cluster of islands of similar size separated from each other by narrow sounds. The channel to the southwest of the subgroup is Proliv Allen-Yung (пролив Аллен-Юнг), the one at the southeast is Proliv Sidorova (пролив Сидорова), the channel to the northeast is the Markham Sound (пролив Маркама), and the one in the west is the Proliv Britansky Kanal (пролив Британский Канал).

Mys Artura is the cape in the north of the island. The cape in the southwest is known as Mys Ushakova, after Russian Arctic explorer Georgy Ushakov, and the southernmost point is called Mys Teylora (Cape Taylor).

=== Adjacent islands ===
==== Wilton Island ====
Ostrov Uiltona (Остров Уилтона), Wilton Island is a small island off Nansen Island's northeastern coast. It is separated from it by a 1 km (0.62 mi) narrow sound. It was named after Scottish explorer David W. Wilton of the 1894-1897 Jackson-Harmsworth expedition. Wilton had lived for some years in the north of Russia before joining the expedition.

==== Bromwich Island ====
Ostrov Bromidzh (Остров Бромидж), Bromwich Island lies east of Nansen Island; (lat 80.49 long 54.9). It is covered by an ice-cap, but it has a few unglacierized areas at small points near its shores. Maximum height 392 m (1,286 ft).

==== Brice Island ====
Ostrov Braysa' (Остров Брайса), Brice Island lies south of Bromwich Island. There is an icecap in the middle of the island but large swathes of land are unglacierized in the north and southwest. It has a maximum height of 409 m (1,342 ft). This island was named after U.S. senator Calvin S. Brice who had donated $ 200 to the Wellman expedition.

==== Pritchett Island ====
Ostrov Pritchetta (Остров Притчетта), Pritchett Island lies off Nansen Island's southern shore. This island is quite large and has a few areas free of glaciers. Highest point 401 m (1,316 ft). The name of this island most likely honours Henry Smith Pritchett, who was involved in the scientific advisory committee for Wellman's expedition.

==== Bliss Island ====
Ostrov Blissa (Остров Блисса), Bliss Island lies south of Pritchett Island. It is partly unglacierized. Wellman named this island after U.S. Secretary of the Interior Cornelius Newton Bliss who donated 250 $ to the expedition.

==== Jefferson Island ====
Ostrov Dzheffersona (Остров Джефферсона), Jefferson Island is a much smaller island lying off Nansen Island's southwestern shore. The island first appears as Jeaffreson Island on the maps of the Jackson-Harmsworth expedition. Contemporary Arctic explorer J. Russel-Jeaffreson, who helped with the preparation for the expedition, may be the source for the name.

==== Koetlitz Island ====
Ostrov Ketlitsa (Остров Кётлица), Koetlitz Island is a long island which lies off the northwestern tip of Nansen island. Glacierized, maximum height 158 m (518 ft). The cape at its northern end is known as Mys Polyarnogo Siyaniya and its southernmost came is Mys Giuys. The channel separating this island from Nansen island is known as Proliv Roberta Piliya. Koetlitz Island was named in honor of the geologist of the Jackson-Harmsworth expedition, Dr. Reginald Koettlitz.

== See also ==
- List of islands of Russia
