= Harley Island =

Island in Russia, part of Franz Josef Land

Остров Харли
- Location in the central Franz Josef Archipelago.

- Location within Russia

Geography
- Coordinates: 81°18′40″N 54°22′11″E
- Archipelago: Franz Josef Land
- Length: 10 km (6 mi)
- Highest elevation: 82 m (269 ft)

Administration
- Arkhangelsk Oblast, Russia

Demographics
- Population: 0

Harley Island (Russian: Остров Харли) is an island located in Franz Josef Land, Arkhangelsk Oblast, Russian Federation. This island is part of the Zichy Land subgroup of the central part of the archipelago.

This island was named after Scottish physician George Harley by English Arctic explorer Frederick Jackson.

== Geography ==
Harley Island is a 10 km (6.2 mi) long and narrow island. It lies 15 km (9.3 mi) off Jackson Island's western shore. The island is quite flat, its highest point being only 82 m (269 ft).

== History ==
Fridtjof Nansen wintered on the island in 1895–1896. Umberto Cagni and Prince Luigi Amedeo of Savoy camped on the island on 13 June 1900.

== See also ==
- List of islands of Russia
