= Schübelerøya =

Island in Svalbard, Norway

- Schübelerøya (Svalbard)

Geography
- Location: Arctic
- Coordinates: 80°24′12″N 25°49′42″E
- Archipelago: Svalbard
- Highest elevation: 10 m (30 ft)

Administration
- Norway

Demographics
- Population: 0

Schübelerøya (Schübeler Island) is an island in Svalbard, Norway.

== Geography ==
The island has a maximum altitude of 10 m (30 ft). Just to the north of Schübelerøya lie the slightly larger Brochøya and Foynøya. These three islands are located about 20 km off the north coast of Nordaustlandet.

== History ==
The first confirmed sighting of the island was made by Benjamin Leigh Smith in 1871. It was named in honour of Frederik Schübeler, a Norwegian botanist. In 1928, the island was visited by two men, Gennaro Sora and Sjef van Dongen, in search of the lost crew of Umberto Nobile's airship Italia.

== See also ==
- List of islands of Norway
