= Mabel Island (Franz Josef Land) =

Island in Franz Josef Land, Russia

Russian: Остров Мейбел
- Area map section showing Mabel Island near the bottom

- Location within Russia

Geography
- Location: Arctic
- Coordinates: 80°02′N 49°30′E
- Archipelago: Franz Josef Archipelago
- Area: 40 km^{2} (15 sq mi)
- Length: 9.5 km (5.9 mi)
- Width: 7 km (4.3 mi)
- Highest elevation: 356 m (1168 ft)

Administration
- Russia

Demographics
- Population: 0

Mabel Island (Russian: Остров Мейбел) is an island in Franz Josef Land, Russia. Its area is 40 square kilometres (15 sq mi).

== History ==
This island was named by Benjamin Leigh Smith after his niece Amable Ludlow (1860–1939).

The southernmost headland of Mabel Island is Cape Konrad, named after Russian sailor Alexander Konrad, one of the only two survivors of the Brusilov expedition.

== Geography ==
Mabel Island lies 4 km (2 mi) off Bruce Island's southwestern shore. The highest point is 356 m (1,168 ft). Most of the island is covered by an ice cap, but an area at the southwestern side is unglacierized. Mys Pinegina is the headland on the eastern side.

Bates Channel is the roughly 4 km (2 mi) sound to the north and northeast of Mabel Island that separates it from Bruce Island. The sound in the western side, beyond which lies Zemlya Georga to the NW, is known as the Nightingale Channel (Proliv Naytingeyl).

Ostrov Bell (Остров Белл; Bell Island) is a smaller non glacierized island lying off Mabel Island's southwestern shore, separated from it by the Eyre Channel, a narrow sound of only 500 m (1,640 ft) in some places.

== See also ==
- List of islands of Russia
