= Tikhaya Bay =

Tikhaya Bay (Russian: Бухта Тихая, translated as "Quiet Bay") may refer to one of the following places.

- A bay on Hooker Island, Franz Josef Land, Russia.
- A bay and microdistrict in Vladivostok, Russia.
