= Benjamin Leigh Smith =

English Arctic explorer and yachtsman (1828–1913)

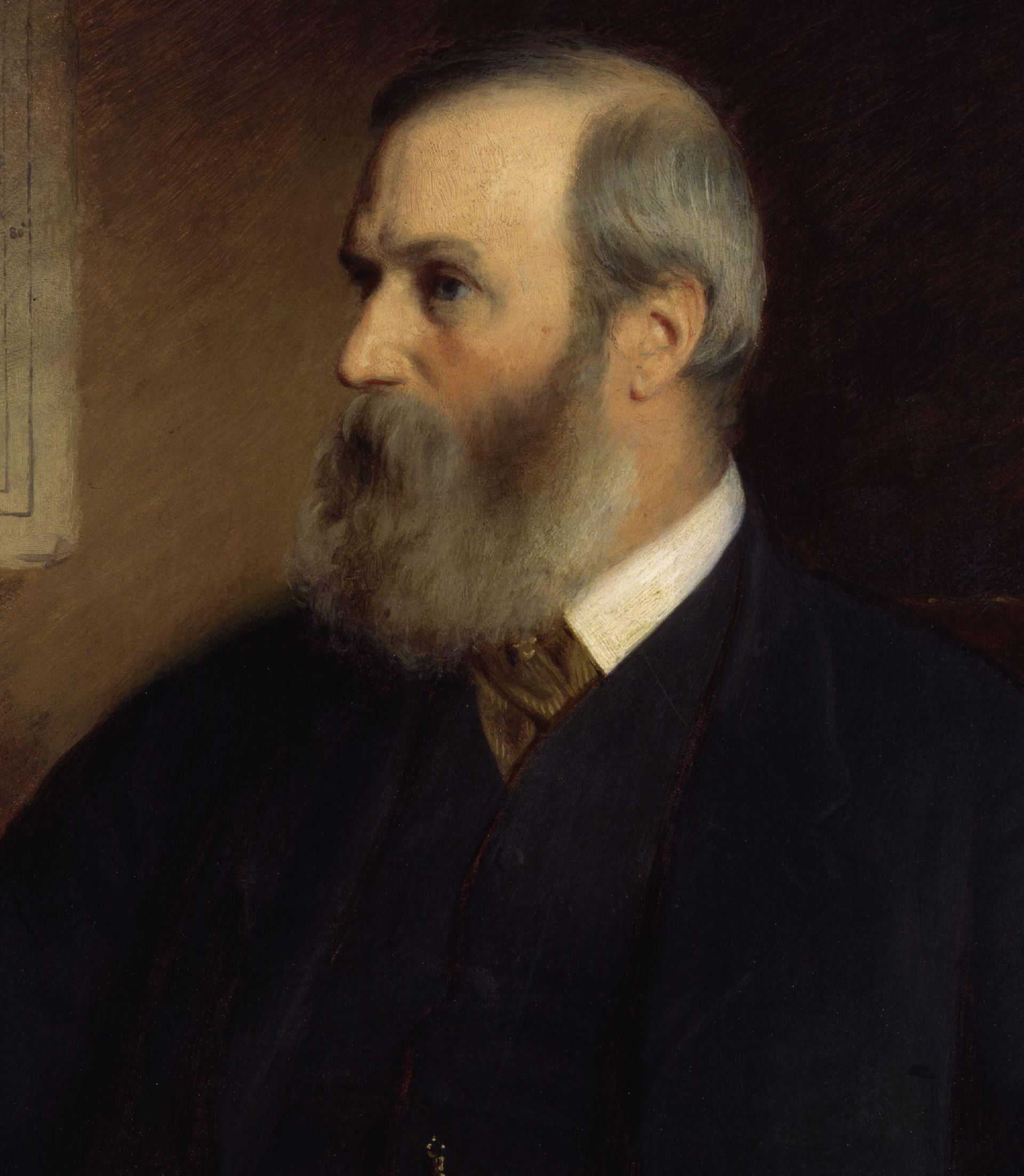
- Portrait by Stephen Pearce, 1886
- Born: Benjamin Leigh Smith; 12 March 1828; Whatlington, Sussex, England
- Died: 4 January 1913 (aged 84); Hampstead, London, England
- Occupations: Arctic explorer, yachtsman
- Years active: 1871–1882 (as explorer)
- Father: Benjamin Leigh Smith
- Family: William Smith (grandfather)
- Awards: Royal Order of the Polar Star (1874); Prix d'Alexandre de la Roquette pour les travaux géographiques sur la géographie des pays du Nord (1880); Royal Geographical Society's Patron's Medal (1881)

Benjamin Leigh Smith (12 March 1828 – 4 January 1913) was an English Arctic explorer and yachtsman. He was the grandson of the abolitionist William Smith.

== Early life ==
He was born in Whatlington, Sussex, the extramarital child of Anne Longden, a milliner from Alfreton, and the Whig politician Benjamin Smith (1783–1860), eldest son of William Smith, an abolitionist.

On a visit to his sister in Derbyshire in 1826, Benjamin senior met Anne Longden. She became pregnant by him and he took her to a rented lodge at Whatlington, a small village near Battle, East Sussex. There she lived as "Mrs Leigh", the surname of his relations on the nearby Isle of Wight. The birth of their first child, Barbara Leigh Smith, created a scandal because the couple did not marry, and within eight weeks Anne was pregnant again. When their son Benjamin was born, the four of them went to America for two years, when another child was conceived.

After their return to Sussex, they lived openly together and had two more children. Subsequently, Anne became ill with tuberculosis and died in Ryde, Isle of Wight, in 1834, when her son Benjamin was five years old.

== Explorations ==
Between 1871 and 1882, Leigh Smith undertook five major scientific expeditions to Svalbard, Jan Mayen, and Franz Josef Land. He brought back specimens for the British Museum and Royal Botanic Gardens, as well as live polar bears for the London Zoo.

=== 1871 expedition to Svalbard ===
On 19 May 1871, Leigh Smith sailed from Grimsby on board the Sampson, an 85-ton schooner built in 1852. The captain Erik Andreas Ulve and the 12 other crew members were Norwegian. The expedition stopped at Tromsø before heading to Svalbard, which was reached on 7 July. Sampson navigated through the ice around the west and north coast of Spitsbergen into Hinlopen Strait. Here Leigh-Smith surveyed what was later named Wilhelm Island, establishing that it was an island. He then continued along the north coast of Nordaustlandet, making the first confirmed sightings of 22 islands including Brochøya, Foynøya, and Schübelerøya. Throughout the voyage, Leigh Smith made a series of temperature measurements, by which he realised that the temperatures increased significantly below the surface and that the oceanic currents around Svalbard make the West side favourable for exploration. On 27 September the expedition returned to Tromsø.

=== 1872 expedition to Jan Mayen and Svalbard ===
The 2nd expedition consisted of 17 men including Leigh Smith and captain John C. Wells. Crew members were signed up from Hull and the Shetland Islands. The expedition left Hull on 13 May 1872. The expedition reached Jan Mayen on 3 June. Temperature measurements at depth were taken by Wells as the crew hunted whales and seals which partly covered the expedition's cost to Leigh Smith. Sampson then continued along the edge of the ice pack to Svalbard. Here further deep sea temperature soundings by Wells further corroborated the supposed warm deep-sea current. By the island Moffen, the ship was damaged by ice and needed to be beached for repairs in Wijdefjorden. Afloat once more, the Sampson encountered at Fuglefjorden Nordenskiöld's Swedish polar expedition on their way North. Leigh Smith returned to Hull on 26 September.

=== 1873 expedition to Svalbard ===
For the 3rd expedition Leigh Smith chartered James Lamont's Arctic exploration vessel Diana (crew of 17) and used Sampson (crew of 13) as a reserve supply tender. It was joined by Herbert Chermside, who was in charge of logkeeping, and naturalist Alfred Edwin Eaton. The objective was to venture beyond the northeast edge of Svalbard and also to search for Nordenskiöld's expedition which had not yet returned. On 13 June, Diana learned from a Norwegian fishing vessel at Danes Island that Nordenskiöld's expedition had been frozen in at Mosselbukta and was starving. Leigh Smith reached the 3 beset ships on the same day and aided them with his provisions. For this act of salvation he later received the Swedish Royal Order of the Polar Star. The expedition undertook some exploring, but did not succeed in reaching much further than previously.

=== Eira ===
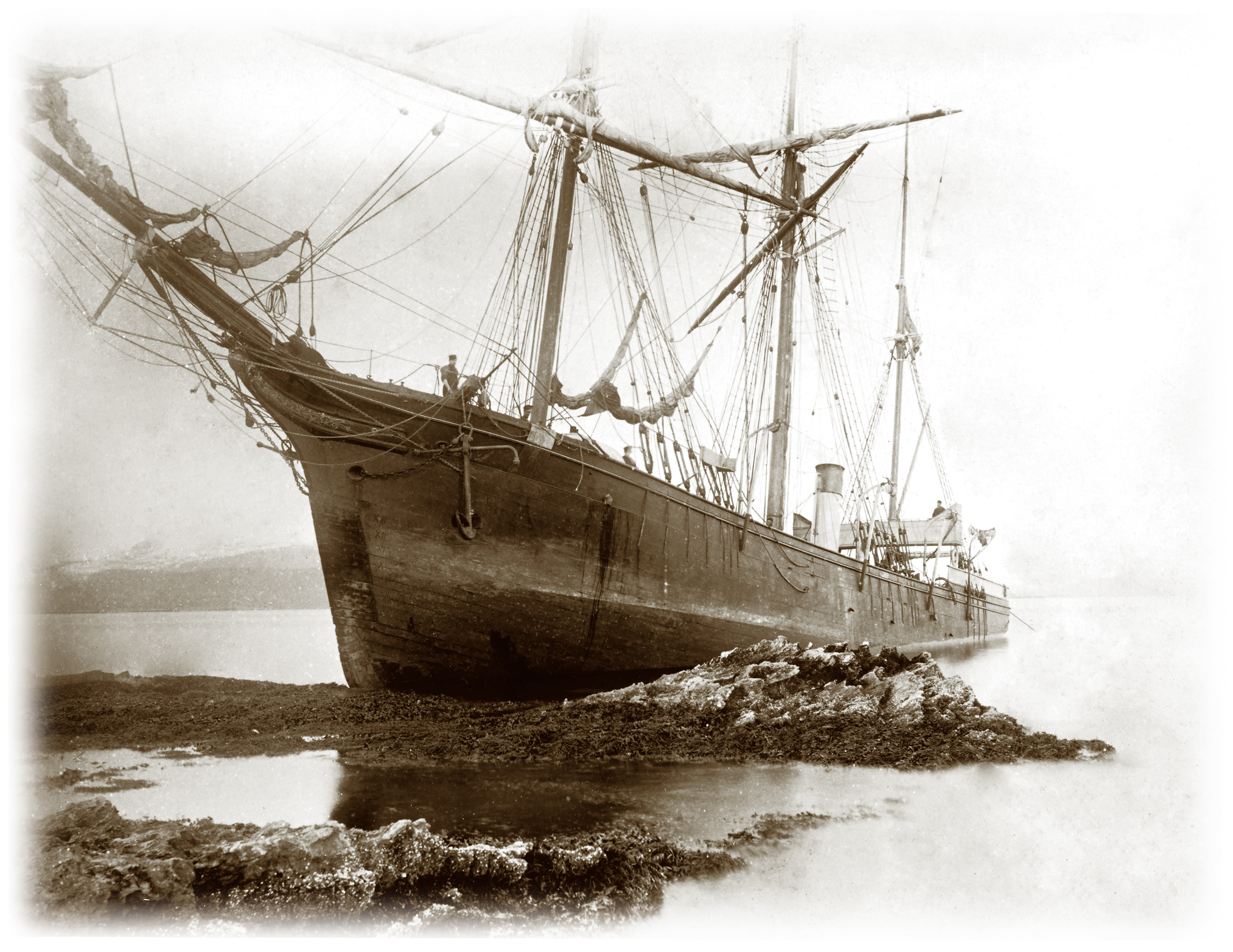
A photograph of Eira, taken by Benjamin Leigh Smith

By his fourth expedition, Leigh Smith's enthusiasm for Arctic exploration had advanced to the point that he had his own vessel—Eira—specially built. Eira was built at the Scottish shipyard of Stephen & Forbes at Peterhead as a three-masted, steam-equipped screw barquentine from 1879 to 1880. John and David Gray pioneered steam engine ships and the Eira was designed along the lines of the whaler Hope and Windward. At 125 feet (38 m) long and 360 tons the Eira was seven feet longer and forty tons heavier than the Windward—built in 1866 with a 30 hp steam engine—but an otherwise close copy. The ship's hull was three feet thick and the bow had a thickness of eight feet. After launching the Eira was towed to Aberdeen where a 50 hp steam engine was installed.

=== 1880 expedition to Franz Josef Land ===
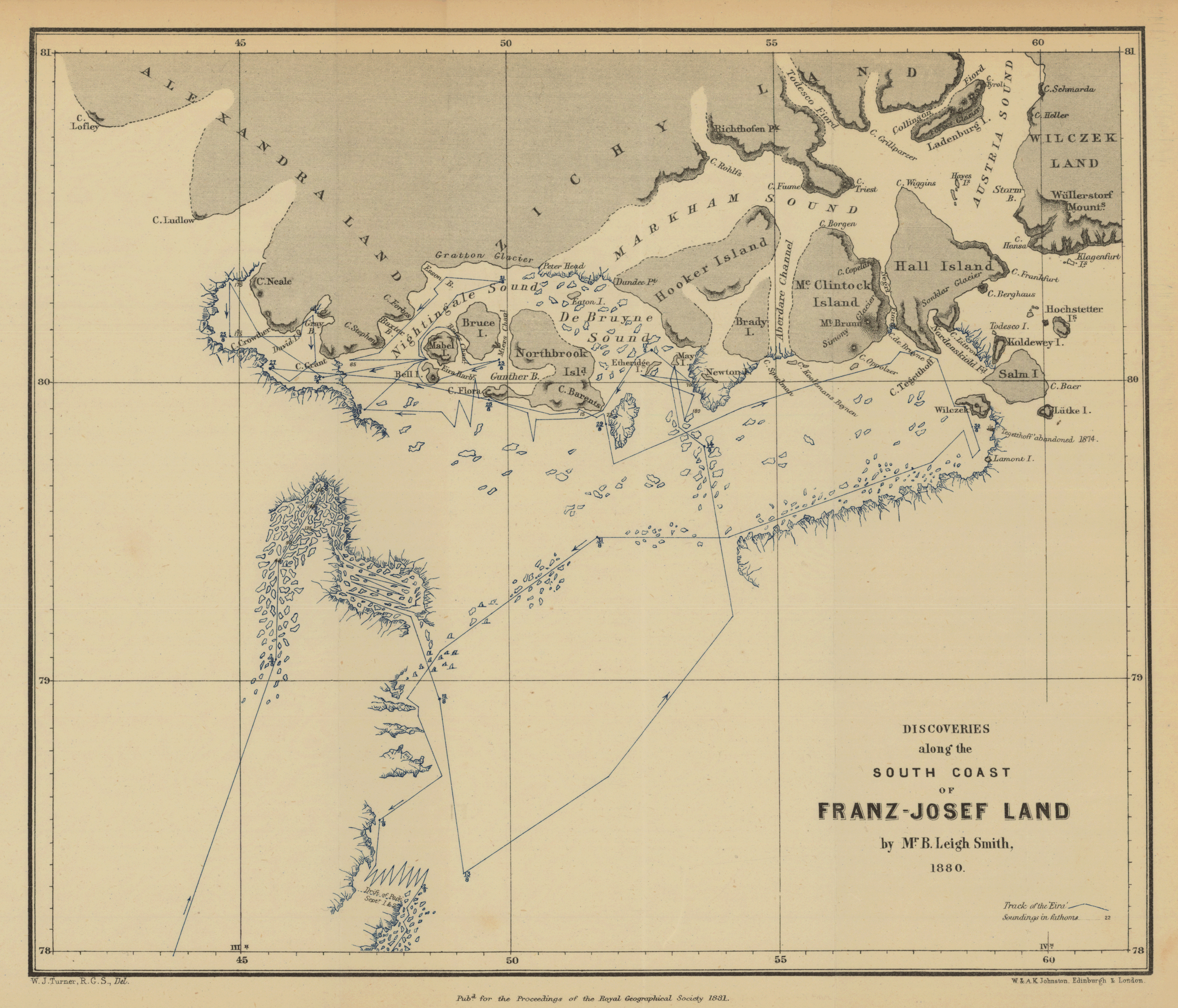
Route of the 1880 expedition

On 19 June 1880, the ship left Aberdeen with Captain William Lofley from Hull as ice master, surgeon William Neale, photographer William John Alexander Grant, two mates, two engineers, and 17 men. On 20 June, four Shetlanders were picked up at Lerwick for the voyage and exploration of Svalbard. On 11 July, John Gray's Hope and David Gray's Eclipse met up with the Eira and Leigh Smith. Grant took a photograph aboard the Eira that included Arthur Conan Doyle along with Leigh Smith, the Gray brothers, Dr. Neale, and, William Lofley.

After finding the northern coast of Svalbard in thick ice, Leigh Smith decided to explore Franz Josef Land, discovered 7 years earlier by the Austro-Hungarian North Pole expedition. On 14 August the expedition sighted May Island which lies in the Western part of Franz Joseph Land that had not previously been explored. The expedition discovered several other islands namely Hooker, Etheridge, Northbrook, Bell, Mabel, Bruce, Eaton, and David Island. The expedition also resulted in the naming of Eira Harbour, Cape Flora, Gratton Glacier, Nightingale Sound, and De Bruyne Sound. The name Alexandra Land was coined to refer to the land to the North, today's Prince George and Alexandra Land. On 1 September, Eira left Franz Josef Land, briefly returning to Svalbard, before arriving in Peterhead on 12 October.

=== 1881–1882 expedition to Franz Josef Land ===
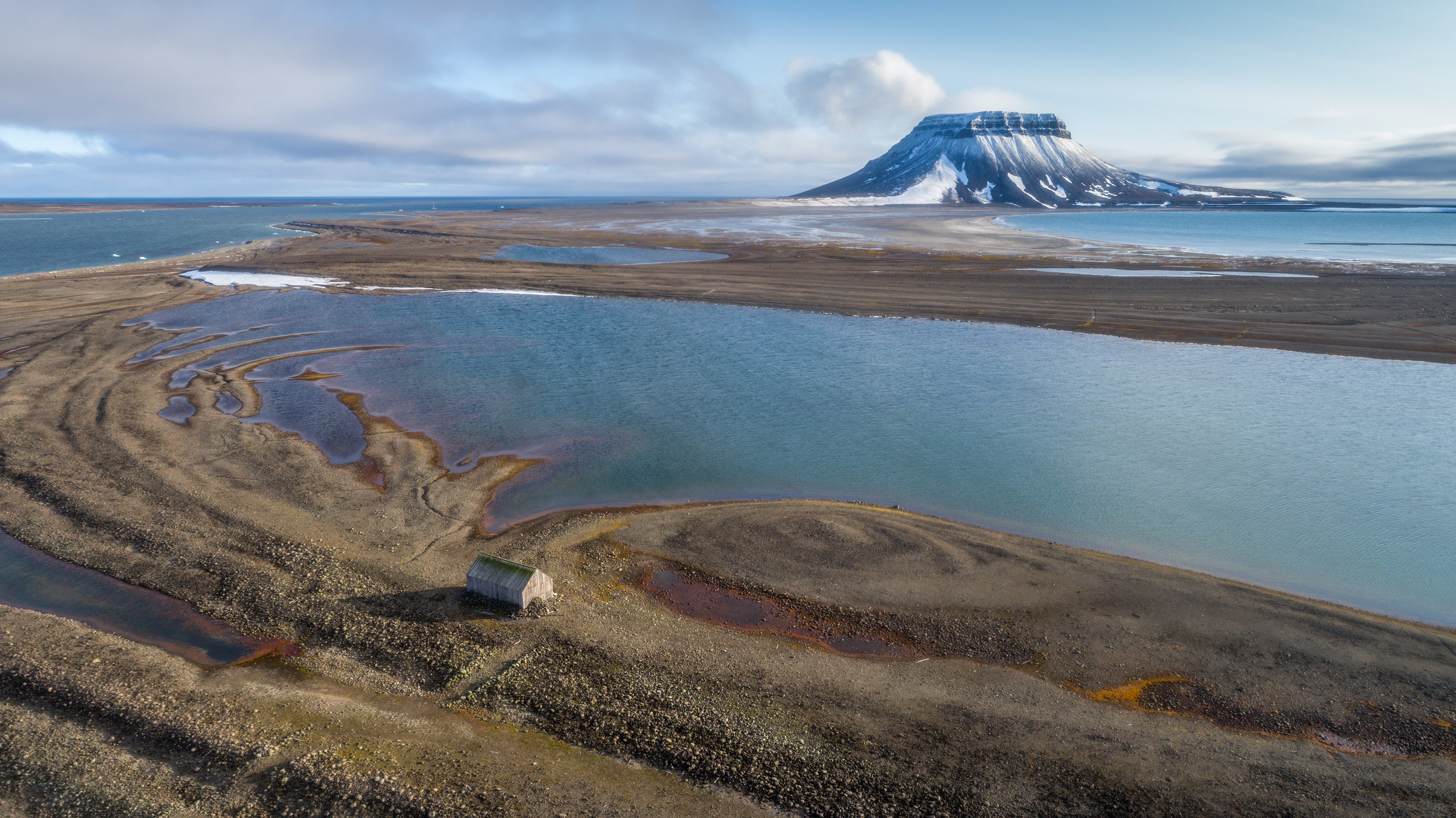
Eira Lodge on Bell Island

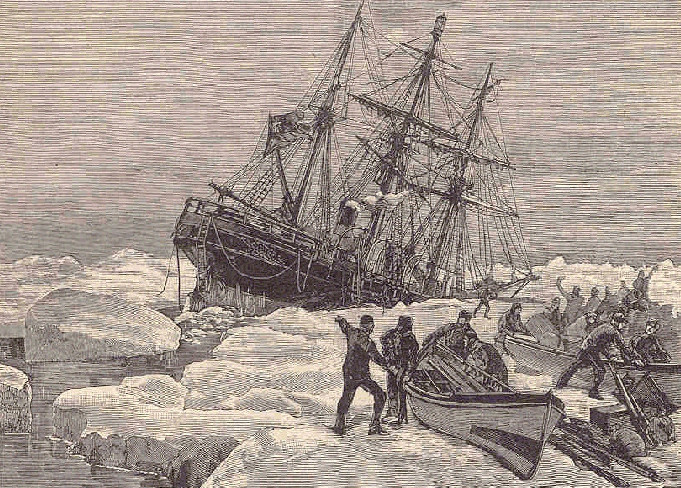
The foundering of the Eira in 1881

The following year the ship departed on a second voyage, leaving Peterhead on 14 June 1881 with a crew of 25. The intention was to establish a base camp in the newly discovered area and exploring further north.

Sighting Franz Josef Land on 23 July, the crew constructed a storehouse on Bell Island which they called Eira Lodge. The ship then steamed to Cape Flora of Northbrook Island, where it was crushed by ice on 22 August. The expedition was forced to abandon ship, though many supplies and 5 boats could be salvaged during its sinking. As the ice initially made it impossible to reach Eira Lodge, they constructed a hut at Cape Flora from stones, planks, spars, and sails they called Flora Cottage. On 1 September one boat managed to reach Eira Lodge and brought additional supplies to Flora Cottage. The expedition survived the Arctic winter supplementing their stored food with hunted bears, birds, and walrus such that they had 2 months worth of provisions left for the planned boat journey south. On 21 June 1882, the sea being sufficiently clear of ice, Leigh Smith ordered the boats into the sea. They made slow progress initially, often being forced to wait for ice channels to form or to haul the boats over ice. On 1 August they got to the open sea not far from Novaya Zemlya. The following day they reached the land and were spotted by the Dutch Arctic exploration ship Willem Barentsz. The expedition members were brought home in the ship Hope of the privately organised "Eira Search and Relief Expedition" under the command of Allen Young, reaching Aberdeen on 20 August.

In August 2017, the sunken Eira was found by the crew of the research vessel Alter Ego during the "Open Ocean: Arctic Archipelagos 2017" expedition using sonar at a depth of about 20 metres (70 ft), off Northbrook Island.

== Reputation and legacy ==
Despite his expertise in the Arctic, Leigh Smith's work has received little attention, although he received the Royal Geographical Society's Patron's Medal in 1881.

Ostrov Li-Smita (Leigh-Smith Island), lying east of Hooker Island (Franz Josef Land), is named after Leigh Smith, as are the glacier Leighbreen and Kapp (Cape) Leigh Smith on Nordaustlandet, Svalbard, Cape Benjamin Smith is located in the Qikiqtaaluk Region of Nunavut, on the south side of Margaret Island where it juts into Queens Channel.
