= Leighbreen =

Glacier at Nordaustlandet, Svalbard, Norway

Coordinates: 80°09.0′N 26°28.4′E

Leighbreen is a glacier on Nordaustlandet, Svalbard. It is located near the northeastern coast. The glacier is named after British explorer Benjamin Leigh Smith, who visited the archipelago several times in the 1870s and 1880s.
