= L. R. Koolemans Beynen =

Royal Dutch Navy officer and Arctic explorer

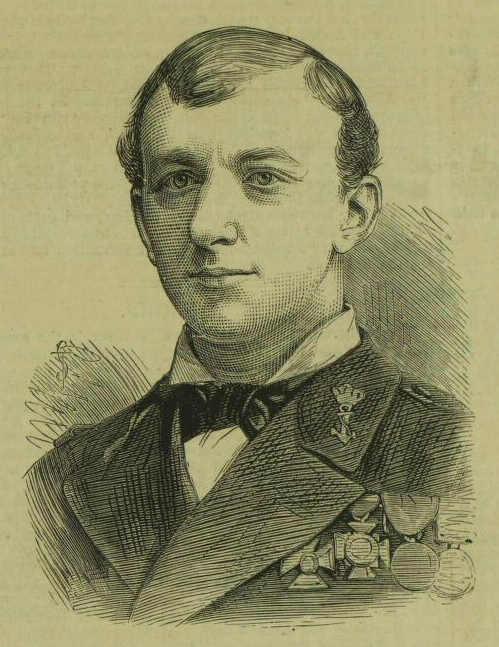

Laurens Reinhart Koolemans Beynen or Laurens Rijnhart Koolemans Beijnen (11 March 1852 – 11 November 1879) was a Royal Dutch Navy officer who took part in Arctic explorations.

== Life and work ==
Route of Pandora in 1875

Beynen was born in the Hague, the third son of Gijsbertus Johannes Willem Koolemans Beijnen and Neeltje Johanna née van der Stok. His uncle Dr. L. R. Beynen, was his godfather and a rector at the Latin school in the Hague. He was educated locally and then went to the Royal Naval Institute in Willemsoord and graduated in 1871. He sailed aboard the training ship Urania and as a midshipman aboard De Rijn he saw the North Sea, Guinea and Sumatra aboard Urania. In 1872 he was aboard HNLMS Wassenaer off the coast of Guinea where he was struck by malaria. In 1873 he went on the Aceh expedition aboard the Zeeland on which he suffered from dysentery and was invalided home. He returned home via the Cape of Good Hope and in 1875 he hoped to join George Nares' expedition to the North Pole but this was too late. He then was supported by Commodore Jansen to go to the Arctic under Sir Allen Young aboard Pandora. Innes-Lillingston was the first officer, the second officer was George Pirie and Beyne was third. He wrote on the Arctic voyages under the title De Reis van de Pandora in den Zomer van 1876 with another edition made for the Hakluyt society. Along with other members of the Pandora's crew he received the Arctic Medal from Queen Victoria. He then sailed in 1878 aboard a new schooner, Willem Barents, on which he was second in command under Lieutenant A. de Bruyne. He returned and suffered from meningitis. In 1879 he went aboard Castor into the North Sea. He was then posted to HNLMS Macassar to Borneo under the command of Baron von Verschuer from Arnhem. The crew met Rajah Brooke and then proceeded to Laboean. He suffered from fatigue, headaches and eye problems aboard Macassar and when his pain became unbearable, he shot himself with a pistol and was buried in the town of Makassar, Sulawesi.
