= Bruce Island (Franz Josef Land) =

Island in Franz Josef Land, Russia

Russian: Остров Брюса
- Location within Russia

Geography
- Location: Arctic
- Coordinates: 80°03′N 50°00′E
- Archipelago: Franz Josef Archipelago
- Area: 191 km^{2} (74 sq mi)
- Highest elevation: 301 m (988 ft)

Administration
- Russia

Demographics
- Population: 0

Bruce Island (Russian: Остров Брюса, romanized: Ostrov Brjusa) is an island in Franz Josef Land, Russia. It lies in southwestern Franz Josef Land, roughly 8.6 kilometres (5.3 mi) southeast of the southeastern coast of Zemlya Georga (Prince George Land) across the Nightingale Channel, and about 11 kilometres (6.8 mi) northwest of Northbrook Island across the Miers Channel. It has an area of 191 square kilometres (74 sq mi). The highest point of the island is about 301 metres (988 ft).

This island was named after Henry Bruce, who succeeded the Earl of Northbrook as President of the Royal Geographical Society.

== History ==
The island was discovered in 1880 by Benjamin Leigh Smith, who roughly mapped it, and named it after Henry Bruce, who succeeded the Earl of Northbrook as President of the Royal Geographical Society. In 1895, the Jackson-Harmsworth Expedition carried out a more detailed mapping and discovered Windward Island, which Jackson named after his expedition ship.

== Geography ==
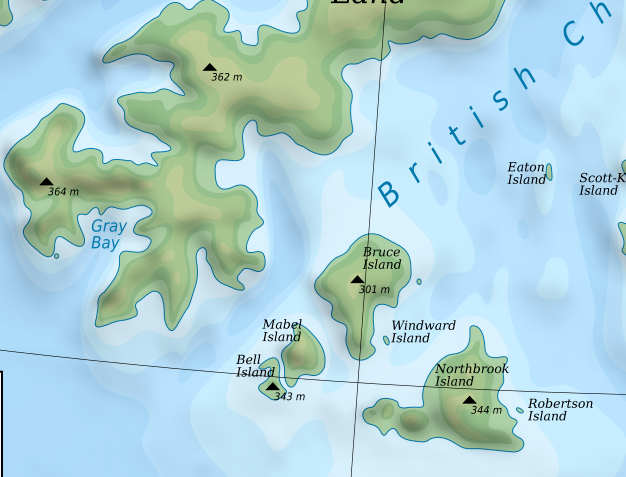
Map showing location of Bruce Island and surrounding islands, to the southeast of the larger Prince George Land in Franz Josef Land

Bruce Island has an area is 191 square kilometres (74 sq mi), and the highest point of the island is about 301 metres (988 ft). It lies in southwestern Franz Josef Land, roughly 8.6 kilometres (5.3 mi) southeast of the southeast coast of Zemlya Georga, and about 11 kilometres (6.8 mi) northwest of Northbrook Island. The smaller Mabel Island is about 3.9 kilometres (2.4 mi) to the southwest of the southern peninsula of Bruce Island, and the much smaller Windward Island is just off the southeastern side.

The Miers Channel runs between Bruce Island and Northbrook Island. The sound running west of Bruce Island, separating it from Zemlya Georga, is known as the Nightingale Channel. To the southwest runs Bates Channel. Except for a very small area at the western shoreline, Bruce Island is completely glacierized. Mys Pinegina is the headland on the eastern side.

=== Nearby islands ===
- Ostrov Meybel (Mabel Island) lies about 3.9 kilometres (2.4 mi) off Bruce Island's southwestern shore. Large swathes of the southwestern part of the island are unglacierized. The highest point is 365 m (1,198 ft). This island was named by Benjamin Leigh Smith after his niece Amable Ludlow (1860–1939).
- Ostrov Bell (Bell Island) is a smaller non glacierized island lying off Mabel Island's southwestern shore, separated from it by a narrow sound which is only 500 m (1,640 ft) in some places. Bell island is crescent shaped and it has a bay that opens to the west. Benjamin Leigh Smith named it thus because it looks like a bell. Bell was also the nickname of his sister Isabella.
- Ostrov Uinduord (Windward Island) is a small island lying close to Bruce Island's southeastern end. It was named by Frederick George Jackson, after his expedition's ship.
- Ostrov Toma (Tom Island) is a very small island lying about 2 kilometres (1.2 mi) off Bruce Island's Eastern coast.
