= Mary Harmsworth, Viscountess Northcliffe =

British viscountess

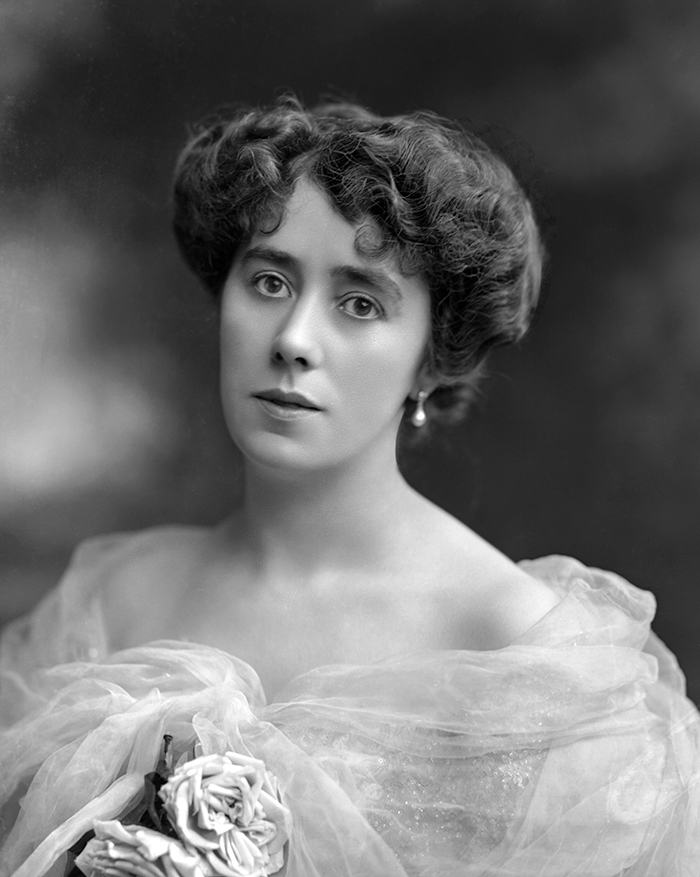
Photographed 9 May 1902 by the Lafayette Studio, London

Mary Elizabeth Harmsworth, Viscountess Northcliffe, GBE, DStJ, ARRC (née Milner; 22 December 1867 – 29 July 1963, later Lady Hudson), was the daughter of Robert Milner, of Kidlington, Oxfordshire, England.

== Marriages ==
Mary Elizabeth Milner married, firstly, Alfred Charles William Harmsworth (born 16 July 1865, Chapelizod, County Dublin, Ireland – died 14 August 1922) on 11 April 1888, at which time her married name became Harmsworth, and she was styled as Baroness Northcliffe, effective 27 December 1905. The westernmost tip of Franz Joseph Land in the Arctic was named Cape Mary Harmsworth in her honour by the Jackson–Harmsworth expedition financed by her husband. In 1911, her portrait was painted by Philip de László, and in 1914, it appeared on the cover of Country Life magazine. She was elevated to Viscountess Northcliffe on 14 January 1918. Her marriage was childless, which weighed heavily on her and her husband.

Lady Northcliffe was a member of the Joint Committee of the British Red Cross Society and Order of St John of Jerusalem during the First World War and was funder and administrator of the Lady Northcliffe Hospital for Officers. For her work in the war she was appointed Dame Grand Cross of The Most Excellent Order of the British Empire (GBE) and awarded the title Dame of Justice of the Order of St John and the decoration the Associate Royal Red Cross.

Six months after her husband's death, she married Sir Robert Arundell Hudson on 4 April 1923. He had been treasurer and financial director of the Joint War Committee.

== Death ==
Lady Hudson died in Virginia Water, Surrey, aged 95.

== Awards and honours ==
- Dame Grand Cross of the Order of the British Empire (GBE) — 1918 New Year Honours
- Registered as an Associate Royal Red Cross (ARRC) — 1919
- Dame of Grace of the Order of St. John of Jerusalem — 1919
