= Atlantification of the Arctic =

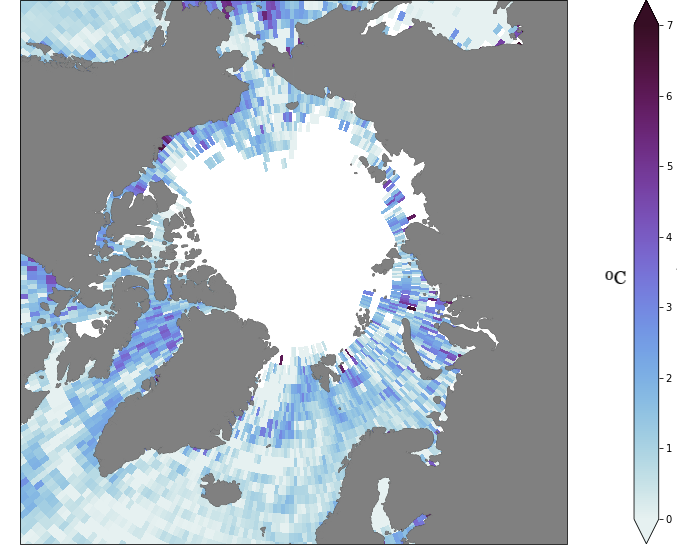
Sea surface temperature difference between the decades 1960–1970 and 2010–2020 in degrees C.

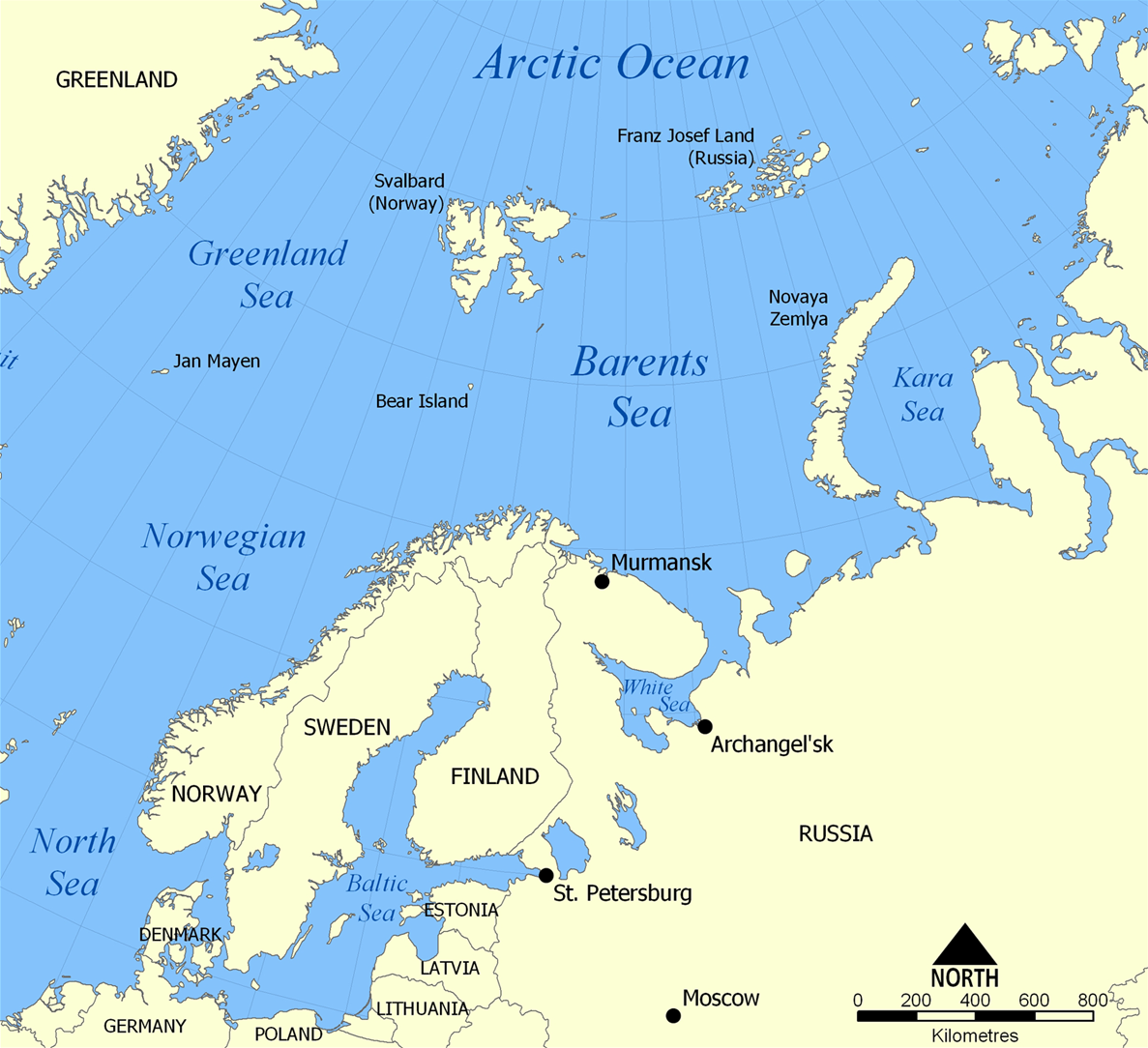
Location of the Barents Sea in the Arctic Ocean.

Atlantification is the increasing influence of Atlantic water in the Arctic. Warmer and saltier Atlantic water is extending its reach northward into the Arctic Ocean. The Arctic Ocean is becoming warmer and saltier and sea-ice is disappearing as a result. The process can be seen on the figure on the far right, where the sea surface temperature change in the past 50 years is shown, which is up to 5 degrees in some places. This change in the Arctic climate is most prominent in the Barents Sea, a shallow shelf sea north of Scandinavia, where sea-ice is disappearing faster than in any other Arctic region, impacting the local and global ecosystem.

== Structure of the Arctic Ocean ==
Temperature and salinity profiles in the Arctic Ocean. Image created by Brn-Bld.

The largest part of the Arctic Ocean has a strong division between ocean layers. At the top is a mixed layer of fresh water with a temperature near the freezing point and a salinity of around 30 psu (practical salinity unit). This water is fed by rivers and melting of sea-ice. Underneath this fresh water is a layer where the salinity increases strongly but the temperature remains low: the cold halocline layer. Below this layer, the temperature increases with depth to above the freezing point. This layer which holds this temperature gradient is called the pycnocline layer. The water underneath is warm and salty, carried in from the Atlantic Ocean by the Atlantic Meridional Overturning Circulation (AMOC). This layer is warmer than the surface layer but because of its salinity it has a higher density than the water above. This means this layer is less buoyant than the surface layer. The cold freshwater therefore floats on top and the halocline across which mixing tends to be weak even under ice free conditions and therefore protects the surface from the heat in the Atlantic water. Under the Atlantic water layer is a deep layer of Arctic bottom water extending to the bottom of the ocean.

== Process of Atlantification ==
The increasing influence of Atlantic water flowing into the Arctic Ocean and the loss of stratification causes the warm Atlantic water to mix with the fresh water at the surface. As can be seen in the figure below, the halocline weakens and therefore heat from the Atlantic water reaches the surface. This warming of the surface water causes a retreat in sea-ice in winter and a total absence of sea-ice in summer. The loss of winter sea-ice means that in summer, the colder layer of freshwater at the surface is less replenished by melting ice, lessening the temperature difference between the layers. Also, a lack of sea-ice increases the influence of wind on the sea surface, mixing the layers further.

Model predictions do not show an upward trend in volume transport into the Arctic from the North Atlantic nor an increase in the temperature of the inflowing water leading some to conclude that the Atlantification of the Arctic is not caused by a process in the Atlantic Ocean but rather by atmospheric forcing in the Arctic region, amplified by sea-ice loss.

However observations show a regime shift from winter sea ice cover to open water in the southern Barents Sea in response to the warming of the inflowing Atlantic water. Observations also reveal the increasing influence of Atlantic water heat further to the east, in the eastern Eurasian Basin, where in recent years the heat flux from the Atlantic water towards the surface has overtaken the atmospheric contribution in this region. Furthermore, an observed weakening of the halocline over this period coincided increasing wind driven upper ocean currents, pointing to increased mixing.

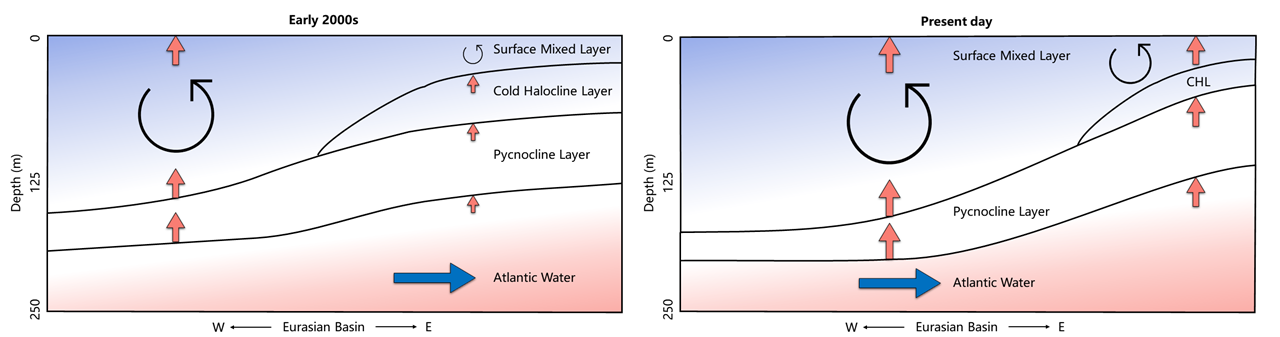
Process of Atlantification in the Eurasian Basin of the Barents Sea. Red arrows indicate heat transfer, the blue arrow indicated inflow of Atlantic water. The red and blue colors indicate warm and cold water respectively. Recreated from Polyakov et al.

== Consequences ==
At the moment, the largest part of inflowing heat from the Atlantic Ocean is lost to the atmosphere within the Barents Sea. It is expected though, that the temperature in the Barents Sea will increase due to changes in the interaction with the atmosphere. As a result, the water flowing out from the Barents Sea in between Franz Josef Land and Novaya Zemlya (Barents Sea exit) will warm significantly from -0.2$^{\circ}$ to 2.2$^{\circ}$ C in 2080. This shows that warm Atlantic water will penetrate further into the Arctic Ocean, ultimately extending throughout the Eurasian basin, leading to reduction in sea-ice thickness in this region.

=== Organisms ===
Atlantification as part of the climate changing in the Arctic has major consequences for all organisms living there. Due to the warming of Barents Sea, phytoplankton blooms are moving further into the Eurasian Basin each year. Typical species have moved 5 degrees further North compared to 1989. Also, fish communities are moving Northward at the pace of the local climate change, a process called borealization. Some predators that reach areas previously not warm enough change the ecological systems of the Arctic. As a result, Arctic shelf fish are being expelled and retract Northwards as well. For some species, depth might limit their options and this will induce changes in the biodiversity of the Arctic Ocean. This change in marine ecosystem also influences the bird and mammal species living in the Arctic region. Sea birds, seals and whales depend directly on the fish populations. Land mammals like polar bears live on seals and are also strongly dependent on the sea-ice to live on.

=== Tipping point ===
There are growing concerns that the Arctic climate might be moving to a so-called tipping point, meaning that if a critical point is reached, the system will settle around a different equilibrium state. In the Arctic this different state could be one with much less or no sea-ice.
