= Allen Young =

British Arctic explorer

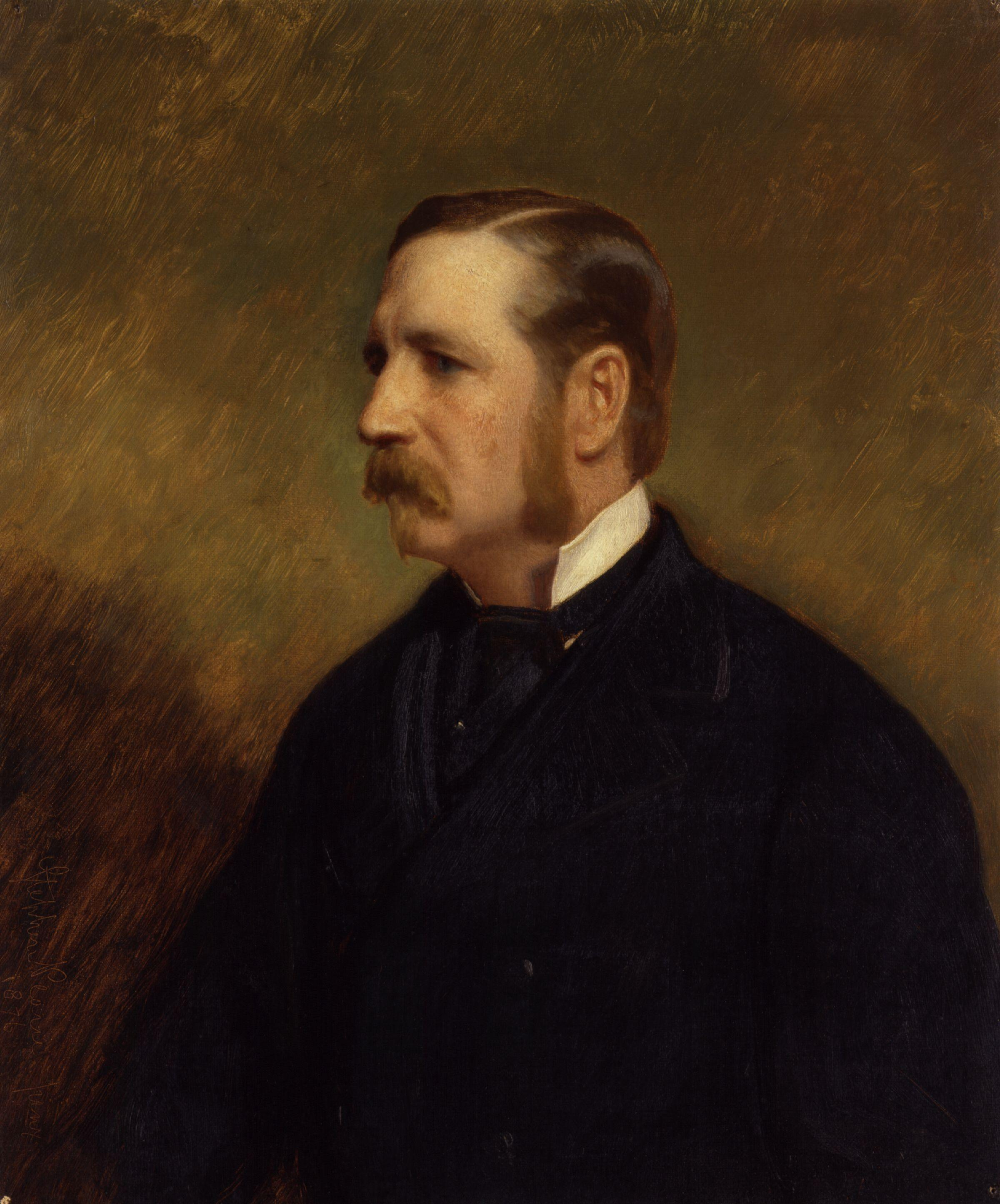
1876 portrait

Sir Allen William Young, CB, CVO (12 December 1827 – 20 November 1915) was an English master mariner and explorer, best remembered for his role in Arctic exploration including the search for Sir John Franklin.

== Early life ==
Allen Young was born at Twickenham on 12 December 1827, and went to sea as a midshipman in the merchant marine in 1842. By 1853 he was master of the Blackwall Frigate Marlborough and made two round voyages between England and Australia. During the Crimean War, he was master of the 3,000-ton troop ship Adelaide.

== The Fox Expeditions ==
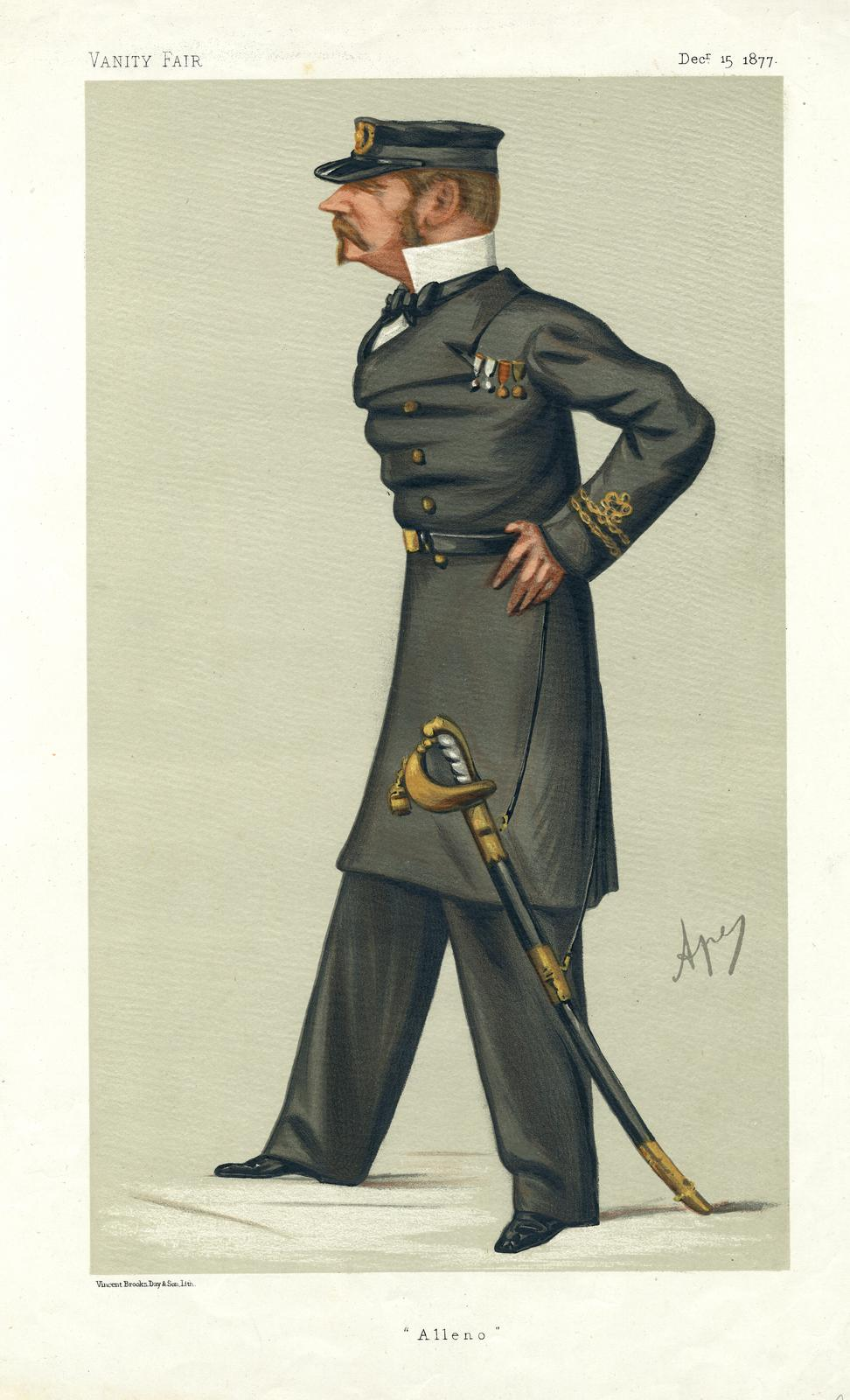
Young as caricatured by Ape (Carlo Pellegrini) in Vanity Fair, December 1877

In 1857, Allen Young offered himself as sailing master of the auxiliary steamship Fox under the overall command of Francis Leopold McClintock, that was to search the Franklin expedition, missing since 1845. He also donated 500 pounds to the expedition, and Lady Franklin gratefully accepted his services. The expedition went on to find the only written record of the missing expedition's fate, and Young himself undertook several lengthy overland sled journeys in the search.

In 1860, Allen Young was captain of Fox, as part of an expedition to determine the feasibility of carrying a telegraph line from Europe to America via the Faroe Islands, Iceland, and Greenland. Colonel Taliaferro Shaffner, who had proposed this route, Arctic explorer and physician Dr. John Rae, and senior lieutenant of the Danish Army Theodor Zeilau were in charge of surveying on land. The steamer Bulldog, commanded by McClintock, also took part. Although the expedition reported in favour of executing the plan, it never came to fruition.

== The Pandora Expeditions ==
Map of the Pandora expeditions by Allen Young

In 1874 Allen Young purchased the superseded British Royal Navy gunvessel Pandora in order to make a final search for the missing written records of the Franklin expedition, with additional funding from Lady Franklin. Innes-Lillingston was the first officer, the second officer was George Pirie and L. R. Koolemans Beynen was third officer. The expedition sailed from Southampton late in June 1875, but heavy ice in Peel Sound prevented the vessel from reaching the search area, and the expedition returned unsuccessful. By this time Lady Franklin had died. In 1876 Allen Young took the Pandora on a second voyage to the Arctic with stores to relieve the British Arctic Expedition. Young was knighted in recognition of his services.

Sir Allen Young planned another expedition in Pandora in 1878, but was induced by a sponsor James Gordon Bennett, Jr. to sell the vessel to him. She was renamed Jeannette for a United States Arctic expedition, and subsequently wrecked with heavy loss of life.

== Leigh Smith Relief Expedition ==
In 1881 Sir Allen Young was commissioned to take the steamship Hope in search of Benjamin Leigh Smith's expedition missing in Franz Josef Land, north of Russia. He successfully located the expeditioners early in August, to learn that their vessel Eira had been crushed by ice and sunk on 21 August 1881.

== Later Ventures ==
In 1885 Sir Allen Young was master of the hospital ship Stella supporting British military actions in the Soudan.

During 1886-87 Sir Allen Young proposed and lobbied for leadership of a British Antarctic Expedition, but adequate financial support failed to materialise.

== Royal friendship ==
Sir Allen Young was a friend of the Prince of Wales, subsequently King Edward VII of the United Kingdom. He is remembered for a dinner party he held in London on 24 May 1877 at which he arranged for the Prince to sit next to his mistress Lillie Langtry while her husband was discreetly seated elsewhere. Keeping his friendship after the Prince acceded as King, Young is listed as visiting Sandringham House in early 1903.
