= Barents Sea =

Marginal sea of the Arctic Ocean

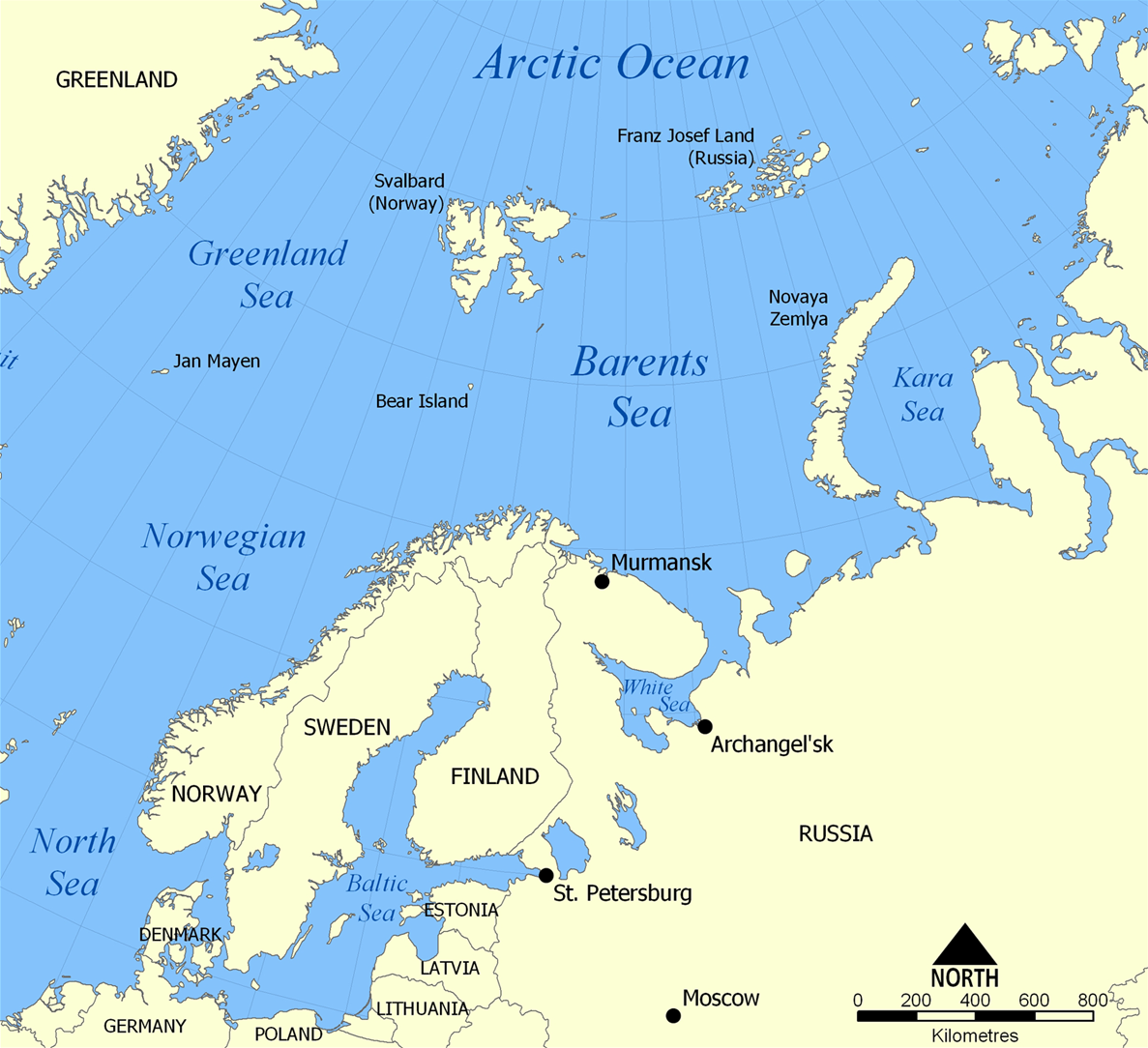
- Location of the Barents Sea
- Interactive map of Barents Sea
- Location: Arctic Ocean
- Coordinates: 75°N 40°E
- Type: Sea
- Primary inflows: Norwegian Sea, Arctic Ocean
- Basin countries: Norway and Russia
- Surface area: 1,400,000 km^{2} (540,000 sq mi)
- Average depth: 230 m (750 ft)
- References: Institute of Marine Research, Norway

The Barents Sea (Note: /ˈbærənts/ BARR-ənts, also US: /ˈbɑːrənts/ BAR-ənts; Norwegian: Barentshavet, Urban East Norwegian: [ˈbɑ̀ːrəntsˌhɑːvə]; Russian: Баренцево море, romanized: Barentsevo more.) is a marginal sea of the Arctic Ocean, located off the northern coasts of Norway and Russia and divided between Norwegian and Russian territorial waters.

The Barents Sea is a rather shallow shelf sea with an average depth of 230 metres (750 ft), and it is an important site for both fishing and hydrocarbon exploration. It is bordered by the Kola Peninsula to the south, the shelf edge towards the Norwegian Sea to the west, the archipelagos of Svalbard to the northwest, Franz Josef Land to the northeast and Novaya Zemlya to the east. The islands of Novaya Zemlya, an extension of the northern end of the Ural Mountains, separate the Barents Sea from the Kara Sea.

Although part of the Arctic Ocean, the Barents Sea has been characterised as "turning into the Atlantic", or in the process of being "Atlantified", because of its status as "the Arctic warming hot spot". Hydrologic changes due to global warming have led to a reduction in sea ice and in the stratification of the water column, which could produce major changes in weather in Eurasia. One prediction is that, as the Barents Sea's permanent ice-free area grows, evaporation will increase, leading to increased winter snowfalls in much of continental Europe.

== Geography ==
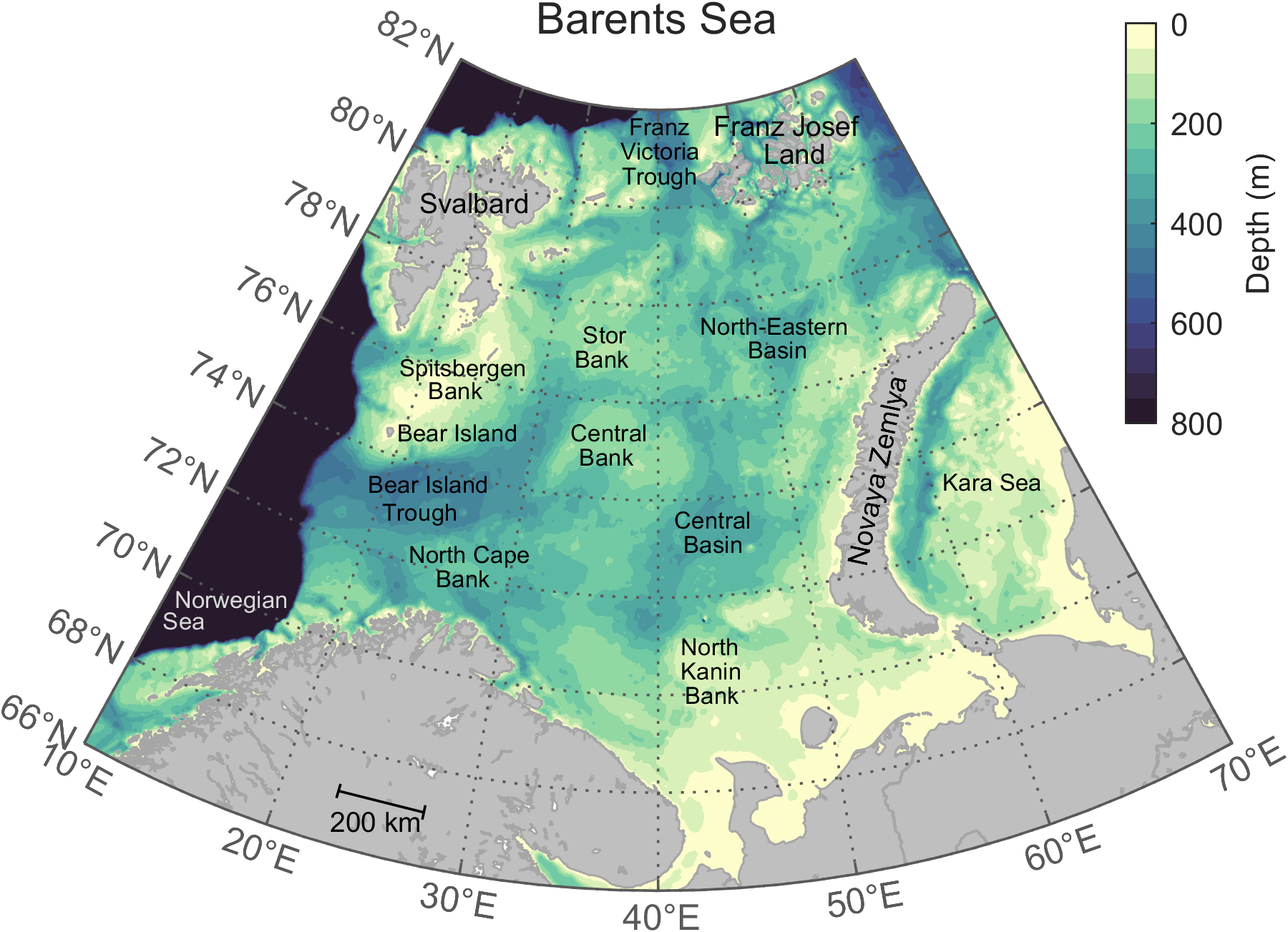
Bathymetric map of the Barents Sea showing major submarine features

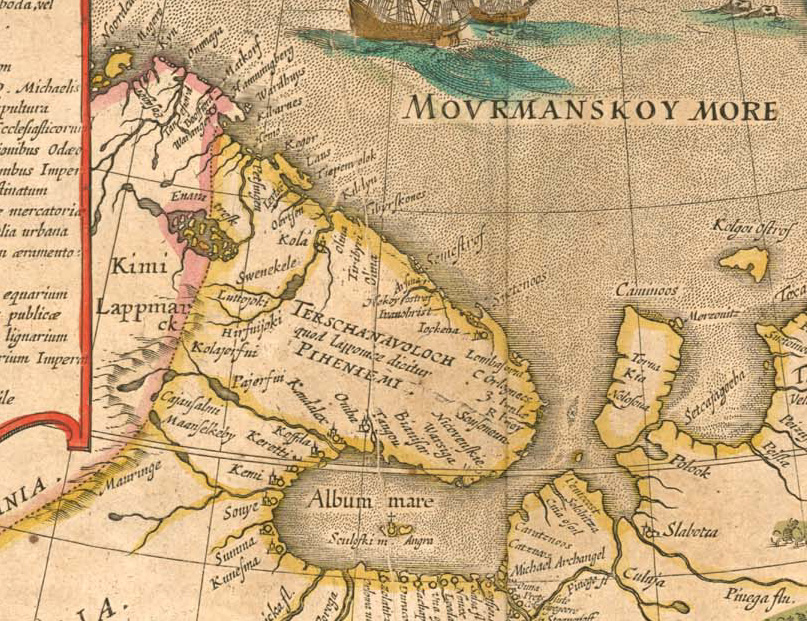
Shores of the Barents (Murman) Sea. From "Tabula Russiae", Joan Blaeu's, Amsterdam, 1614.

The southern half of the Barents Sea, including the ports of Murmansk (Russia) and Vardø (Norway) remain ice-free year-round due to the warm North Atlantic drift. In September, the entire Barents Sea is more or less completely ice-free. From 1920 to 1944, Finland's territory also reached the Barents Sea. The Liinakhamari harbour in the Pechengsky District was Finland's only ice-free winter harbour until 1944 when it was ceded to the Soviet Union.

There are three main types of water masses in the Barents Sea: Warm, salty Atlantic water (temperature >3 °C, salinity >35) from the North Atlantic drift; cold Arctic water (temperature <0 °C, salinity <35) from the north; and warm, but not very salty, coastal water (temperature >3 °C, salinity <34.7). Between the Atlantic and Polar waters, a front called the Polar Front is formed. In the western parts of the sea (close to Bear Island), this front is determined by the bottom topography and is therefore relatively sharp and stable from year to year, while in the east (towards Novaya Zemlya), it can be quite diffuse and its position can vary markedly between years.

The lands of Novaya Zemlya attained most of their early Holocene coastal deglaciation approximately 10,000 years before the present.

=== Extent ===
The International Hydrographic Organization defines the limits of the "Barentsz Sea" [sic] as follows:

On the west: The northeastern limit of the Norwegian Sea [A line joining the southernmost point of West Spitzbergen [sic] to North Cape of Bear Island, through this island to Cape Bull and thence on to North Cape in Norway (25°45'E)].

On the northwest: The eastern shore of West Spitzbergen [sic], Hinlopen Strait up to 80° latitude north; south and east coasts of North-East Land [the island of Nordaustlandet] to Cape Leigh Smith (80°05′N 28°00′E).

On the north: Cape Leigh Smith across the Islands Bolshoy Ostrov (Great Island) [Storøya], Gilles [Kvitøya] and Victoria; Cape Mary Harmsworth (southwestern extremity of Alexandra Land) along the northern coasts of Franz-Josef Land as far as Cape Kohlsaat (81°14′N 65°10′E).

On the east: Cape Kohlsaat to Cape Zhelaniya (Desire); west and southwest coast of Novaya Zemlya to Cape Kussov Noss and thence to western entrance Cape, Dolgaya Bay (70°15′N 58°25′E) on Vaigach Island. Through Vaigach Island to Cape Greben; thence to Cape Belyi Noss on the mainland.

On the south: The northern limit of the White Sea [A line joining Svyatoi Nos (Murmansk Coast, 39°47'E) and Cape Kanin].

Other islands in the Barents Sea include Chaichy and Timanets.

=== Geology ===
The Barents Sea was originally formed from two major continental collisions: the Caledonian orogeny, in which the Baltica and Laurentia collided to form Laurasia, and a subsequent collision between Laurasia and Western Siberia. Most of its geological history is dominated by extensional tectonics, caused by the collapse of the Caledonian and Uralian orogenic belts and the break-up of Pangaea. These events created the major rift basins that dominate the Barents Shelf, along with various platforms and structural highs. The later geological history of the Barents Sea is dominated by Late Cenozoic uplift, particularly that caused by Quaternary glaciation, which has resulted in erosion and deposition of significant sediment.

=== Ecology ===
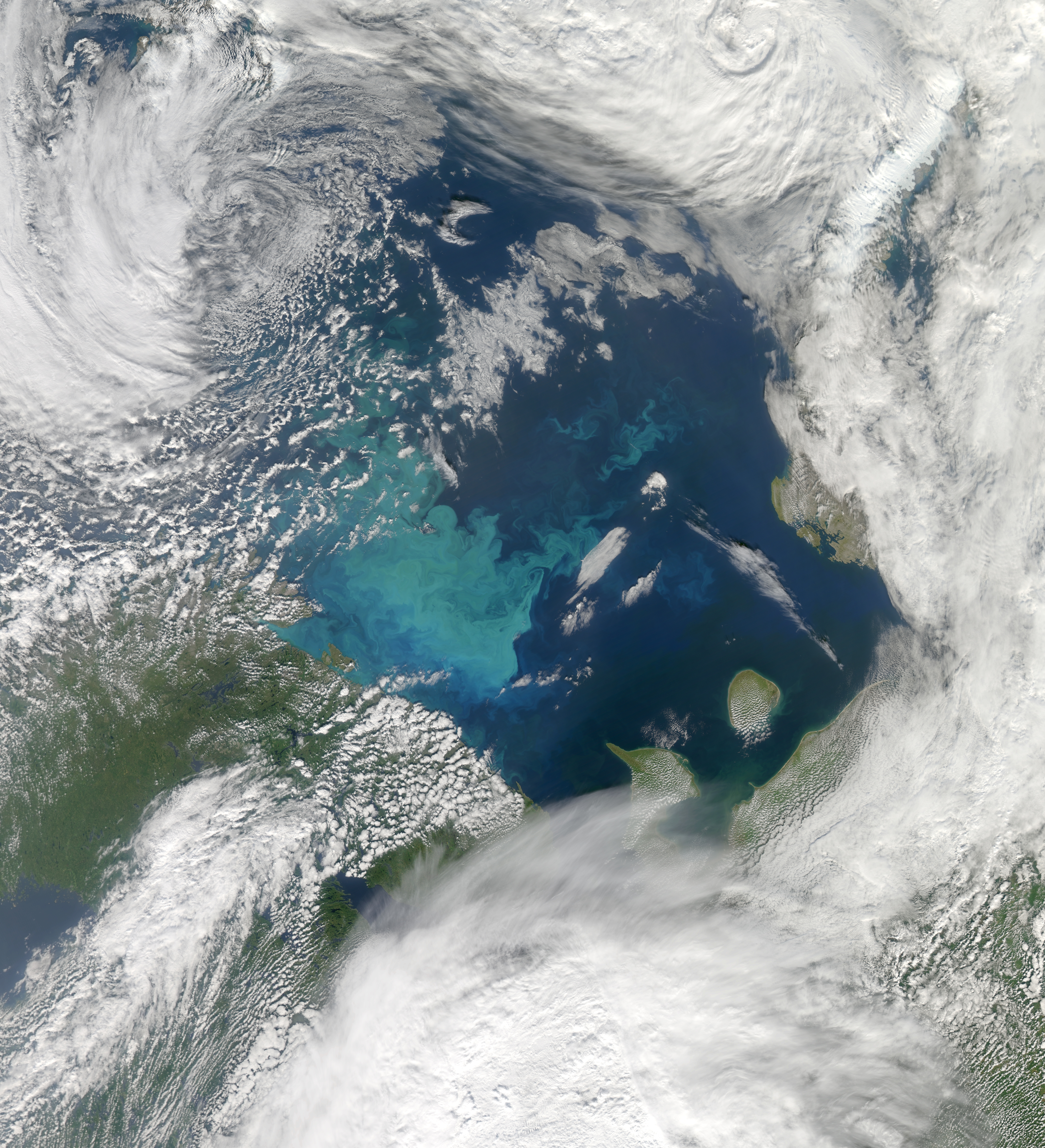
Phytoplankton bloom in the Barents Sea. The milky-blue colour that dominates the bloom suggests that it contains large numbers of coccolithophores.

Due to the North Atlantic drift, the Barents Sea has a high biological production compared to other oceans of similar latitude. The spring bloom of phytoplankton can start quite early near the ice edge because the fresh water from the melting ice makes up a stable water layer on top of the seawater. The phytoplankton bloom feeds zooplankton such as Calanus finmarchicus, Calanus glacialis, Calanus hyperboreus, Oithona spp., and krill. The zooplankton feeders include young cod, capelin, polar cod, whales, and little auk. The capelin is a key food for top predators such as the north-east Arctic cod, harp seals, and seabirds such as the common guillemot and Brunnich's guillemot. The fisheries of the Barents Sea, in particular the cod fisheries, are of great importance for both Norway and Russia.

SIZEX-89 was an international winter experiment in 1989 for which the main objectives were to perform sensor signature studies of different ice types to develop SAR algorithms for ice variables, such as ice types, ice concentrations and ice kinematics. Although previous research suggested that predation by whales may be the cause of depleting fish stocks, more recent research suggests that marine mammal consumption has only a trivial influence on fisheries. A model assessing the effects of fisheries and climate was far more accurate at describing trends in fish abundance. There is a genetically distinct polar bear population associated with the Barents Sea.

=== Pollution ===
The Barents Sea is "among the most polluted places on Earth" due to accumulated marine garbage, decades of Soviet nuclear tests, radioactive waste dumping and industrial pollution. The elevated pollution has caused elevated rates of disease among locals. With rising military buildup and increased use of shipping lanes heading east through the Arctic, there are concerns that a further increase in pollution is likely, not least from the increased risk of future oil spills from ships not properly equipped for the environment.

=== Connections to global weather ===
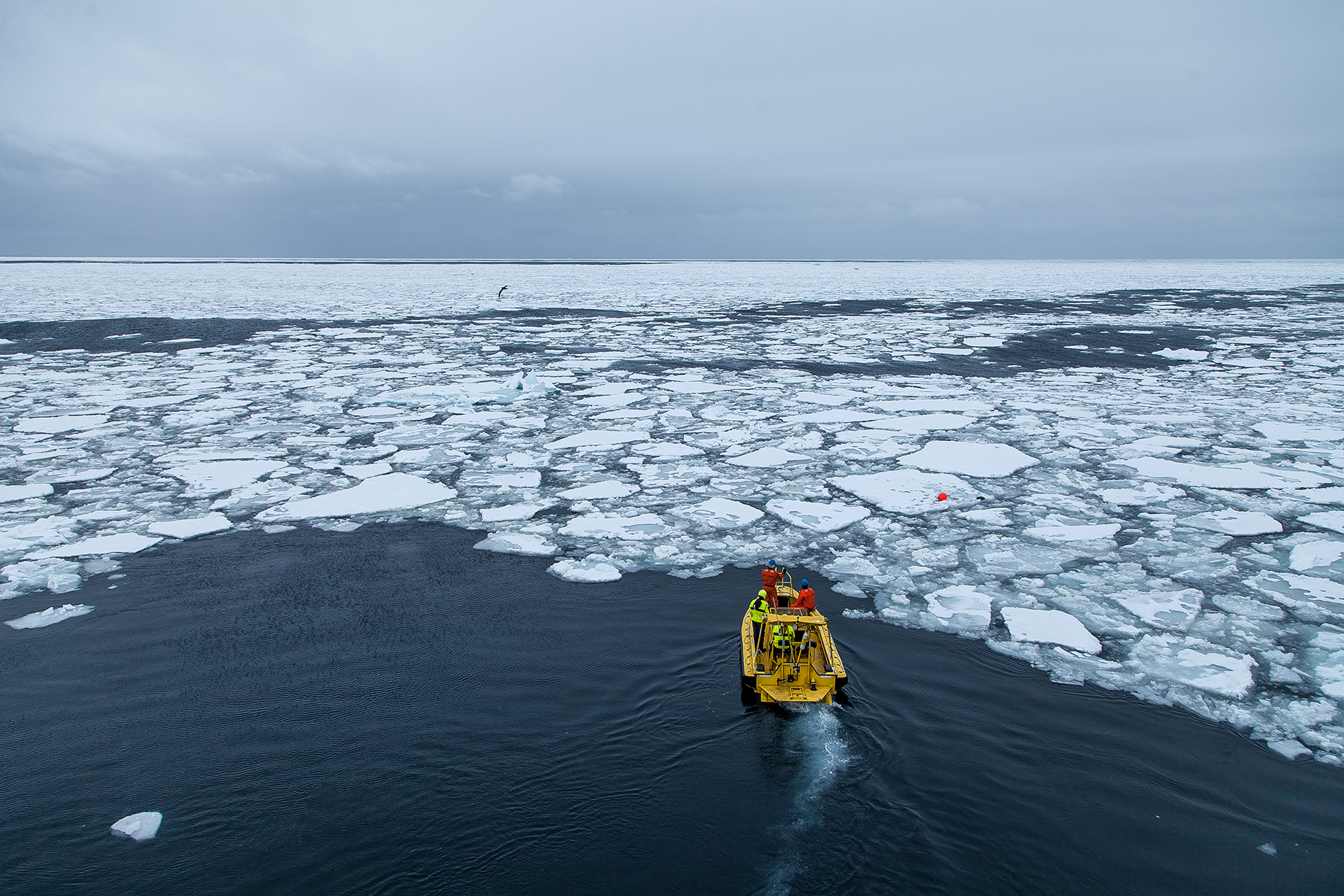
Fragmented sea ice within the Barents Sea marginal ice zone southeast of Svalbard, 5 May 2016

The Barents Sea is the fastest-warming part of the Arctic, and some assessments now treat Barents sea ice as a separate tipping point from the rest of the Arctic sea ice, suggesting that it could permanently disappear once the global warming exceeds 1.5 degrees. This rapid warming also makes it easier to detect any potential connections between the state of sea ice and weather conditions elsewhere than in any other area. The first study proposing a connection between floating ice decline in the Barents Sea and the neighbouring Kara Sea and more intense winters in Europe was published in 2010, and there has been extensive research into this subject since then. For instance, a 2019 paper holds BKS ice decline responsible for 44% of the 1995–2014 central Eurasian cooling trend, far more than indicated by the models, while another study from that year suggests that the decline in BKS ice reduces snow cover in the North Eurasia but increases it in central Europe. There are also potential links to summer precipitation: a connection has been proposed between the reduced BKS ice extent in November–December and greater June rainfall over South China. One paper even identified a connection between Kara Sea ice extent and the ice cover of Lake Qinghai on the Tibetan Plateau.

However, BKS ice research is often subject to the same uncertainty as the broader research into Arctic amplification/whole-Arctic sea ice loss and the jet stream, and is often challenged by the same data. Nevertheless, the most recent research still finds connections which are statistically robust, yet non-linear in nature: two separate studies published in 2021 indicate that while autumn BKS ice loss results in cooler Eurasian winters, ice loss during winter makes Eurasian winters warmer: as BKS ice loss accelerates, the risk of more severe Eurasian winter extremes diminishes while heatwave risk in the spring and summer is magnified.

== History ==
=== Name ===
Historically, early Russian seafarers and cartographers referred to it as the "Siverskoye more" (lit. 'Siver Sea', after the north wind) or the Studenoye or Ledovitoye sea (lit. 'Frozen Sea'). It also appeared under localized names such as Pechorskoye more (Pechora Sea) near the Pechora River's estuary, Pomorskoye more (after the Pomors), as well as Russkoye more (lit. 'Russian Sea') or Moskovskoye more (lit. 'Moscow Sea'). It was labeled as Murmanskoye more (lit. 'Murman Sea') on some 16th-century maps, including Gerard Mercator's 1595 Map of the Arctic.

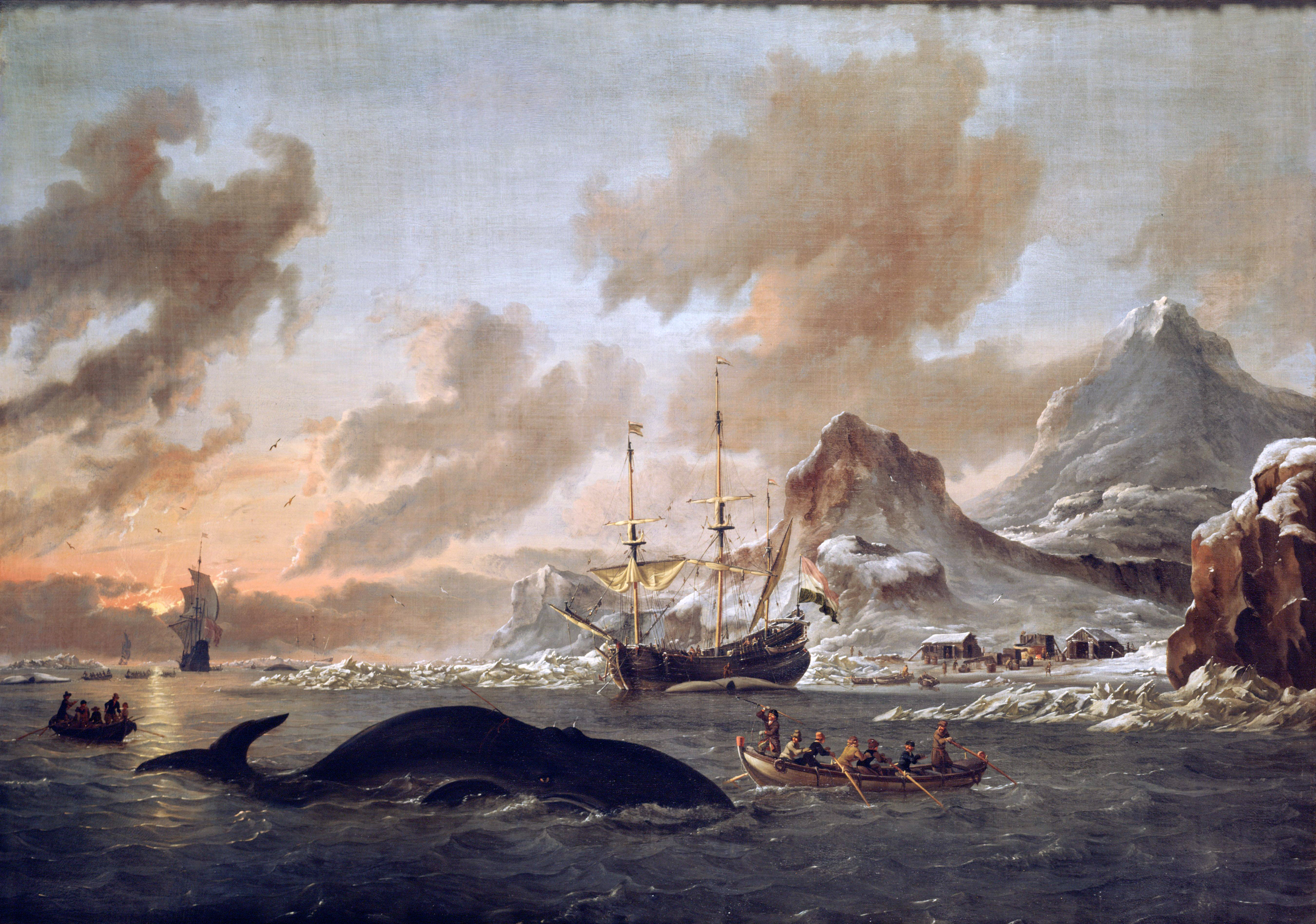
Dutch whalers near Svalbard, 1690

This sea was given its present name by the cartographer August Petermann in honour of Willem Barentsz, a Dutch navigator and explorer. Barentsz was the leader of early expeditions to the far north, at the end of the 16th century.

The Barents Sea has been called by sailors The Devil's Dance Floor due to its unpredictability and difficulty level.

Ocean rowers call it "Devil's Jaw". In 2017, after the first recorded complete man-powered crossing of the Barents Sea from Tromsø to Longyearbyen in a rowboat by the Polar Row expedition, captain Fiann Paul was asked by Norwegian TV2 how a rower would name the Barents Sea. Fiann responded that he would name it "Devil's Jaw", adding that the winds you constantly battle are like breath from the devil's nostrils while he holds you in his jaws.

=== Modern era ===
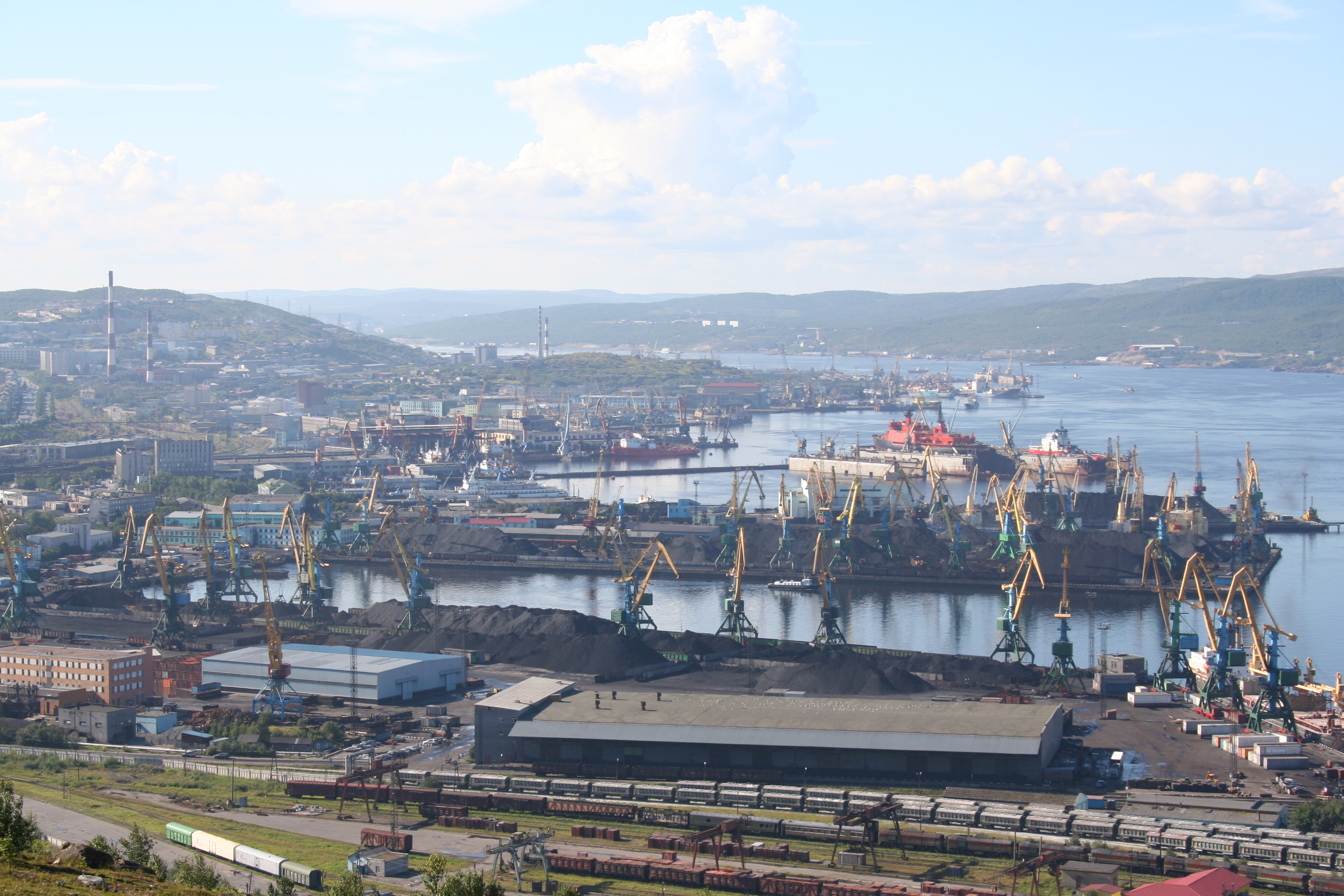
The harbour of the Murmansk Fjord

Seabed mapping was completed in 1933; the first full map was produced by Russian marine geologist Maria Klenova.

The Barents Sea was the site of a notable World War II engagement which later became known as the Battle of the Barents Sea. Under the command of Oskar Kummetz, German warships sank minelayer HMS Bramble and destroyer HMS Achates but lost destroyer Z16 Friedrich Eckoldt. Also, the German cruiser Admiral Hipper was severely damaged by British gunfire. The Germans later retreated and the British convoy arrived safely at Murmansk shortly afterwards.

During the Cold War, the Soviet Red Banner Northern Fleet used the southern reaches of the sea as a ballistic missile submarine bastion, a strategy that Russia continued. Nuclear contamination from dumped Russian naval reactors is an environmental concern in the Barents Sea.

== Economy ==
=== Political status ===
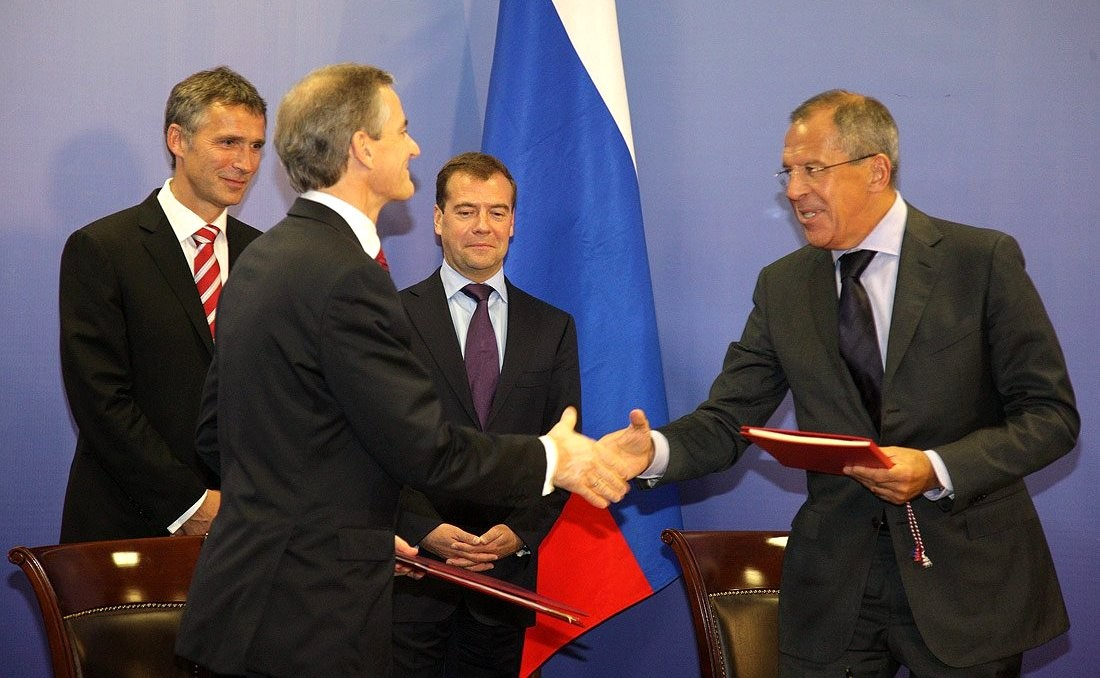
Signing of the Russian–Norwegian Treaty, 15 September 2010

For decades there was a boundary dispute between Norway and Russia regarding the position of the boundary between their respective claims to the Barents Sea. The Norwegians favoured a median line, based on the Geneva Convention of 1958, whereas the Russians favoured a meridian-based sector line, based on a Soviet decision of 1926. A neutral "grey" zone between the competing claims had an area of 175,000 square kilometres (68,000 sq mi), which is approximately 12% of the total area of the Barents Sea. The two countries started negotiations on the location of the boundary in 1974 and agreed to a moratorium on hydrocarbon exploration in 1976.

Twenty years after the fall of the Soviet Union, in 2010 Norway and Russia signed an agreement that placed the boundary equidistant from their competing claims. This was ratified and went into force on 7 July 2011, opening the grey zone for hydrocarbon exploration.

=== Oil and gas ===
Encouraged by the success of oil exploration and production in the North Sea in the 1960s, Norway began hydrocarbon exploration in the Barents Sea in 1969. They acquired seismic reflection surveys through the following years, which were analysed to understand the location of the main sedimentary basins. NorskHydro drilled the first well in 1980, which was a dry hole, and the first discoveries were made the following year: the Alke and Askeladden gas fields. Several more discoveries were made on the Norwegian side of the Barents Sea throughout the 1980s, including the important Snøhvit field.

However, interest in the area began to wane due to a succession of dry holes, wells containing only gas (which was cheap at the time), and the prohibitive costs of developing wells in such a remote area. Interest in the area was reignited in the late 2000s after the Snovhit field was finally brought into production and two new large discoveries were made.

The Russians began exploration in their territory around the same time, encouraged by their success in the Timan-Pechora Basin. They drilled their first wells in the early 1980s, and some very large gas fields were discovered throughout this decade. The Shtokman field was discovered in 1988 and is classed as a giant gas field: currently the 5th-largest gas field in the world. Similar practical difficulties Barents Sea resulted in a decline in Russian exploration, aggravated by the nation's political instability of the 1990s.

=== Fishing ===
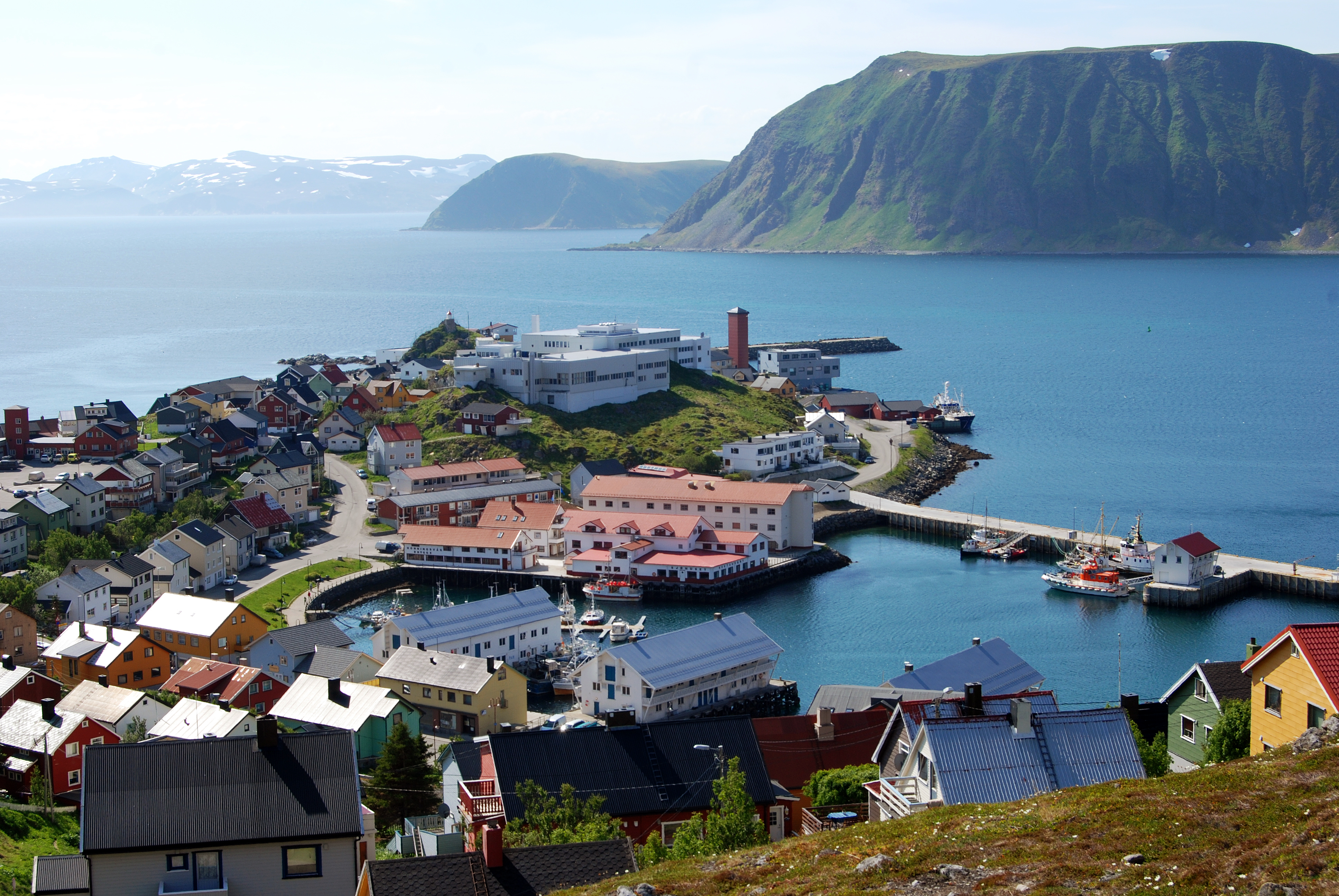
Honningsvåg is the most northerly fishing village in Norway

The Barents Sea contains the world's largest remaining cod population, as well as important stocks of haddock and capelin. Fishing is managed jointly by Russia and Norway in the form of the Joint Norwegian–Russian Fisheries Commission, established in 1976, in an attempt to keep track of how many fish are leaving the ecosystem due to fishing. The Joint Norwegian-Russian Fisheries Commission sets Total Allowable Catches (TACs) for multiple species throughout their migratory tracks. Through the Commission, Norway and Russia also exchange fishing quotas and catch statistics to ensure the TACs are not being violated.

However there are problems with reporting under this system, and researchers believe that they do not have accurate data for the effects of fishing on the Barents Sea ecosystem. Cod is one of the major catches. A large portion of catches are not reported when the fishing boats land, to account for profits that are being lost to high taxes and fees. Since many fishermen do not strictly follow the TACs and rules set forth by the Commission, the amount of fish being extracted annually from the Barents Sea is underestimated.

=== Barents Sea biodiversity and marine bioprospecting ===
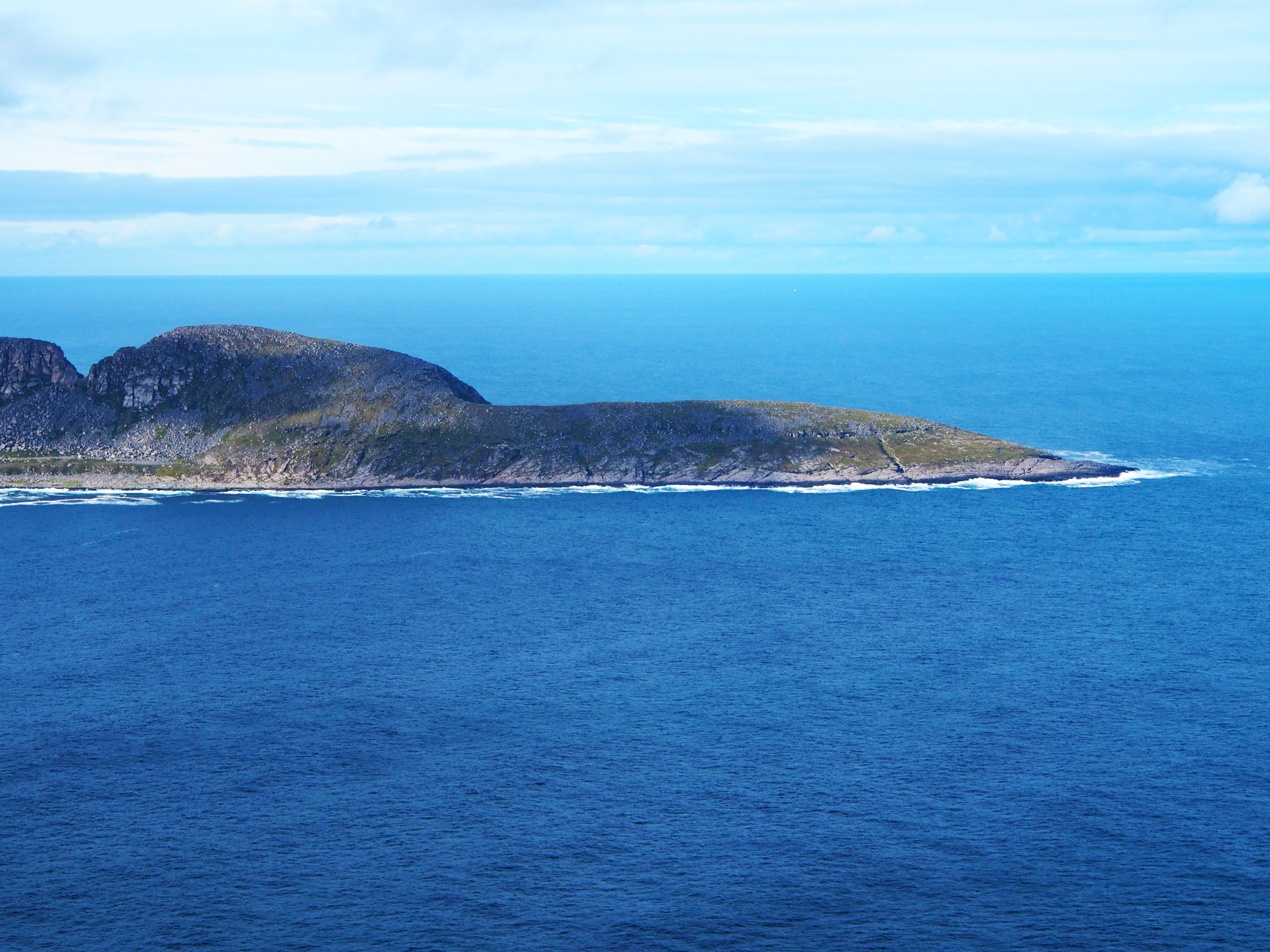
Nordkapp on the Barents Sea

The Barents Sea, where temperate waters from the Gulf Stream and cold waters from the Arctic meet, is home to an enormous diversity of organisms, which are well-adapted to the extreme conditions of their marine habitats. This makes these arctic species very attractive for marine bioprospecting. Marine bioprospecting may be defined as the search for bioactive molecules and compounds from marine sources that have new, unique properties and the potential for commercial applications. Amongst others, applications include medicines, food and feed, textiles, cosmetics and the process industry.

The Norwegian government strategically supports the development of marine bioprospecting as it has the potential to contribute to new and sustainable wealth creation. Tromsø and the northern areas of Norway play a central role in this strategy. They have excellent access to unique Arctic marine organisms, existing marine industries, and R&D competence and infrastructure in this region. Since 2007, science and industry have cooperated closely on bioprospecting and the development and commercialization of new products.

== See also ==
- Barents Basin
- Continental shelf of Russia
- Energy in Norway
- List of largest biotechnology & pharmaceutical companies
- List of oil and gas fields of the Barents Sea
- List of seas

== Sources ==
- Ole Gunnar Austvik (2006) Oil and gas in the High North, Security Policy Library no. 4, The Norwegian Atlantic Committee. ISSN 0802-6602.
- C. Michael Hogan (2008) Polar Bear: Ursus maritimus, Globaltwitcher.com, ed. Nicklas Stromberg.
- World Wildlife Fund (2008). Barents Sea environment and conservation.
- Zeeberg, JaapJan; David J. Lubinski; Steven L. Forman (September 2001). "Holocene Relative Sea Level History of Novaya Zemlya, Russia and Implications for Late Weichselian Ice-Sheet Loading" (PDF). Quaternary Research. 56 (2). Quaternary Research Center/Elsevier Science: 218–230. Bibcode:2001QuRes..56..218Z. doi:10.1006/qres.2001.2256. ISSN 0033-5894. S2CID 58938344.
