= Brochøya =

Norwegian island

- Brochøya is located north of Nordaustlandet.

Geography
- Location: Nordaustlandet, Svalbard, Norway
- Coordinates: 80°27.2′N 25°58.9′E
- Archipelago: Svalbard

Administration
- Norway

Brochøya is an island off the north coast of Nordaustlandet, Svalbard. The island is named after politician and physicist Ole Jacob Broch.

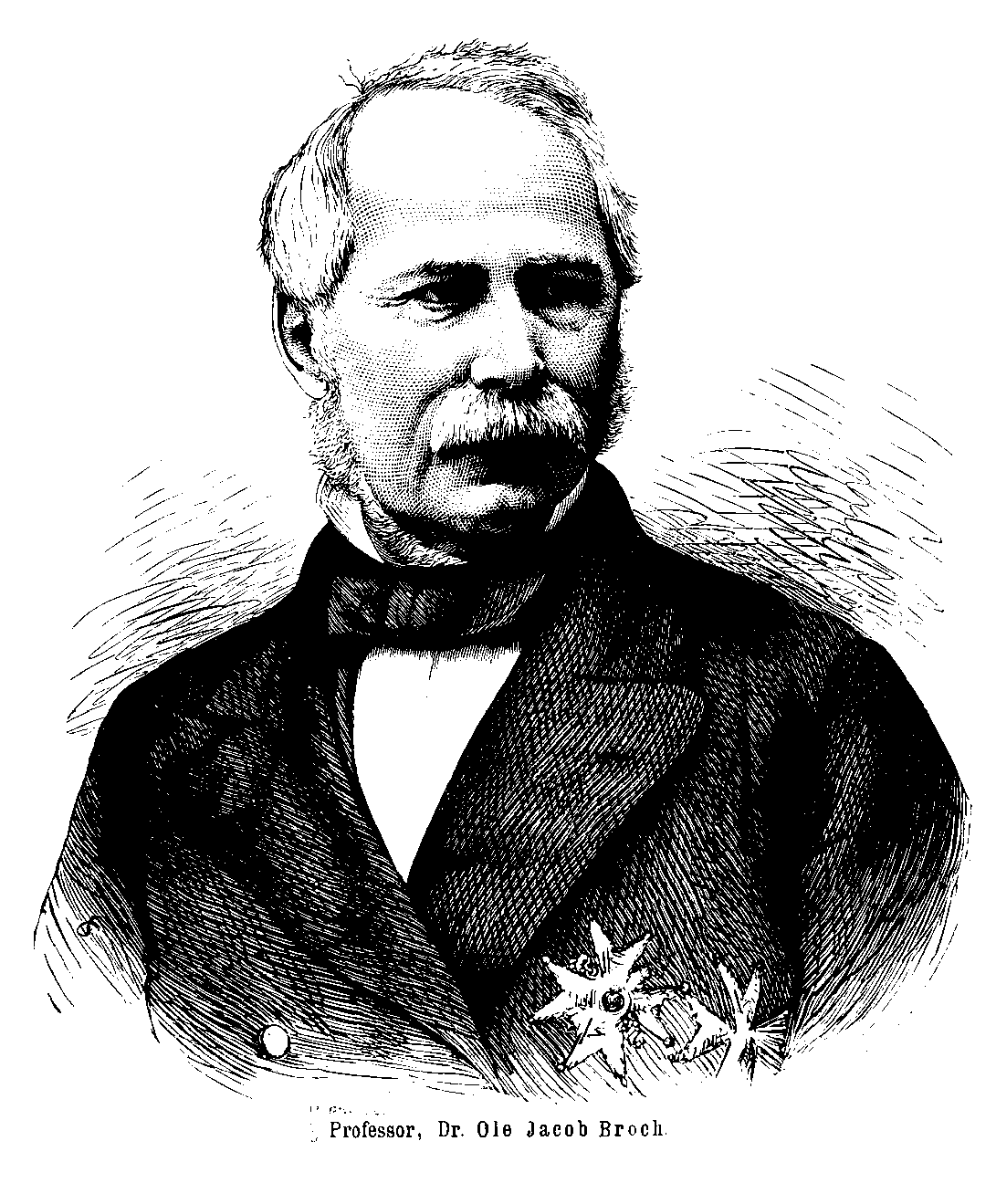
Brochøya is named after Ole Jacob Broch.

Brochøya is located west of Foynøya, is part of Orvin Land and is included in the Nordaust-Svalbard Nature Reserve.
