= Cape Mary Harmsworth =

Cape located in Alexandra Land, Russia

Coordinates: 80°35′58″N 44°54′45″E

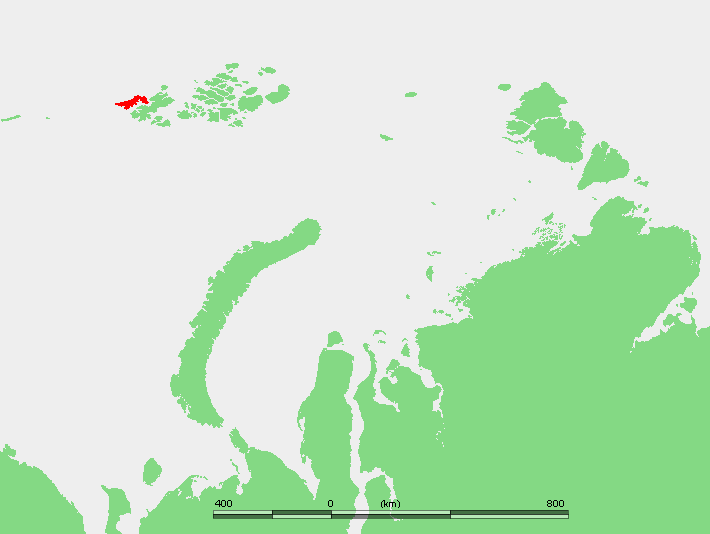
Location of Alexandra Land in the Franz Josef Archipelago. Cape Mary Harmsworth is located on its western end.

Cape Mary Harmsworth (Russian: Мыс Мэри-Хармсуорт; Mys Meri Kharmsuort) is a cape located in Alexandra Land (Russian Federation).

This cape is the westernmost part of the Franz Josef Archipelago proper, not counting far-lying Victoria Island which is geographically detached from the group.

The cape was named after Mary Harmsworth (later Viscountess Northcliffe). Her husband Alfred Harmsworth, fellow of the Royal Geographical Society, was the main sponsor of the 1894 Jackson–Harmsworth expedition to Franz Joseph Land.

This is the place that Russian navigator Valerian Albanov of the Svyataya Anna reached in 1914 after his long ordeal on the Polar ice.
