= Foynøya =

Island in Svalbard, Norway

Coordinates: 80°26′54″N 26°09′18″E

- Foynøya (Svalbard)
- Interactive map of Foynøya

Geography
- Location: Arctic
- Archipelago: Svalbard

Administration
- Norway

Demographics
- Population: 0 (uninhabited)

Foynøya is an island off the coast of Nordaustlandet, Svalbard. Sources give the size as about 1.5 km^{2} (0.58 sq mi) or about 2 km^{2} (0.77 sq mi). The island is named after whaling pioneer Svend Foyn. Previous names include Walrus Eyland, Föyen's Island and Foyn Island.

The island is part of the Nordaust-Svalbard Nature Reserve.

== History ==
Cornelis Giles went on an expedition in the Arctic in 1707 because that year there was a warm season. He passed by several islands, including the Seven Islands, Kvitøya, and other minor islands. One of those islands had a massive walrus colony on it, and thus he gave it the name “Walrus Eyland”. When he returned to the Netherlands, he and Outger Rep created a map based on Giles' navigational logs and shore descriptions..

The island was later rediscovered in Benjamin Leigh Smith's 1871 Svalbard Expedition, during which he was sailing on the Sampson. This later led to the area being frequented by Norwegian whalers like Svend Foyn.

In May 1928, the airship Italia broke down on its way back from the North Pole. Umberto Nobile and eight of his companions remained on the drifting ice. When they were discovered from the plane on June 20, they were a few kilometers northeast of Foynøya. Two members of a rescue expedition, the Italian captain Gennaro Sora (1892–1949) and his Dutch dog sledder Sjef van Dongen (1906–1973), were stranded on the island in July 1928. They had set off from the North Cape of the island of Chermsideøya on 18 June and advanced via Scorsbyøya, Cape Platen and Cape Bruun to Foynøya, where they had arrived on 4 July. Here they had run out of provisions and dog food, so that they themselves were in need. [4] On the morning of July 12, 1928, they were discovered by the Soviet icebreaker Krasin and picked up by two Swedish seaplanes in the evening. [5] The international rescue operation was later described in the radio play SOS ... Rao Rao ... Foyn, whose title also includes the name of the island of Foynøya.
