= Hooker Island =

Central islands of Franz Josef Land

остров Гукера
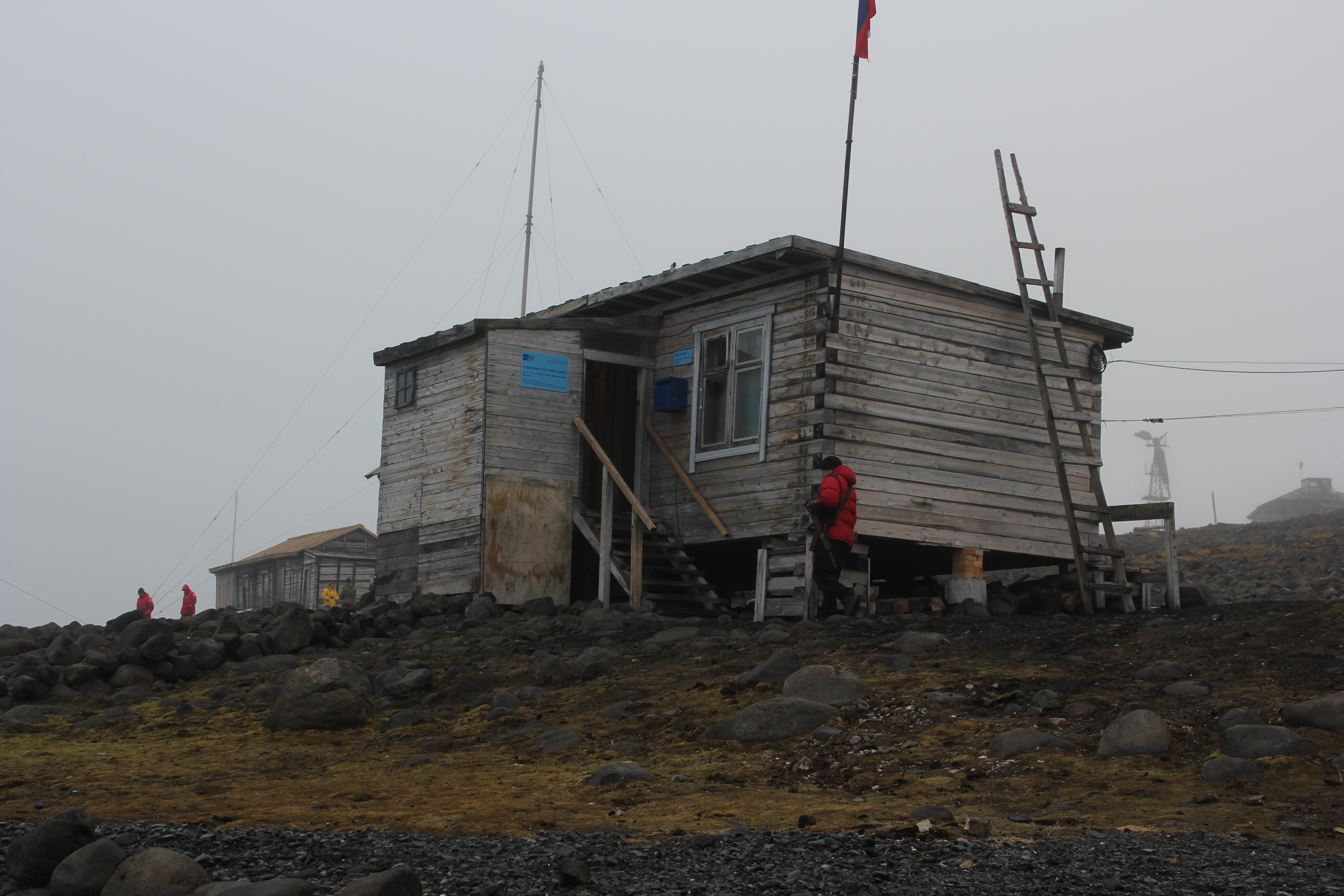
- Post Office. Tikhaya Bay

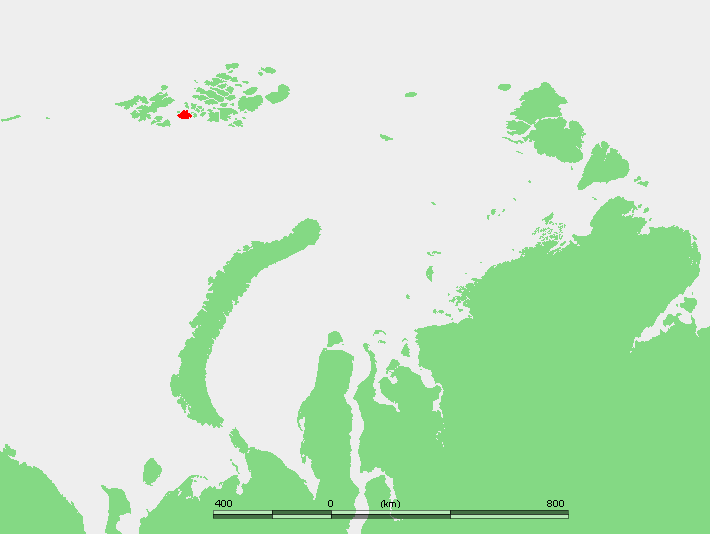
- Location of Hooker Island in Franz Josef Land

Geography
- Location: Arctic
- Coordinates: 80°14′N 53°02′E
- Archipelago: Franz Josef Archipelago
- Area: 459.8 km^{2} (177.5 sq mi)
- Length: 32.8 km (20.38 mi)
- Width: 29.9 km (18.58 mi)
- Highest elevation: 576 m (1890 ft)
- Highest point: Kupol Dzhensona

Administration
- Russian Federation

Demographics
- Population: 0

Southern islands of Franz Josef Land

Hooker Island (Russian: остров Гукера; Ostrov Gukera) is one of the central islands of Franz Josef Land. It is located in the central area of the archipelago at 80.23°N 53.02°E. It is administered by the Arkhangelsk Oblast, Russia.

== History ==
Hooker Island was discovered by the 1880 expedition to Franz Josef Land led by Benjamin Leigh Smith. It was named after British naturalist Sir Joseph Dalton Hooker who went with James Clark Ross' expedition on ships Erebus and Terror to Antarctica in 1839.

Remains of a plesiosaur (putatively likened to Peloneustes philarchus) have been found in Hooker Island. Caribou antlers have been found as well, suggesting that herds reached here up to about 1,300 years ago during a period where the earth had a warmer climate.

Tikhaya Bay was the site of a major base for polar expeditions, and the location of a meteorological station from 1929 to 1963. There is another bay in the south of the island called Zaliv Makarova and another in the east known as Ledn. Eleniy.

The island was visited by the Graf Zeppelin airship in July 1931 during a landmark aerial survey. German staff were marooned here from 1941 to 1945 during World War II. A graveyard and two modern buildings exist.

== Geography ==
The highest point in Hooker Island is the summit of the western ice dome, Kupol Dzhensona (Купол Дженсона), at 576 metres (1,890 feet). There is another ice dome further north Kupol Yuriya (Купол Юрия), as well as a glacier with its terminus in the southern shore, the Obruchev Glacier. To the southwest, De Bruyne Sound separates the island from Northbrook Island. To the north, the Young Sound separates Hooker Island from the islands of Koetlitz, Nansen, Pritchet, and several others.

Hooker Island's northwestern cape, Mys Alberta Markgama, is named after Sir Albert Hastings Markham; the northeastern cape is called Mys Lyuis Pul. The westernmost cape is Mys Dandy and the southwestern one is Mys Ugol'nyy. The southernmost cape is called Mys Sesil Kharmswort.

On Hooker Island's western side there is a bay in an unglaciated area, Tikhaya Bay (Бухта Тихая, 80°20′N 52°47′E). A large seabird colony exists near Tikhaya Bay at Skala Rubini (Скала Рубини, Rubini Rock, 80°18′N 52°50′E), a spectacular rock formation of columnar basalt on Hooker Island's shore. This place is the home of many birds.

=== Adjacent islands ===
==== Leigh-Smith Island ====
Ostrov Li-Smita (Остров Ли-Смита), Leigh-Smith Island lies east of Hooker island, separated from it by a 6 km wide sound called Proliv Smitsona. It is 14 km long and has a maximum width of 6.5 km. The island's highest point is 309 m and its surface is wholly glacierized except for a small area at its northern point and another around Mys Bitterburga, its southernmost cape. This island is named after British yachtsman and explorer Benjamin Leigh Smith.

==== Royal Society Island ====
West of Leigh-Smith Island's northern end, off Hooker island's northeastern shore, there is a smaller island known as Royal Society Island (Остров Королевского Общества), named after the Royal Geographical Society (80°16′N 53°44′E). It is 6 km long and has a maximum width of 2.5 km.

==== Scott-Keltie Island ====
Ostrov Skott-Kyelti (Остров Скотт-Келти), Scott-Keltie Island, highest point 64 m, is an island off Bukhta Tikhaya, in the northwest of Hooker Island. This island was named in honor of Sir John Scott Keltie (1840-1927), Scottish geographer.

==== Eaton Island ====
Ostrov Iton (Остров Итон), Eaton Island, is a small, 3 km long island lying 10 km to the west of Scott-Keltie Island. Eaton Island was named after British scientist Rev. Alfred Edvin Eaton (1844-1929), who studied the Arctic flora and fauna and travelled to Svalbard and Kerguelen.

==== Newton Island ====
Ostrov Niutona (Остров Ньютона), Newton Island, is a small island located 11 km due south off Hooker Island's southern shore. This island was named in honor of Alfred Newton.

==== May Island ====
Ostrov Mey (Остров Мей), May Island, is a double small island lying 5 km off Hooker Island's southwestern shores. It was named after Royal Navy officer and watercolour artist Walter Waller May (1830-1896).

==== Etheridge Islands ====
Ostrova Eteridzh (Острова Этеридж), the Etheridge Islands, are a group of two small islets located about 6 km west of May Island. These islands were named in honor of scientist Robert Etheridge who studied the Paleontology of the coasts of the Arctic lands visited by the British Arctic Expedition under Captain Sir George Nares.

== See also ==
- List of glaciers in Russia
- Vladimir Wiese
