= Bell Island (Franz Josef Land) =

Island in the Franz Josef Land archipelago in Arkhangelsk Oblast, Russia

Russian: Остров Белл
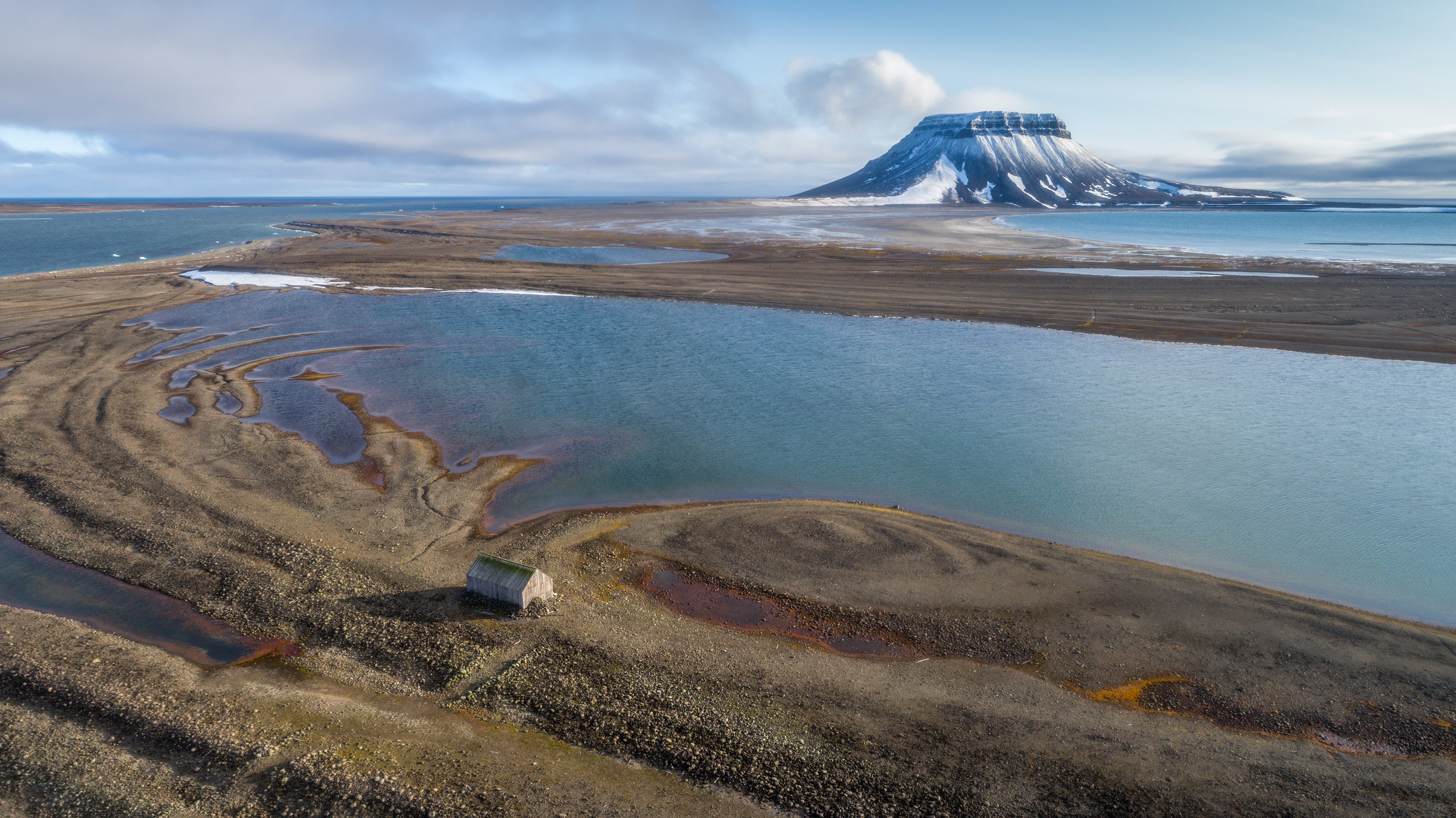
- Bell Island with Benjamin Leigh Smith's Eira lodge in foreground
- Interactive map of Bell Island

Geography
- Location: Arctic Ocean
- Coordinates: 80°00′24″N 49°15′49″E
- Archipelago: Franz Josef Land
- Highest elevation: 343 m (1125 ft)
- Highest point: Bell Mountain

Administration
- Russia

Bell Island (Russian: Остров Белл) is a small island in the south-west of the Franz Josef Land archipelago in Arkhangelsk Oblast, Russia. The island was named by English explorer Benjamin Leigh Smith for its bell-shaped mountain, rising steeply from the island's southern coast with the Barents Sea.

== History ==
On July 11, 1880, John Gray's Hope and David Gray's Eclipse met up with the Eira and Leigh Smith. Photographer W.J.A. Grant took a photograph aboard the Eira of Arthur Conan Doyle along with Smith, the Gray brothers, and ship’s surgeon William Neale. This was the Smith exploration of Franz Josef Land that on August 18 resulted in the naming of Cape Flora, Bell Island, Nightingale Sound, Gratton ("Uncle Joe") Island, and Mabel Island.

The island was the first among the Franz Josef archipelago to be visited by Benjamin Leigh Smith in his 1880 expedition. In his second expedition to the islands in 1881, Smith built a wooden lodge on the north side of the island which he used to winter. The lodge stands to this day. The island was later visited by the Svyataya Anna of the ill-fated Brusilov Expedition in 1914.
