= List of glaciers in Russia =

This is a list of glaciers in Russia. It includes glaciers, ice caps and ice domes located in the Russian Federation.

== List of glaciers and ice caps ==
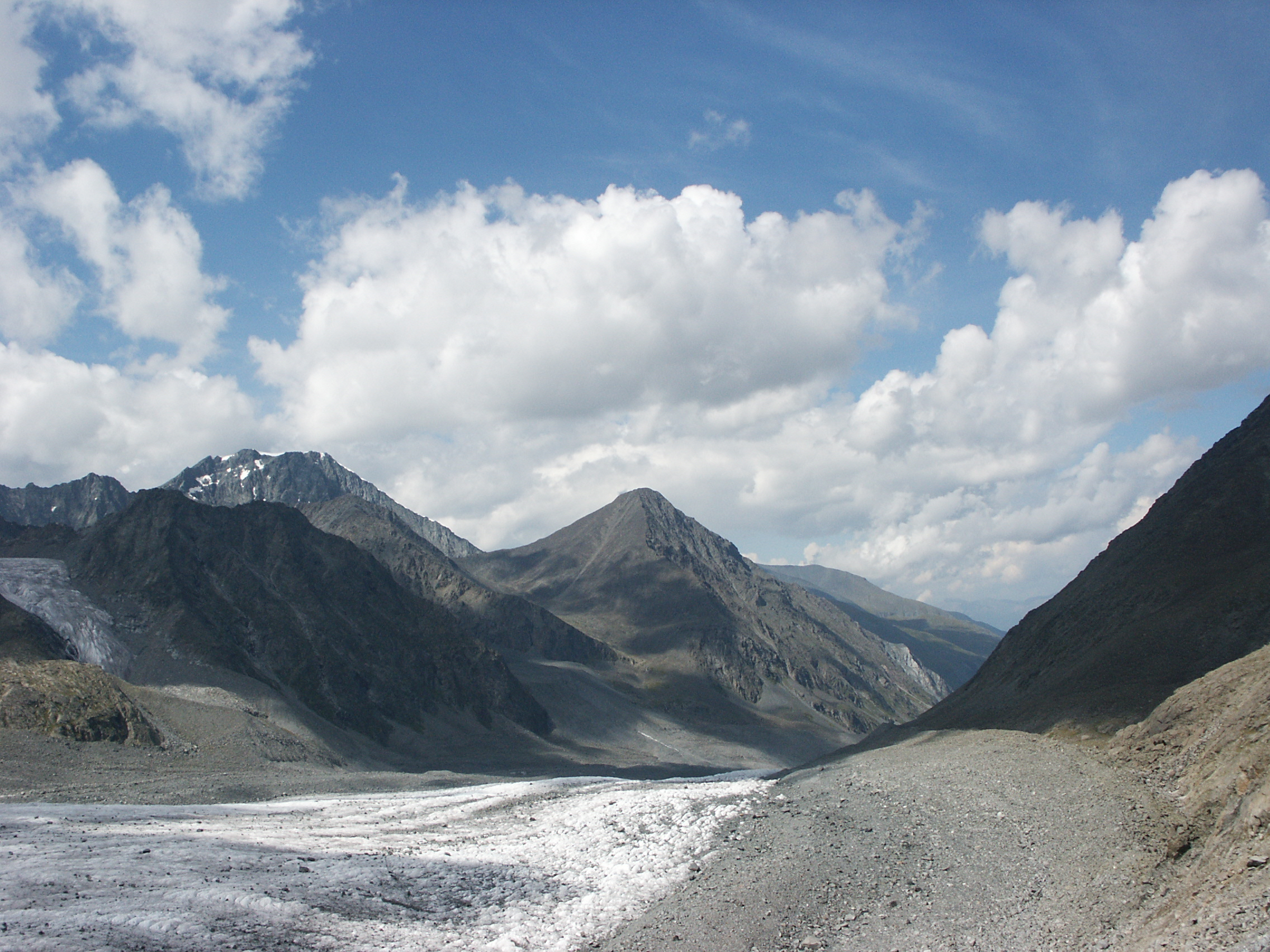
View of the Akkem Glacier in the Altai Mountains.

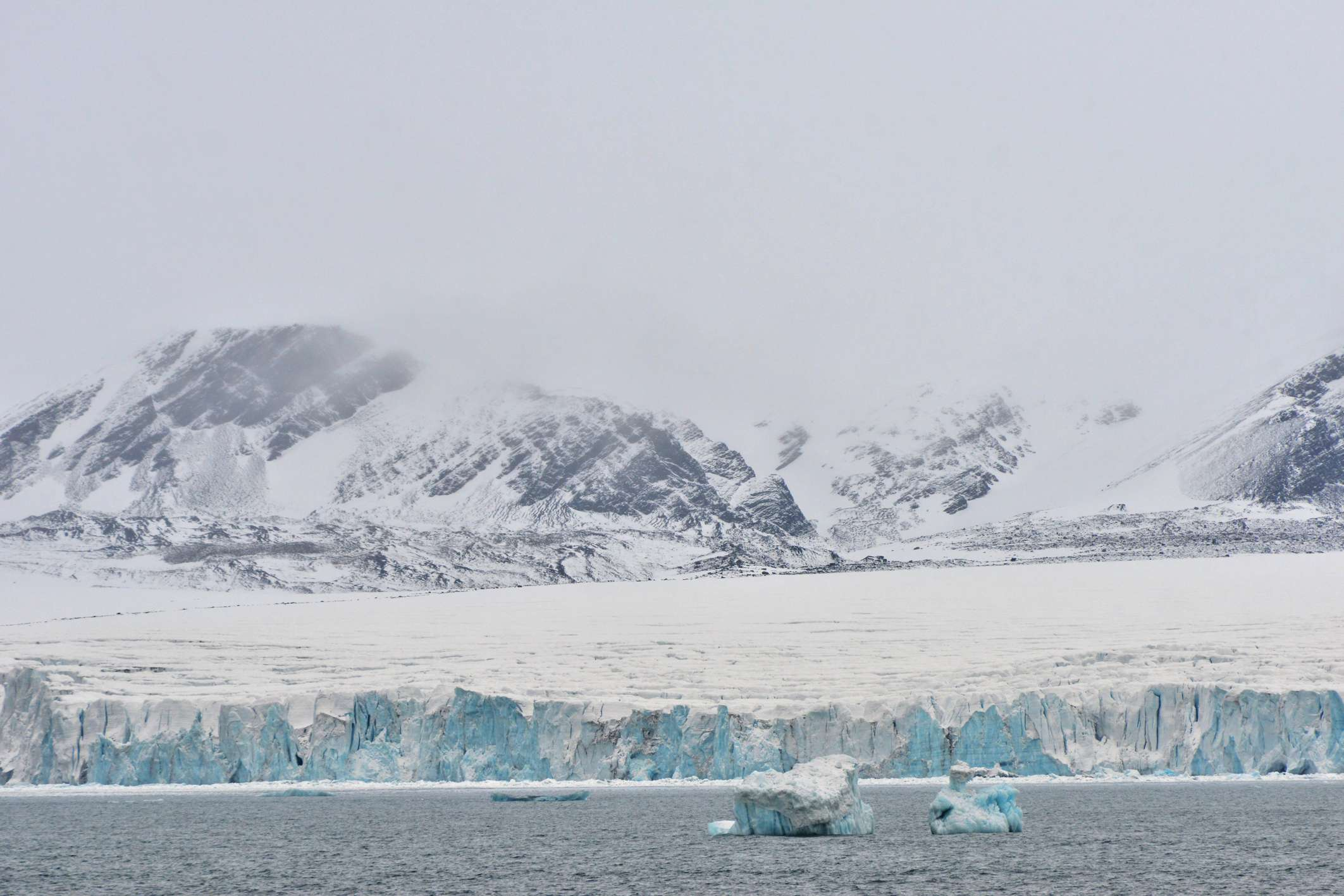
Inostrantsev Glacier terminus. Severny Island, west coast.

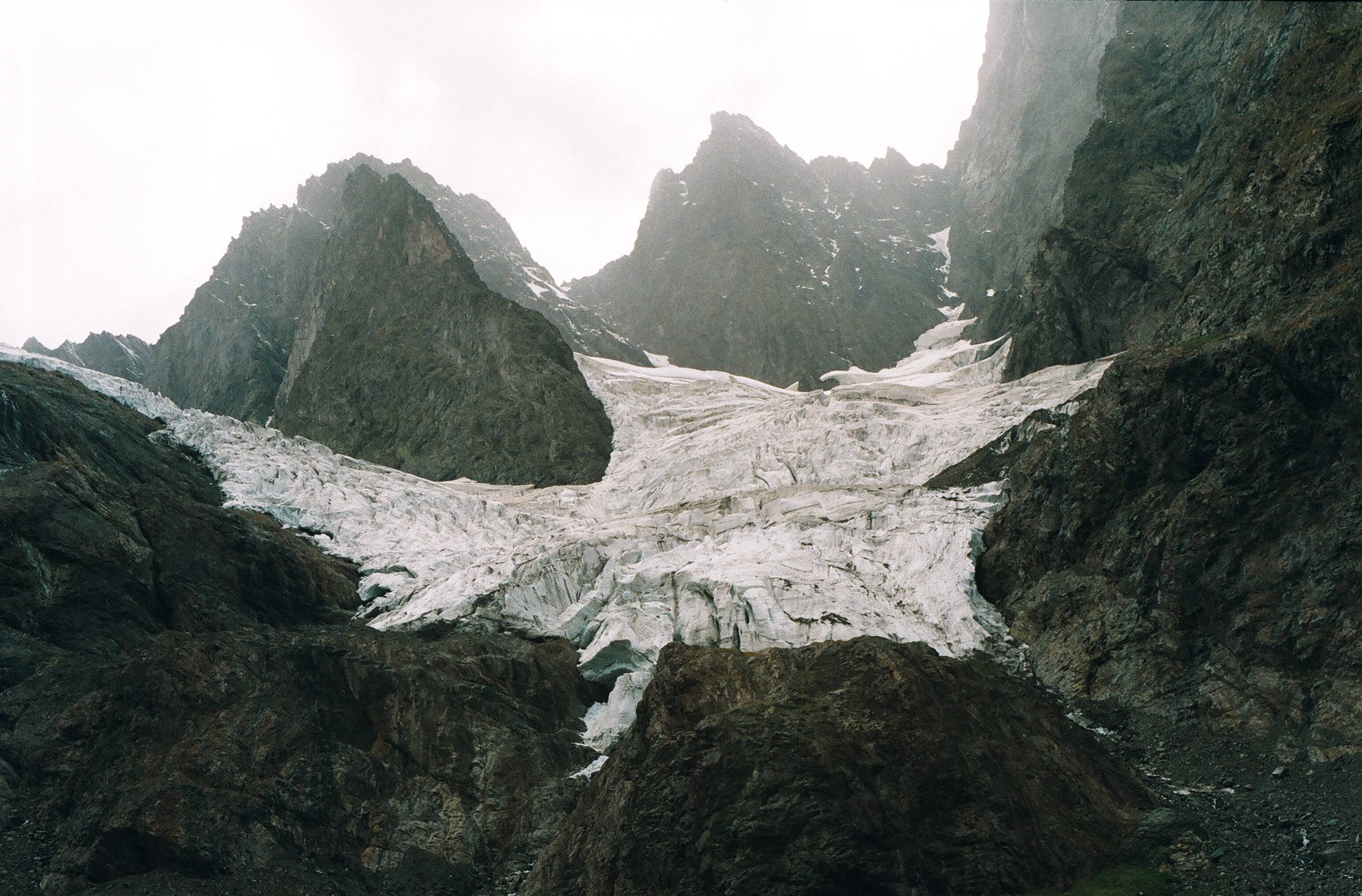
Zvezda Glacier in the Caucasus. Teberda Nature Reserve.

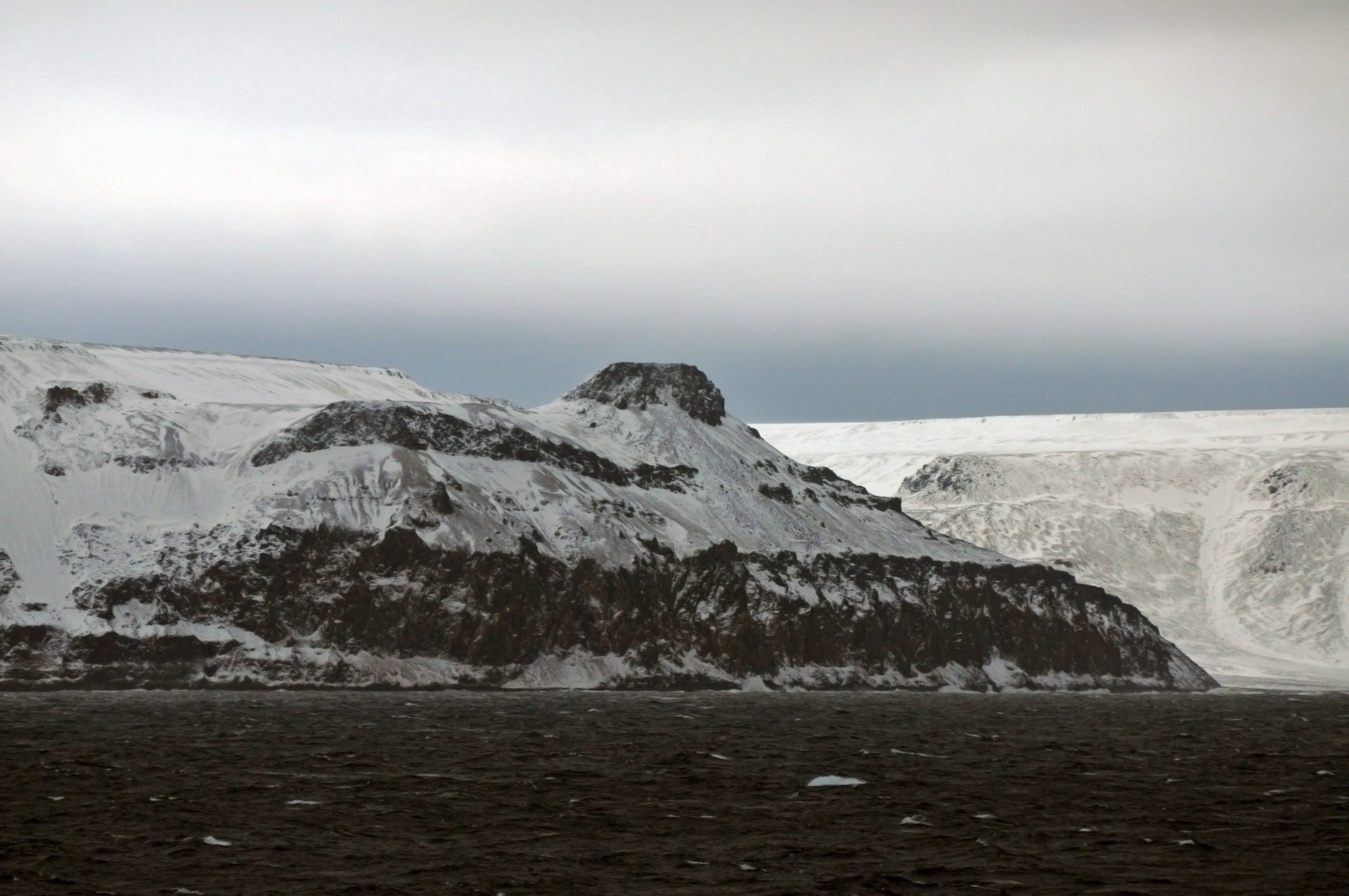
Shore of Bennett Island, De Long Islands. The ice cap on top consists of four separate glaciers.

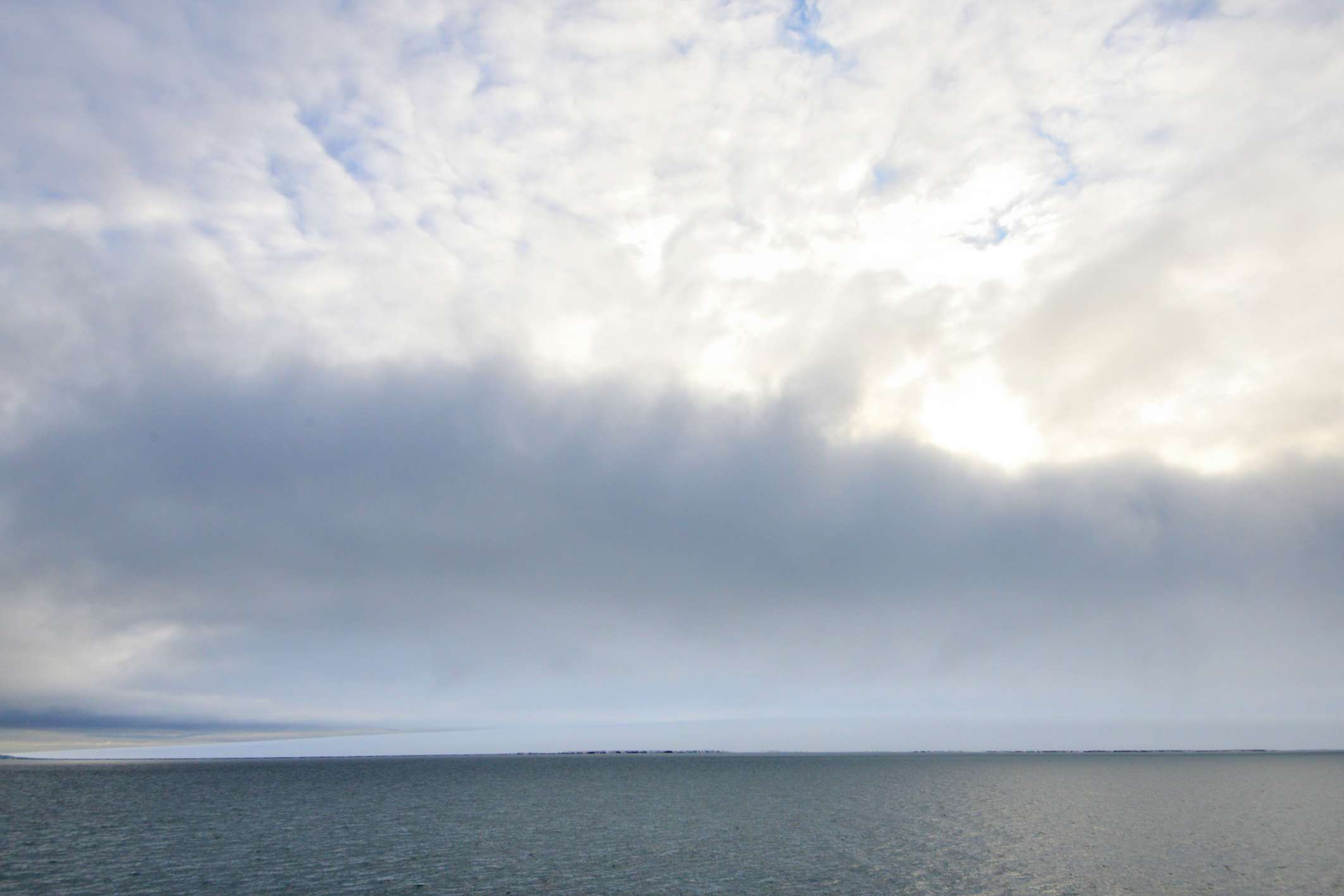
View of the ice cap covering Schmidt Island. Severnaya Zemlya.

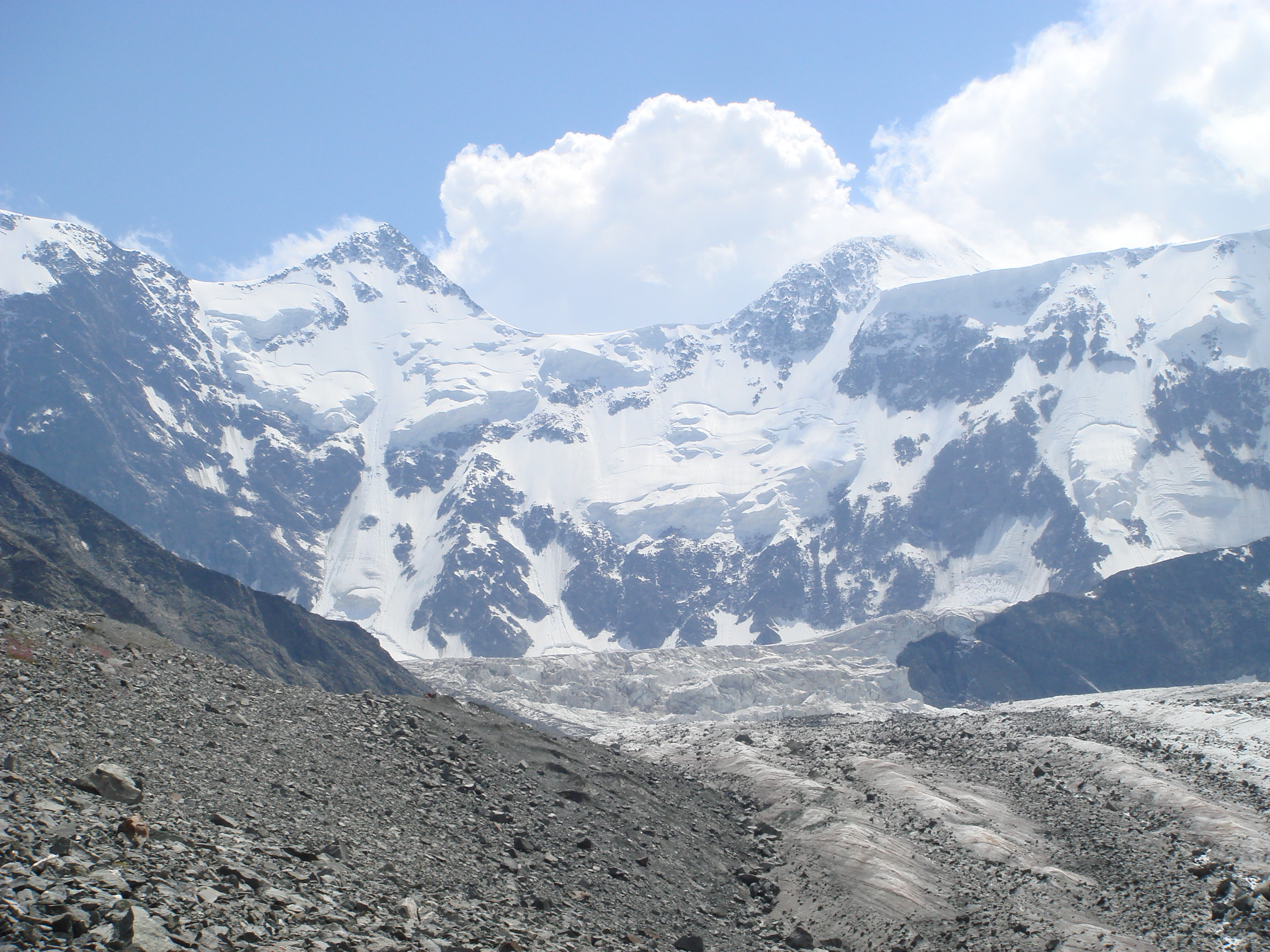
Belukha Glacier in the Altai Range.

=== Ice caps ===
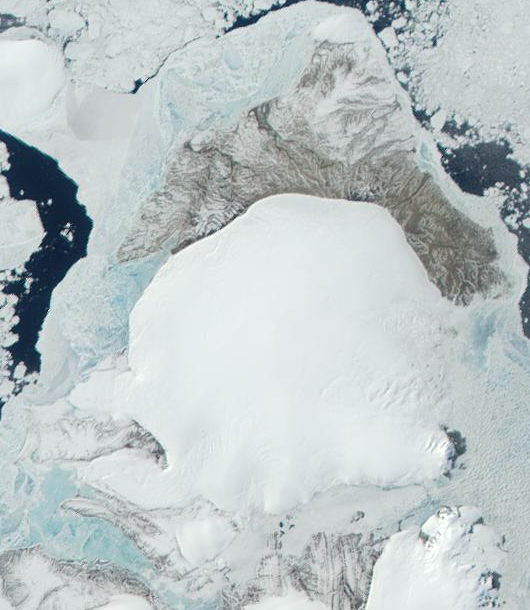
The massive Academy of Sciences Glacier, the largest in the Russian Federation, covering over two thirds of Komsomolets Island.

- Academy of Sciences Glacier (Lednik Akademii Nauk) – Severnaya Zemlya. Largest single ice formation in Russia
- Albanov Glacier (Lednik Al'banova) – Severnaya Zemlya
- Chernyshev Ice Cap (Lednik Chernysheva) – Franz Josef Land
- De Long East Glacier – Bennett Island. De Long Islands
- De Long West Glacier – Bennett Island. De Long Islands
- Henrietta Island ice cap – De Long Islands
- Jeannette Island ice cap – De Long Islands
- Karpinsky Glacier (Lednik Karpinskogo) – Severnaya Zemlya
- Leningradsky ice cap (Lednik Leningradskiy) – Severnaya Zemlya
- Malyy Glacier – Bennett Island. De Long Islands
- Pioneer Glacier (Lednik Pioner) – Severnaya Zemlya
- Rusanov Glacier (Lednik Rusanova) – Severnaya Zemlya
- Schmidt Island ice cap – Severnaya Zemlya
- Severny Island ice cap – Novaya Zemlya (Largest glacier complex by area in Europe)
- Toll Glacier (Lednik Tollya) – Bennett Island. De Long Islands
- University Glacier (Lednik Universitetskiy) – Severnaya Zemlya
- Ushakov Island ice cap – Kara Sea
- Vavilov Glacier (Lednik Vavilova) – Severnaya Zemlya
- Victoria Island ice cap – near Franz Josef Land

==== Franz Josef Land ice domes ====
This section includes ice domes in Franz Josef Land. Some islands have more than one.

- Kupol Arktirazvedki, Wilczek Land
- Kupol Brusilova, Zemlya Georga
- Kupol Dzhensona, Hooker Island
- Kupol Frolova, Payer Island
- Kupol Kropotkina, Alexandra Land, Polyarnykh Letchikov Peninsula
- Kupol Lunnyy, Alexandra Land
- Kupol Moskvy, Hall Island
- Kupol Oblachnyy, Wilczek Land
- Kupol Samoylovicha, Karl-Alexander Island
- Kupol Surova, Becker Island
- Kupol Tindalya, Wilczek Land
- Kupol Tumannyy, Zemlya Georga
- Kupol Vetrenyy, Graham Bell Island
- Kupol Vostok Chetviortyy, Eva Island
- Kupol Vostok Pervyy, Alger Island
- Kupol Vostok Tretiy, Eva Island, Liv Peninsula
- Kupol Vostok Vtoroy, Rainer Island
- Kupol Yuriya, Hooker Island

=== Glaciers ===
- Akkem Glacier (Akkemskiy Lednik) – Altai
- Anna Glacier (Lednik Anny) – Novaya Zemlya
- Anuchin Glacier (Lednik Anuchina) – Novaya Zemlya
- Arkhangel Bay Glacier (Lednik Arkhangel'skoy Guby) – Novaya Zemlya
- Baksan Glacier or Azau Glacier (Lednik Baksankiy) – Caucasus
- Belukha Glacier (Lednik Belukha) – Altaii
- Bezengi Glacier (Lednik Bezengi) – Caucasus
- Brounov Glacier (Lednik Brounova) – Novaya Zemlya
- Borzov Glacier (Lednik Borzova) – Novaya Zemlya
- Bull Glacier (Lednik Bull) – Novaya Zemlya
- Bunge Glacier (Lednik Bunge) – Novaya Zemlya
- Chayev Glacier (Lednik Chayeva) – Novaya Zemlya
- Chernishev Glacier (Lednik Chernishëva) – Novaya Zemlya
- Devdaraki – Caucasus (Georgia / Russia)
- Dezhnev Glacier (Lednik Dezhnëva) – Severnaya Zemlya
- Dykh-Kotyu-Bugoysu – Caucasus
- Gebler Glacier (Lednik Geblera) – Altai
- Glazov Glacier (Lednik Glazov) – Novaya Zemlya
- Goluboy Glacier (Lednik Goluboy) – Novaya Zemlya
- Great Taldurin Glacier (Bolshoy Taldurinskiy Lednik) – Altai
- Grotov Glacier (Lednik Grotov) – Severnaya Zemlya
- Inostrantsev Glacier (Lednik Inostrantseva) – Novaya Zemlya
- Karaugom Glacier- Caucasus
- Karbasnikov Glacier (Lednik Karbasnikova) – Novaya Zemlya
- Kirov Glacier (Lednik Kirova) – Franz Josef Land
- Kolka Glacier – Caucasus
- Krayniy Glacier (Lednik Krayniy) – Novaya Zemlya
- Kropotkin Glacier (Lednik Kropotkina) – Novaya Zemlya
- Kropotkin Glacier (Lednik Kropotkina) – Severnaya Zemlya
- Lakrua Glacier (Lednik Lakrua) – Novaya Zemlya
- Little Aktru Glacier (Maly Aktru Lednik) – Altai
- Little Fisht Glacier (Maly Fishtinsky Lednik) – Caucasus
- Mack Glacier (Lednik Maka) – Novaya Zemlya
- Maili Glacier – Caucasus
- Malyutka Glacier (Lednik Malyutka) – Severnaya Zemlya
- Mashey Glacier (Lednik Mashey) – Altai
- Middendorff Glacier (Lednik Middendorfa) – Franz Josef Land
- Molochnyy Glacier (Lednik Molochnyy) – Franz Josef Land
- Molotov Glacier (Lednik Molotova) – Severnaya Zemlya
- Moschnyy Glacier (Lednik Moschnyy) – Novaya Zemlya
- Mushketov Glacier (Lednik Mushketova) – Severnaya Zemlya
- Nansen Glacier (Lednik Nansena) – Novaya Zemlya
- Neponyatyy Glacier (Lednik Neponyatyy) – Severnaya Zemlya
- Niny Glacier (Lednik Niny) – Franz Josef Land
- Nizkiy Glacier (Lednik Nizkiy) – Novaya Zemlya
- Nordenskiöld Glacier (Lednik Nordenshel'da) – Franz Josef Land
- Nordenskiöld Glacier (Lednik Nordenshel'da), group of four glaciers – Novaya Zemlya
  - Vershinsky Glacier (Lednik Vershinskogo)
  - Novopashenny Glacier (Lednik Novopashennogo), also known as Lednik Sredniy
  - Rozhdestvensky Glacier (Lednik Rozhdestvenskogo)
  - Roze Glacier (Lednik Roze)
- Obruchev Glacier (Lednik Obrucheva) – Franz Josef Land
- Otdel’nyy Glacier (Lednik Otdel’nyy) – Severnaya Zemlya
- Pavlov Glacier (Lednik Pavlova) – Novaya Zemlya
- Payer Glacier (Lednik Payyera) – Franz Josef Land
- Petersen Glacier (Lednik Petersena) – Novaya Zemlya
- Popov Glacier (Lednik Popova) – Novaya Zemlya
- Polisadov Glacier (Lednik Polisadova) – Novaya Zemlya
- Rikachev Glacier (Lednik Rykachëva) – Novaya Zemlya
- Semyonov-Tyan-Shansky Glacier (Lednik Semënova Tyan-Shanskogo) – Severnaya Zemlya
- Serp i Molot Glacier (Lednik Serp i Molot) – Novaya Zemlya
- Severnyy Glacier (Lednik Severnyy) – Novaya Zemlya
- Shirokiy Glacier (Lednik Shirokiy) – Novaya Zemlya
- Shokalsky Glacier (Lednik Shokal'skogo) – Novaya Zemlya
- Sonklar Glacier (Lednik Sonklar) – Franz Josef Land
- Sophia Glacier (Sofiyskiy Lednik) – Altai
- Stremitel’nyy Glacier (Lednik Stremitel’nyy) – Franz Josef Land
- Taisiya Glacier (Lednik Taisiya) – Novaya Zemlya
- Tseyskoe Glacier – Caucasus
- Ukoksky Glacier (Lednik Ukokskiy) – Altai
- Ushkovsky Glacier (Lednik Ushkovskiy) – Kamchatka
- Velken Glacier (Lednik Vel'kena) – Novaya Zemlya
- Vera Glacier (Lednik Vera) – Novaya Zemlya
- Vitte Glacier (Lednik Vitte) – Novaya Zemlya
- Viz Glacier (Lednik Viz) – Franz Josef Land
- Vize Glacier (Lednik Vize) – Novaya Zemlya
- Voyekov Glacier (Lednik Voyekova) – Novaya Zemlya
- Worcester Glacier (Lednik Vuster) – Franz Josef Land
- Yuzhnyy Glacier (Lednik Yuzhnyy) – Novaya Zemlya
- Znamenityy Glacier (Lednik Znamenityy) – Franz Josef Land
- Zvezda Glacier (Lednik Zvezda) – Caucasus

== See also ==
- List of glaciers in Europe
- List of glaciers in Asia
- List of fjords in Russia
