= Kuhn Island (Franz Josef Land) =

Island in Franz Josef Land, Arkhangelsk Oblast, Russia

Остров Куна
- Kuhn Island, within the Zichy Land islands

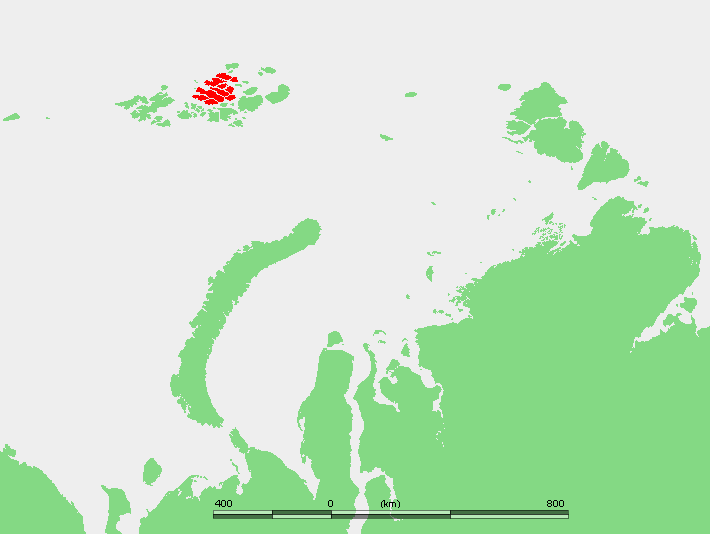
- Location of the Zichy Land subgroup of the Franz Josef Archipelago. Kuhn Island is located towards its eastern side.

Geography
- Location: Arctic
- Coordinates: 81.125444°N 58.392893°E
- Archipelago: Franz Josef Archipelago
- Area: 17.5 km^{2} (6.8 sq mi)
- Highest elevation: 228 m (748 ft)

Administration
- Russia

Demographics
- Population: 0

Kuhn Island (Russian: Остров Куна; Ostrov Kuna) is an island in Franz Josef Land, Arkhangelsk Oblast, Russia.

== Geography ==
The island has a maximum altitude of 228 m (748 ft). Between its westernmost point, Cape Golovin (Russian: мыс Головина), and its easternmost point, Cape Obryvisty (Russian: мыс Обрывистый), it is about 8 km (5 mi) in length. Just south of Kuhn Island lies the small Brosch Island (Russian: Остров Брош, Ostrov Brosh) with a maximum height of 85 m (279 ft). Kane Island lies to the east. All three islands are separated from the larger Greely Island to the south by the Sternek Strait (Russian: пролив Штернека).

== History ==
The island was discovered by the Austro-Hungarian North Pole expedition in 1874 and was named in honour of the Austro-Hungarian minister of war Franz Kuhn von Kuhnenfeld, a patron of Julius Payer, one of the expedition's leaders.

== See also ==
- Franz Josef Land
- List of islands of Russia
