= Koelewijn =

Koelewijn is a Dutch surname. The name translates to "cool wine" in English, but it originated as koele wei, meaning "cool whey", a metonymic reference to a dairy farmer. Among variant forms are Collewijn, Koldewijn, Kollewijn, Koldeweij and Koldewey. People with the name include:

- Job Koelewijn (born 1962), Dutch contemporary artist
- Peter Koelewijn (born 1940), Dutch singer, songwriter, music manager and record producer
- Thomas Koelewijn (born 1988), Dutch volleyball player

Kollewijn

- Roeland Anthonie Kollewijn (1857–1942), Dutch linguist who proposed spelling reforms that have been implemented both in Dutch and Afrikaans
