= Becker Island =

Island in Russia

Остров Беккера
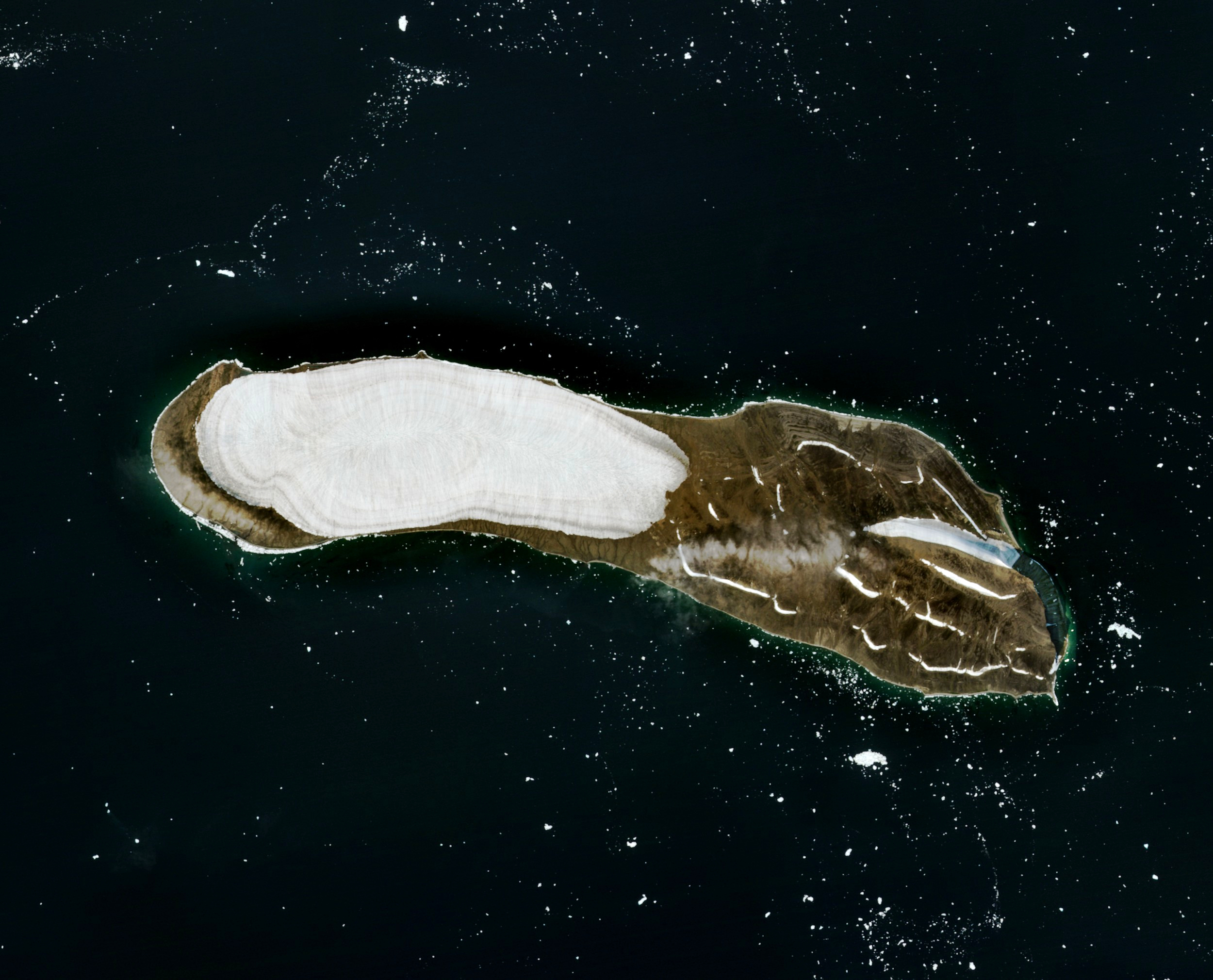
- Sentinel-2 image (2020)

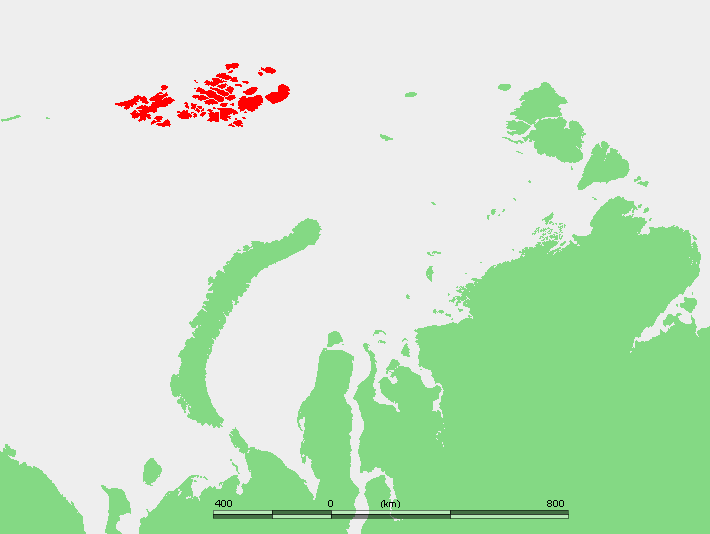
- Location of the Franz Josef Archipelago.

Geography
- Location: Arctic
- Coordinates: 81.191389°N 59.317500°E
- Archipelago: Franz Josef Archipelago
- Length: 14 km (8.7 mi)
- Width: 3 km (1.9 mi)
- Highest elevation: 165 m (541 ft)

Administration
- Russian Federation

Demographics
- Population: 0

Becker Island (Russian: Остров Беккера; Ostrov Bekkera) is an island in Franz Josef Land, Arkhangelsk Oblast, Russian Arctic.

Becker Island was named after Moritz Alois Becker (1812-1887), the general secretary of Austrian Geographical Society.

== Geography ==
Becker Island is long and narrow, stretching from East to West. It is located straight south of Rainer Island. Its length is 14 km (8.7 mi) and its average width 3 km (1.9 mi).

The Kupol Surova (Купол Сурова) ice dome covers the western part of the island. The highest point of Becker Island is a 165 m (541 ft) high summit located at the eastern end. The eastern half of this island is unglacierized. The eastern headland, Cape Galkovsky (Mys Galkovskogo) is relatively close to the island's highest point. The western headland is Cape Lopast.

== See also ==
- List of islands of Russia
- List of glaciers in Russia
