= Salm Island =

Island in Franz Josef Land, Arkhangelsk Oblast, Russia

Salm Island остров Сальм
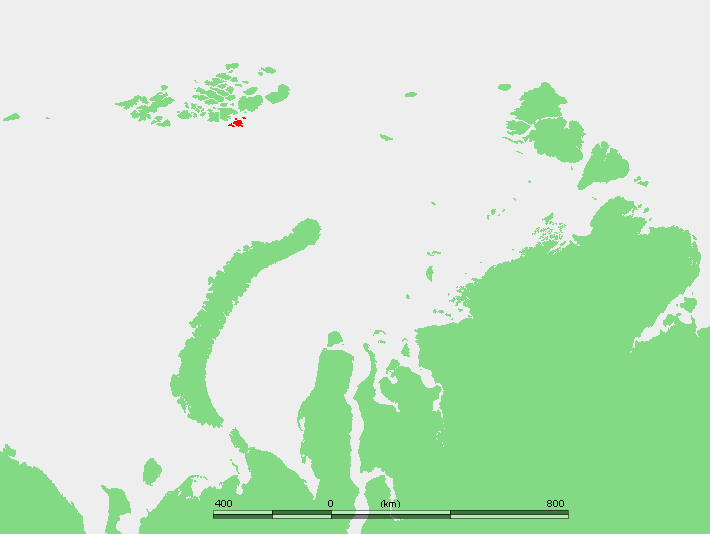
- Location of Salm Island and its neighboring islands in the Franz Josef Archipelago

- Location within Russia

Geography
- Location: Arctic Ocean
- Coordinates: 80°04′N 59°16′E
- Archipelago: Franz Josef Land
- Length: 20 km (12 mi)
- Highest elevation: 343 m (1125 ft)
- Highest point: Chernyshev Ice Cap

Administration
- Russia

Salm Island (Russian: остров Сальм; Ostrov Sal'm) is a roughly round-shaped island in Franz Josef Land, Arkhangelsk Oblast, Russia.

Salm Island was named by the Austro-Hungarian North Pole Expedition after the Salm-Hoogstraten aristocratic dynasty to which Count Karl Alexander, one of the expedition's main sponsors, belonged.

== Geography ==
Salm Island is almost completely glacierized except for two headlands in its western and its southern shore. The Chernyshev Ice Cap (Lednik Chernysheva) covers most of the island. Salm Island's maximum length is 17 km (11 mi) and its area is 344 km^{2} (133 sq mi). The highest point of the island is 343 m high summit of the Chernyshev Ice Cap.

=== Adjacent smaller islands ===
Salm Island is surrounded by smaller islands. Ostrova Bisernyye are two small islets located right off Salm Island's southern shore.

==== Wilczek Island ====
Southwest of Salm Island lies 10 km (6 mi) long Wilczek Island (остров Вильчека) —which should not be confused with Wilczek Land in the same archipelago. It is separated from Salm Island by a 3 km (2 mi) wide sound. This island is named after Austro-Hungarian nobleman Johann Nepomuk Graf Wilczek.

==== Lütke Island ====
4 km (2 mi) southeast of Salm Island lies small and round Lütke Island (остров Литке). Its area is 14 km^{2} (5 sq mi) and it was named after Russian Count Fyodor Petrovich Litke.

==== Hochstetter Islands ====
A few miles to the northeast lie the Hochstetter Islands (острова Гохштеттера or острова Хохштеттера), made up of a 6.5 km (4 mi) long by 4 km (2 mi) wide island, Hochstetter Island (also known as Gogstettera Yuzhnyy), and two smaller islets Gogstettera Sredniy and ostrov Al'batros. The Hochstetter Islands are named after the German Hochstetter princely dynasty of the Austro Hungarian Empire.

==== Koldewey Island ====
Roughly north lies 3.7 km (2 mi) long Koldewey Island (остров Kольдевея), named after Captain Carl Koldewey leader of the Second German Expedition to the Arctic in 1869–70. Highest point 66 m.

==== Schoenau Island ====
Off Koldewey Island's northern point lies the smaller Schoenau Island (остров Шёнау). This island was named after Teplitz-Schönau (now Teplice, Czech Republic), the birthplace of Austro-Hungarian arctic explorer Julius Payer, who made the discovery of Franz Josef Land, when he led, as Commander at Shore, the Austro-Hungarian North Pole Expedition together with Commander at Sea Karl Weyprecht.

== See also ==
- Complete island list in Russian: ru:Список островов России
