= Sophus Torup =

Danish-Norwegian physiologist

Sophus Carl Frederik Torup
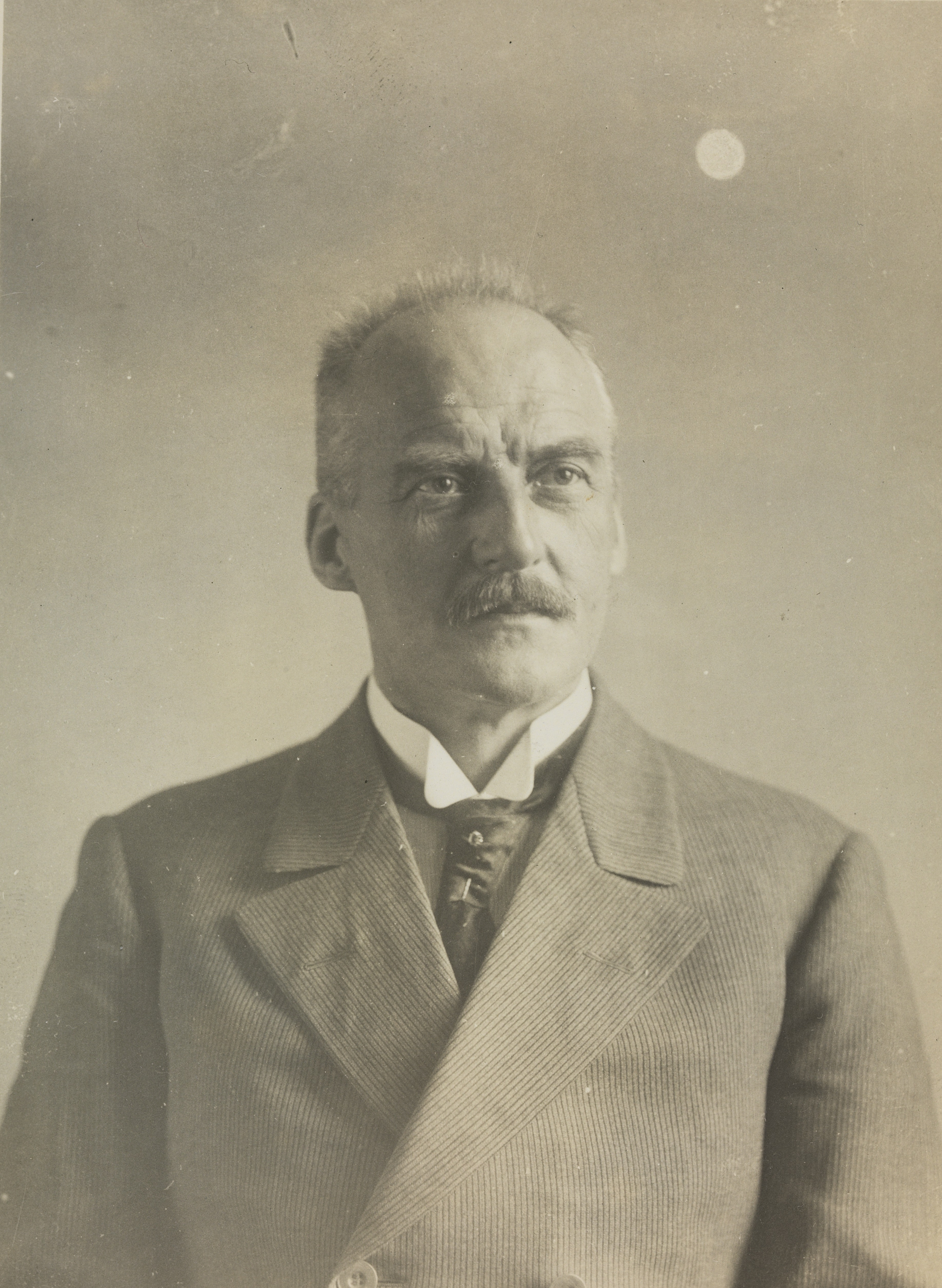
- Born: 15 August 1861; Nykøbing, Falster, Denmark
- Died: 30 November 1937 (aged 76); Oslo, Norway
- Occupation: Physiologist

Sophus Carl Frederik Torup (15 August 1861 – 30 November 1937) was a Danish physiologist who settled in Norway.

He was born in Nykøbing in Falster, Denmark, to Jacob Møller Torup and Gregerssine Juliane Marie Simonsen. He was appointed professor in physiology at the University of Oslo from 1889 to 1931. Among his research interests were hematology and nutrition. He made contributed as advicor to polar expeditions, and the Torupa Island, adjacent to Karl-Alexander Island in Franz Josef Land, is named after Torup. He was decorated Knight, First Class of the Order of St. Olav in 1900, and was Commander of the Order of Dannebrog.
