= Eva-Liv Island =

Island in Franz Josef Land, Arkhangelsk Oblast, Russian Arctic

Остров Ева-Лив
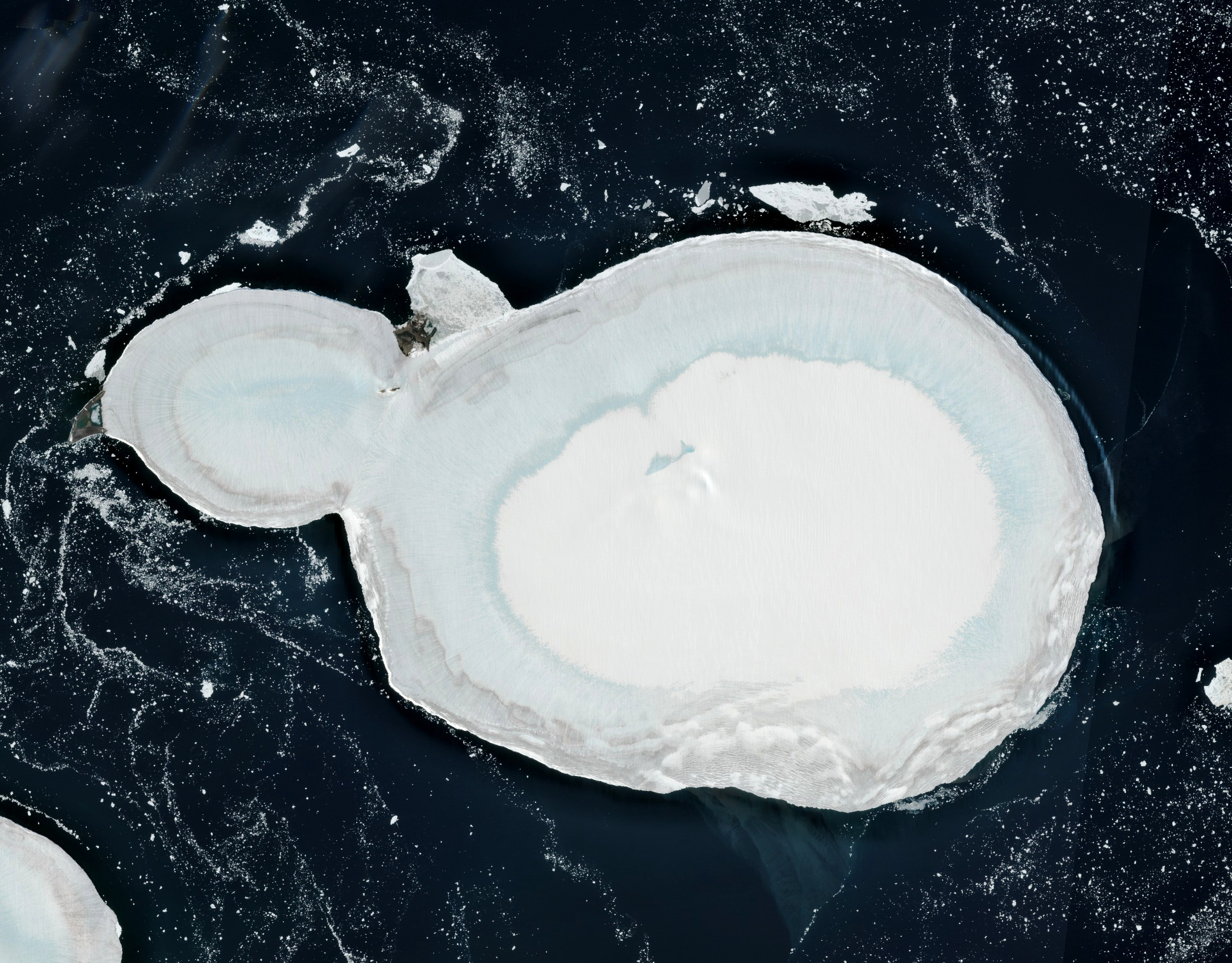
- Sentinel-2 image (2020)

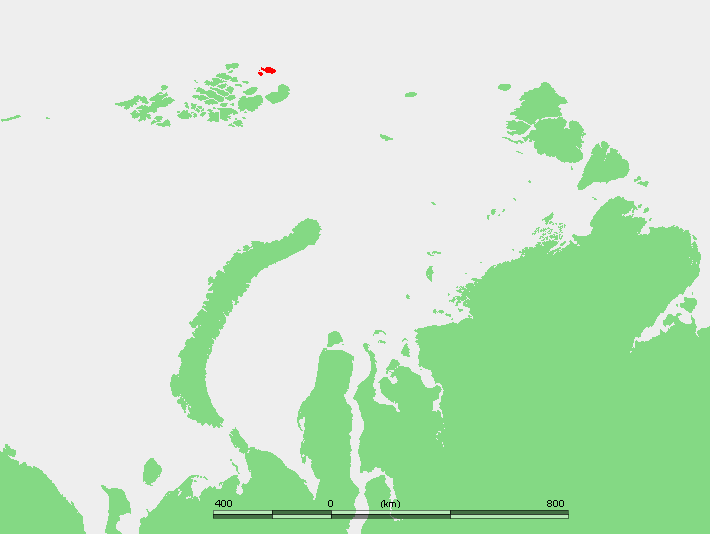
- Location of the Belaya Zemlya subgroup of the Franz Josef Archipelago

- Location off Russia

Geography
- Coordinates: 81°38′N 63°06′E
- Archipelago: Belaya Zemlya (subgroup); Franz Josef Land
- Area: 288 km^{2} (111 sq mi)
- Highest elevation: 381 m (1250 ft)
- Highest point: Kupol Vostok Chetvyortyy

Administration
- Russian Federation

Eva-Liv Island (Russian: Остров Ева-Лив; Ostrov Yeva-Liv), alternatively transcribed as Yeva-Liv Island, and also known as Eva Island, is the northeasternmost island in Franz Josef Land, Arkhangelsk Oblast, Russian Arctic.

== History ==
The area where Eva Island lies was named Hvidtenland (White Land) by Fridtjof Nansen who reached Eva Island's coast on August 5, 1895, during his polar expedition with Hjalmar Johansen which ended at Franz Josef Land. In his map he drew two islands and he named the largest one to the east Eva Island after his wife Eva Nansen (died in 1907). The "island" to the west, which Nansen reached two days later, was named "Liv Island".

This is the point of the Franz Josef Archipelago that Russian navigator Valerian Albanov of the doomed Brusilov expedition was trying to reach when he left the Svyataya Anna with part of the crew. Albanov, however, ended up far to the southwest in Alexandra Land.

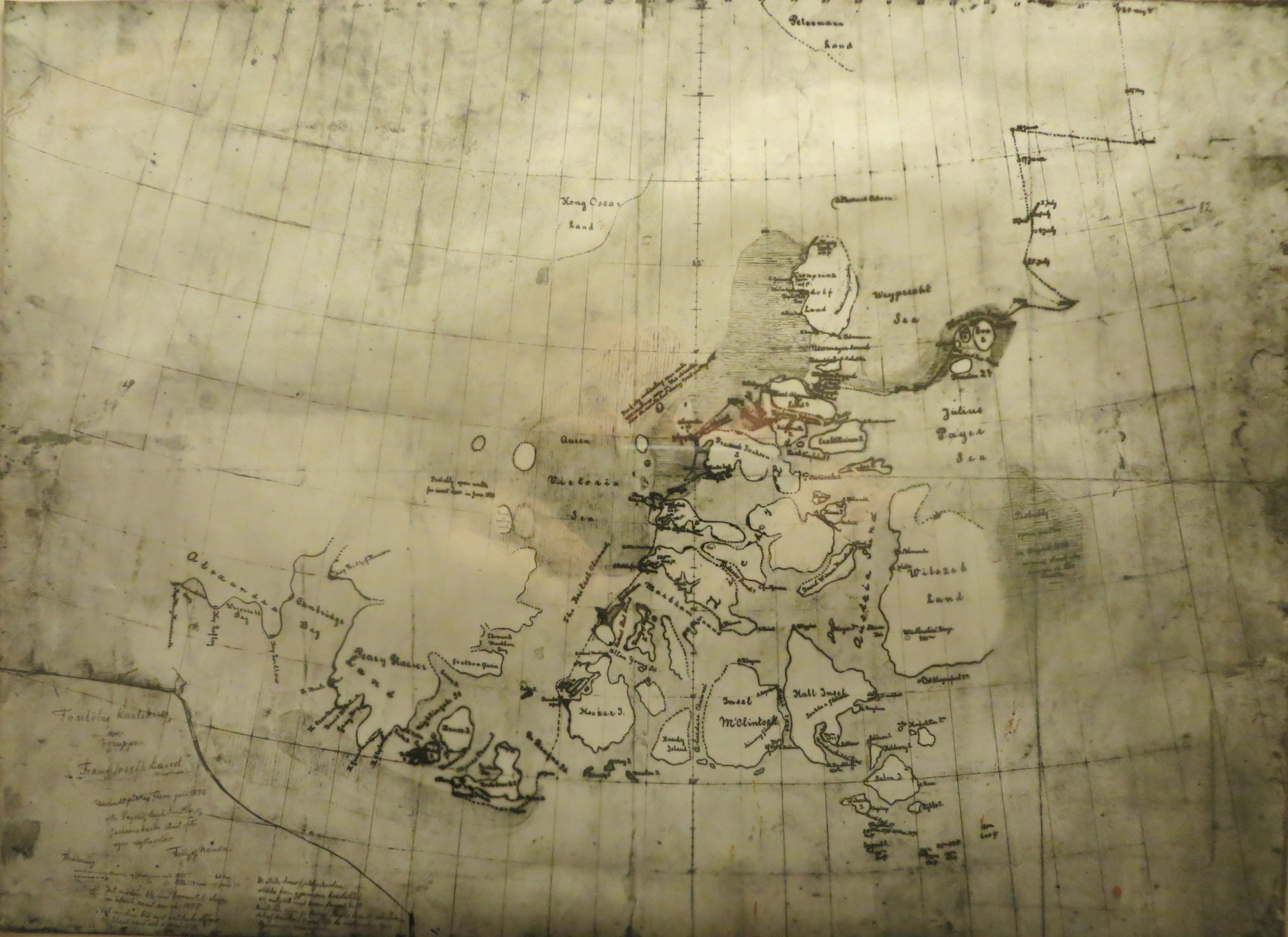
Original map of the route taken by Nansen and Johansen during their 1895-96 North Pole expedition.

Map of Nansen and Johansen's voyage through the archipelago. August 1895 to June 1896.

== Geography ==
Eva Island is roughly rabbit-shaped and its surface is 288 km^{2} (111 sq mi). The westernmost headland is Cape Kyuv, and the northernmost Cape Mesyatsev. The sea surrounding the island is frozen most of the year.

Since the limit of permanent ice crosses Belaya Zemlya, it is often difficult to distinguish between land and sea. However, as the cartography of the Franz Josef Archipelago became more accurate, it became apparent that "Liv Island" was only a peninsula at the western end of Eva Island. Therefore, some maps mention "Eva-Liv Island", a combination of both names. The bay formed by the isthmus area on the northern side is Bukhta Kapriznaya.

=== Ice domes ===
Eva Island is totally covered by Kupol Vostok Chetviortyy (Купол Восток Четвёртый), an ice dome reaching 382 m (1,253 ft) at its summit, which is also the highest point of the island. The Liv Peninsula is covered by a smaller ice dome named Kupol Vostok Tretiy (Купол Восток Третий).

=== Adjacent Islands ===
The heavily glacierized group formed by Eva Island and its two adjacent small islands (Freeden and Adelaide) is still known in Russian as Белая Земля (Belaya Zemlya), also meaning "White Land", thus retaining Fridjof Nansen's original name.

Belaya Zemlya is separated from the main Franz Josef group by a 45 km (28 mi) broad strait known as Proliv Severo Vostochnyy. Eva Island is the northernmost of the group.

==== Adelaide Island ====
A few miles to the southwest lies small Adelaide Island (Остров Аделаиды), named in honor of Princess Adelheid of Hohenlohe-Langenburg. It is only 2 km (1.2 mi) in length.

==== Freeden Island ====
Freeden Island or Freden Island (Остров Фреден), is a larger oval-shaped island, with a length of 8.2 km (5.1 mi). It lies 2.5 km (1.6 mi) south of Adelaide Island. This island was named after Wilhelm von Freeden, founder of the North German Naval Observatory (Norddeutsche Seewarte).

== See also ==
- List of islands of Russia
- List of glaciers of Russia
