= Heinrich Berghaus =

German geographer and cartographer

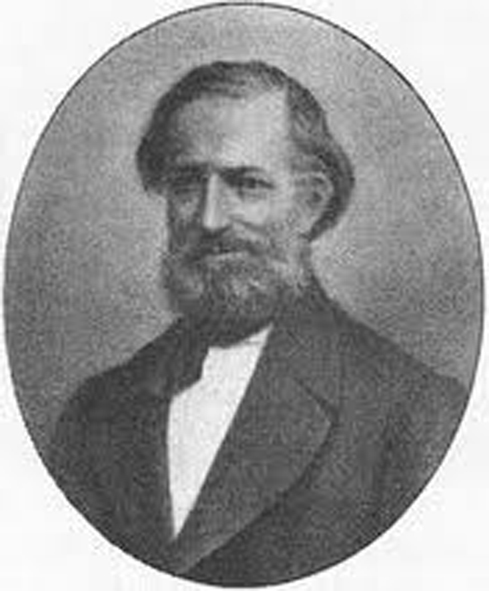

Heinrich Karl Wilhelm Berghaus (3 May 1797 – 17 February 1884) was a German geographer and cartographer who conducted trigonometric surveys in Prussia and taught geodesy at the Bauakademie in Berlin. He taught cartography and produced a pioneering and influential thematic atlas which provided maps of flora, fauna, climate, geology, diseases and a range of other information. He was a friend of Alexander von Humboldt and produced some of the maps used in his publications. A nephew Hermann Berghaus also worked in cartography.

== Life ==
Berghaus was born at Kleve. He was trained as a surveyor, and after volunteering for active service under General Tauentzien in 1813, joined the staff of the Prussian trigonometrical survey in 1816. He carried on a geographical school at Potsdam where he trained Heinrich Lange, August Heinrich Petermann, his nephew Hermann Berghaus and others, and long held the professorship of applied mathematics at the Bauakademie. He died at Stettin (Szczecin) on 17 February 1884.

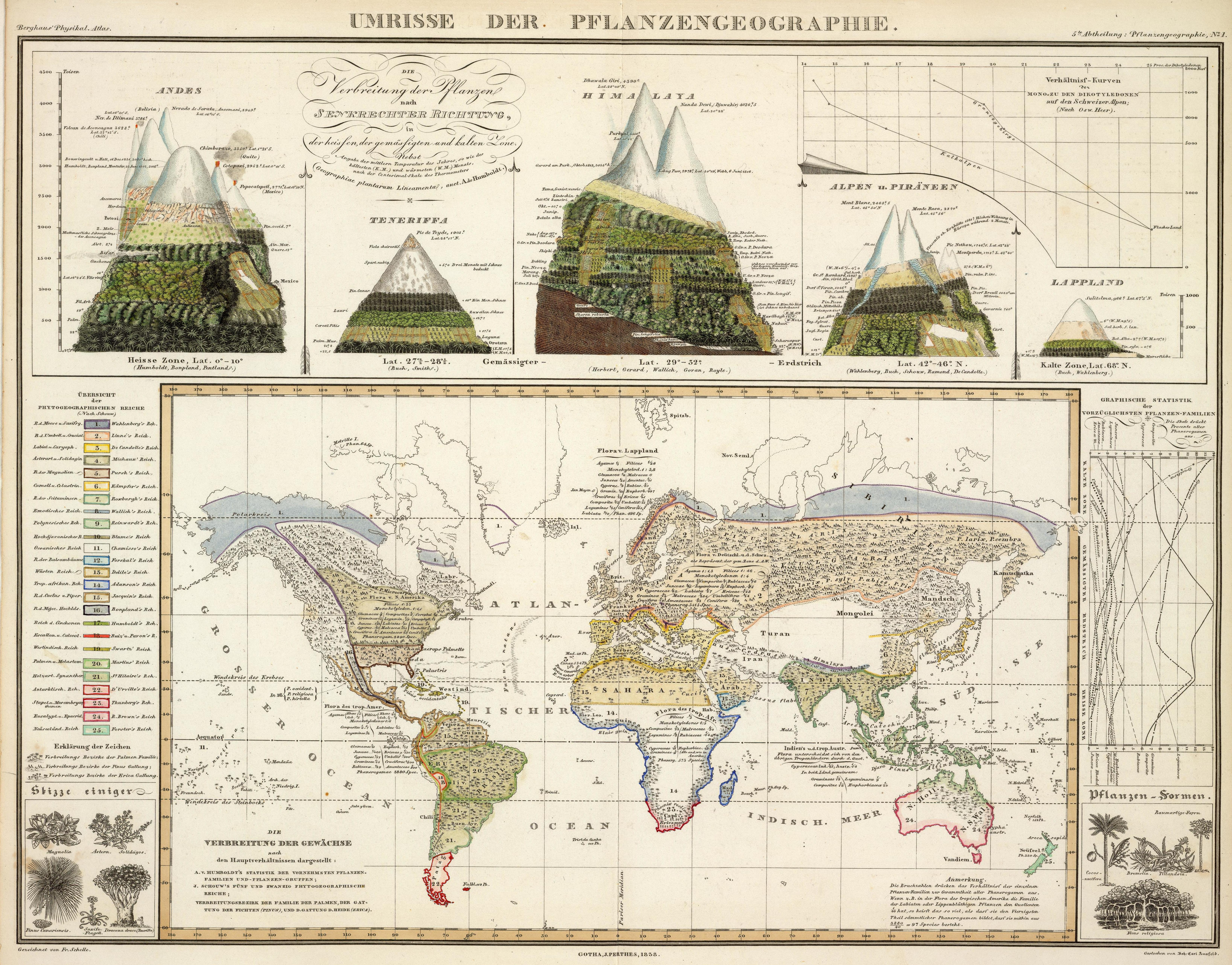
Umrisse Der Pflanzengeographie [Outline of plant geography] (1838), made for Humboldt

He is most famous for his cartographic work. His greatest achievement was the Physikalischer Atlas (Gotha, 1838–1848), with which, as in others, his nephew Hermann Berghaus (1828–1890) was associated with him. This atlas was used to illustrate Alexander von Humboldt's Cosmos. It was planned to publish this atlas in Britain too, together with Alexander Keith Johnston, but it later was published in a different form by Johnston alone. Berghaus had also a share in the re-issue of the great Stieler Handatlas (originally produced by Adolf Stieler in 1817–1823, see: Stielers Handatlas), and in the production of other atlases.

The sections of the Physikalischer Atlas were:

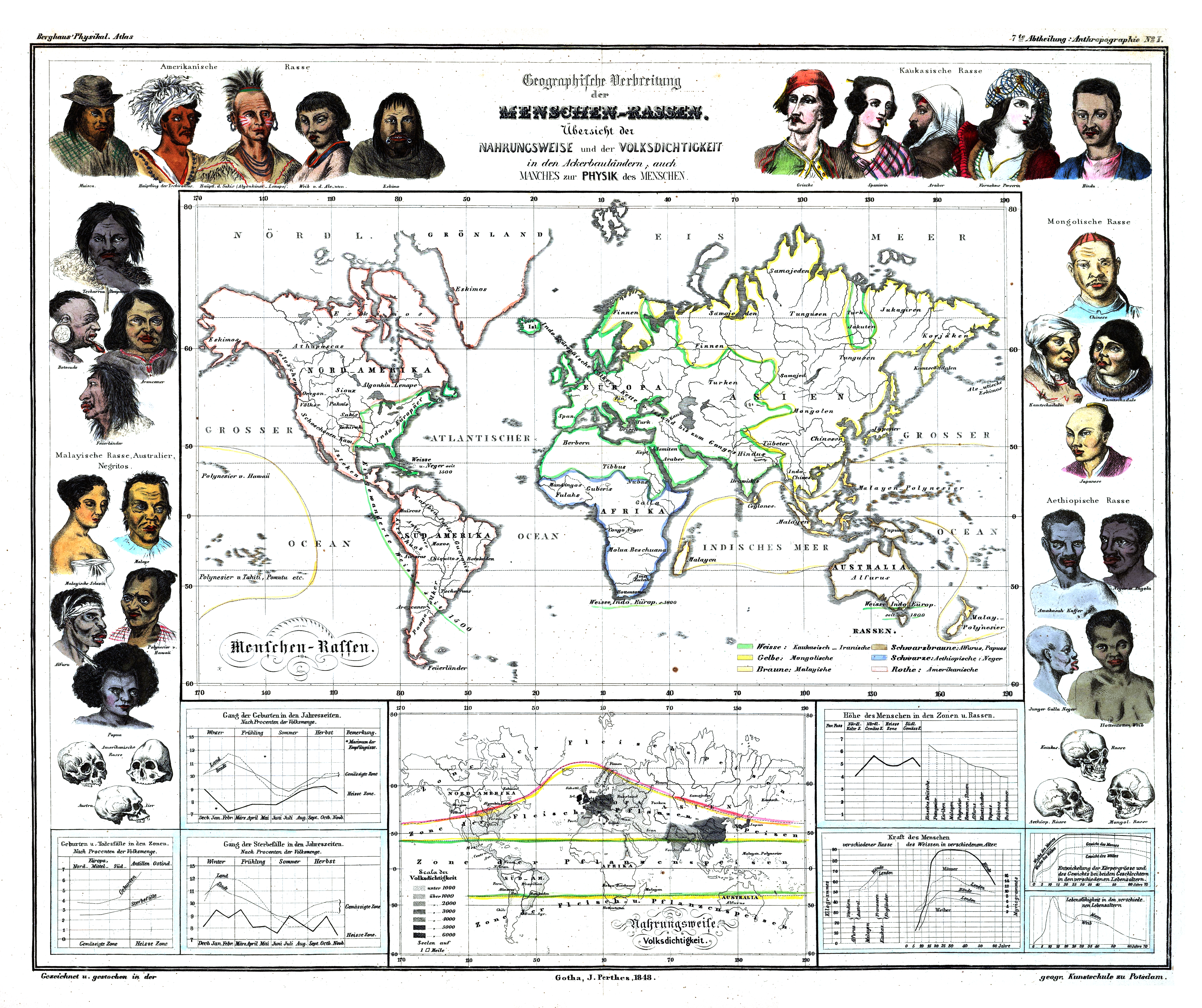
Map of human distribution

- Section I. Meteorology and Climatology (15 maps)
- Section II. Hydrology and Hydrography (16)
- Section III. Geology (15)
- Section IV. Telluric Magnetism (5)
- Section V. Geography of Botany (6)
- Section VI. Geography of Zoology (12)
- Section VII. Anthropology (4)
- Section VIII. Ethnography (19)

Berghaus's written works were numerous and important, including Allgemeine Länder- und Völkerkunde (Stuttgart, 1837–1840), Grundriss der Geographie in fünf Büchern (Berlin, 1842), Die Völker des Erdballs (Leipzig, 1845–1847), Was man von der Erde weiß (Berlin, 1856–1860), and various large works on Germany. In 1863 he published Briefwechsel mit Alexander von Humboldt (Leipzig).

In 1838, Berghaus became a correspondent, living abroad, of the Royal Institute of the Netherlands. When that institute became the Royal Netherlands Academy of Arts and Sciences in 1851 he became a foreign member.

Berghaus is the namesake of Berghaus Island, one of the islands of the Franz Josef Land Arctic archipelago.

== Works ==
Magazines and other literature edited with his participation

- Hertha (mit K. F. V. Hoffmann, 1825–1829)
- Annalen der Erd-, Völker- und Staatenkunde (Berlin 1830–43, 28 volumes)
- Almanach, den Freunden der Erdkunde gewidmet (vol. 1–3, Stuttgart 1837–39; vol. 4 and 5, Gotha 1840–41)
- Geographische Jahrbuch (vol. 1–4, Stuttgart 1850–1852; continued as Petermanns Geographische Mitteilungen).

Monographs (excerpt)

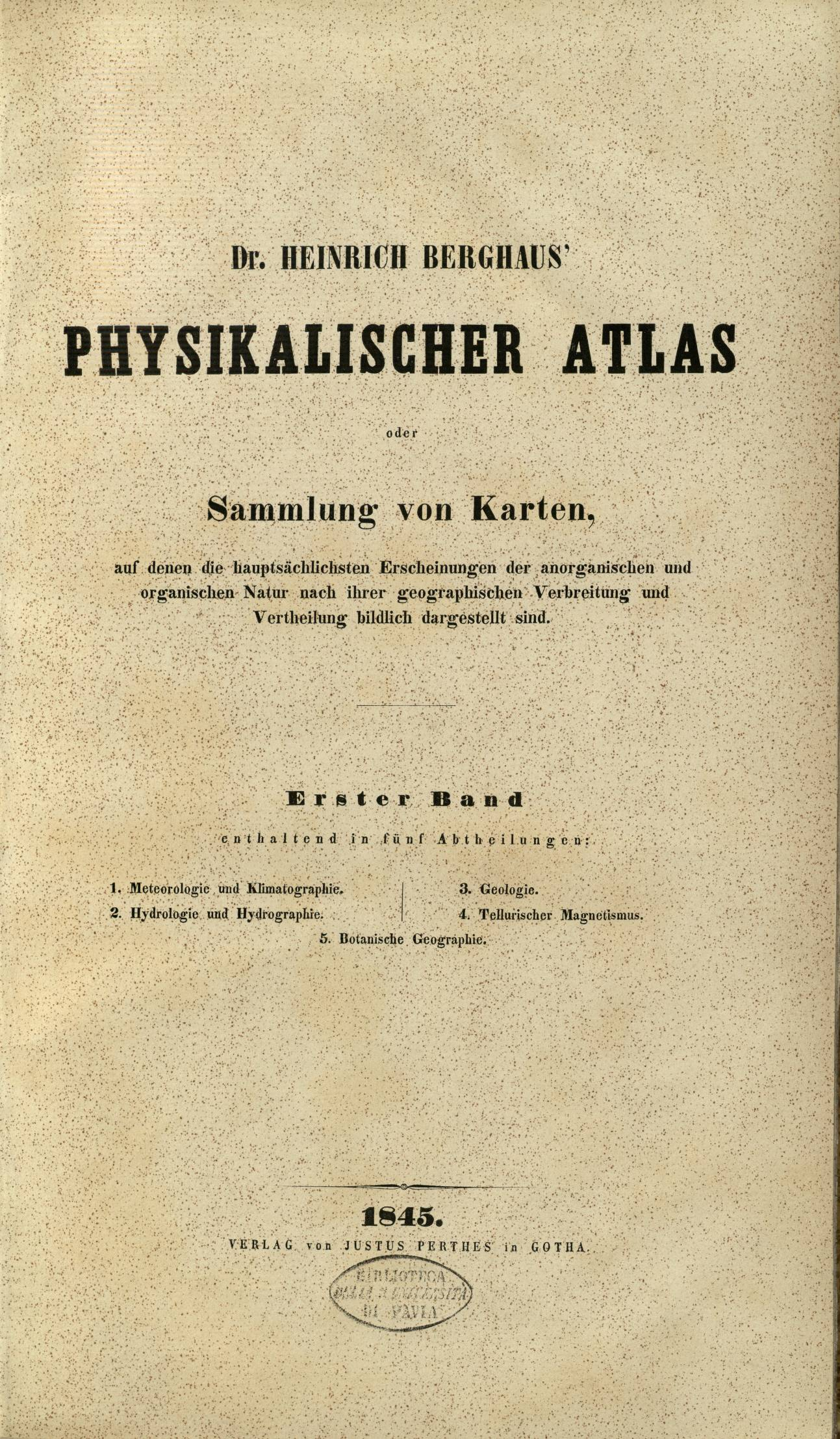
Physikalischer Atlas, 1845

- Allgemeine Länder- und Völkerkunde (Stuttgart 1837–40, 5 volumes)
- Grundriß der Geographie in fünf Büchern (Berlin 1842) online
- Physikalischer Atlas (in German). Gotha: Perthes. 1845.
  - Physikalischer Atlas (in German). Gotha: Perthes. 1848.
- Die Völker des Erdballs (Leipzig 1845–47, 2 volumes; new edition 1862)
- Die Grundlinien der Ethnographie (Stuttgart 1850, 2nd ed., 1856)
- Landbuch der Mark Brandenburg und des Markgraftums Niederlausitz (Brandenburg 1853–56, 3 volumes)
  - Vol. 1, VI + 684 pages, 1854, online,
  - Vol. 2, IX + 650 pages, 1855, online,
  - Vol. 3, VI + 783 pages, 1856, online + CVIII pages Register + Corrigenda.
- Was man von der Erde weiß (Berlin 1856–1860, 4 volumes)
- Deutschland seit hundert Jahren - Geschichte der Gebiets-Einteilung und der politischen Verfassung des Vaterlandes (Leipzig 1859–62, 5 volumes)
  - Part I: Deutschland vor hundert Jahren
    - Vol. 1: Leipzig 1859, 448 pages, online.
    - Vol 2: Leipzig 1860, 440 pages, online.
  - Part II: Deutschland vor fünfzig Jahren
    - Vol. 1: Zustände vom baierschen Erbfolge-Streit, 1778, bis zum Reichsdeputations-Receß, 1803. Leipzig 1861, VI + 406 pages. online
    - Vol. 2: (Entwicklungen von 1803 bis 1809). Leipzig 1861, IV + 412 pages, online
    - Vol. 3: (Entwicklungen von 1809 bis 1813). Leipzig 1862, IV + 426 pages, online.
- Wallfahrt durch's Leben ... (Berghaus' autobiografische Erinnerungen) Leipzig, 1862 (vol. 1 + 2) online, (Vol. 3 - 289 pages) online, (Vol. 4 - 236 pages) online, (Vol. 5 - 269 pages) online, (Vol. 6 - 228 pages) online, (Vol. 7 - 245 pages) online, (Vol. 8 - 230 pages) online, (Vol. 9 - 256 pages) online.
- Briefwechsel mit Alexander von Humboldt, 3 volumes (Leipzig 1863)
- Blücher als Mitglied der Pommerschen Ritterschaft 1777-1817 und beim Preußischen Heere am Rhein 1794. Anklam 1863, online
- Landbuch des Herzogtums Pommern - Schilderung der Zustände dieser Lande in der zweiten Hälfte des 19. Jahrhunderts (Anklam 1862–1868, 13 volumes), including:
  - Part II: Landbuch des Herzogtums Stettin, von Kammin und Hinterpommern; oder des Verwaltungsbezirks der Königlichen Regierung zu Stettin.
    - Vol. 1: Kreise Demmin, Anklam, Usedom-Wollin und Ueckermünde. Anklam 1865, 1094 pages, online.
    - Vol. 2: Randowscher Kreis und Allgemeines über die Kreise auf dem linken Oder-Ufer, Anklam 1865, online.
    - Vol. 3: Kreise Greifenhagen und Pyritz, Anklam 1868, online.
    - Vol. 4: Saatziger Kreis, insbesondere Stadt Stargard, Anklam 1867, online.
  - Part III: Landbuch des Herzogtums Kaschubien und der einverleibten Kreise der Neumark; oder des Verwaltungs-Bezirks der Königlichen Regierung zu Köslin westlicher Teil.
    - Vol. 1: Kreise Fürstentum Kammin und Belgard. Anklam 1867, online
  - Part IV: Landbuch von Neu-Vorpommern und der Insel Rügen, oder des Verwaltungs-Bezirks der Königlichen Regierung zu Stralsund.
    - Vol. 2 Greifswalder Kreis, Anklam 1868, 1232 pages, online.
- Geschichte der Stadt Stettin, der Hauptstadt von Pommern - Topographisch-statistisch beschrieben nach allen Richtungen ihres politischen, bürgerlichen, merkantilischen und kirchlichen Lebens (Berlin/Wriezen 1875–76, 2 volumes)
  - Vol. 1, 1102 pages
  - Vol 2, 1115 pages

Atlas

- Asia, Sammlung von Denkschriften in Beziehung auf die Geo- und Hydrographie dieses Erdtheils; zur Erklärung und Erläuterung seines Karten-Atlas zusammengetragen 1835. Map of Syria (No. 5 of Berghaus' Atlas of Asia): Karte von Syrien, den Manen Jacotin's und Burckhardt's gewidmet at the National Library of Israel.
