= Belaya Zemlya =

Group of three cold, glaciated islands in Franz Josef Land, Russia

Belaya Zemlya Hvidtenland
Russian: Белая Земля
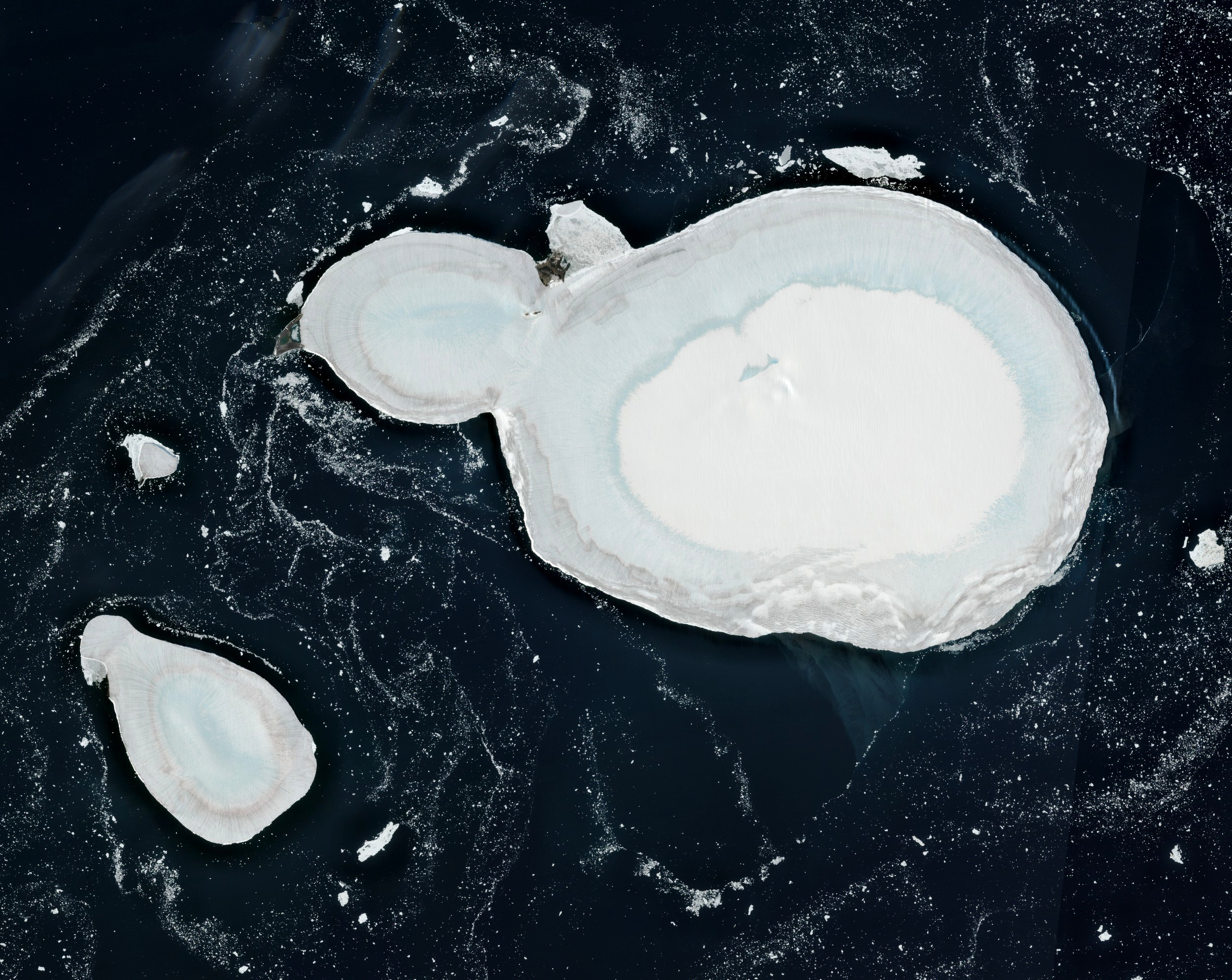
- Sentinel-2 image (2020)

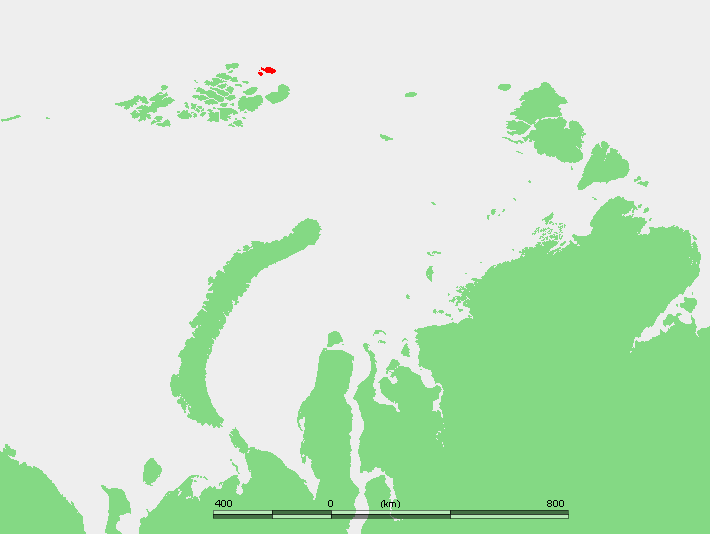
- Location of the Belaya Zemlya subgroup of the Franz Josef Archipelago

Geography
- Location: Arctic
- Coordinates: 81°38′N 63°06′E
- Archipelago: Franz Josef Archipelago

Administration
- Russia

Belaya Zemlya (Russian: Белая Земля, literally "White Land") is a group of three cold, glaciated islands. It is a geographical subgroup of Franz Josef Land, Russian Federation.

== History ==
This area was named Hvidtenland (Norwegian: "White Land") by Fridtjof Nansen, who reached this desolate place on August 5, 1895, during his polar expedition. In his map he drew four islands. Since the limit of permanent ice crosses Belaya Zemlya, it is often difficult to distinguish between land and sea. However, as the cartography of the Franz Josef Archipelago became more accurate, it became apparent that it was a group of three islands.

Belaya Zemlya is the point of the Franz Josef Archipelago that Valerian Albanov was trying to reach when he left the Svyataya Anna with part of the crew, but owing to the polar ice drift and the abundance of polynias along his route, he ended up far to the southwest in Alexandra Land.

== Geography ==
Belaya Zemlya is separated from the main Franz Josef group by a 45 km (28 mi) broad strait known as Proliv Severo-Vostochnyy. The strait running through Belaya Zemlya is called Proliv Sarsa, named after Michael Sars.

=== Islands ===
- Eva Island (Остров Ева-Лив), or "Eva-Liv Island", as it includes the Liv Peninsula. With 25 km (16 mi) in length, this is the largest island of the group. Eva Island was named after Fridtjof's wife Eva Nansen (died in 1907). The island is completely covered by two ice domes.
- Adelaide Island (Остров Аделаиды). Only 2 km (1.2 mi) in length, this is a very small island. It is located 5 km (3.1 mi) to the southwest of Eva Island's western end. Adelaide Island was named by Nansen, after his mother Adelaide Wedel-Jarlsberg.
- Freeden Island (Остров Фреден), sometimes also spelt "Fryeden" because of the transliteration from the Russian. This is a larger oval-shaped island, with a length of 8.2 km (5.1 mi). It lies 2.5 km (1.6 mi) south of Adelaide Island. Freeden Island was named by Julius Payer after Wilhelm von Freeden.

== See also ==
- Geography of Franz Josef Land
- List of islands of Russia
