= Kane Island =

Island in Franz Josef Land, Arkhangelsk Oblast, Russian Arctic

Остров Кейна
- Kane Island, within the Zichy Land islands

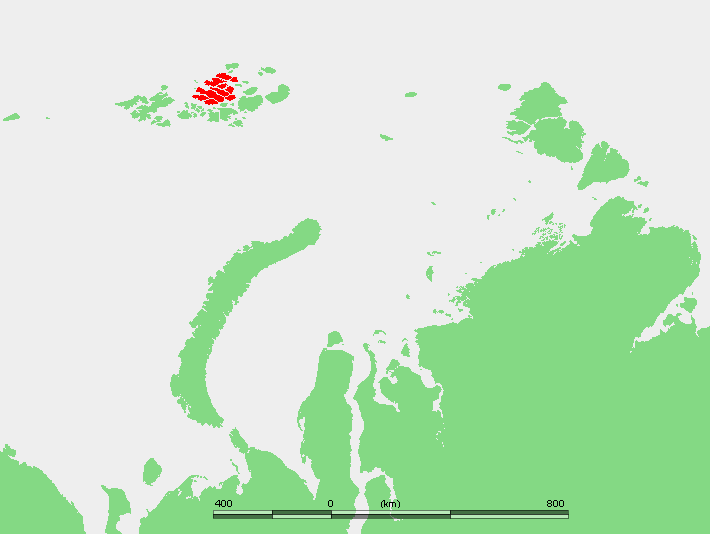
- Location of the Zichy Land subgroup of the Franz Josef Archipelago. Kane Island is located towards its eastern side.

Geography
- Location: Arctic
- Coordinates: 81°04′35″N 58°38′53″E
- Archipelago: Franz Josef Archipelago
- Area: 23.2 km^{2} (9.0 sq mi)
- Highest elevation: 282 m (925 ft)

Administration
- Russia

Demographics
- Population: 0

Kane Island (Russian: Остров Кейна; Ostrov Keyna) is an island in Franz Josef Land, Arkhangelsk Oblast, Russian Arctic.

== Geography ==
The largely unglacierised Kane island has a maximum altitude of 282 m (925 ft). It is about 5.8 km (3.6 mi) in length, measured from north to south. The northeastern tip is called Cape Hellwald (Russian: мыс Гельвальда) while Cape Easter (Russian: мыс Пасхи) is in the southeast.

The island is located on the eastern side of the central Zichy Land group within Franz Josef Land. Kuhn Island and the small Brosch Island are situated about 1.5 km (0.9 mi) to the northwest of Kane Island. All three islands are separated from the larger Greely Island to the southwest by the Sternek Strait (Russian: пролив Штернека).

== History ==
The island was discovered by the Austro-Hungarian North Pole expedition. They first reached Cape Easter on 5 April 1874, Easter Sunday, during the second of Julius Payer's sledge journeys. On the return journey from their northward trip, Payer climbed Cape Hellwald on 17 April, where he ascertained that the land in question was an island. He named the island after American Arctic explorer Dr. Elisha Kent Kane. Cape Hellwald was named after Austrian journalist Friedrich von Hellwald who had written several articles about the expedition.

== See also ==
- Franz Josef Land
- List of islands of Russia
