= Zichy Land =

Geographical subgroup of Franz Josef Land, Arkhangelsk Oblast, Russia

Земля Зичи
- Zichy Land islands to the south of Rudolf Island.

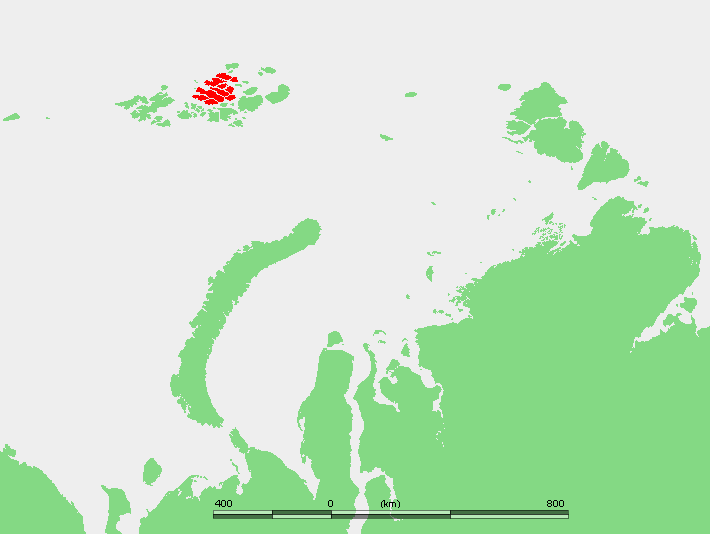
- Location of the Zichy Land subgroup of the Franz Josef Archipelago.

Geography
- Location: Arctic
- Coordinates: 81°00′N 56°00′E
- Archipelago: Franz Josef Archipelago
- Total islands: 22
- Major islands: Salisbury Island, Jackson Island
- Highest elevation: 620 m (2030 ft)
- Highest point: Peak Parnass

Administration
- Russian Federation

Demographics
- Population: 0

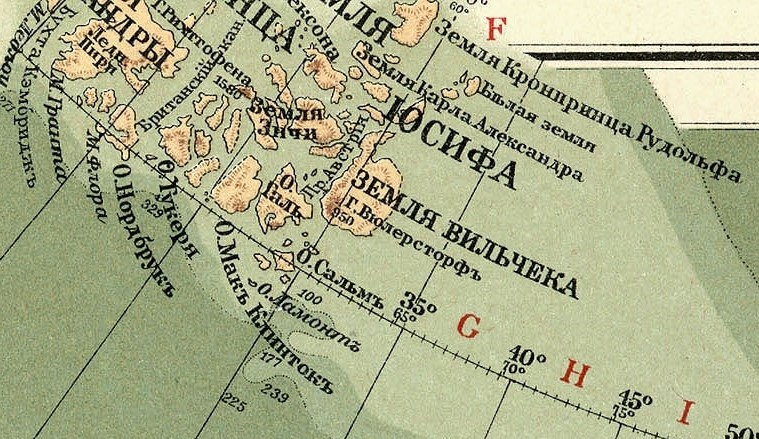
Zemlya Zichy in the central position of Franz Josef Land in the corner of a ca 1902 Yeniseysk Governorate map.

Zichy Land (Russian: Земля Зичи; Zemlya Zichy) is a geographical subgroup of Franz Josef Land, Arkhangelsk Oblast, Russia. It is formed by the central cluster of large islands in the midst of the archipelago. The islands are separated from each other by narrow sounds that are frozen most of the year, forming a compact whole.

This island group was named after Hungarian Count Ödön Zichy (1811-1894) who was, beside Count Johann Nepomuk Wilczek, the second highest sponsor for the Austro-Hungarian North Pole Expedition to Franz Josef Land.

== Geography ==
The broad channel to the southwest of Zichy Land is known as Markham Sound or Markham Channel (Russian: Пролив маркама; Proliv Markama), after the British polar explorer Admiral Sir Albert Hastings Markham.

The northernmost point of Zichy Land is Cape Bema on Karl-Alexander Island and its southernmost point is Cape Fiume on Champ Island. The distance between the two comprises 114 kilometres (71 miles). Cape Armitidzh in Luigi Island is the westernmost point of the subgroup. The highest point is 620 metres (2,034 feet) high Peak Parnass located on Wiener Neustadt Island. The channels separating the islands in the southeastern area of the group are very narrow.

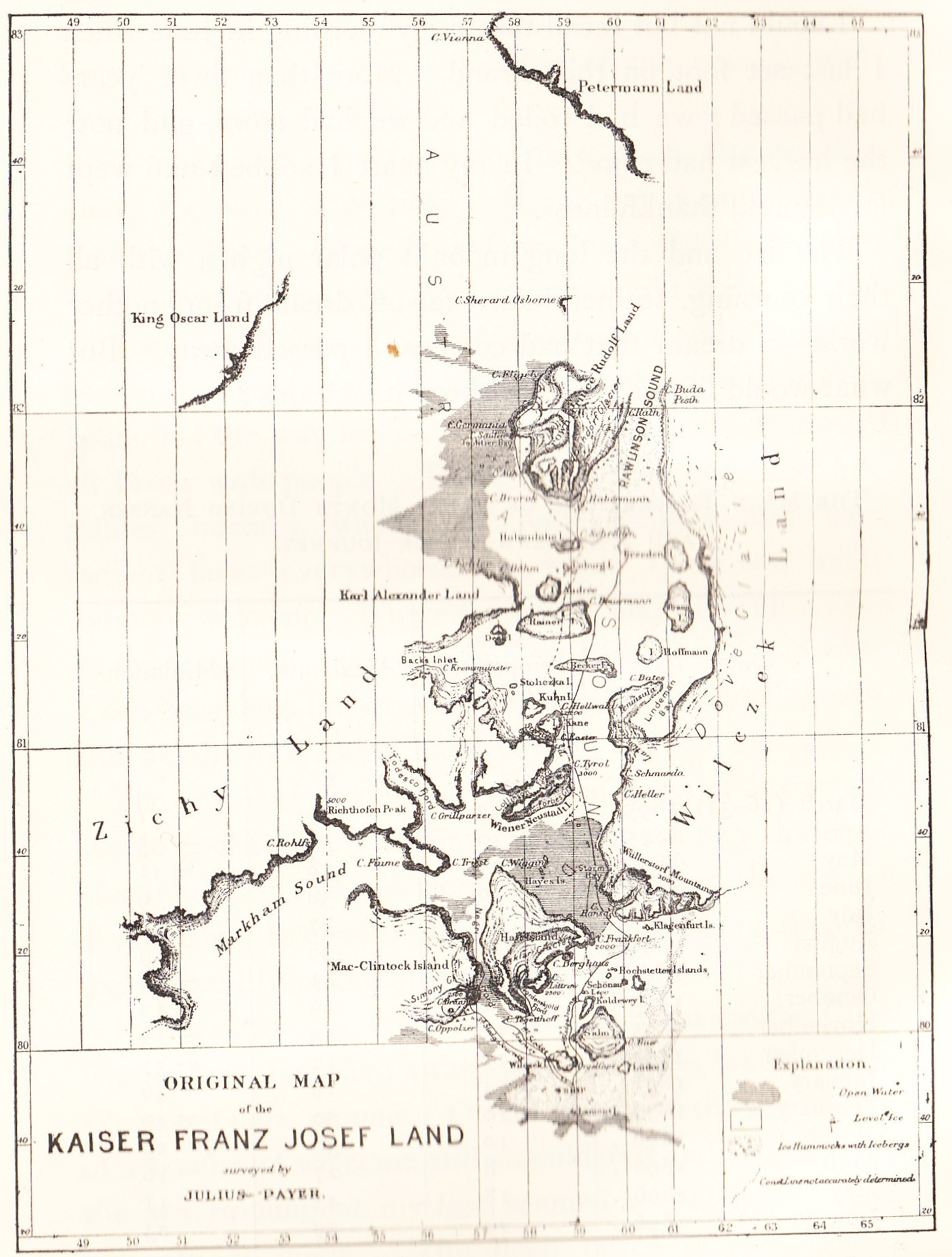
Zichy Land in an 1874 Franz Josef Land map by Julius Payer.

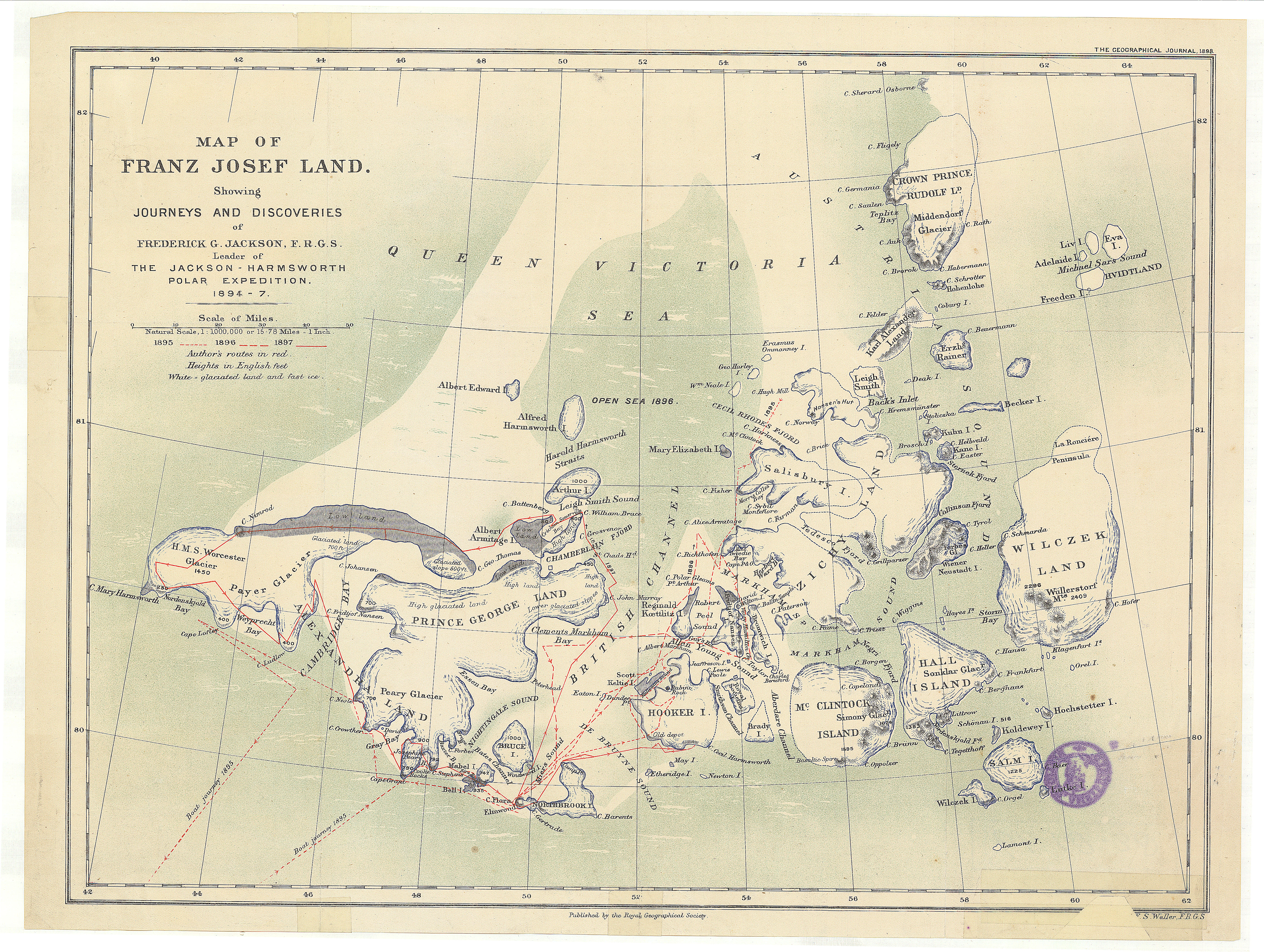
Zichy Land in an 1898 map of Frederick G. Jackson's explorations showing already separate islands.

=== Islands ===
The individual islands forming the Zemlya Zichy archipelago are (from North to south):

- Karl-Alexander Island
- Rainer Island
- Jackson Island
- Payer Island
- Greely Island
- Brosch Island (Kuna Island)
- Kane Island
- Ziegler Island
- Salisbury Island
- Wiener Neustadt Island
- Luigi Island
- Champ Island

== See also ==
- Geography of Franz Josef Land
- List of islands of Russia
