= Schönau Island =

Island in Russia

Native name: Остров Шёнау
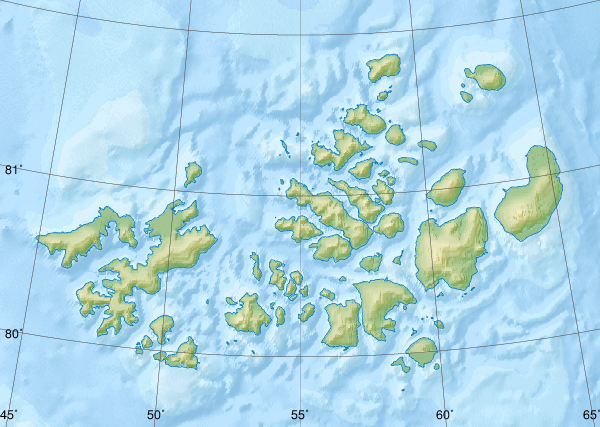

Geography
- Location: Franz Josef Land
- Coordinates: 80°09′09″N 59°05′42″E

Administration
- Russia
- Oblast: Arkhangelsk Oblast

Demographics
- Population: 0

Schönau Island (Russian: Остров Шёнау, romanized: Ostrov Shyonau) is an island in Franz Josef Land, Russia.

== Geography ==
This island lies off Koldewey Island's northern point in the Lavrov Sound opposite to Hall Island and Berghaus Island. It is only 90 m across.

Schönau Island Island is named after the town of Teplitz-Schönau (now Teplice, Czech Republic), the birthplace of Austro-Hungarian arctic explorer Julius Payer, who made the discovery of Franz Josef Land in the late 19th century when he led, as a Commander at Shore, the Austro-Hungarian North Pole Expedition together with Karl Weyprecht, who was Commander at Sea.
