= Adelaide Island (Russia) =

Island in Russia

Adelaide
Russian: остров Аделаиды
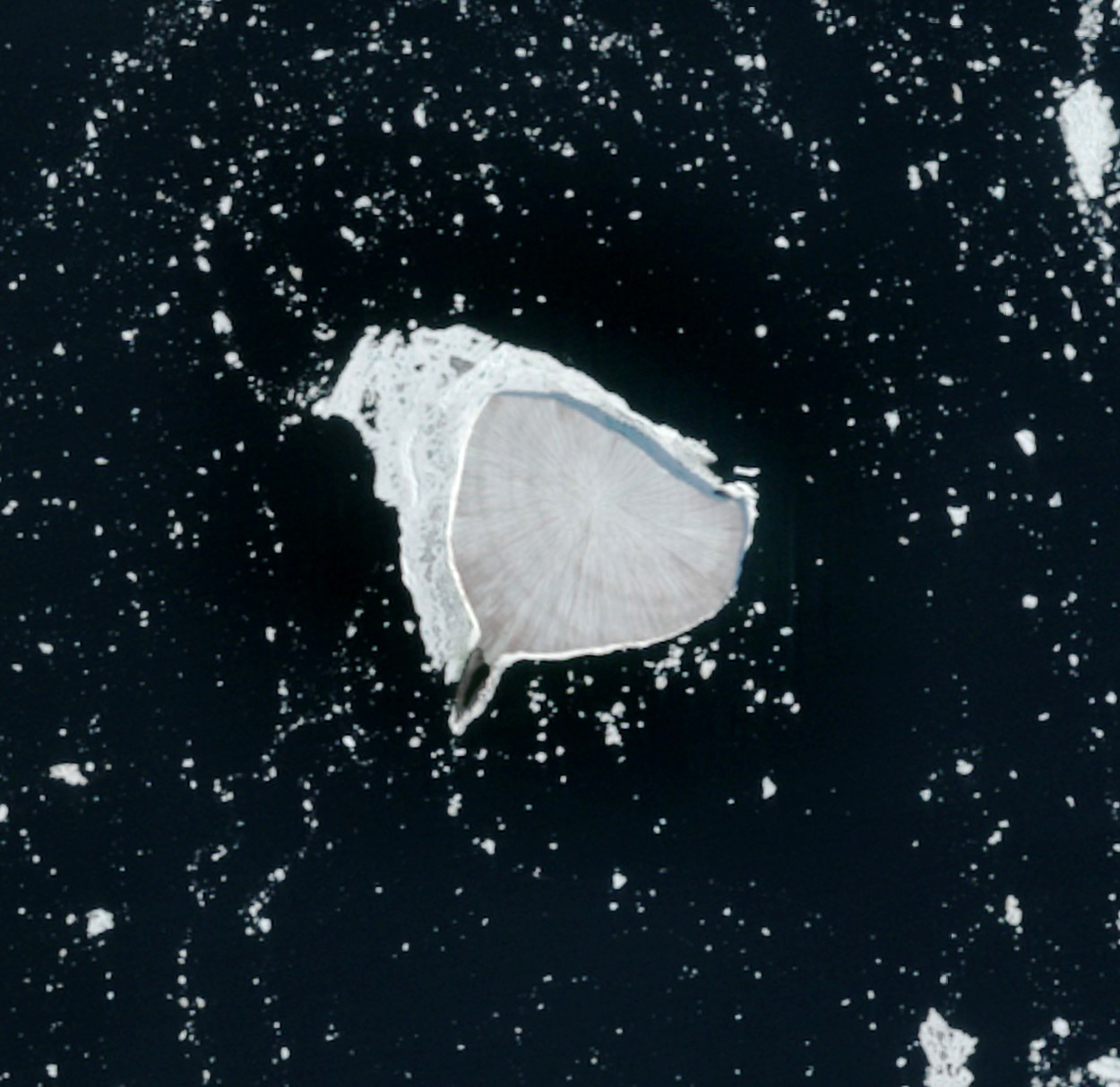
- Sentinel-2 image (2020)

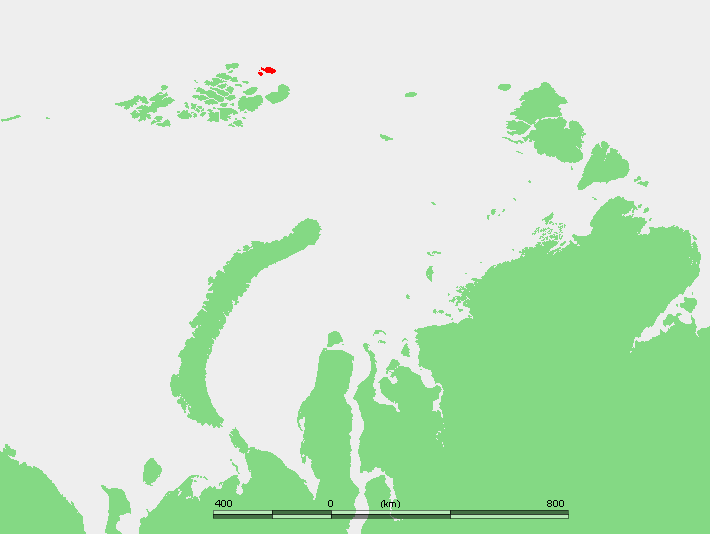
- Location of Belaya Zemlya in the Kara Sea

Geography
- Location: Russian Arctic
- Coordinates: 81°37′31.70″N 61°55′46.11″E
- Archipelago: Franz Josef Land
- Highest elevation: 48 m (157 ft)

Administration
- Russia

Demographics
- Population: 0

Adelaide Island (Russian: остров Аделаиды) is an island located in Franz Josef Land, Russian Federation, in the north-east of the archipelago, which lies in the Kara Sea. The highest point of the island is 48 metres (157 ft).

It is one of three glaciated islands that comprise Belaya Zemlya, a geographical subgroup of the Franz Josef archipelago.

Yeva-Liv Island lies 3.5 kilometres (2.2 mi) to the northeast.

Adelaide Island was discovered by Fridtjof Nansen and Hjalmar Johansen on 9 August 1895 on their return journey from an attempt to reach the North Pole. Nansen named the island after his mother Adelaide Johanne Thekla Isidore Wedel-Jarlsberg.

== See also ==
- List of islands of Russia
