= Alger Island, Russia =

Island in Franz Josef Land, Russia

Alger Island
Russian: Остров Алджер
- Location within Russia

Geography
- Location: Arctic
- Coordinates: 80°23′N 56°00′E
- Archipelago: Franz Josef Archipelago
- Length: 10 km (6 mi)
- Width: 4.7 km (2.92 mi)
- Highest elevation: 429 m (1407 ft)
- Highest point: Kupol Vostok Pervyy

Administration
- Russia

Demographics
- Population: 0

Alger Island (Russian: Остров Алджер; Ostrov Aldzher) is an island in Franz Josef Land, Russia. Lat 80° 22′ N, long 56° 03′ E.

== Geography ==
The length of Alger Island is 10 km (6.2 mi) and its maximum width 4.7 km (2.9 mi). Its highest point is the 429 m (1,407 ft) high summit of the Kupol Vostok Pervyy (Купол Восток Первый) ice dome that covers part of the island. There are wide unglaciated areas on the northern and the southwestern shores.

Alger Island is located north of McClintock Island, separated from it by a 2 km (1.2 mi) narrow sound.

Off Alger Island's southwestern shores lies Ostrov Matil'dy (Остров Матильды), a very small, barely 1 km (0.62 mi) long, island.

== History ==
The island was discovered in 1899 by Walter Wellman on board the Capella. He named it after U.S. Secretary of War Russell A. Alger who had donated $250 to Wellman's expedition.

The wintering site of the 1901 failed American Baldwin-Ziegler North Pole Expedition was on Alger Island.

== See also ==
- List of islands of Russia
- List of glaciers in Russia
