= Koldewey =

Koldewey may refer to:

- Koldewey Island, an island in Franz Josef Land, Russia
- Store Koldewey, an island in northeastern Greenland
- 11352 Koldewey, an asteroid

== People ==
- Carl Koldewey, German Arctic explorer
- Heather Koldewey, British marine scientist and environmentalist
- Robert Koldewey, German architect and archaeologist known for excavating Babylon
