= Koldewey Island =

Island in Russia

Native name: остров Кольдевея
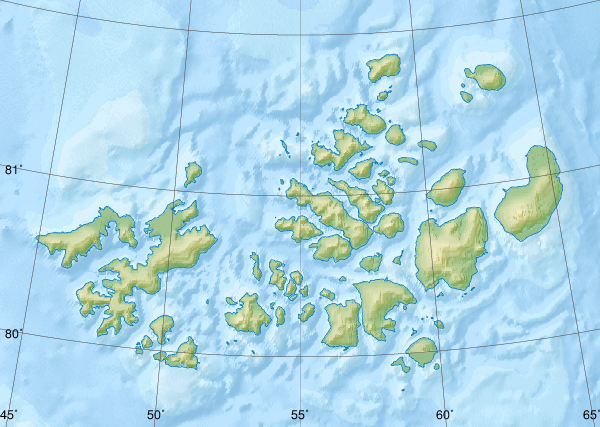

Geography
- Location: Franz Josef Land
- Coordinates: 80°08′N 59°10′E
- Highest elevation: 66 m (217 ft)

Administration
- Russia
- Oblast: Arkhangelsk Oblast

Demographics
- Population: 0

Koldewey Island (Russian: остров Кольдевея, ostrov Kol'deveya) is an island in Franz Josef Land, Russia.

== Geography ==
The island is 3.7 kilometres (2.3 mi) in length. Its highest point is 66 metres (217 ft) (temporarily named as Mountain of Carl-Christian). On the top there is a double peak stack 6 metres (20 ft) high. The second-highest point Mountain of Robert-Johann in the southwest is named after Carl Koldewey's son Robert Koldewey. The island has no lakes but its single valley has a creek in the summer.

The island belongs to the Russkaya Arktika National Park since 15 June 2009. There is the same arctic climate and flora as the "mother" island Salm but Koldewey is fully unglacierized. The sound between both islands is about 200 metres (660 ft) deep. The island extends in two directions: in the north more dynamically with a longish steep cape and small islet Schoenau at the end, in the southwest very shallow, long flat bar cape with over 6 km (4 mi) underwater reef not deeper as 35 metres (115 ft), that connects with the glacierized side of the Salm Island. The middle peak of the large bank (temporarily named Siegfried-Elof Bar) reaches just a meter and a half under the surface and lies in the Lavrov Sound 12 km (7 mi) opposite to the famous Cape Tegethoff on Hall Island.

Koldewey Island is named after Captain Carl Koldewey, leader of the second German expedition to Greenland and Spitzbergen in the late 19th century.

== Adjacent islands ==
Very close to Koldewey Island, off its northern point, lies one of the smallest islands:

- Schönau Island, Ostrov Shœnau (Russian: Остров Шёнау) lies in the Lavrov Sound opposite to the Hall and Berghaus Islands. It is only 90 m across.
