= Greely Island =

Island in Franz Josef Land, Arkhangelsk Oblast, Russia

- Greely Island, within the Zichy Land islands

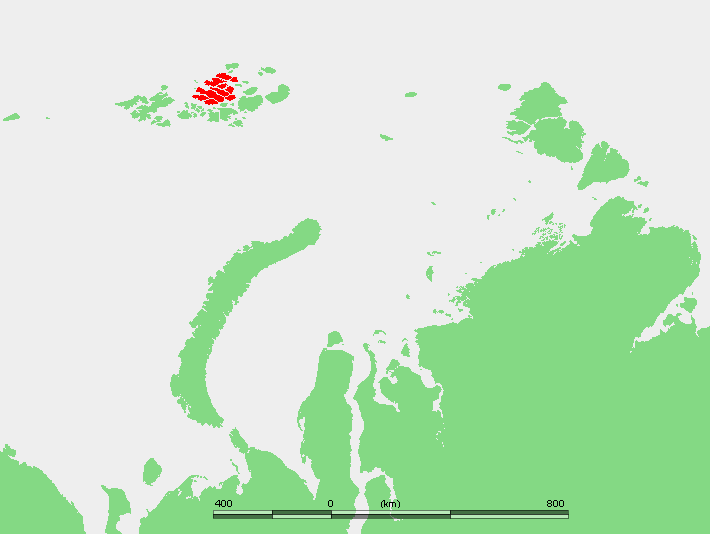
- Location of the Zichy Land subgroup of the Franz Josef Archipelago. Greely Island is located towards its eastern side.

Geography
- Location: Arctic
- Coordinates: 81.0044°N 58.2978°E
- Archipelago: Franz Josef Archipelago
- Area: 149 km^{2} (58 sq mi)
- Highest elevation: 447 m (1467 ft)

Administration
- Russia

Demographics
- Population: 0

Greely Island (Russian: Остров Грили; Ostrov Grili) is an island in Franz Josef Land, Arkhangelsk Oblast, Russia.

This island was named after American Arctic explorer Adolphus Greely.

== Geography ==
Greely Island's area is 127 km^{2} (49 sq mi) and it is almost completely glacierized.

Greely Island is part of the Zichy Land subgroup of the Franz Josef Archipelago. It is separated from Ziegler Island by a narrow sound.

=== Adjacent Islands ===
==== Kuhn Island ====
Kuhn Island (Russian: Остров Куна, Ostrov Kuna) is a large island with unglacierized shores lying off Greely Island's northern coastline. It has a maximum height of 228 m (748 ft).

==== Brosch Island ====
Just south of Kuhn Island lies the small Brosch Island (Russian: Остров Брош, Ostrov Brosh) with a maximum height of 85 m (279 ft). This island was named after Gustav Brosch, a naval lieutenant from Bohemia in the Austro-Hungarian North Pole Expedition.

==== Kane Island ====
Kane Island (Russian: Остров Кейна, Ostrov Keyna) is another large partly unglacierized island lying off Greely Island's northeastern shore, southeast of Kuhn Island and separated from it by a 2 km (1.2 mi) narrow sound. It has a maximum height of 282 m (925 ft). Kane Island was named after American Arctic explorer Dr. Elisha Kent Kane.

== View ==
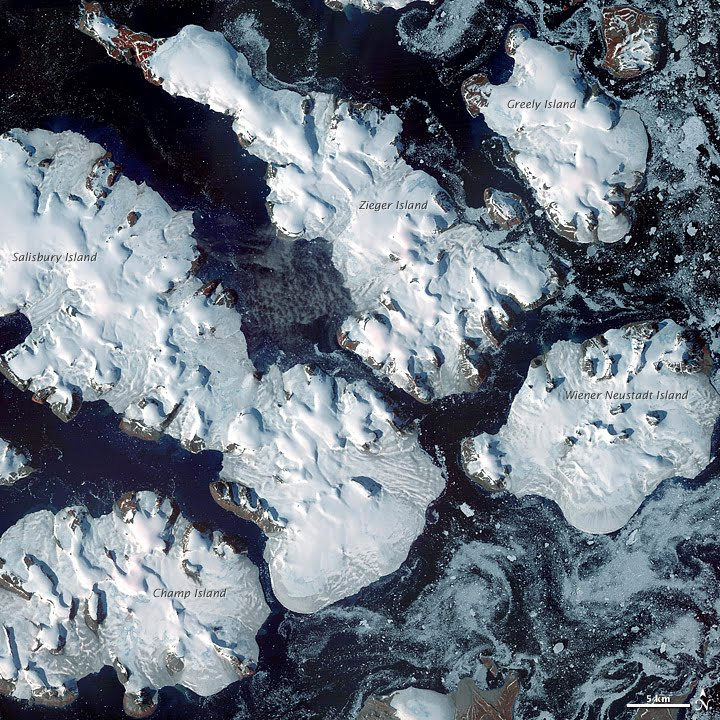
Various islands of Franz Josef Land

== See also ==
- Franz Josef Land
- List of islands of Russia
