= Hall Island (Arctic) =

Island of the Russian Arctic archipelago

Native name: Остров Галля (Russian)
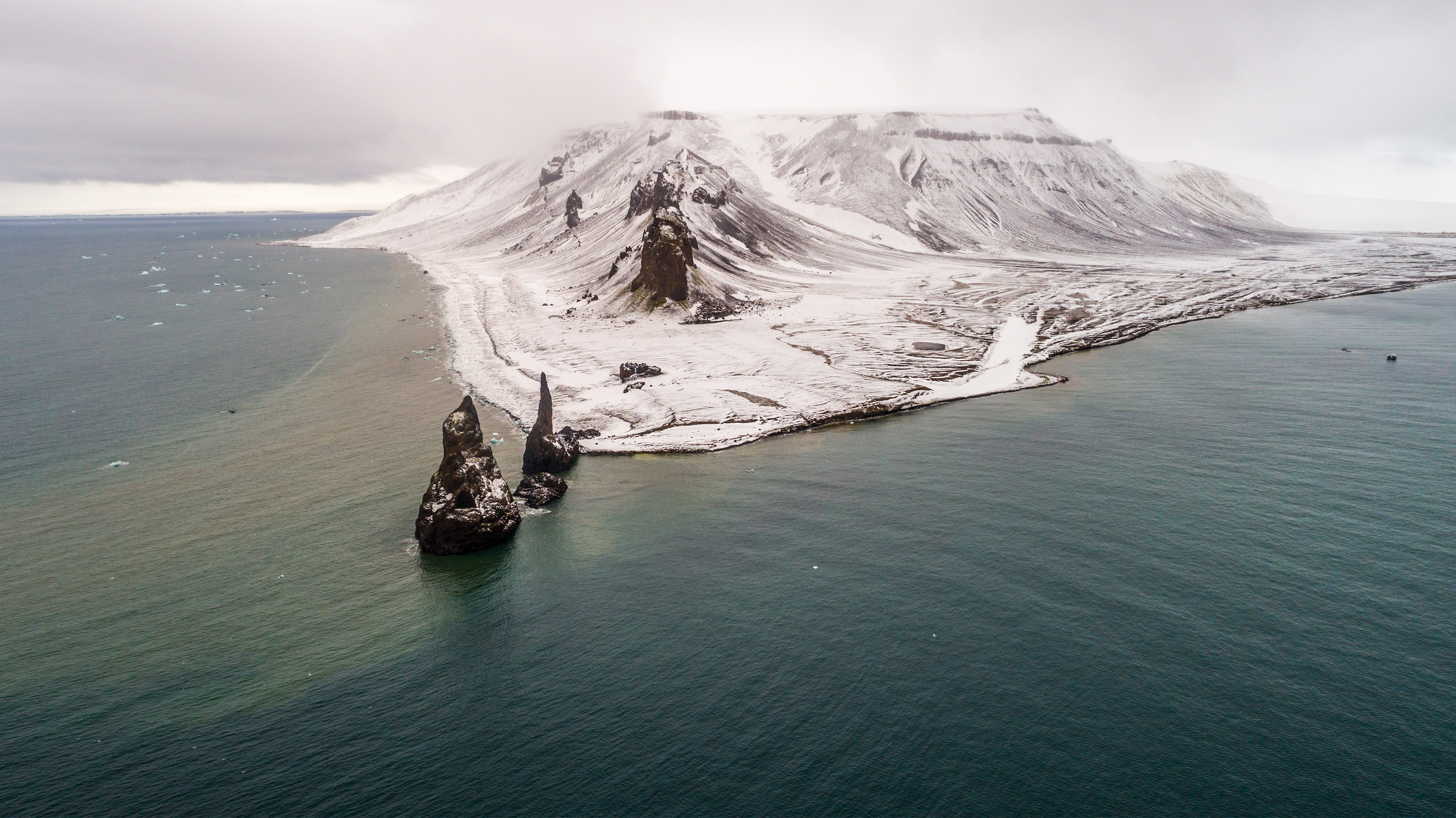

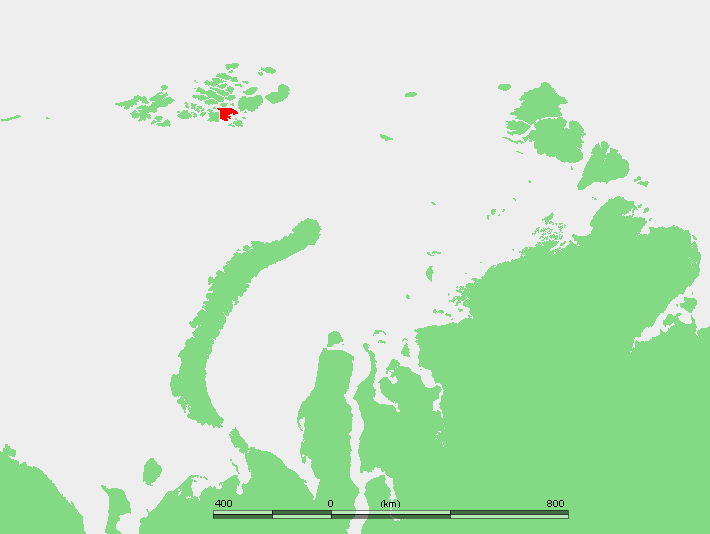
- Etymology: Charles Francis Hall

Geography
- Location: Arctic Ocean
- Coordinates: 80°21′23″N 57°43′52″E
- Archipelago: Franz Josef Land
- Adjacent to: Austrian Strait; Markham Sound
- Area: 1,049 km^{2} (405 sq mi)
- Area rank: 314th
- Coastline: 174.7 km (108.55 mi)
- Highest elevation: 502 m (1647 ft)
- Highest point: Kupol Moskvy

Administration
- Russia
- Federal subject: Arkhangelsk Oblast
- Administrative district: Primorsky District

Demographics
- Population: 0 (2026)

Hall Island (Russian: Остров Галля; Ostrov Gallya) is an island of the Russian Arctic archipelago of Franz Josef Land.

== History ==
Hall Island was discovered on 30 August 1873, by the Austro-Hungarian North Pole expedition, and named after American Arctic explorer Charles Francis Hall. It was the first island of the Franz Josef group that the expedition discovered and, after the smaller Wilczeck Island, the first major island on which they set foot.

A small camp was built at Cape Tegetthoff in 1898 by the Walter Wellman expedition. It contains a marker commemorating the discovery of the archipelago. Cape Tegetthoff was named after the main ship of the Austro-Hungarian explorers, which had been named in honor of Austrian admiral Wilhelm von Tegetthoff.

== Geography ==
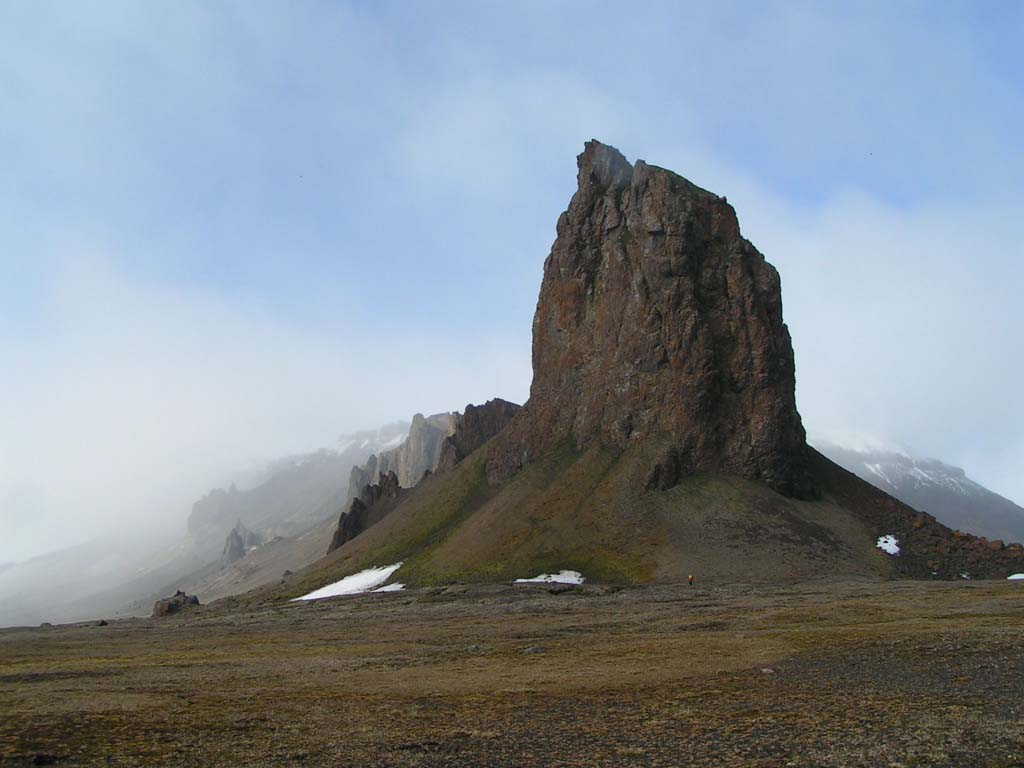
Cape Tegetthoff

Hall Island is almost completely covered by glaciers. Its highest point is 502 m (1,647 ft) and it is the summit of the Kupol Moskvy ice dome that covers the central part of the island. Besides the ice dome there is a glacier with its terminus in the southern shore, the Sonklar Glacier.

The only relatively large areas free of permanent ice are located at its southern end, where there are two headlands: Cape Tegetthoff, and also Cape Ozyornyy, on Littrov Peninsula. There is also a very small unglaciated area around its eastern cape, Mys Frankfurt, and another at its northwestern point, Cape Wiggins. Hall Island's area is 1,049 km^{2} (405 sq mi) and it is one of the largest islands in the group. There is a wide bay on the southeastern side of Hall Island known as Hydrographer Bay and a smaller one west of the Littrov Peninsula called Bukhta Surovaya.

Hall Island is located very close to the eastern shores of McClintock Island, separated from it by a narrow sound. To the southeast there is a wider strait separating Hall Island from Salm Island, known in Russian as Proliv Lavrova. The strait to the east is the large Austrian Strait.

=== Adjacent minor islands ===
Berghaus Island
Located 1 1/2 kilometres (1 mi) northeast off Hall Island's eastern bay. The island is small but steep and unglaciated, with its highest point at 372 m (1,220 ft). It is named after German geographer Heinrich Berghaus.
Brownian Islands
Comprising three small islands off Hall Island's northern shore, this group of islands is named after Russian geographer and meteorologist Peter Ivanovich Brownov.
Newcomb Island
Located 6 kilometres (4 mi) west of Hall Island's northwestern cape. The island is 5-kilometre-long (3 mi), oval-shaped and unglaciated, with its highest point at 67 m (220 ft). It is named after Canadian-American polymath Simon Newcomb.

Additionally, in August 2019, a geographic expedition by the Russian Northern Fleet to Franz Josef Land and Novaya Zemlya discovered a new island, previously thought to be a peninsula of Hall Island.

== See also ==
- List of islands of Russia
