= Rainer Island =

Island in Franz Josef Land, Russia

Russian: Остров Райнера
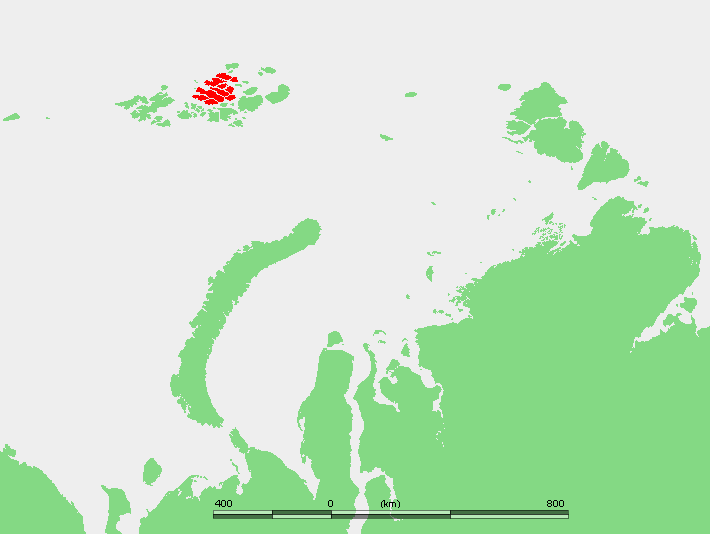
- View of the Zemlya Zichy subgroup of the Franz Josef Archipelago. Rainer Island is on its northeastern side.

Geography
- Location: Arctic
- Coordinates: 81.3586°N 58.9914°E
- Archipelago: Franz Josef Archipelago
- Area: 139.8 km^{2} (54.0 sq mi)
- Length: 14 km (8.7 mi)
- Width: 14 km (8.7 mi)
- Highest elevation: 284 m (932 ft)
- Highest point: Kupol Vostok Vtoroy

Administration
- Russia

Demographics
- Population: 0

Rainer Island or Rainier Island (Остров Райнера; Ostrov Raynyera) is an island in Franz Josef Land, Russia. Lat. 81° 42' N; long 59° 00' E.

== Geography ==
Rainer Island has a roughly round shape, with a diameter of 14 km (8.7 mi). Its area is 140 km^{2} (54 sq mi) and practically all of it is glaciated. Its highest point is 284 m (932 ft) and it is the summit of the Kupol Vostok Vtoroy (Купол Восток Второй) ice dome that covers the central part of the island.

This island was named by the Austro-Hungarian North Pole Expedition after nobleman Rainer Joseph Johann Michael Franz Hieronymus, Archduke of Austria, Prince Royal of Hungary and Bohemia, also known as the Archduke Rainer of Austria, one of the aristocrats who helped to finance the private venture.

Rainer Island is part of the Zemlya Zichy subgroup of the Franz Joseph Archipelago. It is located east of Karl-Alexander Island and very close to it, separated by a 2.5 km (1.6 mi) narrow sound.

== Adjacent islands ==
- At the northern end of the sound between Rainer Island and Karl-Alexander Island there is a group of islets known as Lesgaft Reefs (рифы Лесгафта). These were named after Russian social reformer Peter Lesgaft.
- Close to the northeastern shore of Rainer Island there is a small islet called Ostrov Ivanova which is only 0.6 km (0.37 mi) in length.

== See also ==
- List of islands of Russia
