= Karl-Alexander Island =

Island in Franz Josef Land, Russia

Russian: Остров Карла-Александра
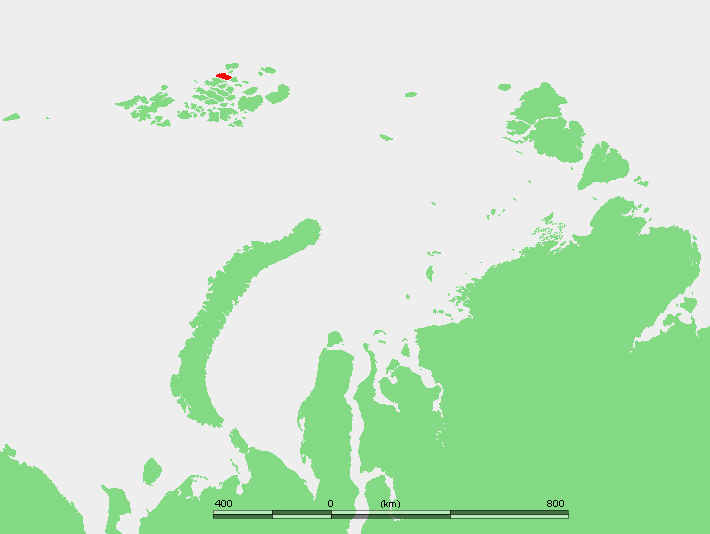
- Location of Karl Alexander Island in the Franz Josef Archipelago

Geography
- Location: Arctic
- Coordinates: 81.37°N 57.34°E
- Archipelago: Franz Josef Archipelago
- Area: 329 km^{2} (127 sq mi)
- Length: 29 km (18 mi)
- Width: 18 km (11.2 mi)
- Highest elevation: 365 m (1198 ft)

Administration
- Russian Federation

Demographics
- Population: 0

Karl Alexander Island (Russian: Остров Карла-Александра), also known as Zemlya Karla-Alexandra (Земля Карла Александра), is an island in Franz Josef Land, Russia.

== Geography ==
Karl Alexander Island's length is 29 km (18 mi) and its maximum width is 18 km (11.2 mi). Its area is 329 km^{2} (127 sq mi), but very little of it is ice-free. The highest point on the island is 365 m (1,198 ft). The southern section of the island is covered by an ice dome named Kupol Samoylovicha (Купол Самойловича).

This island is part of the Zemlya Zichy subgroup of the Franz Joseph Archipelago. It is separated from Rainer Island in the east by a 2.5 km (1.6 mi) narrow sound and from Jackson Island in the South by a 6 km (3.7 mi) wide sound.

Karl Alexander Island was named by the Austro-Hungarian North Pole Expedition after one of the noblemen that financed the venture, Charles Alexander, Grand Duke of Saxe-Weimar-Eisenach.

This island should not be confused with Alexandra Land, also in the Franz Josef Archipelago.

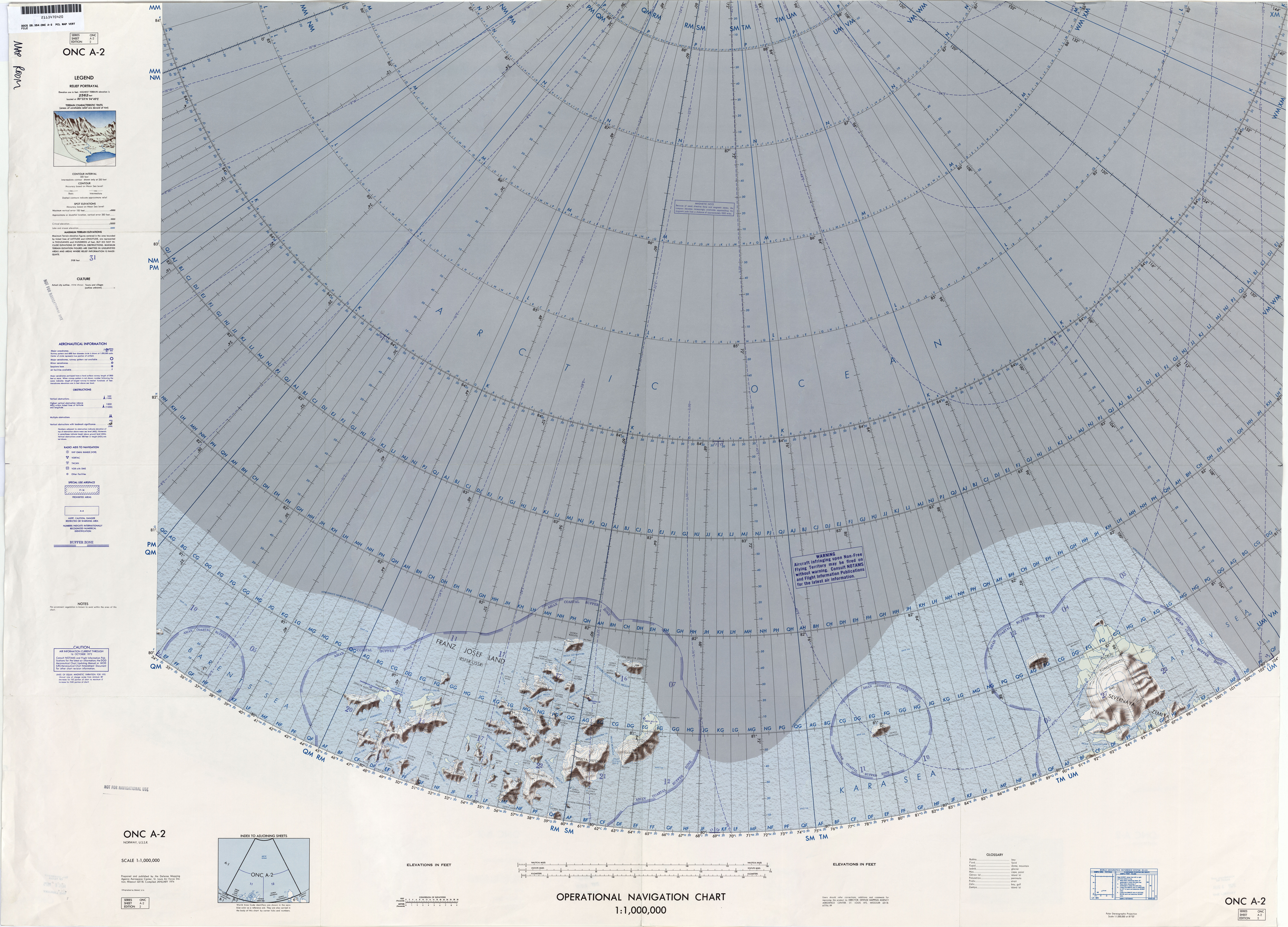
Map of the Arctic Ocean showing Franz Josef Land and northern Severnaya Zemlya

== Adjacent islands ==
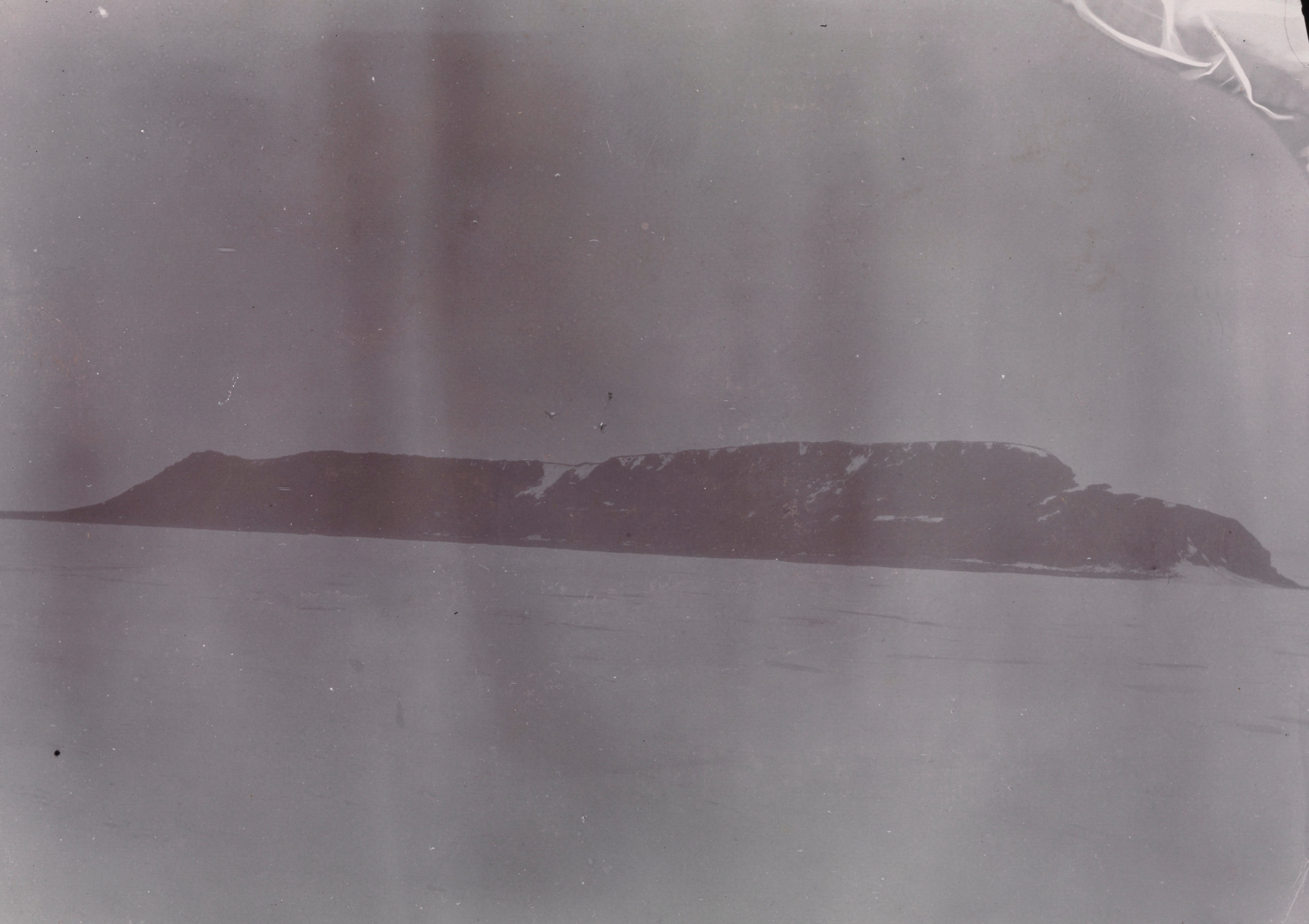
Torup Island

- Off Karl Alexander Island's northwestern point lie the Chichagov Islands (Острова чичагова; Ostrova Chichagova). These islands were named after Arctic explorer Pavel Vasilievich Chichagov (1767-1848), the son of Admiral Vasili Yakovlevich Chichagov of the Russian Navy.
- To the west of Karl Alexander Island's southwestern point lie the Pontremoli Islands (Острова Понтремоли; Ostrova Pontremoli), at lat 81° 24' N; long 56° 27' E. They are named after Prof. Aldo Pontremoli, professor of physics at the University of Milan, who died during the Umberto Nobile Polar expedition with the Dirigibile ITALIA in 1928. It was just Umberto Nobile who suggested to name them after prof. Pontremoli, during an expedition in that area in 1931 with the icebreaker ship Malyghin.

There are four small islets off Karl Alexander Island's northeastern shores:

- The largest one is called Torup Island (Остров Торупа; Ostrov Torup), located at lat 81° 31' N; long 58° 27' E . It is named after Sophus Torup (1861-1937) professor of physiology and friend of Fridtjof Nansen
- Ostrov Solov'yëva is located at lat 81° 31' N; long 58° 23' E.
- Northeast of Torup Island lies smaller Coburg Island (Остров Кобург; Ostrov Koburg), at lat 81° 52' N; long 58° 14' E. This island is named after the Saxe-Coburg-Gotha dynasty. Princess Stéphanie of Belgium, the wife of Crown Prince Rudolf of Austria (after whom Rudolf Island was named) belonged to this dynasty.
- Ostrov Khouena (Гоуэн), is located at lat 81° 49' N; long 58° 32' E. The island was named by Fridtjof Nansen after Anton Christian Houen (1823-1894), a Norwegian merchant whose philanthropy supported construction of Nansen's ship, the Fram.

== See also ==
- List of islands of Russia
