= Ivan Sokolov-Mikitov =

Soviet Russian writer and journalist

- Иван Соколов-Микитов
- Born: 30 May 1892; Oseki, Peremyshlsky Uyezd, Kaluga Governorate, Russian Empire
- Died: 20 February 1975 (aged 82); Moscow, Russian SFSR, Soviet Union
- Writing career
- Genres: Fiction; memoirs; traveller's sketch
- Notable work: Childhood (1931)
- Notable awards: 3x Orders of the Red Banner of Labour

Ivan Sergeyevich Sokolov-Mikitov (Russian: Иван Сергеевич Соколов-Микитов; 30 May 1892 – 20 February 1975) was a Soviet Russian writer and journalist who took part in numerous journeys and expeditions (including the famous Otto Schmidt-led trip to the Arctic Circle on icebreaker Georgiy Sedov in 1929-1930). Sokolov-Mikitov, best known for his engaging traveller's sketches, was also regarded as a fine nature-observing stylist, in the line of Konstantin Paustovsky and Mikhail Prishvin. Following the tradition of Russian realism (that of Tolstoy, Chekhov and Bunin), but still influenced by 1900s modernist authors (mostly Aleksey Remizov, his good friend and mentor), Sokolov-Mikitov developed his individual style of writing, incorporating elements of traditional Russian folk tales, bylinas and fables. Autobiographical novel Childhood (1931) is regarded as one of his finest.

== Biography ==
Ivan Sokolov was born in Oseki, Kaluga Governorate, Russian Empire, to a family of the manager of a timber estate of wealthy merchant family of Konshins. Sergey Nikitich Sokolov (a variation on whose father's name, [M]ikita, he later used as a second part to his nom-de-plume), and Maria Ivanovna Sokolova (1870—1939), a peasant woman. He spent his early years in Smolensk Governorate, at Kislovo village, his father's homeland. In 1903 Ivan Sokolov entered the Alexandrovsky school in Smolensk, dropped in 1910 (for alleged participation in local revolutionary circles) and moved to Saint Petersburg where he enrolled at the State agricultural management's four-year courses. In Petersburg he met Aleksey Remizov, Aleksandr Kuprin, Mikhail Prishvin and started to write; his debut Salt of the Earth short story, a complicated folklore-influenced piece, was dedicated to Remizov, his friend and critic.

In the early 1910s Sokolov moved to Revel where he started to contribute to the Revelsky listok newspaper; by this time he developed new passions, to seafaring and aviation. In 1913 Sokolov-Mikitov started working as a sailor, then in 1915 he finished aviator's courses and as a motorist during World War I made several flights alongside the well-known ace Gleb Alekhnovich on an Ilya Muromets bomber. In 1920 Sokolov-Mikitov, than an ocean liner Omsk helmsman, got stuck in the Hull, England, port, due to a dockers' strike, then, after the ship had been sold from the auction by some authorities linked to the White Army, found himself an unwilling émigré. In 1921 he moved to Berlin, started to contribute to the immigrant magazines and published several books (Kuzovok, Where a Bird Won’t Nest). Among his regular correspondents of the time were Ivan Bunin and Alexander Kuprin; he communicated with Maxim Gorky, Aleksey Tolstoy, Sergei Yesenin, Aleksey Remizov and Boris Pilnyak.

In the summer of 1922 Sokolov-Mikitov returned to Russia and settled in Kochany, near Smolensk where he spent next 7 years which proved to be his most productive. There he wrote several short stories cycles: On Nevestnitsa River, On My Own Land and Sea-faring Stories; novellas Siskin's Bay and Yelenh. In 1929-1930 Sokolov-Mikitov took part in Otto Schmidt's Sedov expedition to Severnaya Zemlya and Franz Josef Land. As an Izvestia correspondent he was part of another mission, that of rescuing the Malygin ice-breaker. In 1930-1931 he published The Overseas Stories, On White Land and autobiographical novel Childhood, his own personal favourite. On July 1, 1934, Sokolov-Mikitov became the member of the Union of Soviet Writers. After the personal invitation from Joseph Stalin, Sokolov-Mikitov received a flat in Leningrad and was awarded the Order of the Red Banner of Labour (all in all, he's had three of them).

As the war broke out, Sokolov-Mikitov asked to be mobilized but has been evacuated instead to Perm where he started working as Izvestia's Ural special correspondent. In the summer of 1945 he returned to Leningrad. For the next two decades he's been travelling all over the country, and published more books: The Hunter's Stories, By the Blue Sea, Over the Light River, By Forests and Fields, On Warm Land, among them. Sokolov-Mikitov died in Moscow on February 20, 1975. By his request, he was cremated and his ashes were buried in Gatchina, near Saint Petersburg.
