= Aleksey Remizov =

Russian author

- Алексей Ремизов
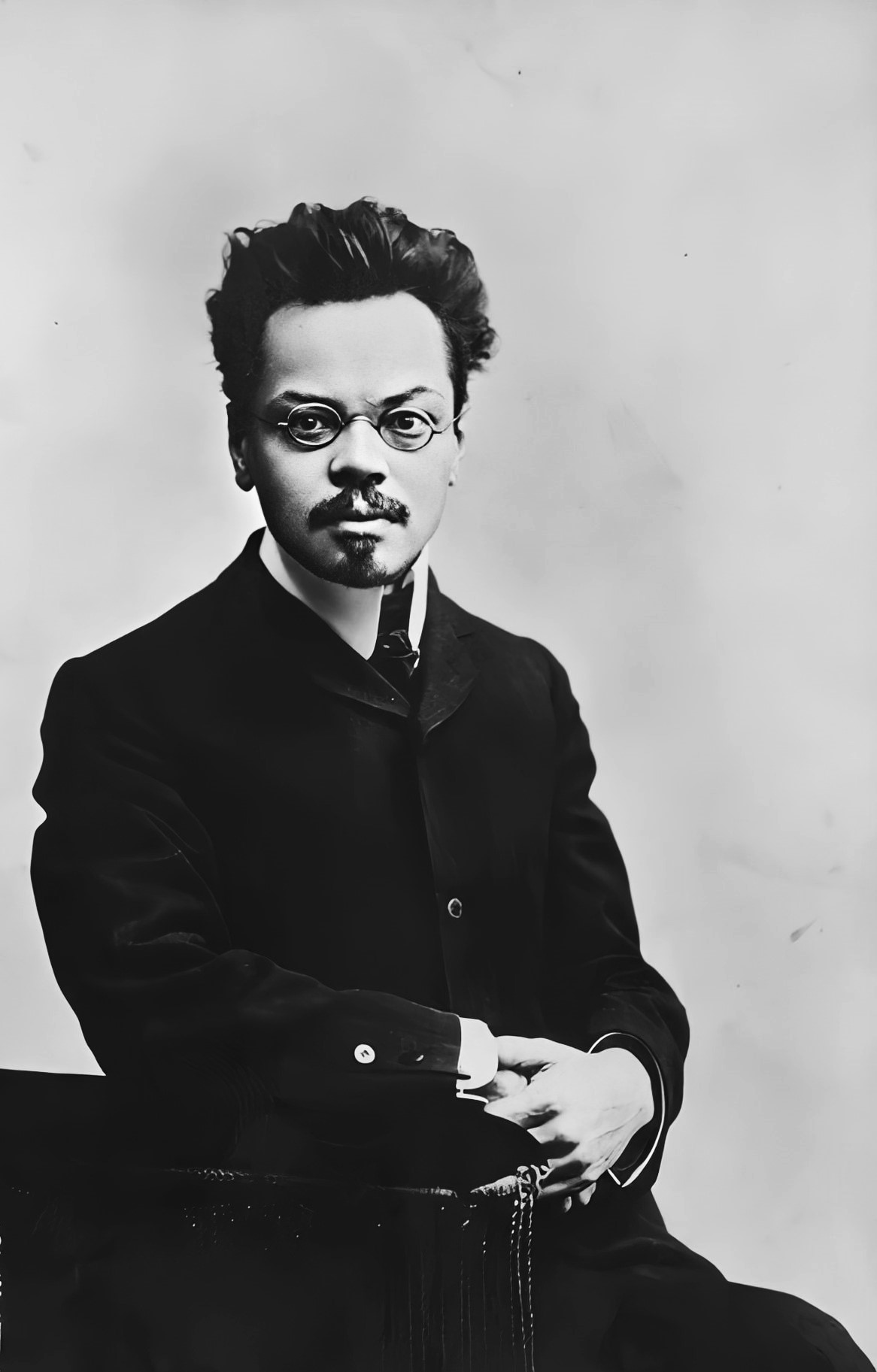
- Born: 6 July 1877; Moscow, Russian Empire
- Died: 26 November 1957 (aged 80); Paris, France
- Citizenship: Russian Empire (1877–1917); Soviet Russia (1917–1922); Stateless (1922–1952); Soviet Union (1952–1957)
- Education: Moscow University
- Occupations: Novelist; short story writer; playwright; poet; memoirist; essayist; calligrapher; artist
- Writing career
- Movements: Modernism; Russian symbolism; expressionism

Aleksey Mikhailovich Remizov (Russian: Алексей Михайлович Ремизов; 6 July [O.S. 24 June] 1877 – 26 November 1957) was a Russian modernist writer whose creative imagination veered to the fantastic and bizarre. Apart from literary works, Remizov was an expert calligrapher who sought to revive this visual art in Russia.

== Biography ==
Remizov was reared in the merchant milieu of Moscow. As a student of the Moscow University, he was involved in the radical politics and spent eight years in prison and Siberian exile. At that time, he developed a keen interest in Russian folklore and married a student of ancient Russian art, who brought him in contact with the Roerichs.

In 1905, he settled in Saint Petersburg and started to imitate medieval folk tales. His self-professed ambition was to catch "the bitterness and absurdity of folklore imagination". Remizov's whimsical stylizations of the saints' lives were ignored at first, partly due to their florid and turgid language, but his more traditional prose works set in the underworld of Russian cities gained him a great deal of publicity.

In his satirical novella The History of the Tinkling Cymbal and Sounding Brass (1910/1922) Remizov depicted the eccentricities and superstitions of rural sectarians. Another striking work of this period is "The Sacrifice", a Gothic horror story in which "a ghostly double of a father comes to kill his innocent daughter in the mistaken belief that she is a chicken".

By the time of the Russian Revolution, Remizov had concentrated on imitating more or less obscure works of medieval Russian literature. He responded to the revolution by the Lay of the Ruin of the Russian Land, a paraphrase of the 13th-century work bemoaning the Mongol invasion of Russia. In 1921 he moved to Berlin and then in 1923 - to Paris, where he published an account of his attitudes towards the revolution under the title Whirlwind Russia (1927).

During his years in exile, Remizov brought out a number of bizarre works, featuring demons and nightmare creatures. The writer also developed a keen interest in dreams and wrote a few works on the subject that involved prominent figures of Russian literature (Gogol, Dostoyevsky and others). Although he was so prolific many of his works failed to find a publisher (in fact, from 1931 to 1952 there was not a single book published).

Remizov was also the first Russian modernist author to attract the attention of the luminaries of the Parisian literary world, such as James Joyce. His reputation suffered a decline when, following World War II, he announced his interest in returning to the Soviet Union and even obtained a Soviet passport (which he did not have a chance to use). After that, Remizov was abhorred by the émigré litterateurs, the most famous of whom, Vladimir Nabokov, used to say that the only nice thing about Remizov was that he really lived in the world of literature. The years 1952 to 1957 saw a number of Remizov's books published, though only a very limited number of copies were printed.

== Legacy ==
Along with Andrei Bely, Remizov was one of the most famous Russian modernist writers. He became known for his experimental skaz techniques and "underground Dostoevskianism". As D. S. Mirsky notes, Remizov's works influenced Yevgeny Zamyatin, Aleksey Nikolayevich Tolstoy and Mikhail Prishvin.

Of all the representatives of radical impressionism in contemporary Russian literature, Remizov is perhaps the most radical. He does not imagine the real life except through some ominous, ugly, fantastic and mysterious glass ... Remizov is sincere to the point of naivety, he conjures, whispers, condemns and babbles strange, frightening words with complete unbreakable faith. Sologub writes his bizarre works according to a strict, definite plan, which he skillfully keeps to; Remizov outlines in advance only five or six characters, but they themselves do and say whatever they please, and the author only from time to time weaves his spells and prayers into their chaotic, delusional life. Sologub writes clearly, but you don't believe him - Remizov is abrupt, repeats himself, expresses himself confused and mysteriously, his episodes are implausible, but he possesses the secret of a strange charm that arouses in the reader horror, disgust, melancholy and those nightmarish dreams that possessed us in childhood, during fevers ... Much remains completely incomprehensible to the reader - Remizov's manner of writing is so individual, but perhaps he deliberately resorts to it, because the life of the ghosts with distorted faces he summoned is no less dark and meaningless.

— Aleksandr Kuprin, 1908

== Selected works ==
=== Novels and novellas ===
- Пруд (1905). Pond
- Часы (1908). The Clock, trans. John Cournos (London: Chatto & Windus, 1924; New York: Knopf, 1924; Hyperion Press, 1977)
- Неуёмный бубен (1910). The History of the Tinkling Cymbal and Sounding Brass: Ivan Semyonovitch Stratilatov
- Крестовые сёстры (1910). Sisters of the Cross, trans. Roger Keys and Brian Murphy (Columbia University Press, 2017)
- Пятая язва (1912). The Fifth Pestilence
- В поле блакитном (1922). On a Field Azure, trans. Beatrice Scott (London: L. Drummond, 1946)

=== Short stories ===
- Светлое Христово Воскресение (1903). "Easter", trans. John Cournos (1915)
- Чёртик (1907). "The Little Devil", trans. Frank J. Miller in 50 Writers: An Anthology of 20th Century Russian Short Stories (Academic Studies Press, 2011).
- Жертва (1909). "The Sacrifice", trans. Antonina W. Bouis in The Little Devil and Other Stories (2017)
- Суженаиа (1910). "The Betrothed", trans. John Cournos (1916)
- Белое сердтсе (1921). "A White Heart", trans. John Cournos (1921)

=== Compilations in English ===
- The Fifth Pestilence and The History of the Tinkling Cymbal and Sounding Brass: Ivan Semyonovitch Stratilatov, trans. Alec Brown (London: Wishart, 1927; New York: Payson & Clarke, 1928; Hyperion Press, 1977)
- "Esprit" (1925), "Christ's Godson" (1923), "Faith in Nikolay" (1928), and "Jacob Betrayed" (1928), in A Russian Cultural Revival, ed. Temira Pachmuss (University of Tennessee Press, 1981)
- Selected Prose, ed. Sona Aronian (Ardis, 1985)
- The Little Devil and Other Stories, trans. Antonina W. Bouis (Columbia University Press, 2017)
