= Mikhail Prishvin =

Russian writer (1873–1954)

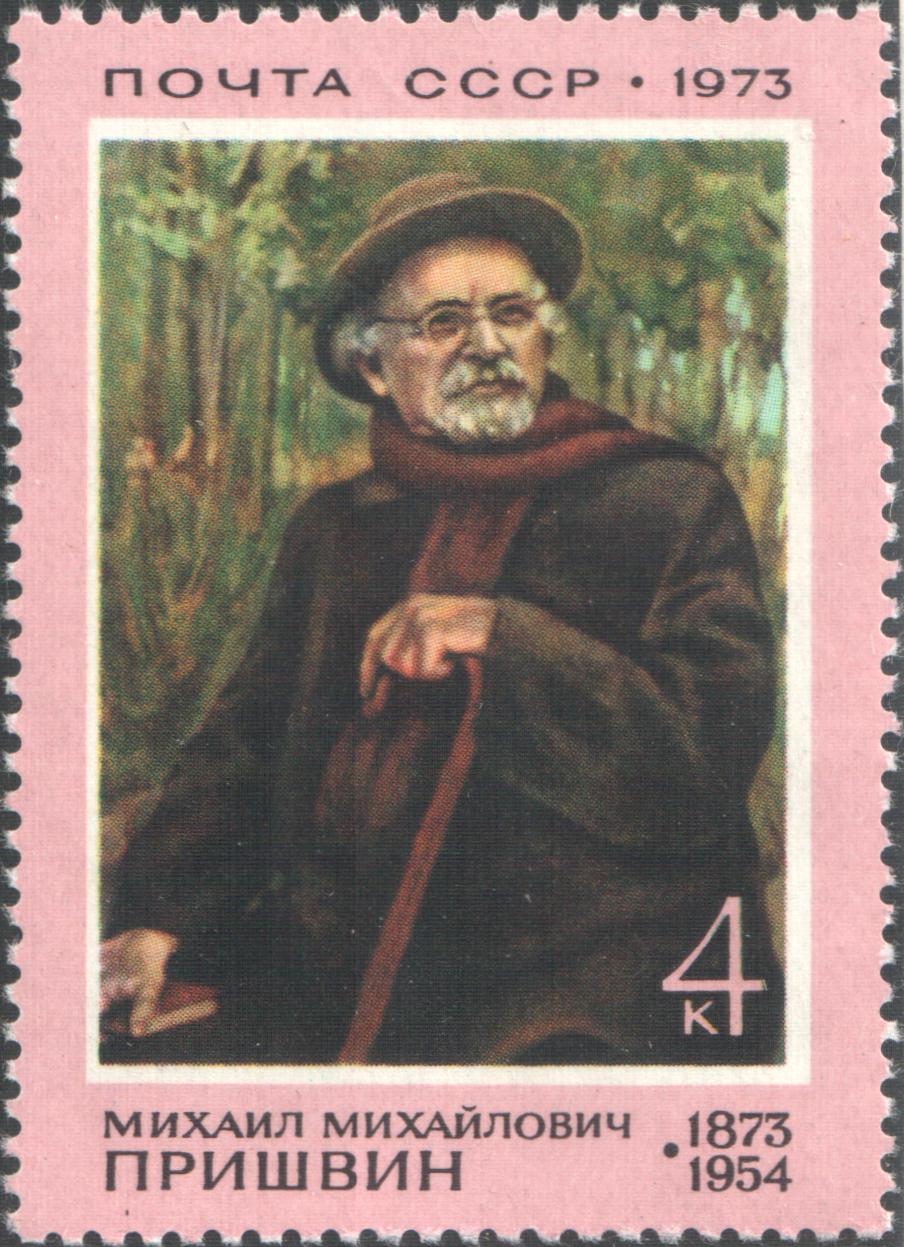
Russian stamp of Mikhail Prishvin

Mikhail Mikhailovich Prishvin (Russian: Михаил Михайлович Пришвин; 4 February 1873 – 16 January 1954) was a Russian and Soviet novelist, prose writer and publicist. Prishvin himself defined his place in literature this way: "Rozanov is the afterword of Russian literature, and I am a free supplement. And that's all..."

== Biography ==
Mikhail Prishvin was born in the family mansion of Krutschevo in Oryol Governorate (now in Stanovlyansky District, Lipetsk Oblast) into the family of a merchant. In 1893-1897, he studied at a polytechnic school in Riga and was once arrested for his involvement with Marxist circles. In 1902, Prishvin graduated from the University of Leipzig with a degree in agronomics. During World War I, he worked as a military journalist. After the war, Prishvin was employed as a publicist and then a rural teacher.

He began writing for magazines in 1898, but his first short story, "Sashok," was published in 1906. Prishvin's works are full of poetics, exceptional keenness of observation, and descriptions of nature. Many of his works were translated into different languages and became part of the gold fund of the Soviet children's literature.

== Selected works ==
- In the Land of Unfrightened Birds / В краю непуганых птиц (1907)
- The Bun / За волшебным колобком (1908)
- У стен града невидимого (1909) - selected works
- Чёрный араб (1910)
- Славны бубны (1913)
- Башмаки (1923)
- Родники Берендея (1925–26) - Enlarged and published as Nature's Diary / Календарь природы (1935).
- Jen Sheng: The Root of Life / Женьшень (1933)
- Nature's Calendar / Календарь природы (1935)
- Фацелия (1940)
- Drops from the Forest / Лесная капель (1943) - selected works
- Кладовая Солнца (1945)
- The Chain of Kashchey / Кащеева цепь (1923–1954; published in 1960)
- Осударева дорога (1957)
- Корабельная чаща (1954)

== Awards and honors ==
- Order of the Badge of Honour (1939)
- Order of the Red Banner of Labour (1943)
