= Flight of the Eagle =

1982 film

- Theatrical release poster
- Directed by: Jan Troell
- Written by: Screenplay: Jan Troell; Georg Oddner; Ian Rakoff; Klaus Rifbjerg; Novel: Per Olof Sundman
- Produced by: Jörn Donner; Göran Setterberg
- Starring: Max von Sydow; Sverre Anker Ousdal; Göran Stangertz
- Cinematography: Jan Troell
- Edited by: Jan Troell
- Music by: Carl-Axel Dominique; Hans-Erik Philip
- Release date: 26 August 1982 (Sweden)
- Running time: 140 minutes
- Countries: Sweden; West Germany; Norway
- Languages: Swedish; French
- Budget: 20 million SEK

Flight of the Eagle (Swedish: Ingenjör Andrées luftfärd) is a Swedish biographical drama film which was released to cinemas in Sweden on 26 August 1982. Directed by Jan Troell, it was based on Per Olof Sundman's 1967 novelization of the true story of S. A. Andrée's Arctic balloon expedition of 1897, an ill-fated effort to reach the North Pole in which all three expedition members perished.

The film stars Max von Sydow as S.A. Andrée, Sverre Anker Ousdal as Knut Frænkel and Göran Stangertz as Nils Strindberg. Dutch-Swedish songwriter Cornelis Vreeswijk plays the role of the journalist Lundström.

It was nominated for the Academy Award for Best Foreign Language Film at the 55th Academy Awards. Many of its sequences were used in the 1997 documentary A Frozen Dream (En frusen dröm), also directed by Troell.

== Plot ==
After Andrée must abort a first attempt in August 1896 to reach the North Pole with the hydrogen balloon Örnen ("the eagle"), he returns from Spitsbergen to Stockholm to prepare for a new attempt the following year. In the wake of this failure, he faces criticism from both societal and scientific circles, openly expressed by expedition participant Nils Ekholm. Andrée dispels all doubts and tirelessly advances plans for another attempt. Ekholm is replaced by Knut Frænkel. The balloon is inspected in Paris at the workshop of Henri Lachambre, while the third expedition member, Nils Strindberg, becomes engaged to his girlfriend, Anna Charlier.

In the summer of 1897, the polar explorers set off again for Spitsbergen, where after some waiting for favorable winds, they manage to launch. However, problems arise soon after, and the journey does not proceed as planned. After a while, the balloon becomes difficult to keep aloft, forcing them to land on the pack ice. The three men are compelled to undertake a grueling trek back over the ice with heavy sledges, which increasingly pushes them to their physical and mental limits. When they finally reach the uninhabited and inhospitable island of Kvitøya, they are nearly at the end of their strength. After Strindberg, exhausted, has died and been buried, Frænkel also loses his life due to an attack by a polar bear. Disillusioned, Andrée remains alone in the barren ice desert.

== Cast ==
- Max von Sydow as Salomon August Andrée
- Göran Stangertz as Nils Strindberg
- Sverre Anker Ousdal as Knut Frænkel
- Clément Harari as Henri Lachambre
- Eva von Hanno as Gurli Linder
- Lotta Larsson as Anna Charlier
- Jan-Olof Strandberg as Nils Ekholm
- Henric Holmberg as Vilhelm Swedenborg
- Ulla Sjöblom as Andrée's Sister
- Mimi Pollak as Mina Andrée
- Cornelis Vreeswijk as Lundström
- Ingvar Kjellson as Alfred Nobel
- Bruno Sörwing as Oscar II of Sweden
- Åke Wihlney as The Captain
- Berto Marklund as The Ship's Doctor
- Knut Husebø as Fridtjof Nansen
- Allan Schulman as Adolf Erik Nordenskiöld
- Staffan Liljander as The Inventor
- Lasse Pöysti as Photographer
- Peter Schildt as Andrée's clerk
- Siv Ericks as Mrs. Assarsson

== Production ==
The early drafts for a script were written in 1977, and the same year a team consisting of Jan Troell, the producer Bengt Forslund, the original writer of the novel Per Olof Sundman and a few other people went to Spitsbergen for location scouting. Troell was at the time in the post-production process of his film Bang!, and when Bang! was selected for the 1977 Cannes Film Festival, the plan was to use the festival to attract investors. However, Bang! was poorly received and the interest faded even from the Swedish Film Institute. The project was put on hold and Troell went to the United States to direct Hurricane, an assignment he was offered after the previous director Roman Polanski had suddenly left the country to avoid sentencing for unlawful sexual intercourse with a thirteen-year-old in Los Angeles.

When Troell returned to Sweden, and the film institute had appointed Jörn Donner as its new managing director, the project was revived. In May 1979 the new writing process started, this time led by Georg Oddner and Klaus Rifbjerg, with Donner himself as producer. The financing was difficult, not least because it coincided with the making of Fanny and Alexander, at the time the most expensive Swedish film ever made. However, Troell said he regarded all the film's expensive visuals as "background", and that "What excited me was the tragic quest and the characters of Andrée and his comrades."

== Release ==
The film premiered on 26 August 1982 in Gränna, the hometown of Andrée. It was entered into the 1982 Venice Film Festival, where Max von Sydow won the Pasinetti Award for Best Actor. A VHS version was released in Sweden in November 2000. Distributor Studio S released a blu-ray edition, with Swedish and English subtitles, on 9 October 2017.

== Reception ==
=== Critical response ===
The Swedish critics were generally very positive about the film. It was praised for its attention to detail and how complete it felt in a review in Göteborgs-Posten by Monika Tunbäck-Hanson: "It is the overall approach and the firm hand that contemporary Swedish films so often lack. Jan Troell lacks neither." Hans Erik Hjertén at Dagens Nyheter made a comparison to Troell's previous films: "The smallness of the humans, ripped from the larger community, is cleverly demonstrated by Troell by letting Strindberg at a distance cover his comrades with a single finger! In such details, the storyteller Troell has always had his strength and has it here too, but he is more restrained than before, it appears to me. Here is not the same profusion of lyrical whims as in previous films."

Internationally the film was also well received. Vincent Canby expressed in a review for The New York Times how he would like to know more about which parts of the story that were derived directly from Andrée's journal and which were speculation. He further wrote that the film "leaves a lot of questions unanswered. Yet the adventure is both panoramic and unusually intimate. Toward the end of the expedition, the personal drama of the three men, as they are overtaken by fate, is detailed with an intensity that is as moving as the earlier sequences are spectacular."

== See also ==
- List of submissions to the 55th Academy Awards for Best Foreign Language Film
- List of Swedish submissions for the Academy Award for Best Foreign Language Film
