= Anna Charlier =

Fiancée of Swedish explorer Nils Strindberg (1871–1949)

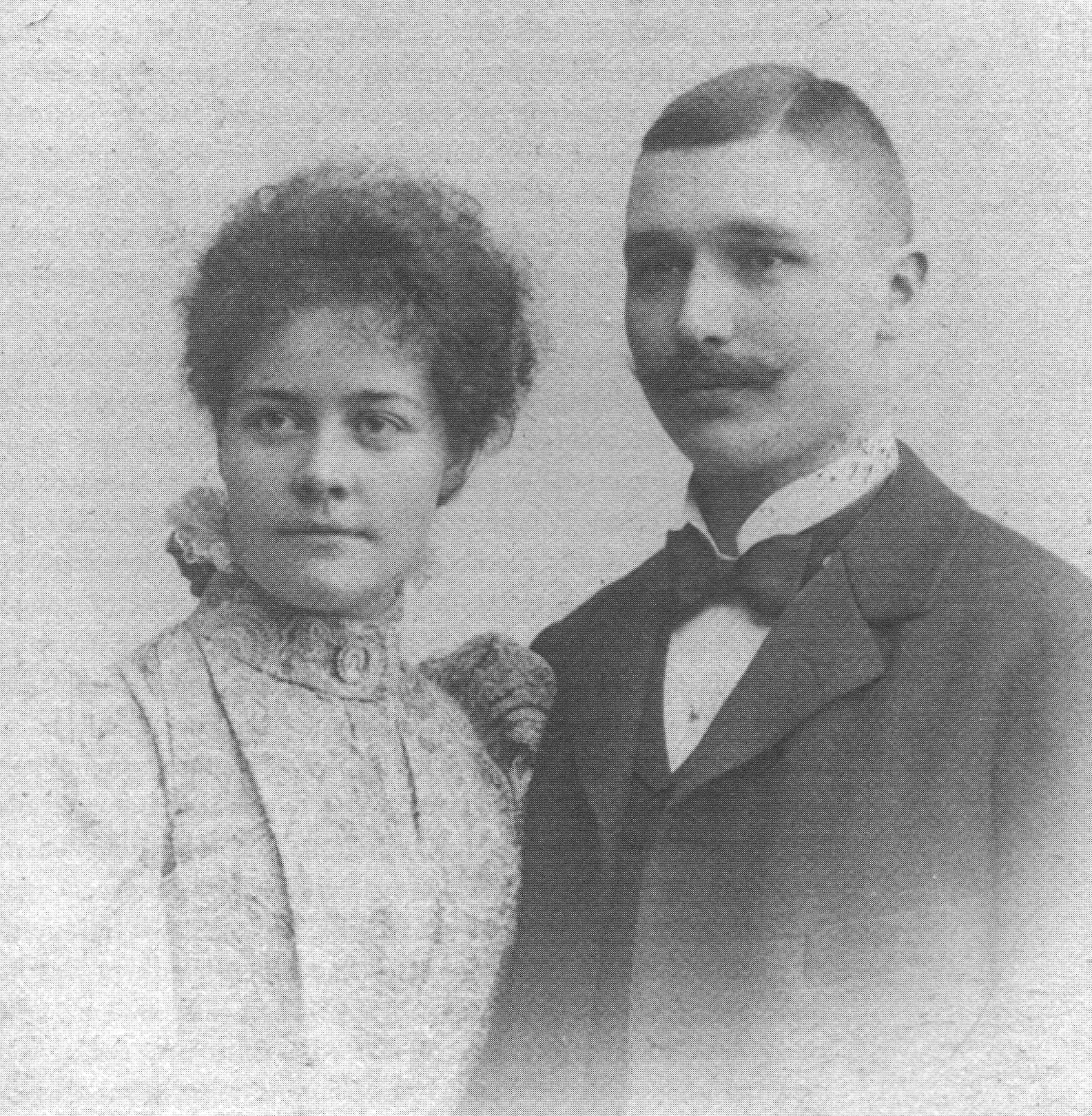
Anna Charlier and Nils Strindberg.

Anna Albertina Constantia Charlier (/'ʃaljə/)) (25 July 1871 – 1949) was a Swedish woman, today most commonly remembered as the fiancée of Nils Strindberg, a participant in S. A. Andrée's ill-fated Arctic balloon expedition of 1897.

== Before the expedition ==
Anna Charlier was one of eleven siblings and lost her parents early. She worked as a governess and met Nils Strindberg, who was a houseteacher for one of the families she worked for. She played the piano, he the violin. Anna and Strindberg became engaged on 26 October 1896, eight months before the expedition left for Svalbard.

== After the expedition ==
The expedition was not heard of in the following years and was presumed to have ended in disaster. Charlier emigrated to the United States in 1910 and married Englishman Gilbert Henry Courtenay Hawtrey. She taught at St Paul's School, Concord, New Hampshire.

Ulla Strindberg – the late Nils Strindberg's niece – visited Charlier in Torquay in England in 1947. She said the following about the visit:

"Anna's husband Gilbert Hawtrey was a wonderful human being who tried in all possible ways to help his sorrow-ridden wife to forget. But it was all in vain. Anna could not forget."

Charlier's home was filled with portraits of the missing Strindberg.

In 1930, when the remains of the expedition were found, Charlier happened to be in Sweden. Unable to stay for the funeral, she sent a wreath to her late fiancé. She later received Nils Strindberg's letters to her that he had written during his voyage over the ice. It was Tore Strindberg – Nils' brother – who sent them after they had been interpreted (the letters were stenographed).

Charlier died in 1949. She had left specific instructions to her family concerning her remains. Her heart was to be removed from her body and buried near the urn that contained Strindberg's ashes. Her body was put to rest at a cemetery in Torquay (her husband was later buried next to her). Her heart was cremated separately, with the ashes gathered in a little silver box and placed in the grave near the cremated remains of Nils Strindberg, in Norra begravningsplatsen in Stockholm.

== Anna Charlier in fiction ==
- In the 1982 Swedish movie Flight of the Eagle, based on the book Ingenjör Andrées luftfärd written in 1967 by Per Olof Sundman, the role of Anna was played by Lotta Larson.
- Anna Charlier is one of the protagonists in the novel Anna's Book by George MacBeth (London: Henry Holt & Co. 1983).

== Other sources ==
- Martinsson, Tyrone:Nils Strindberg, En biografi om fotografen på Andrées polarexpedition, (Lund: 2006) Swedish)
