= A Frozen Dream =

- Directed by: Jan Troell
- Release date: 1997
- Country: Sweden

A Frozen Dream (En frusen dröm) is a documentary film released in 1997 as a follow-up to the 1982 Swedish movie Flight of the Eagle, both directed by Jan Troell. The documentary describes the ill-fated attempt to fly over the North Pole in a hydrogen balloon by Salomon August Andrée in 1897.
