= Vilhelm Swedenborg =

Swedish military and an aeronaut

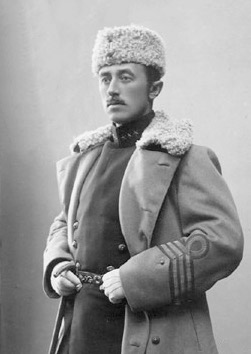
Vilhelm Swedenborg in 1908

Gustaf Vilhelm Emanuel Swedenborg (17 June 1869 in Kvidinge – 1943 in Drottningholm) son of lieutenant colonel Gustaf Erik Oscar Swedenborg and Maria Therése Fock, was a member of the Swedish military and an aeronaut, today remembered as a reservist on Salomon August Andrée's failed North Pole expedition in 1897 and for being one of the first Swedish balloonists. In 1905, he was the first person in Sweden to be issued an aeronautical certificate.

== Participation in Andrées expedition ==
Swedenborg became a reserve member of the expedition in the autumn of 1896. The background for this might be that he was the son-in-law of the famous polar explorer Adolf Erik Nordenskiöld. He was also a relative of the Swedish philosopher Emanuel Swedenborg, and his famous last name gave a certain prestige to the expedition. Swedenborg left for Paris in March 1897 together with Knut Frænkel where they received training in ballooning by Henri Lachambre, the manufacturer of the balloon "The Eagle" that was to be used in the polar expedition.

However, the expedition never needed his efforts, and after the balloon took off from Danes Island, he went home to Sweden where he followed a military career. He also became a famous balloonist and among others, he flew together with Hans Frænkel, the brother of Knut Frænkel. Together with Hans Frænkel and Eric Unge he set a Swedish record in long-distance flying with balloon. In 14½ hours they flew 760 km. This record remains unbeaten.

When the remains of the Andrée-expedition were found in 1930, the dead were transported to Sweden. The aging lieutenant colonel Swedenborg (he was retired in 1921) was part of the honour guard when the bodies were received in Sweden; a display of heraldic grief unmatched until the assassination of Olof Palme almost 60 years later.

== Literature ==
Vilhelm Swedenborg:Över och under molnen, Stockholm 1939, Gebers forlag, 200 pages.

== See also ==
- S. A. Andrée's Arctic balloon expedition of 1897
