= Wallentin =

Wallentin is a Swedish surname. Notable people with the surname include:

- Folke Ronnie Wallentin Hellström (1949–2022), Swedish professional footballer
- Gabriel Wallentin (born 2001), Swedish footballer
- Jan Wallentin (born 1970), Swedish journalist and writer
- Lars Wallentin (born 1943), Swedish physician and cardiologist
- Mariam Wallentin (born 1982), Swedish musician and voice actress
- Tassilo Wallentin (born 1973), Austrian author, columnist, and lawyer
- Uno Wallentin (1905–1954), Swedish sailor
