= Anthony Variclé =

Dr. Jean Antoine Variclé, also known as Anthony Variclé and Antony Variclé, (1853 - July 26, 1907) was an aeronaut, gold prospector, and dentist from France who compiled a photo album of gold rush scenes from the Yukon Territory. He planned a balloon mission to the Klondike in search of the missing Andree party in 1897, and later planned a polar expedition that received major news coverage. Neither expedition took place and he worked as a dentist. He was eulogized in the New York Times July 27, 1907. He organized the International Society for Polar Research and Experiment in 1905.

He was born in 1853 in France. He presented his photographs to the American Institute of Mining, Metallurgical, and Petroleum Engineers in 1906.
