= Júlio César Ribeiro de Sousa =

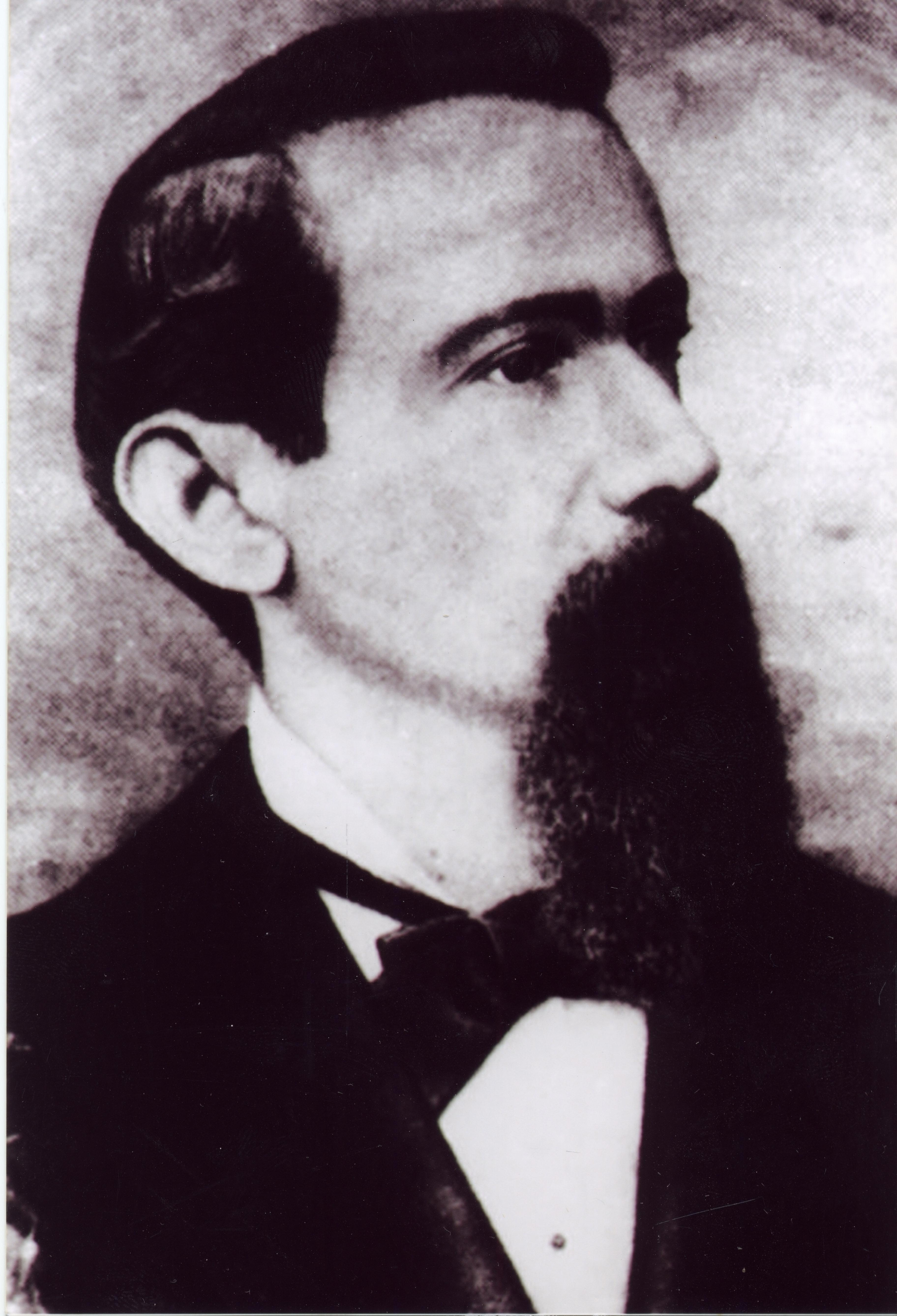
Photograph of Júlio Cézar Ribeiro de Sousa

Júlio César Ribeiro de Sousa (June 13, 1843 – October 14, 1887) was a Brazilian inventor who sought to improve on dirigible balloons during the lighter-than-air era of aviation experimentation.

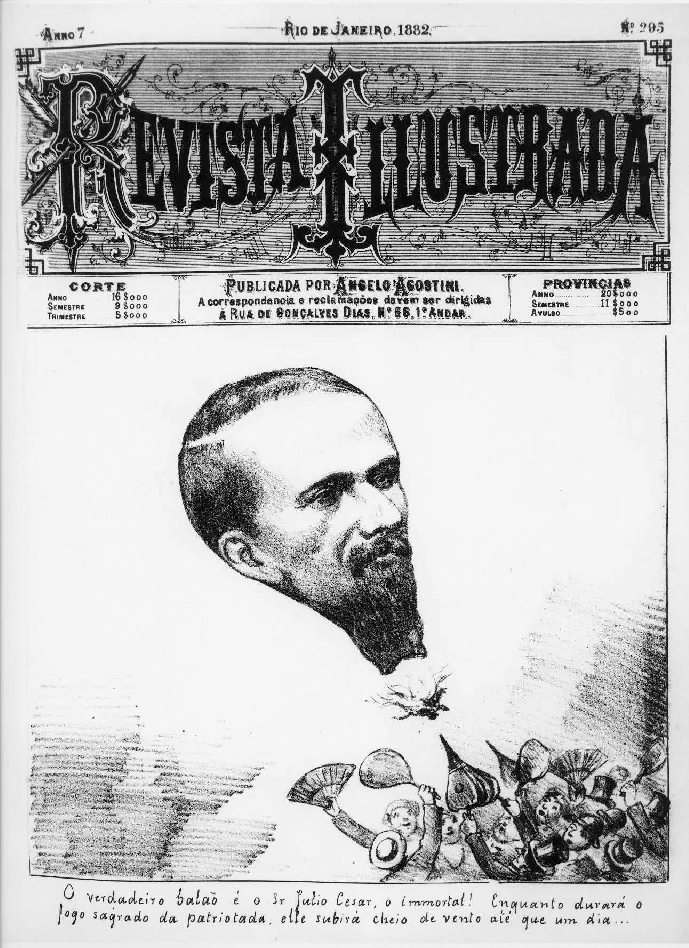
Cartoon on Revista Illustrada (1882) mocking de Souza

== Early life and career ==
Ribeiro de Souza was born in São José do Acará, Belém, Para, to Ana Raimunda da Silva and José Ribeiro de Souza.

He went to the seminary of the Nossa Senhora do Carmo Church in Belém before joining a military school in Rio de Janeiro. In 1866 he was sent to Montevideo during the Paraguayan War. Here he saw hot air balloons being used for battlefield observation. He returned from war in 1869 and then began to write.

He published a collection of poetry Pyraustas (1870) and also launched a weekly magazine along with Joaquim José de Assis and Américo Marques Santa Rosa that espoused republican ideals. He wrote a Portuguese grammar text for schools in 1872 that won a prize and was used in schools. He also worked at a local public library.

From 1874, he began to examine flight, studying the flight of black vultures, and on 1 August 1880, he wrote an article on aerial navigation (Memória Sobre a Navegação Aérea) at the Brazilian Polytechnic Institute. It suggested that by imitating the form of a bird with movable rudders and wings attached to the balloon could make it moveable in any chosen direction.

His idea was sponsored in 1881 and he went to Paris aboard the Paraense to build an experimental prototype with Henry Lachambre. He was given a stipend by the Emperor and a patent was also granted for his invention. About 10 m in length he called it Le Victoria after his wife Victoria Filomena Hippolita do Vale and tested it in Paris in November, heading into the wind without additional propulsion. He returned to Brazil to build a larger model called the Santa Maria de Belem but he had a tear to the balloon, leading to mockery from the local magazine.

A modern analysis of his design suggests that it could not have worked. In the meantime reports came from France on a successful dirigible. The Frenchmen Charles Renard and Arthur Krebs were accused of plagiarism by de Souza. Ribeiro de Souza died in 1887 from beriberi.

In 2010, the airport in Belém was named in his honour as Júlio Cezar Ribeiro International Airport (SBBE).
