= Bea Uusma =

Swedish author, illustrator and medical doctor

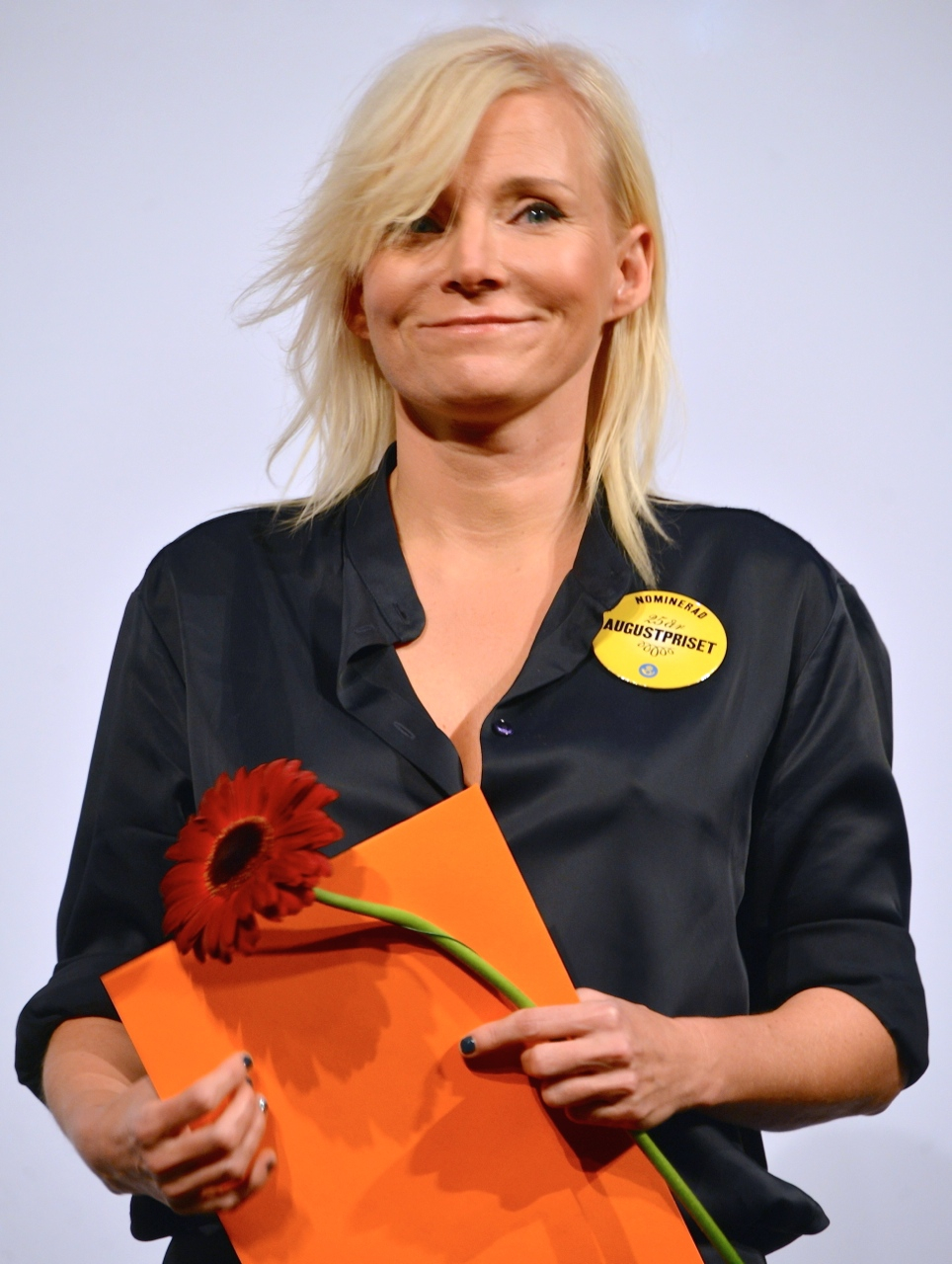
- Bea Uusma at the announcement of nominees for the August Prize in 2013.
- Born: Mari Beatrice Uusma; 20 March 1966 (age 60); Lidingö, Sweden
- Occupations: Author, Illustrator, Medical doctor
- Spouse: Henrik Schyffert (1996–2012)
- Writing career
- Notable work: The Expedition (2013) Kvitøya (2025)
- Notable awards: The August Prize 2013 & 2025

Mari Beatrice "Bea" Uusma, previously Uusma Schyffert (born 20 March 1966 in Lidingö, Sweden), is a Swedish author, illustrator and medical doctor.

== Biography ==
Uusma was born and raised in Lidingö, Stockholm County. In 1999, she wrote and illustrated a children's book about the American astronaut Michael Collins titled The Man Who Went to the Far Side of the Moon: The Story of Apollo 11 Astronaut Michael Collins. In the mid-1990s she became interested in S. A. Andrée's Arctic Balloon Expedition of 1897 and began researching the fate of the expedition members. This research resulted in the book The Expedition for which she was awarded the August Prize for non-fiction in 2013. In 2025, The Expedition's freestanding continuation, Kvitøya, also received the August Prize for non-fiction. She thereby became the first author in the non-fiction category to be awarded the prize twice.

After working as an illustrator for several years, Uusma studied medicine and graduated as a physician from Karolinska Institutet in 2012. She works as a medical doctor at Karolinska University Hospital in Stockholm.

== Personal life ==
She was married to Swedish comedian Henrik Schyffert between 1996 and 2012. They have two children. Uusma is the sister of Swedish actress Martina Haag.

== English bibliography ==
- Uusma Schyffert, Bea (2003). The Man Who Went to the Far Side of the Moon: The Story of Apollo 11 Astronaut Michael Collins. Chronicle Books. ISBN 978-0811840071.
- Uusma, Bea; Broomé, Agnes (2014). The expedition: a love story : solving the mystery of a Polar tragedy. London: Head of Zeus. ISBN 978-1-78185-962-9. SELIBR 17063627.
- Uusma, Bea (2014). The expedition: the forgotten story of a polar tragedy. Head of Zeus. SELIBR 17213401.

== Awards ==
- 2002: Swedish Book Art Award
- 2002: International Book Art Competition award
- 2003: Best Books of 2003 School Library Journal
- 2004: CCCB Choices selection
- 2004: American Library Association Notable Books for Children designation
- 2004: American Library Association Batchelder Honor Book designation
- 2004: American Library Association Nonfiction Honor Book designation
- 2006: Louisiana Young Readers' Choice nominee
- 2013: August Prize
- 2025: August Prize
