= Flight of the Eagle (novel) =

1967 novel by Per Olof Sundman

- First edition
- Author: Per Olof Sundman
- Original title: Ingenjör Andrées luftfärd
- Language: Swedish
- Subject: S. A. Andrée's Arctic Balloon Expedition of 1897
- Set in: Arctic, 1897
- Published: 1967
- Publisher: Norstedts förlag
- Publication place: Sweden
- Awards: Nordic Council's Literature Prize of 1968

Flight of the Eagle (Swedish: Ingenjör Andrées luftfärd, lit. 'Engineer Andrée's Flight') is a 1967 novel by Swedish author Per Olof Sundman. It won the Nordic Council's Literature Prize in 1968.
