= Andrée's Arctic balloon expedition =

Failed attempt to reach the North Pole by balloon

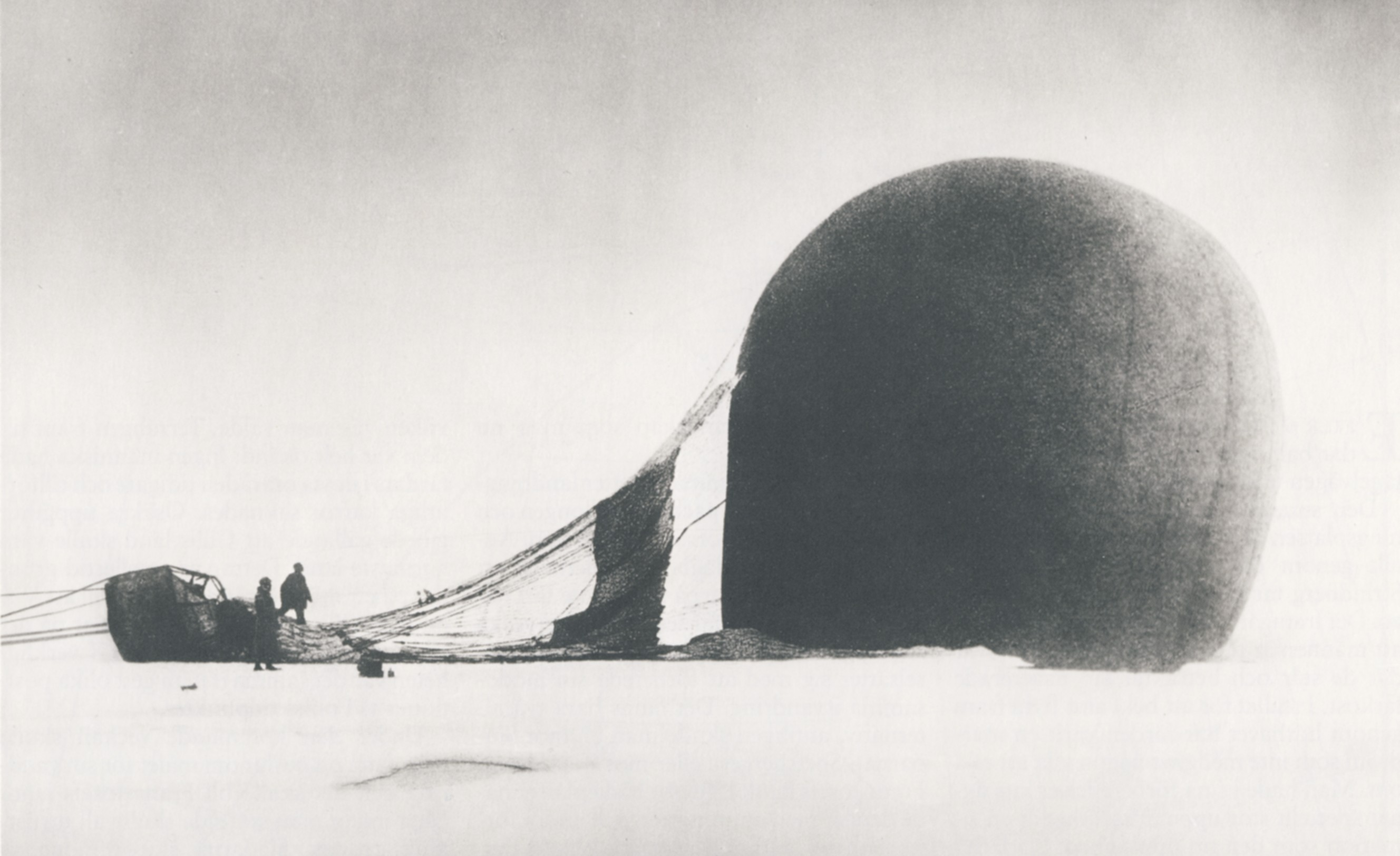
S. A. Andrée and Knut Frænkel with the balloon on the pack ice, photographed by the third expedition member, Nils Strindberg. The exposed film for this photograph and others from the failed 1897 expedition was recovered in 1930.

Andrée's Arctic balloon expedition of 1897 was a failed Swedish attempt to reach the North Pole, resulting in the deaths of all three expedition members, S. A. Andrée, Knut Frænkel, and Nils Strindberg. Andrée proposed a voyage by hydrogen balloon from Svalbard to either Russia or Canada, which was to pass, with luck, straight over the North Pole on the way. The scheme was received with patriotic enthusiasm in Sweden, a northern nation that had fallen behind in the race for the North Pole.

Andrée ignored many early signs of the dangers associated with his balloon plan. Being able to steer the balloon to some extent was essential for a safe journey, but there was much evidence that the drag-rope steering technique he had invented was ineffective. Worse, the polar balloon Örnen (Eagle) was delivered directly to Svalbard from its manufacturer in Paris without being tested. When measurements showed it to be leaking more gas than expected, Andrée failed to acknowledge the risk.

After Andrée, Strindberg, and Frænkel lifted off from Svalbard in July 1897, the balloon lost hydrogen quickly and crashed on the pack ice after only two days. The explorers were unhurt but faced a grueling trek back south across the drifting icescape. Inadequately clothed, equipped, and prepared, and shocked by the difficulty of the terrain, they did not make it to safety. As the Arctic winter closed in on them in October, the group ended up exhausted on the deserted Kvitøya (White Island) in Svalbard and died there. For 33 years the fate of the expedition remained one of the unsolved mysteries of the Arctic. The chance discovery in 1930 of the expedition's last camp created a media sensation in Sweden, where the dead men had been mourned and idolized.

Andrée's motives and mindset have been the subject of extensive fictional and historical discussion, particularly inspired by his apparent foolhardiness. An early example is Per Olof Sundman's fictionalized bestseller novel of 1967, The Flight of the Eagle, which portrays Andrée as weak and cynical, at the mercy of his sponsors and the media. Modern writers have been generally critical of Andrée.

== Background ==
=== Andrée's scheme ===
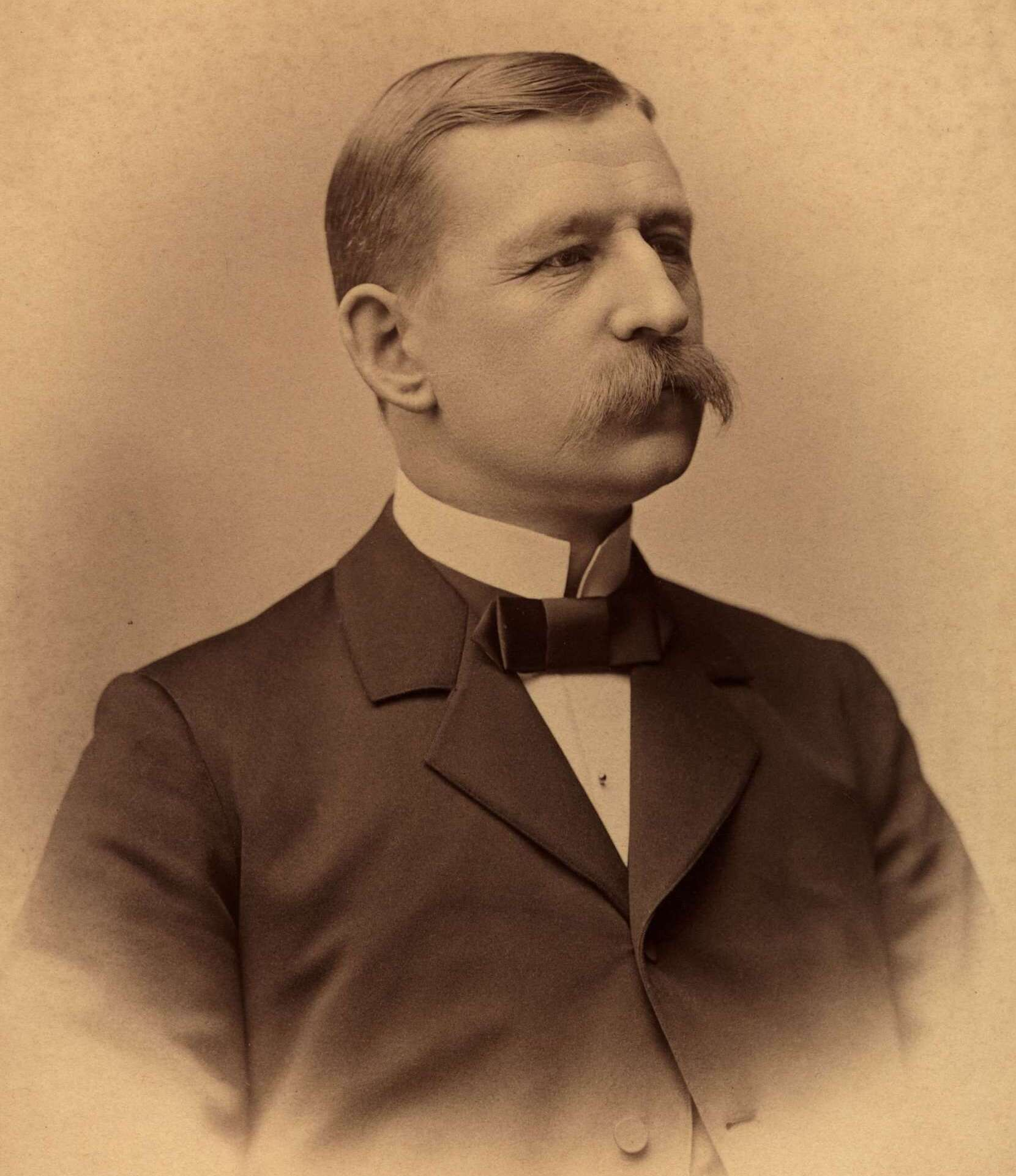
Salomon August Andrée

The second half of the 19th century has often been called the Heroic Age of Antarctic Exploration. The inhospitable and dangerous Arctic and Antarctic regions appealed powerfully to the imagination of the age, not as lands with their own ecologies and cultures, but as challenges to be conquered by technological ingenuity and manly daring. Salomon August Andrée, an engineer at the patent office in Stockholm, shared these enthusiasms. A keen balloonist, Andrée proposed a plan for letting the wind propel a hydrogen balloon across the Arctic Sea to the Bering Strait, to fetch up in Alaska, Canada, or Russia, and passing near or even right over the North Pole on the way. It was also a period of governmental and popular enthusiasm for exploration, often at the service of imperial expansion.

In 1893, Andrée purchased his own balloon, the Svea, and subsequently made nine journeys with it, starting from either Stockholm or Gothenburg and traveling a combined distance of 1,500 kilometres (930 mi). In the prevailing westerly winds, the Svea flights had a strong tendency to carry him uncontrollably out to the Baltic Sea and drag his basket perilously along the surface of the water or slam it into one of the many rocky islets in the Stockholm archipelago. On one occasion, Andrée was blown clear across the Baltic to Finland. His longest trip was due east from Gothenburg, across the breadth of Sweden and out over the Baltic to Gotland. Even though Andrée saw a lighthouse and heard breakers off Öland, he remained convinced that he was traveling over land and seeing lakes.

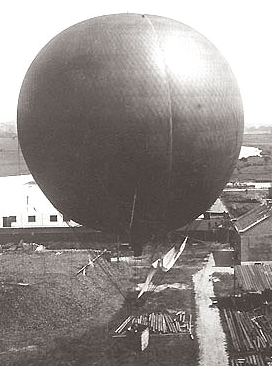
Andrée's hydrogen balloon, Svea

During a couple of Svea flights, Andrée tested and tried out the drag-rope steering technique which he had developed and wanted to use on his projected North Pole expedition. Drag ropes, which hang from the balloon basket and drag part of their length on the ground, are designed to counteract the tendency of lighter-than-air craft to travel at the same speed as the wind, a situation that makes steering by sails impossible. The friction of the ropes was intended to slow the balloon to the point where the sails would have an effect (beyond that of making the balloon rotate on its axis). Andrée reported, and presumably believed, that with drag-rope steering he had succeeded in deviating about ten degrees either way from the wind direction.

This notion is rejected by modern balloonists; the Swedish Ballooning Association maintains that Andrée's belief that he had deviated from the wind was mistaken, being misled by inexpertise and a surfeit of enthusiasm in an environment of variable winds and poor visibility. Use of drag ropes—prone to snapping, falling off, or becoming entangled with each other or the ground, in addition to being ineffective—is not considered by any modern expert to be a useful steering technique.

=== Promotion and fundraising ===
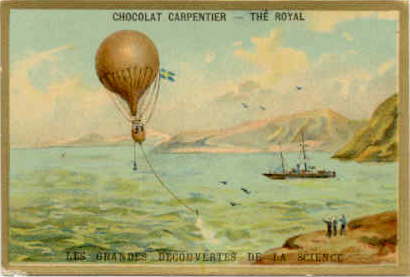
International interest: French artist's impression of the projected launch

The Arctic ambitions of Sweden were still unrealized in the late 19th century, while neighboring and politically subordinate Norway was a world power in Arctic exploration through such pioneers as Fridtjof Nansen. The Swedish political and scientific elite were eager to see Sweden take that lead among the Scandinavian countries which seemed her due, and Andrée, a persuasive speaker and fundraiser, found it easy to gain support for his ideas. At a lecture in 1895 for the Royal Swedish Academy of Sciences, Andrée thrilled the audience of geographers and meteorologists; a polar exploration balloon, he explained, would need to fulfill four conditions:

1. It must have enough lifting power to carry three people and all their scientific equipment, advanced cameras for aerial photography, provisions for four months, and ballast, altogether about 3,000 kilograms (6,600 lb)
2. It must retain the gas well enough to stay aloft for 30 days
3. The hydrogen gas must be manufactured, and the balloon filled, at the Arctic launch site
4. It must be at least somewhat steerable

Andrée gave a glowingly optimistic account of the ease with which these requirements could be met. Larger balloons had been constructed in France, he claimed, and more airtight, too. Some French balloons had remained hydrogen-filled for over a year without appreciable loss of buoyancy. As for the hydrogen, filling the balloon at the launch site could easily be done with the help of mobile hydrogen manufacturing units; for the steering he referred to his own drag-rope experiments with Svea, stating that a deviation of 27 degrees from the wind direction could be routinely achieved.

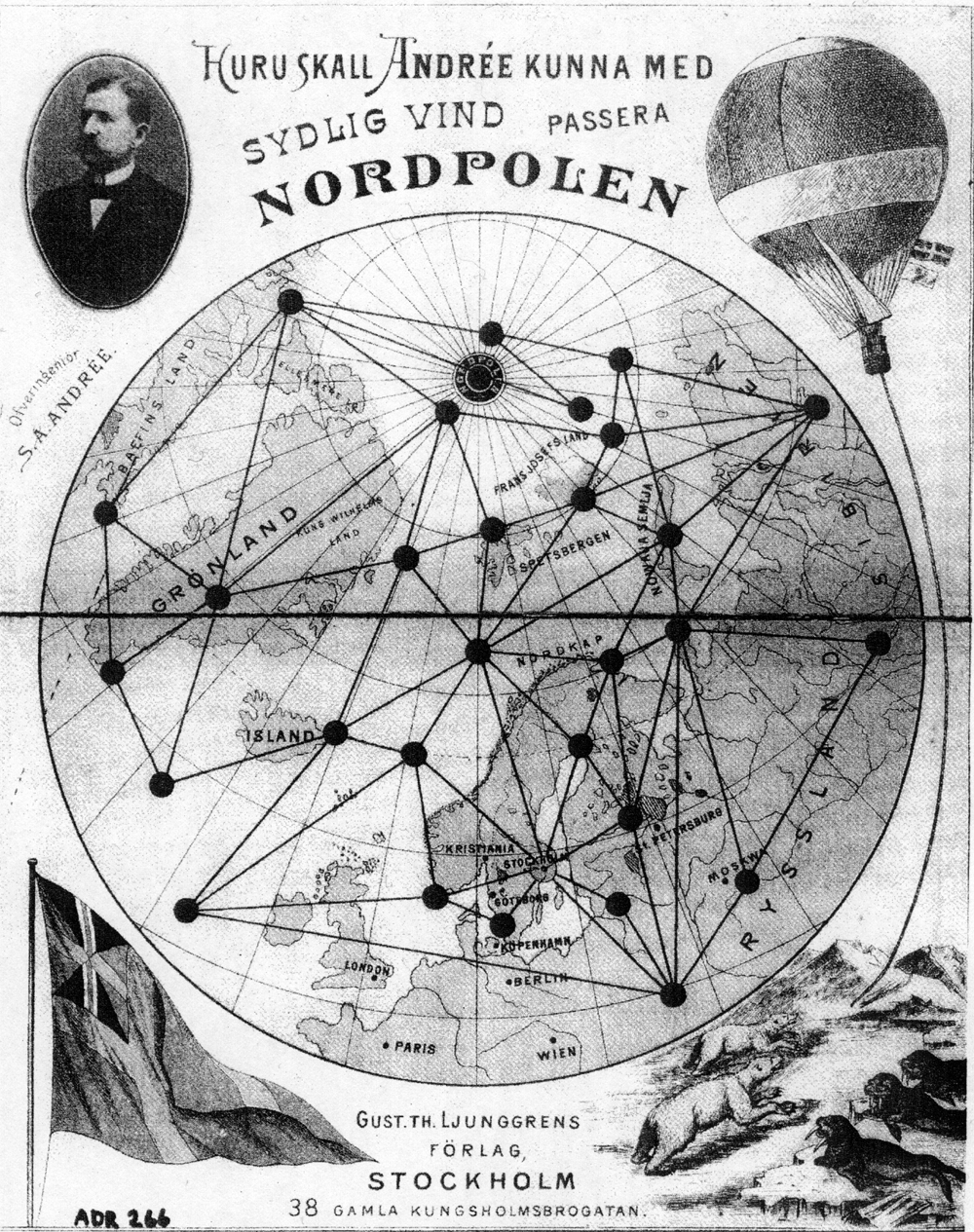
Merchandising in 1896

Andrée assured the audience that Arctic summer weather was uniquely suitable for ballooning. The midnight sun would enable observations round the clock, halving the voyage time required, and do away with all need for anchoring at night, which might otherwise be a dangerous business. Neither would the balloon's buoyancy be adversely affected by the cold of the night. The drag-rope steering technique was particularly well adapted for a region where the ground, consisting of ice, was "low in friction and free of vegetation". He said that the minimal precipitation in the area posed no threat of weighing down the balloon. If some rain or snow did fall on the balloon, Andrée argued, "precipitation at above-zero temperatures will melt, and precipitation at below-zero temperatures will blow off, for the balloon will be traveling more slowly than the wind".

The audience was convinced by Andrée's arguments, so disconnected from the realities of the Arctic summer storms, fogs, high humidity, and the ever-present threat of ice formation on aircraft. The Royal Swedish Academy approved Andrée's expense calculation of 130,800 kronor in all, corresponding in today's money to just under US$1 million, of which the single largest sum, 36,000 kronor, was for the balloon. With this endorsement, there was a rush to support Andrée's project, headed by King Oscar II, who personally contributed 30,000 kronor, and Alfred Nobel, the dynamite magnate and founder of the Nobel Prize.

Andrée's proposed expedition also elicited considerable international interest, and the European and American newspaper-reading public was curious about a project that seemed as modern and scientific as the books of the contemporary author Jules Verne. The press fanned the interest with a wide range of predictions, from certain death for the explorers to a safe and comfortable "guidance" of the balloon (upgraded by the reporter to an "airship") to the North Pole in a manner planned by Parisian experts and Swedish scientists. "In these days, the construction and guidance of airships have been improved greatly", wrote the Providence, Rhode Island Journal, "and it is supposed, both by the Parisian experts and by the Swedish scientists who have been assisting M. Andree, that the question of a sustained flight, in this case, will be very satisfactorily answered by the character of the balloon, by its careful guidance and, providing it gets into a Polar current of air, by the elements themselves."

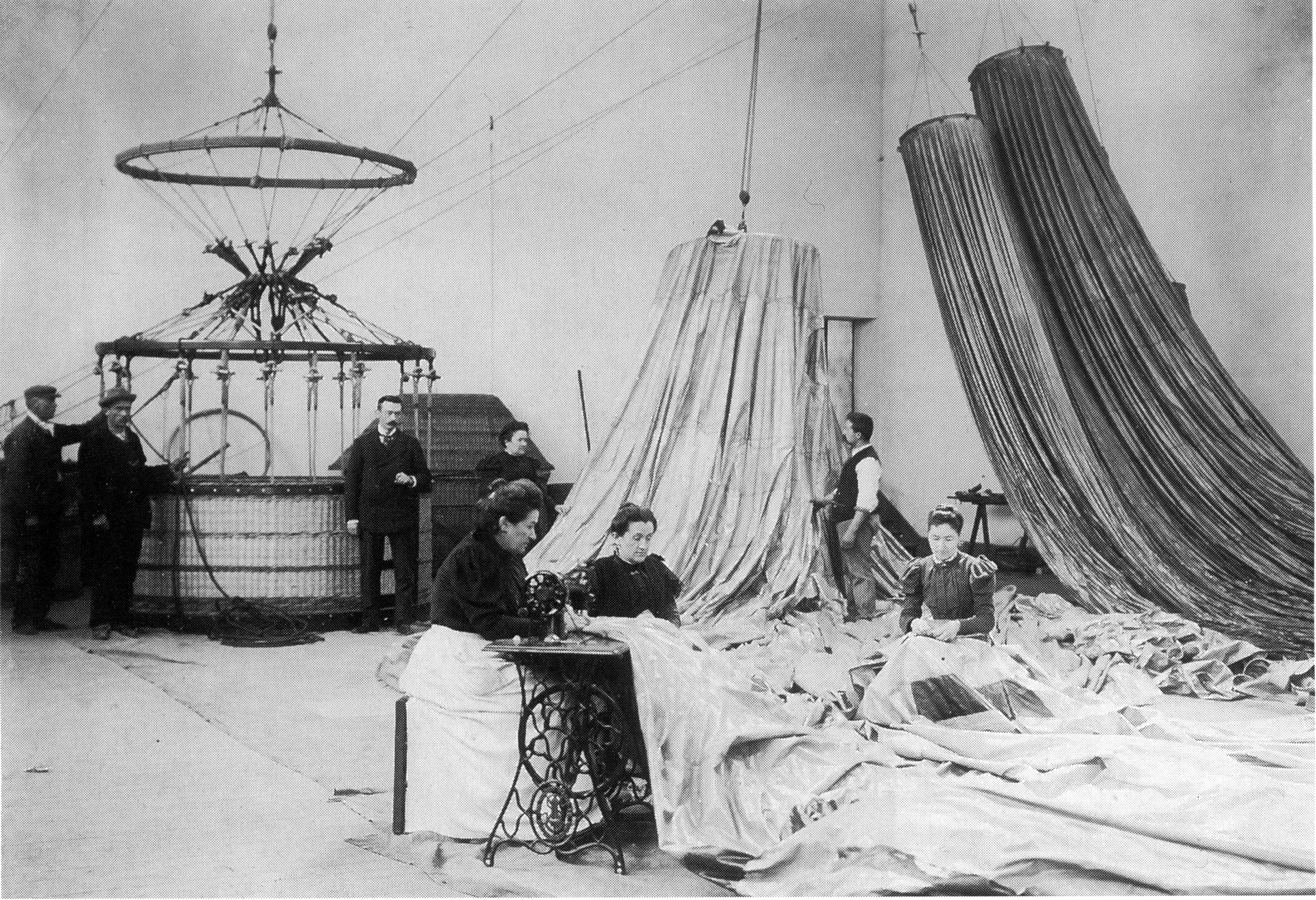
Andrée's balloon was made at Henri Lachambre's workshop in Paris.

Faith in the experts and in science was common in the popular press, but with international attention came also for the first time informed criticism. Andrée being Sweden's first balloonist, no one had the requisite knowledge to second-guess him about buoyancy or drag-ropes; but both France and Germany had long ballooning traditions and several of their more experienced balloonists expressed skepticism about Andrée's methods and inventions.

However, just as with the Svea mishaps, all objections failed to dampen Andrée's optimism. Eagerly followed by national and international media, he began negotiations with the well-known aeronaut and balloon builder Henri Lachambre in Paris, the world capital of ballooning, and ordered a varnished three-layer silk balloon, 20.5 metres (67 ft) in diameter, from his workshop. The balloon, originally called Le Pôle Nord, was to be renamed Örnen (Eagle).

Special technical solutions had to be designed for the accommodations for three adults to be confined in a small balloon basket for up to 30 days. The sleeping berths for the crew were fitted at the floor of the basket, along with some of the stores and provisions. The highly flammable hydrogen meant that cooking could not be done in the basket itself. The solution was a modified primus stove—designed by a friend of Andrée's—that could be dangled eight metres (26 ft) below the crew and then lit from the basket, at a safe distance. An angled mirror attached to the specially designed stove allowed the crew to determine whether it was successfully lit or not.

=== First expedition ===
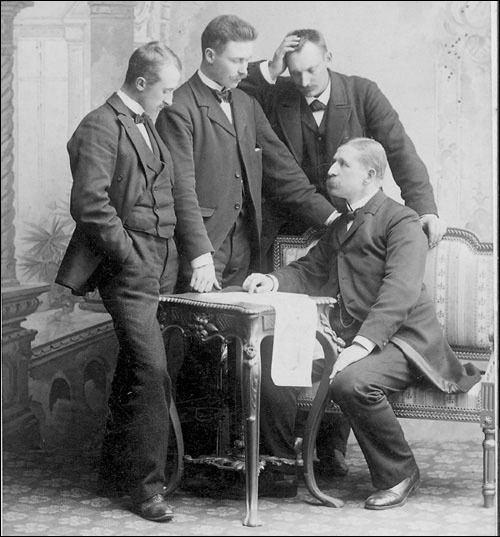
The new crew of 1897, from left to right: Vilhelm Swedenborg, Nils Strindberg, Knut Frænkel, S. A. Andrée

For his 1896 attempt to launch the balloon, Andrée had many eager volunteers to choose from. He picked Nils Gustaf Ekholm, an experienced Arctic meteorological researcher and formerly his boss during an 1882–1883 geophysical expedition to Spitsbergen, and Nils Strindberg, a brilliant student who was doing original research in physics and chemistry. The main scientific purpose of the expedition was to map the area by means of aerial photography, and Strindberg was both a devoted amateur photographer and a skilled constructor of advanced cameras.

This was a team with many useful scientific and technical skills, but lacking any particular physical prowess or training for survival under extreme conditions. All three men were indoor types, and only one, Strindberg, was young. Andrée expected a sedentary voyage in a balloon basket, and strength and survival skills were not considered to be important.

Modern writers all agree that Andrée's North Pole scheme was unrealistic. He relied on the winds blowing more or less in the direction he wanted to go, on being able to fine-tune his direction with the drag ropes, on the balloon being sealed tight enough to stay airborne for 30 days, and on no ice or snow sticking to the balloon to weigh it down.

In the attempt of 1896, the wind battered Andrée's optimism by blowing steadily from the north, straight at the balloon hangar at Danes Island, Svalbard, until the expedition had to pack up, let the hydrogen out of the balloon, and go home. It is now known that northerly winds are to be expected at Danes Island; but in the late 19th century, information on Arctic airflow and precipitation existed only as contested academic hypotheses. Even Ekholm, an Arctic climate researcher, had no objection to Andrée's theory of where the wind was likely to take them. The observational data simply did not exist.

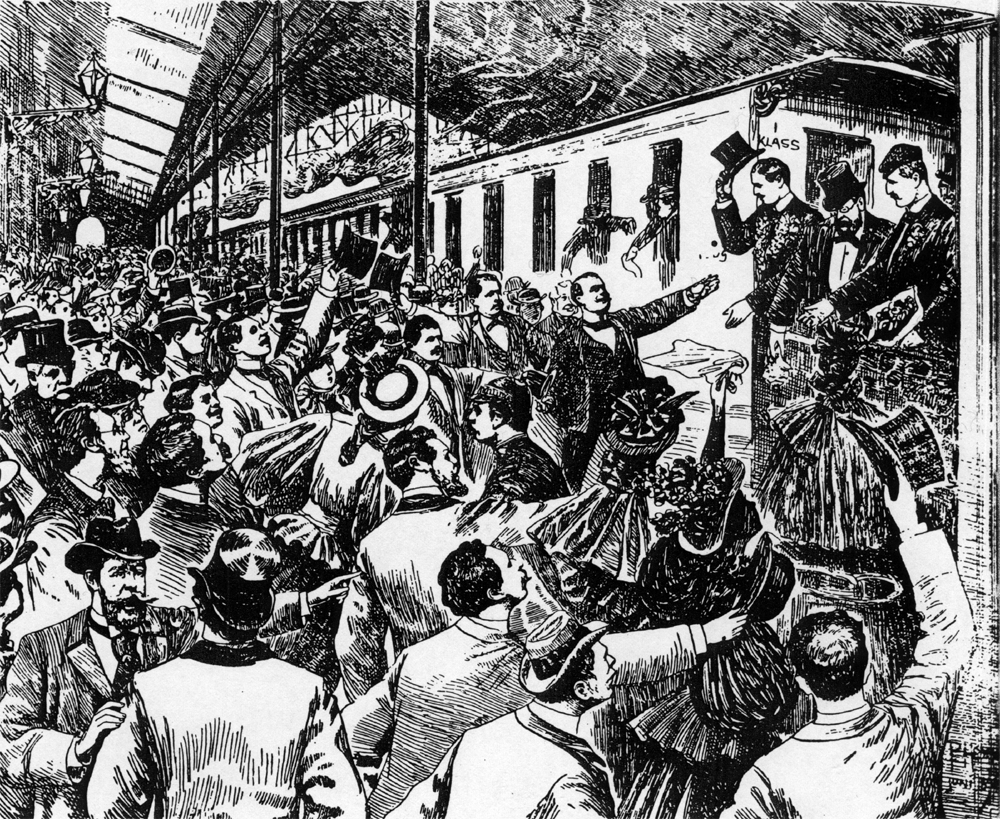
The three explorers' festive send-off from Stockholm in the spring of 1896

On the other hand, Ekholm was skeptical of the balloon's ability to retain hydrogen, from his own measurements. His buoyancy checks in the summer of 1896, during the process of producing the hydrogen and pumping it into the balloon, convinced him that the balloon leaked too much gas to ever reach the Pole, let alone go on to Russia or Canada. The worst leakage came from the approximately eight million tiny stitching holes along the seams, which no amount of glued-on strips of silk or applications of special secret-formula varnish seemed to seal.

The balloon was losing 68 kilograms (150 lb) of lift force per day. Taking into account its heavy load, Ekholm estimated that it would be able to stay airborne for 17 days at most, not 30. When it was time to go home, he warned Andrée that he would not take part in the next attempt, scheduled for summer 1897, unless a stronger, better-sealed balloon was bought. Andrée resisted Ekholm's criticisms to the point of deception. On the boat back from Svalbard, Ekholm learned from the chief engineer of the hydrogen plant the explanation of some anomalies he had noticed in his measurements: Andrée had from time to time secretly ordered extra topping-up of the hydrogen in the balloon. Andrée's motives for such self-destructive behavior are not known.

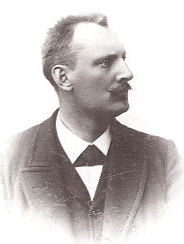
Knut Frænkel

Several modern writers, following Sundman's Andrée portrait in the semi-documentary novel, The Flight of the Eagle (1967), have speculated that he had by this time become the prisoner of his own successful fundraising campaign. The sponsors and the media followed every delay and reported on every setback, and were clamoring for results. Andrée, Strindberg, and Ekholm had been seen off by cheering crowds in Stockholm and Gothenburg, and now all the expectations were coming to nothing with the long wait for southerly winds at Danes Island. Especially pointed was the contrast between Nansen's simultaneous return, covered in polar glory from his daring yet well-planned three year Arctic expedition on the ship Fram, and Andrée's failure even to launch his own much-hyped conveyance. Sundman theorizes that Andrée could not face letting the press report that he did not know the prevailing wind direction, and had also miscalculated in ordering the balloon, and needed a new one to rectify his error.

After the 1896 launch was called off, enthusiasm declined for joining the expedition for the second attempt in 1897. From the candidates Andrée picked the 27-year-old engineer, Knut Frænkel, to replace Ekholm. Frænkel was an engineer from the north of Sweden, an athlete who was fond of long mountain hikes. He was enrolled specifically to take over Ekholm's meteorological observations. Despite lacking Ekholm's theoretical and scientific knowledge, he handled this task efficiently. His meteorological journal has enabled researchers to reconstruct the movements of the three men during their last few months with considerable precision.

== Expedition of 1897 ==
=== Launch, flight, and landing ===
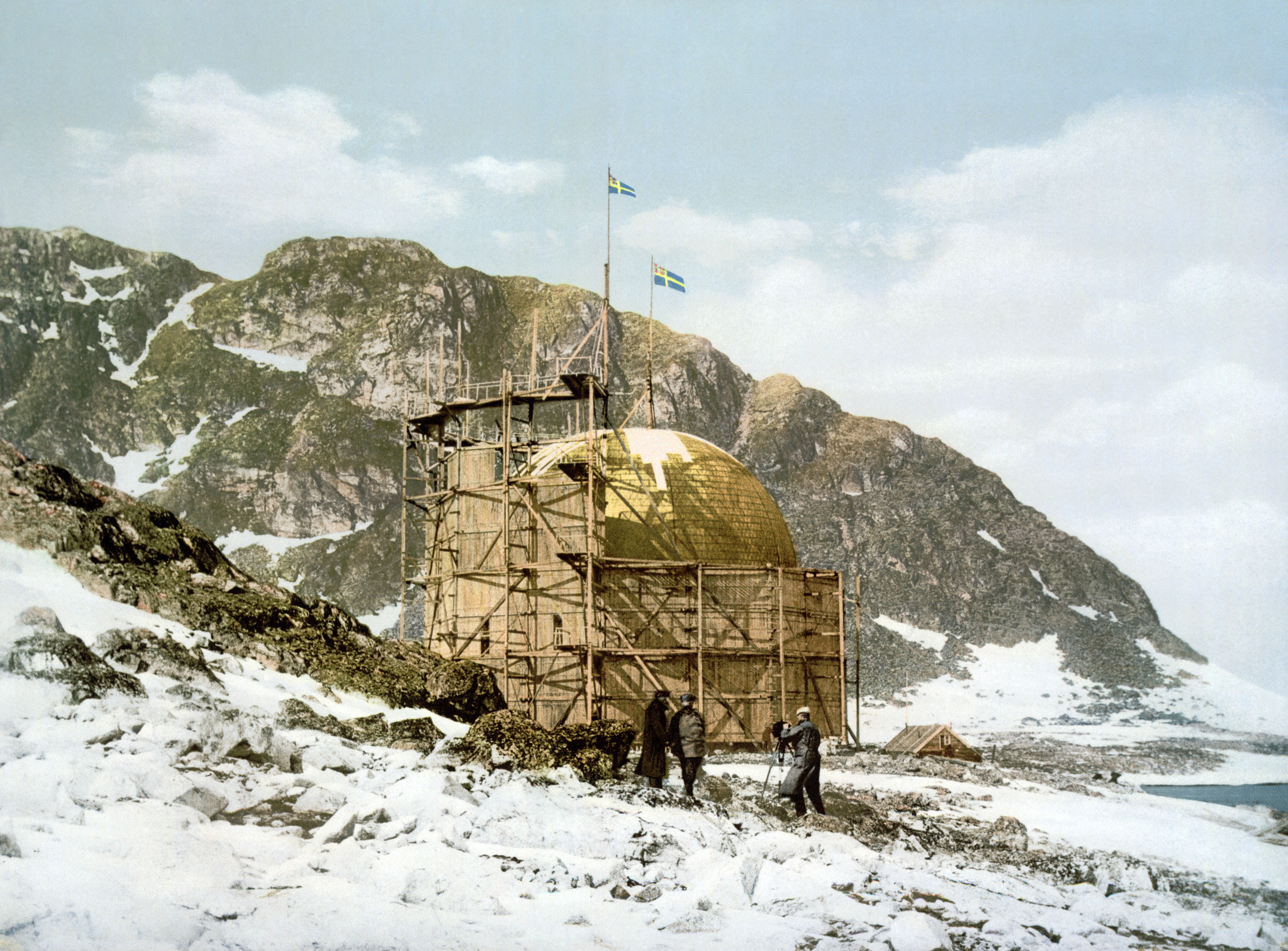
The station at Spitsbergen, from a photochrom print at the end of the nineteenth century

Returning to Danes Island in the summer of 1897, the expedition found that the balloon hangar built the year before had weathered the winter storms well. The winds were more favorable, too. Andrée had strengthened his leadership position by replacing the older and critical Ekholm, an authority in his field, with the more enthusiastic Frænkel.

On 11 July, in a steady wind from the south-west, the top of the plank hangar was dismantled, the three explorers climbed into the already heavy basket, and Andrée dictated one last-minute telegram to King Oscar and another to the newspaper Aftonbladet, holder of press rights to the expedition. The large support team cut away the last ropes holding the balloon and it rose slowly. Moving out low over the water, it was pulled so far down by the friction of the several-hundred-meter-long drag ropes against the ground as to dip the basket into the water. The friction also twisted the ropes around, detaching them from their screw holds. These holds were a new safety feature that Andrée had reluctantly been persuaded to add, whereby ropes that got caught on the ground could be more easily dropped.

Most of the ropes unscrewed at once and 530 kilograms (1,170 lb) of rope were lost, while the three explorers could simultaneously be seen to dump 210 kilograms (460 lb) of sand overboard to get the basket clear of the water. 740 kilograms (1,630 lb) of essential weight was thus lost in the first few minutes. Before it was well clear of the launch site, Eagle had turned from a supposedly steerable craft into an ordinary hydrogen balloon with a few ropes hanging from it, at the mercy of the wind; its crew had no means to direct it to any particular goal and had too little ballast for stability. Lightened, the balloon rose to altitudes higher than what was planned for, where the lower air pressure made the hydrogen escape all the faster through the eight million stitching holes.

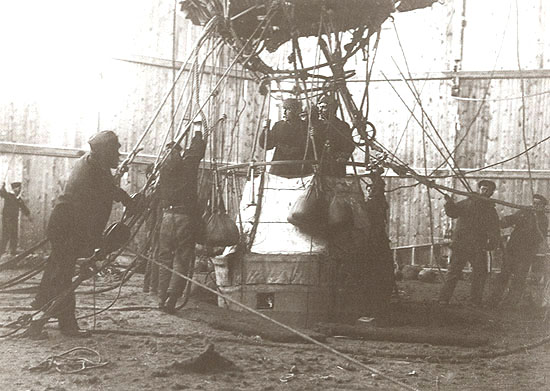
The explorers minutes before takeoff on 11 July

The balloon had two means of communication with the outside world: buoys and homing pigeons. The buoys, steel cylinders encased in cork, were intended to be dropped from the balloon into the water or onto the ice, to be carried to civilization by the currents. Only two buoy messages have ever been found. One was dispatched by Andrée on 11 July, a few hours after takeoff, and reads: "Our journey goes well so far. We sail at an altitude of about 250 m (820 ft), at first N 10° east, but later N 45° east [...] Weather delightful. Spirits high." The second was dropped an hour later and gave the height as 600 metres (2,000 ft).

Aftonbladet had supplied the pigeons, bred in northern Norway with the optimistic hope that they would manage to return there, and their message cylinders contained pre-printed instructions in Norwegian asking the finder to pass the messages on to the paper's address in Stockholm. Andrée released at least four pigeons, but only one was ever retrieved, by a Norwegian steamer where the pigeon had alighted and been promptly shot. Its message is dated 13 July and gives the travel direction at that point as East by 10° South. The message reads: "The Andree Polar Expedition to the 'Aftonbladet', Stockholm. 13 July, 12.30 p.m., 82 deg. north latitude, 15 deg. 5 min. east longitude. Good journey eastwards, 10 deg. south. All goes well on board. This is the third message sent by pigeon. Andree."

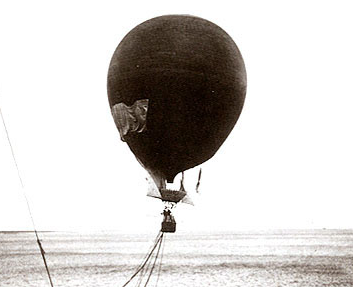
The Eagle sailing north, photographed from Danes Island

Lundström and others note that all three messages fail to mention the accident at takeoff, or the increasingly desperate situation, which Andrée described fully in his main diary. The balloon was out of equilibrium, sailing much too high and thereby losing hydrogen faster than even Ekholm had feared, then repeatedly threatening to crash on the ice. It was weighed down by being rain-soaked ("dripping wet", writes Andrée in the diary), and the men were throwing all the sand and some of the payload overboard to keep it airborne.

Free flight lasted for 10 hours and 29 minutes and was followed by another 41 hours of bumpy riding with frequent ground contact before the inevitable final crash. Eagle traveled for two days and three-and-a-half hours altogether, during which time, according to Andrée, none of the three men got any sleep. The final landing appears to have been gentle. Neither the men nor the homing pigeons in their wicker cages were hurt, and none of the equipment was damaged, not even the delicate optical instruments and Strindberg's two cameras.

=== On foot on the ice ===
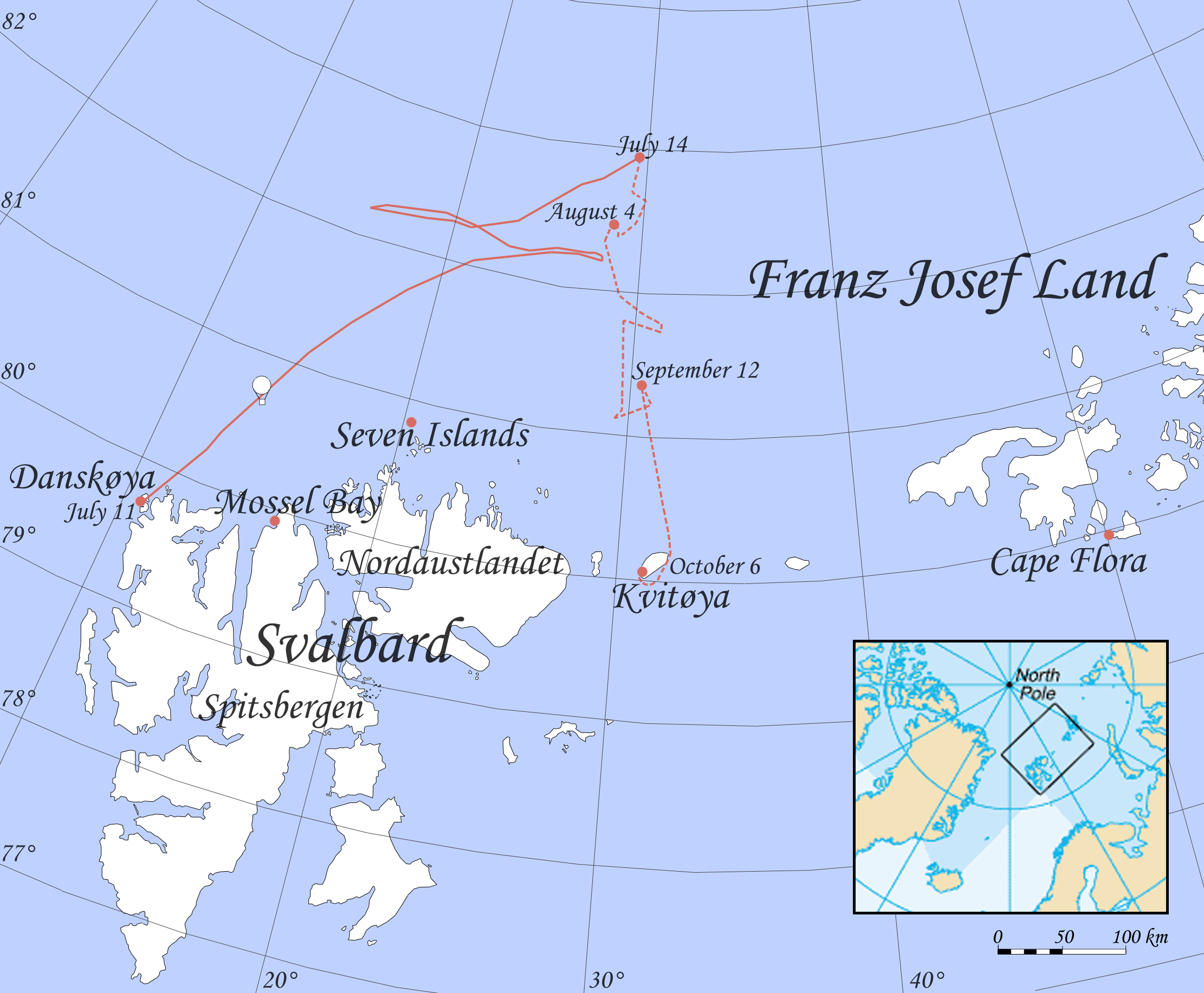
The path followed by the 1897 expedition: north by balloon from Danes Island, then south on foot to Kvitøya

From the moment the three were grounded on 14 July, Strindberg's highly specialized cartographic camera, which had been brought to map the region from the air, became instead a means of recording daily life in the icescape and the constant danger and drudgery of the trek. Strindberg took about 200 photos with his seven-kilogram (15 lb) camera over the course of the three months they spent on the pack ice, one of the most famous being his picture of Andrée and Frænkel contemplating the fallen Eagle.

Andrée and Frænkel also kept meticulous records of their experiences and geographical positions, Andrée in his "main diary", Frænkel in his meteorological journal. Strindberg's own stenographic diary was more personal in content, and included his general reflections on the expedition, as well as several messages to his fiancée Anna Charlier. All three manuscripts were eventually retrieved from the ice on Kvitøya in 1930.

Eagle had been stocked with safety equipment such as guns, snowshoes, sleds, skis, a tent, a small boat (in the form of a bundle of bent sticks, to be assembled and covered with balloon silk), most of it stored not in the basket but in the storage space arranged above the balloon ring. These items had not been put together with great care, and little attention was paid to existing designs already in use in polar regions. In this, Andrée contrasted not only with later but also with many earlier explorers.

Andrée's rigid sleds proved impractical for the difficult terrain, with channels separating the ice floes, high ridges, and partially iced-over melt ponds. The men's clothes included no furs but were woolen coats and trousers, plus oilskins. They wore the oilskins but the explorers reported always seeming to be damp or wet from the half-frozen pools of water on the ice and the typically foggy, humid Arctic summer air, and preoccupied with drying their clothes, mainly by wearing them. It would have meant certain death to lose the provisions lashed to one of the cumbersome sleds into one of the many channels that had to be laboriously crossed.

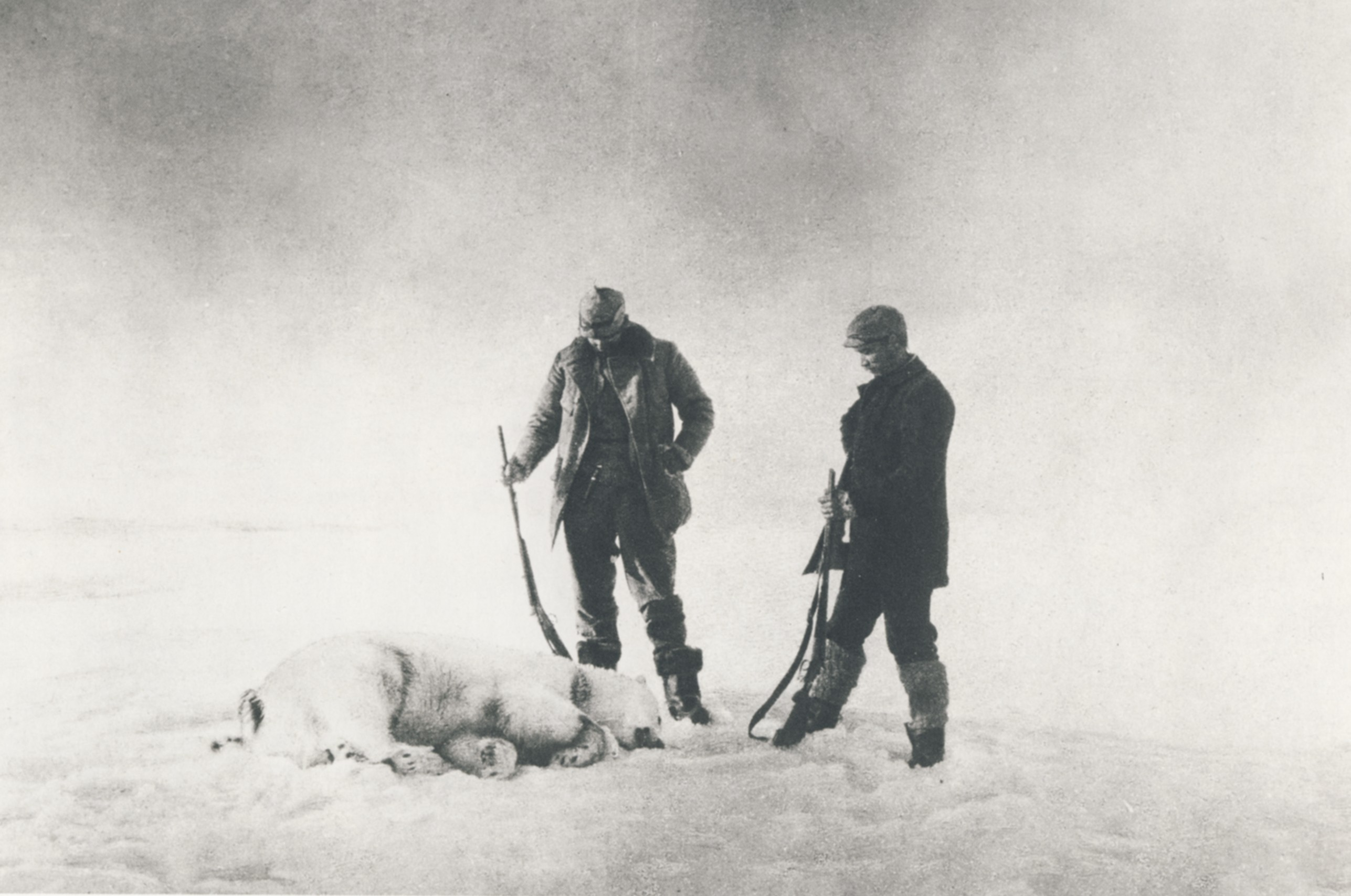
Frænkel (left) and Strindberg with the first polar bear shot by the explorers

Before starting the march, the three men spent a week in a tent at the crash site, packing up and making decisions about what and how much to bring and where to go. The far-off North Pole was discounted as an option; the choice lay between two depots of food and ammunition laid down for their safety, one at Sjuøyane in Svalbard and one at Cape Flora in Franz Josef Land. Inferring wrongly from their faulty maps that the distances to each were about equal, they decided to try for the bigger depot at Cape Flora, which was further away. Strindberg took more pictures during this week than he would at any later point, including 12 frames that make up a 360-degree panorama of the crash site.

The balloon had carried a lot of food, of a kind adapted more for a balloon voyage than for travels on foot. Andrée had reasoned that they might as well throw excess food overboard as sand if losing weight was necessary; and if it was not, the food would serve if wintering in the Arctic desert did, after all, become necessary. There was, therefore, less ballast and large amounts of heavy-type provisions, 767 kilograms (1,691 lb) altogether, including 200 litres (44 imp gal; 53 US gal) of water and some crates of champagne, port, beer, etc., donated by sponsors and manufacturers. There was also lemon juice, though not as much of this precaution against scurvy as other polar explorers usually thought necessary. Much of the food was in the form of cans of pemmican, sausages, other meats, cheese, and condensed milk.

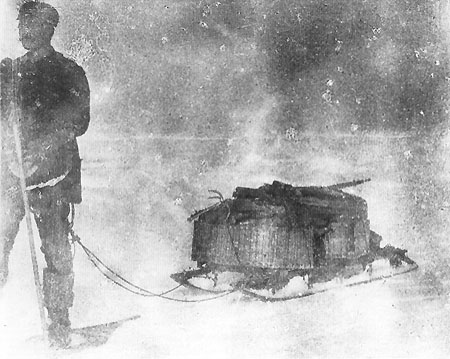
Strindberg on snowshoes with heavily laden sled

By the time they crashed, they had thrown some of the provisions overboard. The three men took most of the rest with them on leaving the crash site, along with other necessities such as guns, tent, ammunition, and cooking utensils, making a load on each sled of more than 200 kilograms (440 lb). This was not practical, as it broke the sleds and wore out the men. After one week, they sorted out and left behind a big pile of food and non-essential equipment, bringing the loads down to 130 kilograms (290 lb) per sled. It became more necessary than ever to hunt for food. They shot and ate seals, walruses, and especially polar bears throughout the march.

Starting out for Franz Josef Land to the south-east on 22 July, the three soon found that their struggle across the ice, which had ridges two stories high, was hardly bringing the goal any nearer: the drift of the ice was in the opposite direction, moving them backward. On 4 August they decided, after a long discussion, to aim instead for Sjuøyane in the southwest instead, hoping to reach the depot there after a six- to seven-week march, with the help of the current. The terrain in that direction was mostly extremely difficult, sometimes necessitating a crawl on all fours, but there was occasional relief in the form of open water—the little boat was apparently a functional and safe conveyance—and smooth, flat ice floes.

"Paradise!" wrote Andrée. "Large even ice floes with pools of sweet drinking water and here and there a tender-fleshed young polar bear!" They made fair headway at first, but the wind turned and they were again being pushed backward, away from Sjuøyane. The wind varied between southwest and northwest over the coming weeks; they tried in vain to overcome this by turning more and more westward, but it was becoming clear that Sjuøyane was out of their reach.

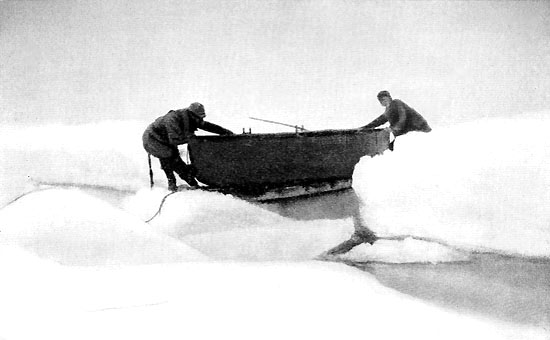
Crossing a channel with the balloon-silk boat

On 12 September, the explorers resigned themselves to wintering on the ice and camped on a large floe, letting the ice take them where it would, "which", writes Kjellström, "it had really been doing all along". Drifting rapidly due south towards Kvitøya, they hurriedly built a winter "home" on the floe against the increasing cold, with walls made of water-reinforced snow to Strindberg's design. Observing the rapidity of their drift, Andrée recorded his hopes that they might get far enough south to feed themselves entirely from the sea.

However, the floe began to break up directly under the hut on 2 October, from the stresses of pressing against Kvitøya, and they were forced to bring their stores on to the island itself, which took a couple of days. Despite these difficulties, Andrée recorded in his diary, "Morale remains good. With such comrades one should be able to manage under, I may say, any circumstances." Strindberg's briefer diary entries indicate that on 5 October the party landed on the island. Strindberg then wrote "Snowstorm reconnaissance" on 6 October and what appeared to be the single word "Moving" on 7 October. Later scientific analysis revealed the contents of the final pages of Andrée's diary, with its last entry on 8 October reading: "It feels fine to be able to sleep here on fast land as a contrast with the drifting ice out upon the ocean where we constantly heard the cracking, grinding, and din. We shall have to gather driftwood and bones of whales and will have to do some moving around when the weather permits." It is inferred from the end of Strindberg's diary on 7 October and Andrée's on 8 October that the three men died shortly afterwards.

== Speculation ==
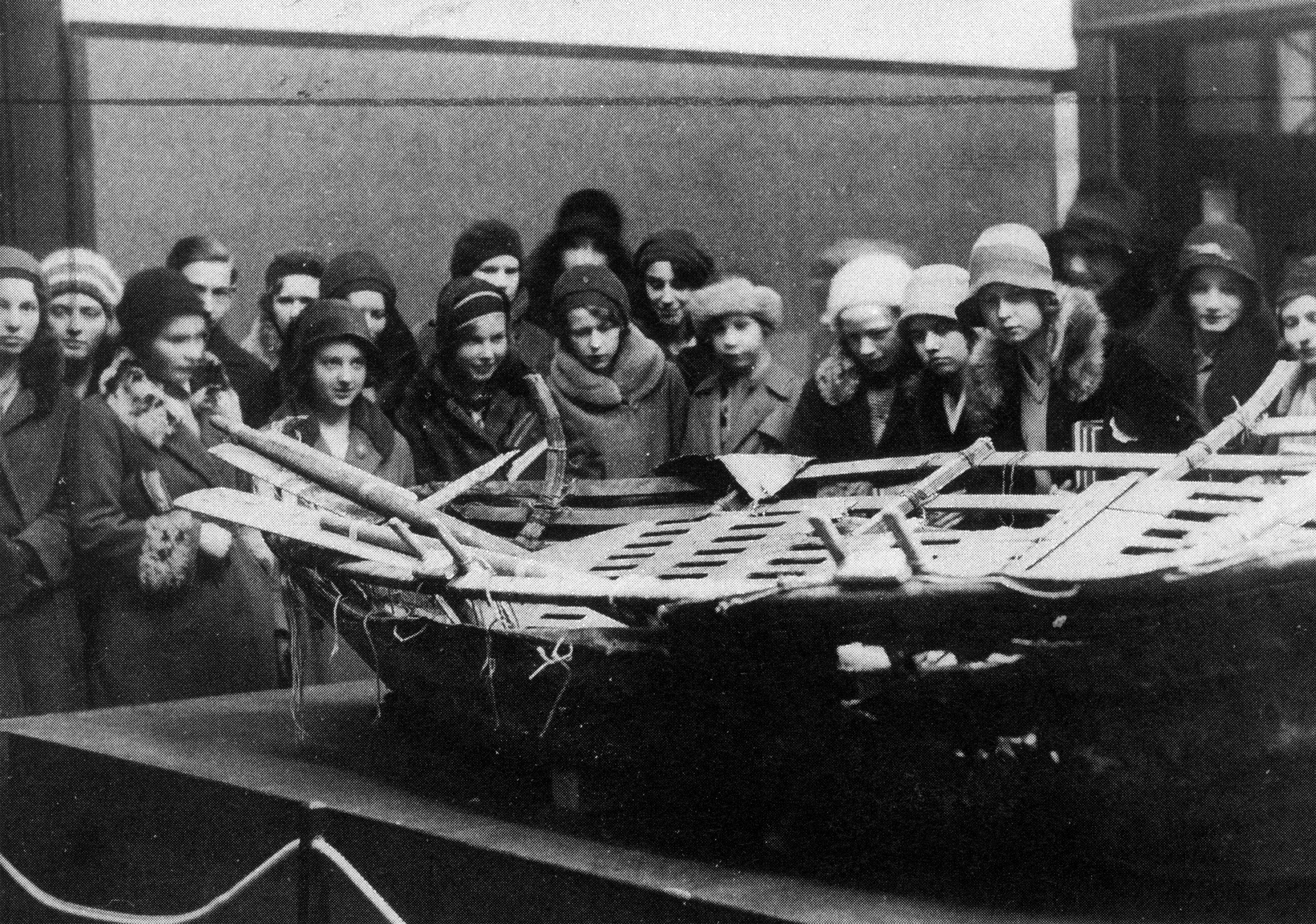
Children at a 1930 exhibition of the Kvitøya finds at Liljevalchs konsthall, Stockholm

For the next 33 years, the fate of the expedition was shrouded in mystery, and its disappearance became part of the cultural lore in Sweden and to a certain extent elsewhere. It was actively sought for a couple of years and remained the subject of myth and rumor, with frequent international newspaper reports of possible findings. An extensive archive of American newspaper reports from the first few years, 1896–1899, titled "The Mystery of Andree", shows a much richer media interest in the expedition after it disappeared than before. A great variety of fates are suggested for it, inspired by finds, or reported finds, of remnants of what might be a balloon basket or great amounts of balloon silk, or by stories of men falling from the sky, or visions by psychics, all of which would typically locate the stranded balloon far from Danes Island and Svalbard.

Lundström points out that some of the international and national reports took on the features of urban legends. They reflected a prevailing disrespect for the indigenous peoples of the Arctic, who were portrayed by newspapers as uncomprehending savages who had killed the three men or showed a deadly indifference to their plight. These speculations were refuted in 1930, upon the discovery of the expedition's final resting place on Kvitøya by the crews of two ships, the Bratvaag and the Isbjørn.

== Recovery ==
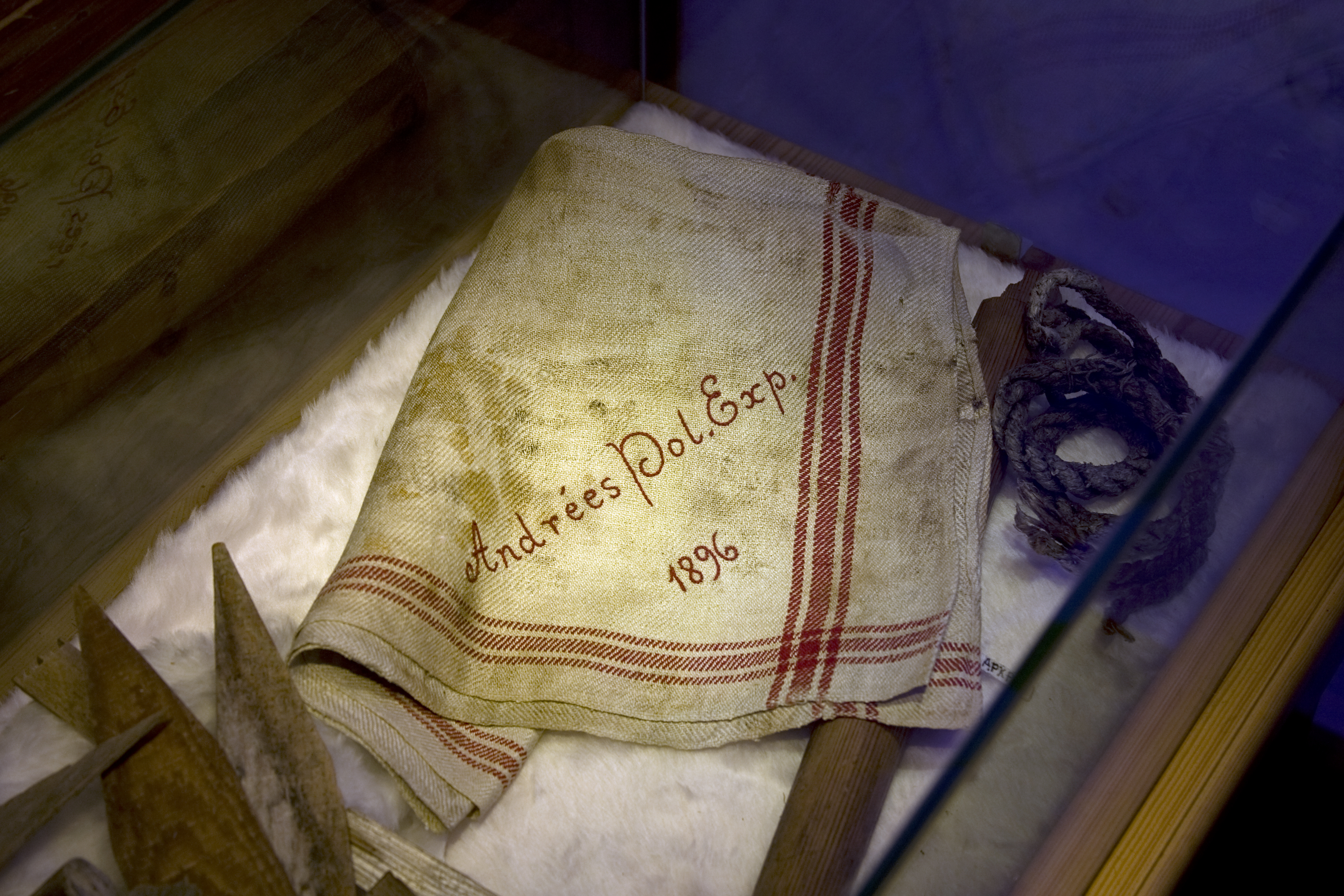
A recovered tea-towel in the Tromsø polar museum

The Norwegian Bratvaag expedition, studying the glaciers and seas of the Svalbard archipelago from the Norwegian sealing vessel Bratvaag of Ålesund, found the remains of the Andrée expedition on 5 August 1930. Kvitøya was usually inaccessible to the sealing or whaling ships of the time, as it is typically surrounded by a wide belt of thick polar ice and often hidden by thick ice fogs. However, summer in 1930 had been particularly warm, and the surrounding sea was practically free of ice. As Kvitøya was known to be a prime hunting ground for walrus and the fogs over the island on that day were comparatively thin, some of the crew of Bratvaag took this rare opportunity to land on what they called the "inaccessible island".

In search of water, two of the sealers, Olav Salen and Karl Tusvick, discovered Andrée's boat near a small stream, frozen under a mound of snow and full of equipment, including a boathook engraved with the words "Andrée's Polar Expedition, 1896". Presented with this hook, Bratvaag's captain, Peder Eliassen, assigned the crew to search the site together with the expedition members. Among other finds, they uncovered a journal and two skeletons, identified as Andrée's and Strindberg's remains by monograms found on their clothing.

Bratvaag left the island to continue its scheduled hunting and observations, with the intent of coming back later to see if the ice had melted further and uncovered more artifacts. Further discoveries were made by M/K Isbjørn of Tromsø, a sealing sloop chartered by news reporters to waylay Bratvaag. Unsuccessful in this, the reporters and Isbjørn's crew made instead for Kvitøya, landing on the island on 5 September in fine weather and finding even less ice than Bratvaag had. After photographing the area, they searched for and found Frænkel's body, and additional artifacts, including a tin box containing Strindberg's photographic film, his logbook, and maps. The crews of both ships turned over their finds to a scientific commission of the Swedish and Norwegian governments in Tromsø on 2 and 16 September, respectively. The bodies of the three explorers were transported to Stockholm, arriving on 5 October.

=== Causes of death ===
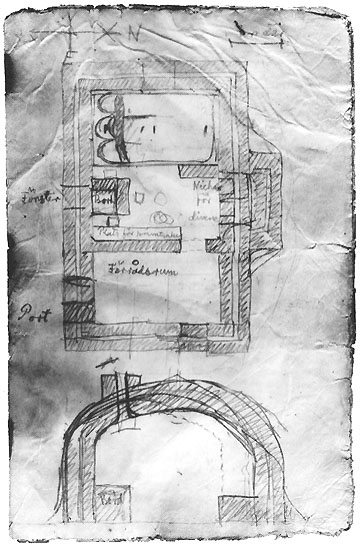
Strindberg's plan for their winter home on the ice floe, used only for a few days before the ice broke up under it. Shown from top to bottom are a bedroom with their triple sleeping bag, a room with a table, and a storeroom.

The bodies of the three men were cremated in 1930 without further examination upon being returned to Sweden. The question of what, exactly, caused their deaths has attracted both interest and controversy among scholars. Several medical practitioners and amateur historians have read the extensive diaries with a detective's eye, looking for clues in the diet, for telltale complaints of symptoms, and for suggestive details at the death site. They agree on many particulars. For instance, the explorers are known to have eaten mainly scanty amounts of canned and dry goods from the balloon stores, plus huge portions of half-cooked meat of polar bears and occasionally seals.

The explorers frequently suffered from foot pains and diarrhea, and were always tired, cold, and wet. After September 10, Andree's diary entries, formerly made daily, grew more sporadic, and his penmanship deteriorated. When the three men moved on to Kvitøya from the ice, they left much of their valuable equipment and stores outside the tent, and even down by the water's edge, as if they were too exhausted, indifferent, or ill to carry it further. Strindberg, the youngest, died first. He was "buried" (wedged into a cliff aperture) by the others. However, the interpretation of these observations is contested.

The best-known and most widely credited suggestion is that made by Ernst Tryde, a medical practitioner, in his book De döda på Vitön (The Dead on Kvitøya) in 1952: that the men succumbed to trichinosis, which they had contracted from eating undercooked polar bear meat. Larvae of Trichinella spiralis were found in parts of a polar bear carcass at the site. Lundström and Sundman both favor this explanation. Critics note that diarrhea, which Tryde cites as the main symptomatic evidence, hardly needs an explanation beyond the general poor diet and physical misery, but some more specific symptoms of trichinosis are missing. Also, Fridtjof Nansen and his companion Hjalmar Johansen had lived largely on polar bear meat in exactly the same area for 15 months without any ill effects. Author and physician Bea Uusma notes that the rate of death of trichinosis is only 0.2 percent and that the main symptom – fever – is never noted in any of the men's diaries, also commenting that no medicines against fever appear to have been consumed by the trio.

Other suggestions have included vitamin A poisoning from eating polar bear liver; however, the diary shows Andrée to have been aware of this danger. Vitamin A poisoning from eating seal liver is another theory, mentioned by Bea Uusma, who however rejects it based on the fact that the men killed a large seal on September 19 and never noted any related illness; also the rate of death from vitamin A poisoning is low. Carbon monoxide poisoning is a theory that has found a few adherents, such as the explorer Vilhjalmur Stefansson. The chief objection is that their primus stove had kerosene still in the tank when found, and that the primus stove was most likely not located inside the tent. Stefansson argues that they were using a malfunctioning stove, something he had experienced in his own expeditions. Lead poisoning from the cans in which their food was stored is an alternative suggestion, as is scurvy, botulism, suicide (they had plenty of morphine and opium), and polar bear attack. A combination favored by Kjellström is that of cold and hypothermia as the Arctic winter closed in, with dehydration and general exhaustion, apathy, and disappointment.

Kjellström argues that Tryde never takes the nature of the explorers' daily life into account, and especially the crowning blow of the ice breaking up under their promisingly mobile home, forcing them to move onto a glacier island. "Posterity has expressed surprise that they died on Kvitøya, surrounded by food," writes Kjellström. "The surprise is rather that they found the strength to live so long."

In 2010, writer and researcher Bea Uusma, of the Karolinska Institute in Stockholm, rejected the theory that larvae of Trichinella spiralis killed the expedition members. After examining the men's clothes, finding what was most likely rips from polar bears in Strindberg's preserved underpants (which he wore while being buried and which were subsequently salvaged in 1930), she concluded that at least Strindberg was killed by polar bears.

In Uusma's award-winning book about the expedition, partly based on her own new research (including analysis of a rarely seen autopsy report from 1930), she puts forth the theory that Strindberg was attacked and killed by a polar bear, which possibly also injured Frænkel, who appears to have died shortly thereafter in the tent, wearing no mittens or shoes. Andree, having buried Strindberg and finding himself trapped alone on the island, unable to leave by himself, then possibly decided to commit suicide via morphine. This theory on Andree's cause of death is supported by the fact that his remains were found in a semi-upright position against a rock, a situation unlikely to have been caused by polar bears, rifle by his side. In addition, nearly emptied morphine bottles were found on the site, as well as Andree's diary neatly wrapped with a sweater, hay and balloon cloth, indicating that he perhaps wanted it to be preserved as a last measure in case someone would later find it.

== Legacy ==
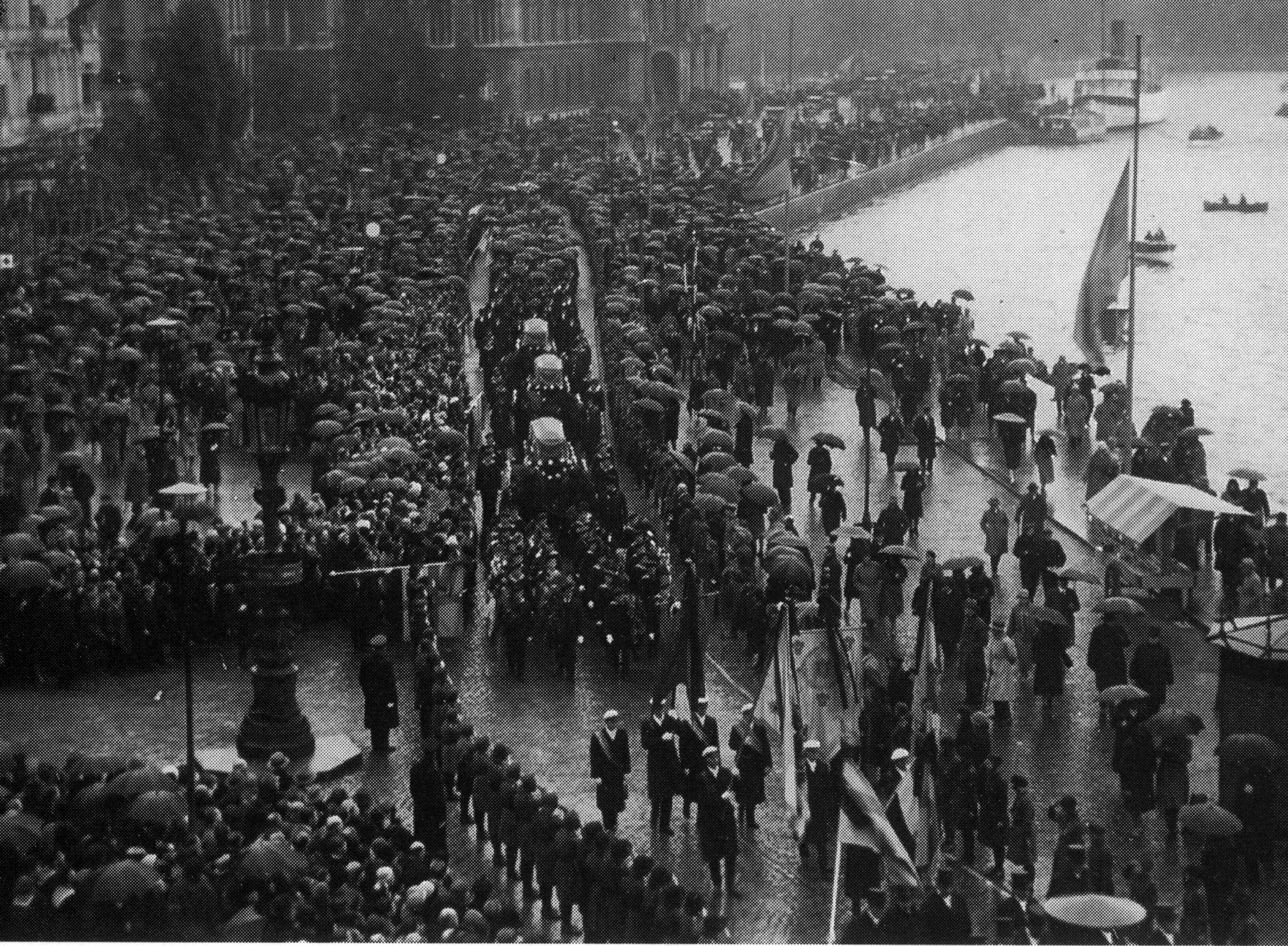
The remains of the three explorers are brought straight from the ship through the center of Stockholm on 5 October 1930, beginning "one of the most solemn and grandiose manifestations of national mourning that has ever occurred in Sweden".

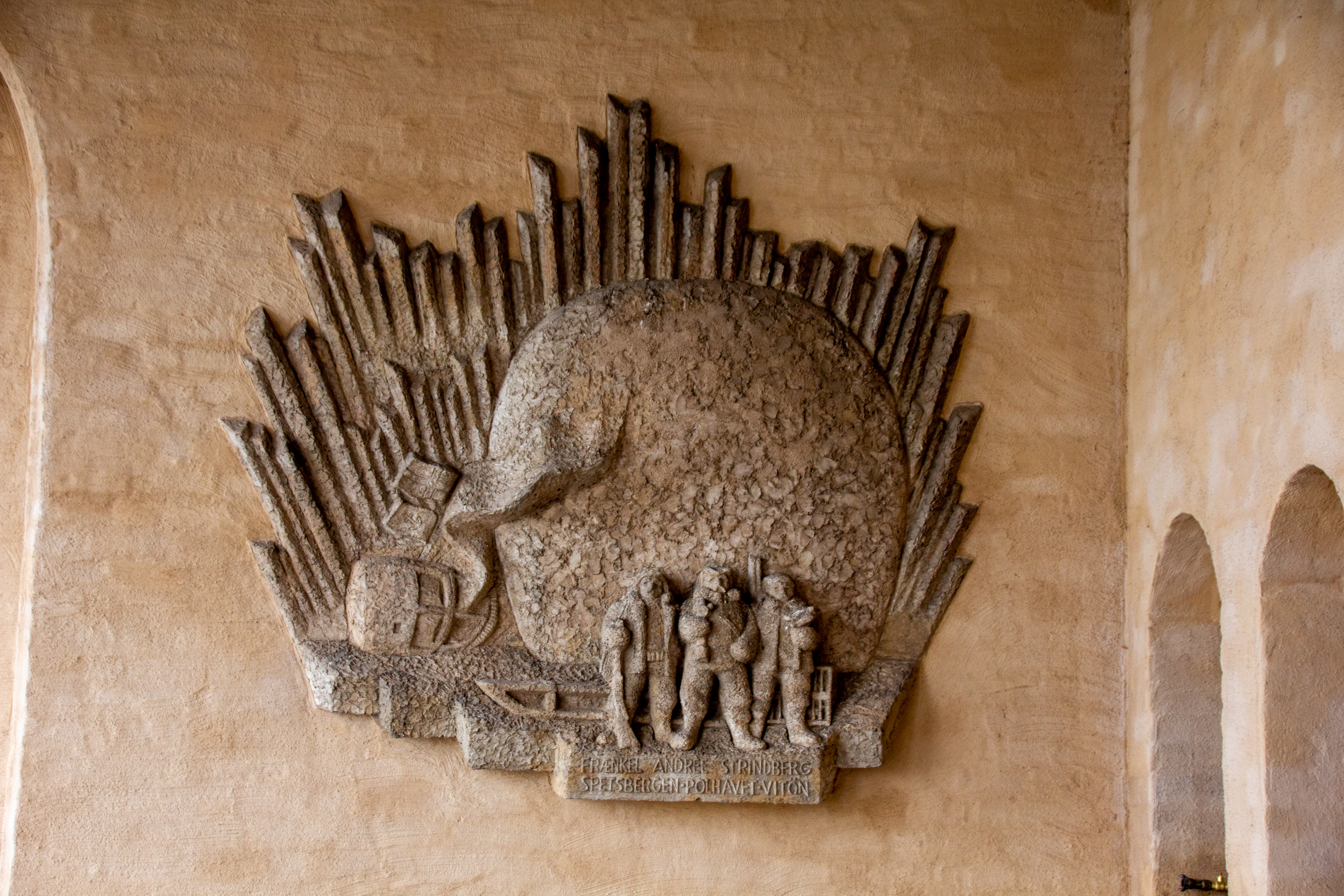
Memorial plaque at Stockholm City Hall

In 1897, Andrée's daring or foolhardy undertaking nourished Swedish patriotic pride and Swedish dreams of taking the scientific lead in the Arctic. The title of Engineer—Ingenjör Andrée—was generally and reverentially used in speaking of him, and expressed high esteem for the late 19th-century ideal of the engineer as a representative of social improvement through technological progress. The three explorers were fêted when they departed and mourned by the nation when they disappeared.

When they were found, the explorers were celebrated for the heroism of their doomed two-month struggle to reach populated areas and were seen as having selflessly perished for the ideals of science and progress. The procession carrying their mortal remains from the ships into Stockholm on 5 October 1930, writes Swedish historian Sverker Sörlin, "must be one of the most solemn and grandiose manifestations of national mourning that has ever occurred in Sweden. One of the rare comparable events is the national mourning that followed the Estonia disaster in the Baltic Sea in September 1994."

More recently, Andrée's heroic motives have been questioned, beginning with Per Olof Sundman's bestselling semi-documentary novel of 1967, The Flight of the Eagle. Sundman portrays Andrée as the victim of the demands of the Swedish media and establishment, and as ultimately motivated by fear rather than courage. Sundman's interpretation of the personalities involved, the blind spots of the Swedish national culture, and the role of the press are reflected in the film adaptation, Flight of the Eagle (1982), based on his novel and directed by Jan Troell. It was nominated for an Academy Award. Historian Edward Guimont has proposed that the 1930 discovery of the expedition's remains influenced H. P. Lovecraft in the writing of At the Mountains of Madness.

Appreciation of Strindberg's role seems to be growing, both for the fortitude with which the untrained and unprepared student kept photographing, in what must have been a more or less permanent state of near-collapse from exhaustion and exposure, and for the artistic quality of the result. Out of the 240 exposed frames that were found on Kvitøya in waterlogged containers, 93 were saved by John Hertzberg at the Royal Institute of Technology in Stockholm, Strindberg's former workplace. In his article, "Recovering the visual history of the Andrée expedition" (2004), Tyrone Martinsson has lamented the traditional focus by previous researchers on the written records—the diaries—as primary sources of information; he renewed his claim for the historical significance of the photographs.

== Sources ==
- "Andréexpeditionen Polar Centre" (in Swedish). Gränna, Sweden: Grenna Museum. Archived from the original on 9 February 2009.
- Andrée, Salomon August; Frænkel, Knut; Strindberg, Nils (1930). Med Örnen mot polen: Andrées polarexpedition år 1897 (in Swedish). Stockholm: Bonnier. SELIBR 1313686. A digital version is available at Project Runeberg (accessed on 16 April 2014). The London edition of the English translation, by Edward Adams-Ray, is The Andrée diaries being the diaries and records of S. A. Andrée, Nils Strindberg and Knut Fraenkel written during their balloon expedition to the North Pole in 1897 and discovered on White Island in 1930, together with a complete record of the expedition and discovery; with 103 illustr. and 6 maps, plans and diagrams (1931); while the New York edition of the same translation is Andrée's Story: The Complete Record of His Polar Flight, 1897, Blue Ribbon Books, 1932.
- "Andrées färder". www.ballong.org (in Swedish). Swedish Balloon Federation.
- Bellows, Alan (2013). "Andrée and the aeronauts' voyage to the top of the world". Damninteresting.com.
- "Andrée biography" (in Swedish). Grenna Museum. Archived from the original on 1 March 2007.
- Kjellström, Rolf (1999). Wråkberg, Urban (ed.). "Andrée-expeditionen och dess undergång – tolkning nu och då". The centennial of S.A. Andrée's North Pole expedition (in Swedish). Stockholm : Center for History of Science, Royal Swedish Academy of Science (Centrum för vetenskapshistoria, Kungl. Vetenskapsakad.), cop. 1999: 44–55. SELIBR 3072403.
- Lundström, Sven (1997). "Vår position är ej synnerligen god-": Andréexpeditionen i svart och vitt (in Swedish). Stockholm: Carlsson. ISBN 91-7203-264-2. SELIBR 7622239. Lundström is the curator of the Andreexpedition Polarcenter in Gränna, Sweden.
- Martinsson, Tyrone (2004). "Recovering the visual history of the Andrée expedition: A case study in photographic research". Research Issues in Art Design and Media (6). ISSN 1474-2365. Archived from the original on 3 October 2011. This paper is based on Martinsson's doctoral dissertation from 2003.
- "The Mystery of Andree", an extensive archive of American daily newspaper articles 1896–1899, from reports of the preparation and the launch to guesswork and rumours about the explorers' fate. Accessed on 5 March 2006.
- Personne, Mark (2000). "Andrée-expeditionens män dog troligen av botulism" (PDF). Läkartidningen (in Swedish). 97 (12). Stockholm: Sveriges läkarförbund: 1427–32. SELIBR 8257938. Archived from the original (PDF) on 26 March 2009.
- Stefánsson, Vilhjálmur (1939). Unsolved mysteries of the Arctic. London: G.G. Harrap & co. ltd. SELIBR 1787910.
- Sörlin, Sverker (1999). Wråkberg, Urban (ed.). "The burial of an era: the home-coming of Andrée as a national event". The centennial of S.A. Andrée's North Pole expedition. Stockholm : Center for History of Science, Royal Swedish Academy of Science (Centrum för vetenskapshistoria, Kungl. Vetenskapsakad.), cop. 1999: 100–11. SELIBR 3072412.
- Sundman, Per Olof (1967). Ingenjör Andrées luftfärd (in Swedish). Stockholm: Norstedt. SELIBR 8216860. Translated in 1970 by Mary Sandbach as The Flight of the Eagle, London: Secker and Warburg. The 1982 film Flight of the Eagle by Jan Troell is based on this novel.
- Tryde, Ernst Adam (1952). De döda på Vitön: sanningen om Andrée (in Swedish). Stockholm: Bonnier. SELIBR 1449025.
