= Salomon August Andrée =

Swedish engineer, physicist, and explorer (1854–1897)

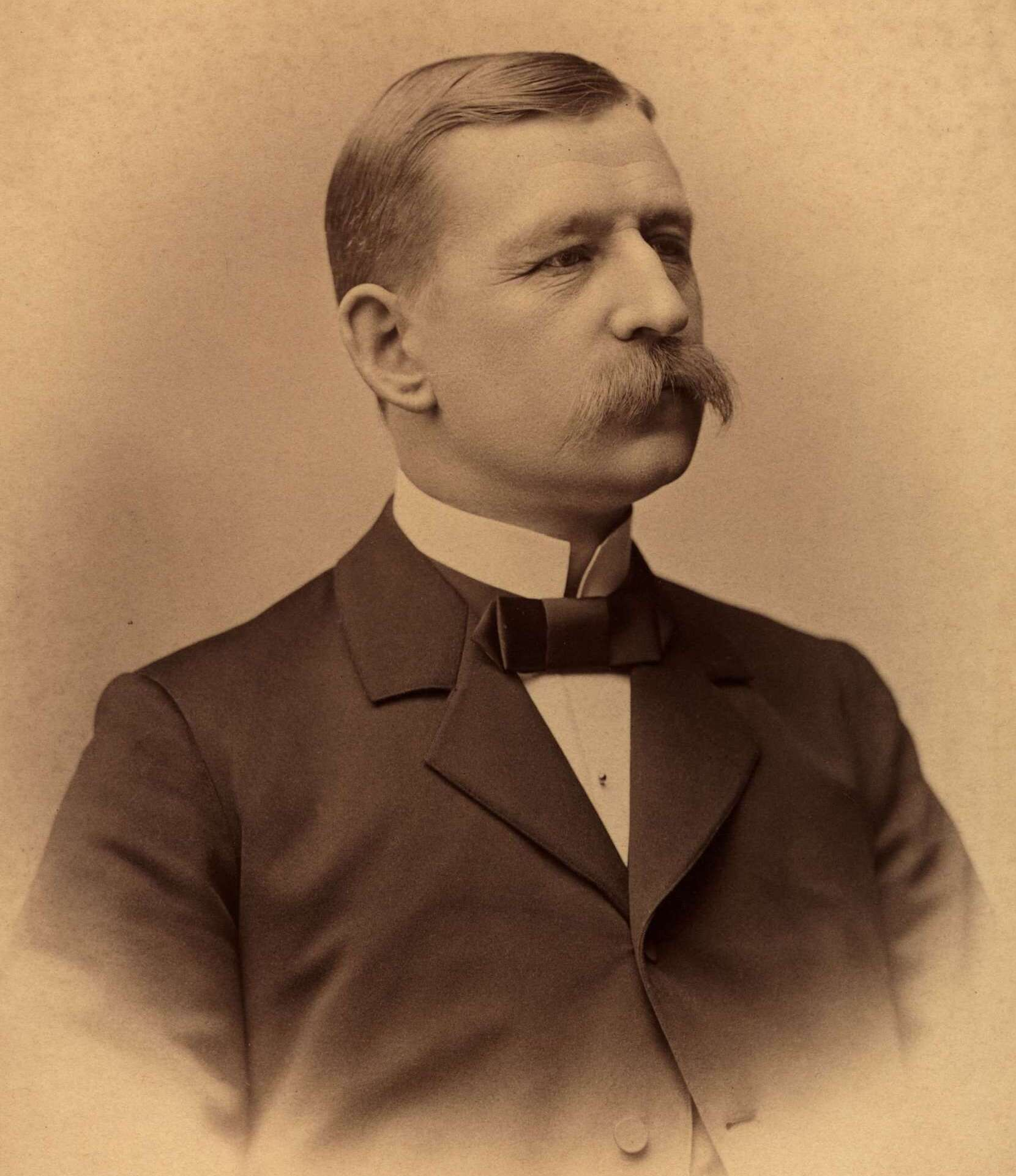
- Salomon August Andrée, 1896.
- Born: October 18, 1854; Gränna, Småland, Sweden
- Died: October 1897 (aged 42–43); Kvitøya, Norway
- Citizenship: Swedish
- Education: Royal Institute of Technology
- Occupation: civil servant (Patent Office)
- Known for: Arctic Balloon Expedition of 1897

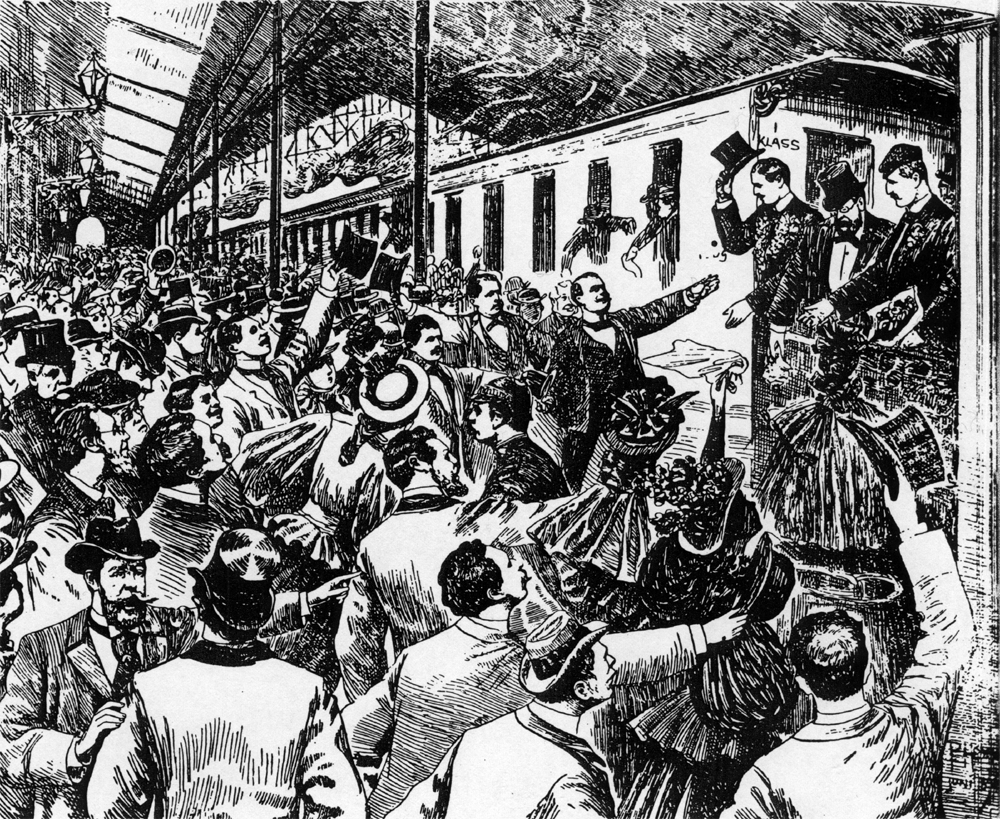
Drawing from the newspaper Aftonbladet showing the festivities when the expedition leaves Stockholm for the first try to launch the balloon, in 1896

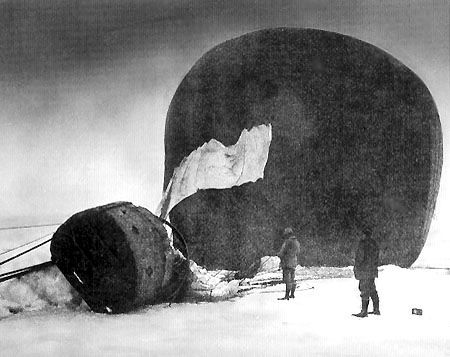
Örnen (The Eagle) shortly after its descent onto pack ice. Photographed by Nils Strindberg, the exposed plate was among those recovered in 1930.

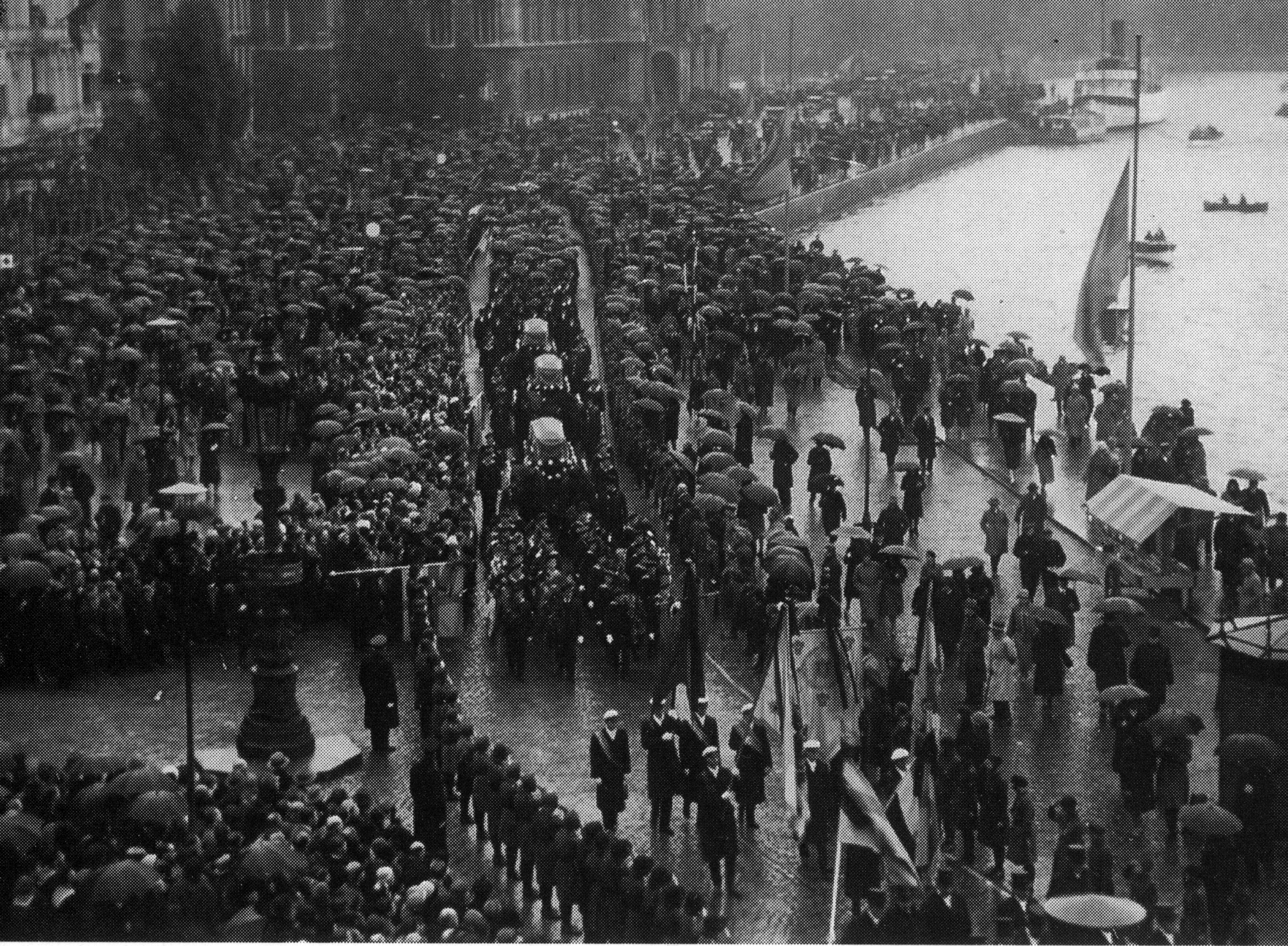
The grand homecoming of the bodies from the polar expedition to Stockholm, October 5, 1930

Salomon August Andrée (18 October 1854 – October 1897), during his lifetime most often known as S. A. Andrée, was a Swedish engineer, physicist, aeronaut and polar explorer who died while leading an attempt to reach the Geographic North Pole by hydrogen balloon. The balloon expedition was unsuccessful in reaching the Pole and resulted in the deaths of all three of its participants.

== Early life and influences ==
Andrée was born in the small town of Gränna, Sweden; as a child, he was very close to his mother, especially following the death of his father in 1870. He attended the Royal Institute of Technology in Stockholm, earning a degree in mechanical engineering in 1874.

In 1876, Andrée traveled to the United States, where he attended the Centennial Exposition in Philadelphia, and was employed as a janitor at the event's Swedish Pavilion. While on this trip, Andrée spent his free time reading a book on trade winds and also met with an American balloonist, John Wise. This meeting sparked a lifelong fascination with aeronautics and balloon-travel. Following his time in Pennsylvania, Andrée returned to Sweden and opened a machine shop, where he worked until 1880, which proved to be less than successful; he soon looked for other employment.

From 1880 to 1882, Andrée was an assistant at the KTH Royal Institute of Technology, Stockholm; from 1882 into 1883, he participated in a Swedish scientific expedition to Spitsbergen, an island in Norway's Arctic Svalbard archipelago, led by Nils Ekholm, where he was responsible for the observations regarding air electricity. From 1885 until his death, he was employed by the Swedish patent office. From 1891 to 1894, he was also a liberal member of the Stockholm city council. As a scientist, Andrée published scientific journals on air electricity, conduction of heat, and various new inventions. A keen friend of Jonas Patrik Ljungström, he notably educated the former's sons, Birger and Fredrik Ljungström.

Andrée's views on life were that of the natural sciences, as he entirely lacked interest in the arts or literature. He was a believer in industrial and technical development and claimed that the emancipation of women would come as a consequence of technical progress.

== Expedition to the North Pole ==
Supported by the Royal Swedish Academy of Sciences and funded by various donors (such as King Oscar II and Alfred Nobel), Andrée's polar exploration project was a subject of enormous interest, being seen as a brave and patriotic scheme.

The North Pole expedition made an initial attempt to launch the balloon, the Örnen (eagle), in the summer of 1896 from Danes Island, to the west of the Svalbard Archipelago, but the winds did not permit the expedition to start. When Andrée next tried, on 11 July 1897, together with his companions, engineer Knut Frænkel and photographer Nils Strindberg (a second cousin of playwright August Strindberg), the balloon successfully lifted-off and flew for 65 hours. However, this was not directed or manned flight as, upon lift-off, the gondola had already lost two of its three sliding ropes that were intended to drag on the ice below, thus functioning as a kind of rudder (this was observed by the ground crew). Within ten hours of lift-off, the trio was caught in a powerful windstorm. The heavy gales continued; combined with the rain creating ice on the balloon, the flight was further impeded. It is likely that Andrée realized they would never come near the pole well in advance.

Given these safety and technical issues, the balloon and its three passengers were forced back down onto the ice; surprisingly, the landing was conducted in a semi-controlled manner, allegedly, rather than crash-landing. The trio had covered 295 miles (475 km) and floundered on the pack ice. The expedition was well-equipped for traversing across snow or ice as the men had made sure to bring three sleds and a boat; they also had provisions, such as food and medicines, sufficient for three months. There were also three pre-stocked provisions stores back in northern Svalbard, and one in Franz Josef Land. The men flew eastward to try and reach Franz Josef Land, though after a week, they had redirected westward due to the currents, which moved the ice. They then changed direction towards northern Svalbard. Movement was limited by ice drift and by the craggy surfaces of the pack ice. The three had to pull the sledges themselves, and despite good reserves of food (supplemented by hunting polar bear), the efforts against the moving, uneven ice wore them out.

They reached land in early October after more than two months on the ice, setting foot on Kvitøya (White Island), just east of Svalbard. They perished there, probably within two weeks after landfall. Most modern writers agree that Nils Strindberg died within a week of arrival: he was buried among the rocks (though no marker was placed on his grave) whilst the bodies of the other two men were later found in the tent.

Diary notes and observations end just days after the trio had landed on Kvitøya; up until that point, entries had been maintained, even in difficult conditions, which seems to indicate a critical change occurring. It is likely that Strindberg met his end at that point. It has not been possible to establish the reason for his death. Suicide (which would have been possible, at the time, with overdosing on opium) is very unlikely in his case even though by this time all three might have realized it was unlikely they would survive their ordeal. Whatever Strindberg may have felt about the outcome of the expedition, it is near certain that he would have judged the option of suicide as treachery to his fellow explorers.

The diary notes of the expedition indicate that all three men were, at times, plagued by digestive troubles, illness and exhaustion during their trek. The group's ultimate cause of death may have had to do with their hunting of and consumption of undercooked polar bear, which are likely to have been carrying Trichinella (an internal parasitic worm which causes trichinosis); Trichinella were found in the remains of a polar bear at the spot examined by the Danish physician Ernst Tryde, as published in a book, The Dead on White Island (1952). According to Tryde, there is no doubt that the men became infected with the parasite, at some point, during their polar trek, though the exact timing is unclear; normally, humans develop immunity to trichinosis, provided they survive the first wave of infection. When they arrived at White Island the men were suffering from recurrent diarrhoea. A plausible indication of this is that some of the provisions they brought ashore (obviously after a few days of scouting to the west) were unloaded and left near the water and not carried to a safer place near the camp.

In contrast, Arctic explorer Vilhjalmur Stefansson theorized in his book Unsolved Mysteries of the Arctic that Strindberg had likely died while hunting a polar bear, perhaps from slipping and drowning, and Andrée and Frænkel had asphyxiated on carbon monoxide from a malfunctioning stove while cooking in their tent. To account for the amount of unused fuel in the stove, Stefansson referred to his own experiences with malfunctioning stoves that required regular pumping to keep burning. In his opinion, the trio had not lost hopes of being saved, but they had made many critical errors, and would have ultimately perished from a number of causes.

== Aftermath ==
Until Andrée's last camp was found in 1930, the expedition's fate was the subject of myth and rumours. At the time of the disappearance, it was noted that a heavy storm had been raging and that the balloon had lost its steering lines at departure. This led experienced polar explorers to surmise that the expedition could not have gotten very far and had probably been forced down onto the ice. In 1898, eleven months after Andrée's first sighting of White Island (which he called New Iceland), a Swedish polar expedition led by A. G. Nathorst passed offshore just 1 kilometre (0.6 mi) from the camp, but bad weather prevented their landing. The remnants of the camp were finally found in 1930 by the Norwegian Bratvaag Expedition, which picked up remains, including two bodies. A month later the ship M/K Isbjørn, hired by a newspaper, made additional finds, among them the third body. Notebooks, diaries, photographic negatives, the boat, various utensils and other objects were recovered. The homecoming of the bodies of Andrée and his colleagues, Strindberg and Frænkel, was a national event. King Gustaf V delivered an oration and the explorers received a funeral with great honours. The three explorers were cremated and their ashes interred together at the cemetery Norra begravningsplatsen, Stockholm.

== Modern assessments ==
Starting in the 1960s, Andrée's status as a national hero was increasingly questioned and a more critical, skeptical view began to prevail, in a way not unlike the changing assessment of Robert Falcon Scott's South polar journey. Emphasis has been placed on the view that the expedition was bound to fail, and that Andrée refused to take in information that questioned the expedition's feasibility. He also had limited flight experience with large balloons, and none in Arctic conditions. Andrée has been seen as a manipulator of the national emotions of his age, bringing a meaningless death on himself and his two companions. (Note: This assessment is discussed in several contexts in Vår position är ej synnerligen god... by Andrée specialist Sven Lundström.) in Gränna, Sweden (see for example p. 131), and it is also a key underpinning of P-O. Sundman's two books, Ingenjör Andrées luftfärd and Ingen fruktan, intet hopp. Several modern writers, following Per Olof Sundman's portrayal of Andrée in the semidocumentary novel Flight of the Eagle (Ingenjör Andrées luftfärd, 1967), have speculated that by the time of the departure for Svalbard in 1897, Andrée had become a prisoner of his own successful funding campaign and of heightened national expectations. As such, they posit that he may have felt incapable of backing out or admitting faults in his plans in front of the press.

== Legacy ==
Andrée Land in Greenland was named after him by Swedish Arctic explorer A.G. Nathorst.

The Italian poet Giovanni Pascoli wrote a poem about Andrée's expedition and death.

Andrée's writings were adapted into the song cycle The Andrée Expedition by the American composer Dominick Argento, written for the Swedish baritone Håkan Hagegård. Swedish composer Klas Torstensson's opera "Expeditionen" (1994–99) is also based on Andrée's story.

Historian Edward Guimont has proposed that the 1930 discovery of the expedition's remains influenced H. P. Lovecraft in the writing of At the Mountains of Madness.

In 1982, the Swedish filmmaker Jan Troell directed a film based on Sundman's book, Flight of the Eagle.

In 2010, the American rock group Brian's Escape created a seven-track concept album inspired by Andrée's adventures entitled The Journey: An Account of S. A. Andrée's Arctic Expedition of 1897.

The 2010 novel Strindberg's Star by Swedish writer Jan Wallentin revolves around the story of the expedition. The explorers reportedly found two relics which opened a portal to the Norse underworld and set off a chain of events connecting both world wars and the modern day with ancient Norse myths.

In 2012, English band The Greenland Choir included a song Reindeer, 1897 on their E.P. Here we are, wandering around like ghosts, which was inspired by Andrée.

In 2013, UK/ Norway theatre company New International Encounter (NIE) created a show charting the story of the ice balloon in co-production with The North Wall Oxford and The Key Theatre. North North North premiered at The Key Theatre, Peterborough on May 9, 2013, and toured across the UK and internationally.

A 2013 novel Expeditionen : min kärlekshistoria by Swedish writer Bea Uusma retells the story from the point of view of Strindberg's love for his fiancée, Anna Charlier.
