= Henri Lachambre =

French balloon manufacturer

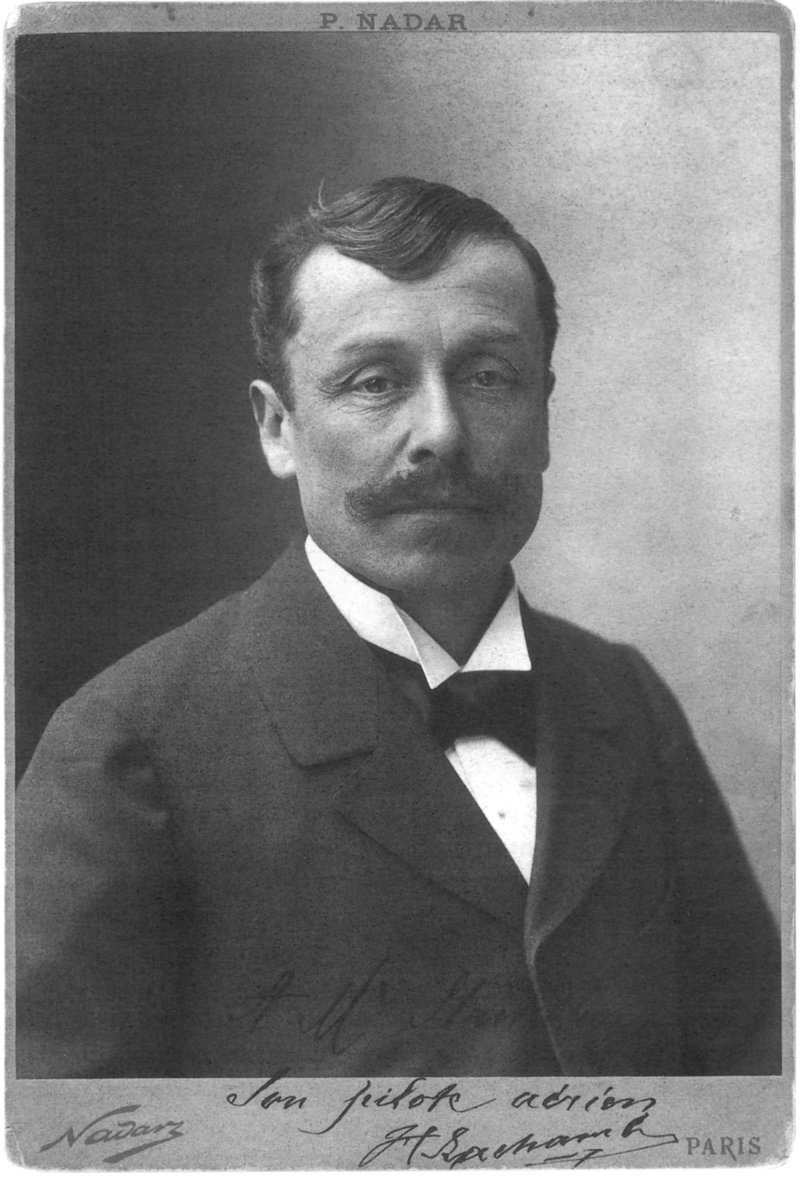
- Studio portrait of Henri Lachambre by Nadar
- Born: 30 December 1846; Vagney, Vosges, France
- Died: 12 June 1904 (aged 57); France
- Occupations: balloon manufacturer, aeronaut
- Known for: manufacturing balloons; work with S. A. Andrée and Alberto Santos-Dumont

Henri Lachambre (30 December 1846, Vagney, Vosges – 12 June 1904) was a French manufacturer of balloons. His factory was in the Paris suburb Vaugirard. He also participated in ballooning himself, carrying out 500 ascents.

Lachambre supplied balloons to both the US Signal Corps and the ill-fated arctic mission of S. A. Andrée in 1897. He also worked with the Brazilian aviation pioneer Alberto Santos-Dumont, taking him for his first balloon ascent and going on to construct his first balloon in 1898 and later the envelopes for his dirigibles.

Together with his nephew Alexis Machuron Lachambre wrote a book about Andrée's expedition, Au pôle nord en ballon (Imprimerie Nilsson, 1897, 250 pages), which was quickly translated into Swedish, English, French, German, Italian, Dutch and Polish.

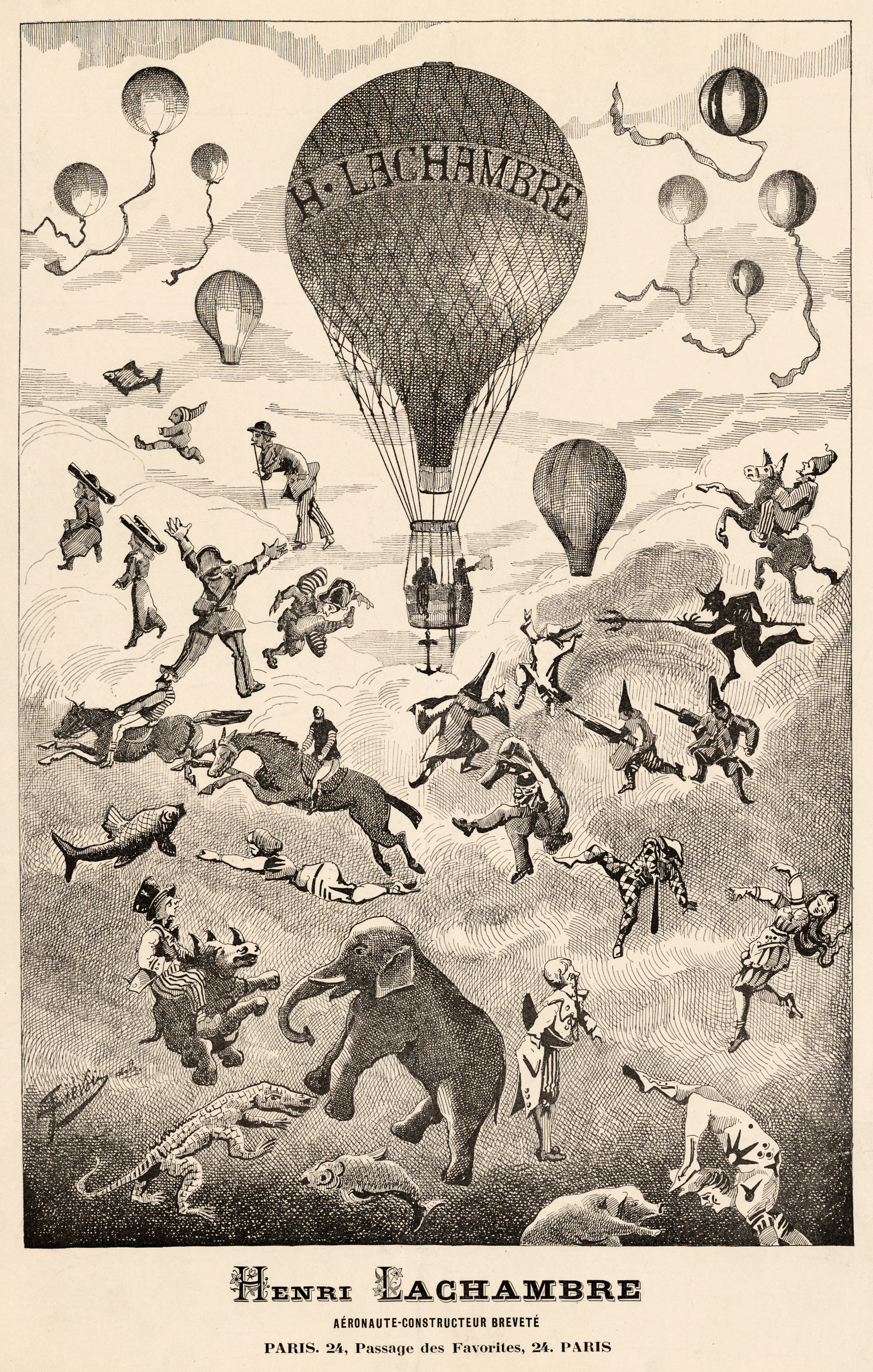
An advert for the business of 19th-century balloon-maker Henri Lachambre, depicts a balloon rising out of a mass of animals and other balloons.

== Notes ==
1. Parkinson, R. J. (1960) "United States Signal Corps Balloons, 1871-1902" in Military Affairs
