= Knut Frænkel =

Swedish engineer and arctic explorer

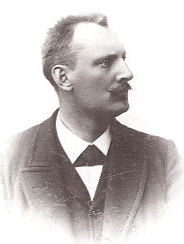
- Born: February 14, 1870; Karlstad, Sweden
- Died: October 10, 1897 (aged 27); Kvitøya, Norway
- Education: Royal Institute of Technology
- Occupations: Engineer and Arctic explorer
- Known for: Andrée's Arctic balloon expedition

Knut Hjalmar Ferdinand Frænkel (14 February 1870 – c. 10 October 1897) was a Swedish engineer and arctic explorer who perished in the Arctic balloon expedition of 1897 of S. A. Andrée in 1897.

== Biography ==
Frænkel was born in Karlstad, Sweden. He was a major in the Road and Waterway Construction Service Corps, and grew up in mountainous Jämtland in the western middle part of Sweden, where he acquired an interest in outdoor activities and sports. He later went to the Palmgren School in Stockholm and graduated with a civil engineering degree from the Royal Institute of Technology in 1896, and was preparing himself to enter the Army engineers when the chance came up in 1897 to join S. A. Andrée's planned balloon expedition to the North Pole. The third participant was Nils Strindberg. Frænkel replaced the meteorologist Nils Gustaf Ekholm, who had participated in the preparations but dropped out at the last moment, critical of the construction of the balloon.

During the balloon expedition, Frænkel was responsible for writing the detailed protocols of everything done by the participants. After the landing on the ice, he wrote the meteorological journal and was responsible for camp arrangements. Having drifted for weeks, they reached the southwest of Kvitøya (White Island) and landed on 5 October 1897. They made a camp on a nearby height where they perished a few days later. Strindberg died first and was buried by Andrée and Frænkel shortly afterwards among the rocks (though no marker was placed on his grave).

The remains of the expedition were found by accident by the Norwegian Bratvaag Expedition on 6 August 1930. Andrée and Strindberg were found and brought home, while Frænkel's body was found only at a returning expedition in early September when more of the snow and ice had melted. Frænkel and the other two explorers received a funeral with great honors. After cremation, their ashes were interred together at the cemetery Norra begravningsplatsen in Stockholm.

== Other sources ==
- W:son Ahlmann, Hans (1964–1966). "Knut H F Frænkel". Svenskt biografiskt lexikon (in Swedish). Vol. 16. National Archives of Sweden. p. 408.
