= Per Olof Sundman =

Swedish politician (1922–1992)

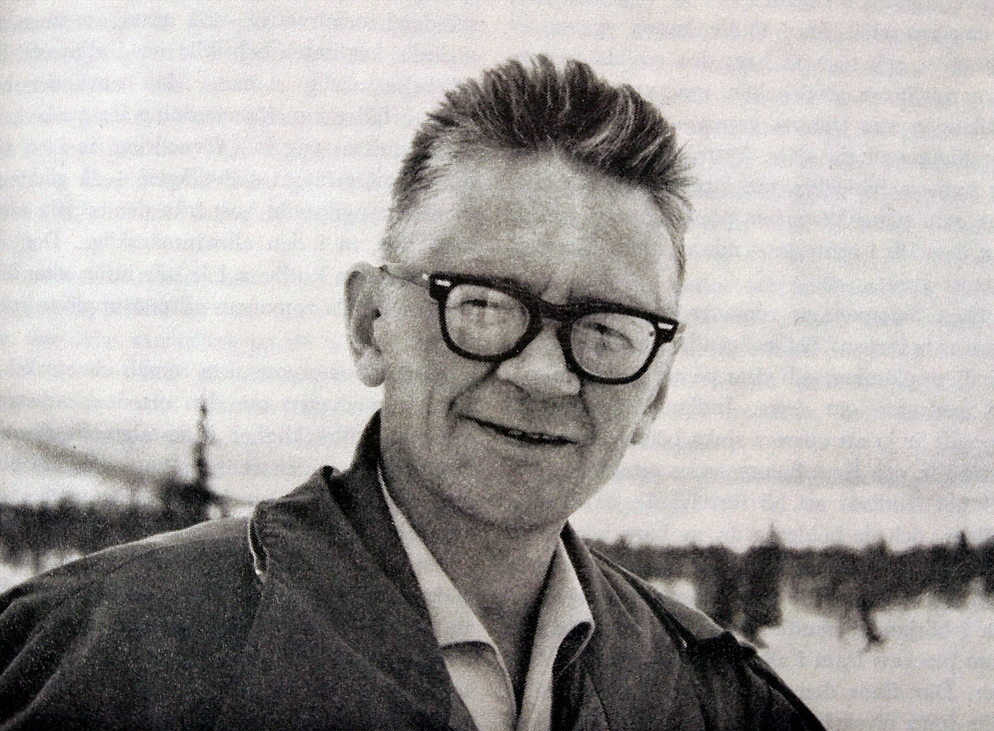
- Per Olof Sundman
- Born: Per Olof Sundman; 4 September 1922; Vaxholm, Sweden
- Died: 9 October 1992 (aged 70); Stockholm, Sweden
- Writing career
- Period: 1957–1992
- Notable work: Flight of the Eagle

Per Olof Sundman (4 September 1922, Vaxholm – 9 October 1992, Stockholm) was a Swedish writer and politician.

Sundman was born in Vaxholm. After World War II, Sundman joined the Centre Party and in 1969 he was elected to the Swedish Parliament, the Riksdag.

Per Olof Sundman released his first book in 1957 and soon became a successful writer, even internationally. His writing has been compared to that of Ernest Hemingway. In 1968, Sundman received the Nordic Council's Literature Prize for his 1967 novel Ingenjör Andrées luftfärd (The Flight of the Eagle) about the failed attempt of S.A. Andrée to reach the North Pole by a hydrogen balloon.

In 1975 Sundman was elected to the Swedish Academy, on seat 6. Tomas Riad currently holds his seat.

His 1967 novel Flight of the Eagle was filmed and directed by Jan Troell, and released in 1982. The film starring Max von Sydow was in 1983 nominated for an Oscar for best foreign-language film of the year.

== Sources ==
- Hinchliffe, Ian (1995). The documentary novel: fact, fiction, or fraud? : an examination of three Scandinavian examples of the documentary novels from the 1960s and 1970s. Boston Spa: British Library Document Supply Centre. Libris 1966896.
- McGregor, Rick (1994). Per Olof Sundman and the Icelandic sagas: a study of narrative method. Skrifter utgivna av Litteraturvetenskapliga institutionen vid Göteborgs universitet, 0348-4653; 26. Göteborg: Litteraturvetenskapliga institutionen, Univ. Libris 7756431. ISBN 91-86270-33-8.
- Warme, Lars G. (1984). Per Olof Sundman: writer of the North. Contributions to the study of world literature, 0738-9345; 7. Westport, Conn.: Greenwood Press. Libris 4802505. ISBN 0-313-24346-8.

Cultural offices
Preceded by Olle Hedberg	Swedish Academy, Seat No 6; 1975–92	Succeeded by Birgitta Trotzig
