= Jan Wallentin =

Swedish journalist and writer (born 1970)

Jan Thomas Valentin Wallentin (born 8 April 1970 in Linköping, Sweden) is a Swedish journalist and writer.

Jan Wallentin has worked as a news journalist for Sveriges Television. He made his debut as a novelist in October 2010 with the book Strindberg's Star, noted for having been sold to 16 countries before it had even been published in Swedish. In the fall of 2019, he came out with the weightless Jesper Fock, a novel about the depression epidemic, the climate disaster and the meaning of life.

== Bibliography ==
- Strindbergs stjärna (Strindberg's Star), Bonniers 2010, ISBN 978-91-0-012451-9
