= Ghost Stories (magazine) =

American pulp magazine

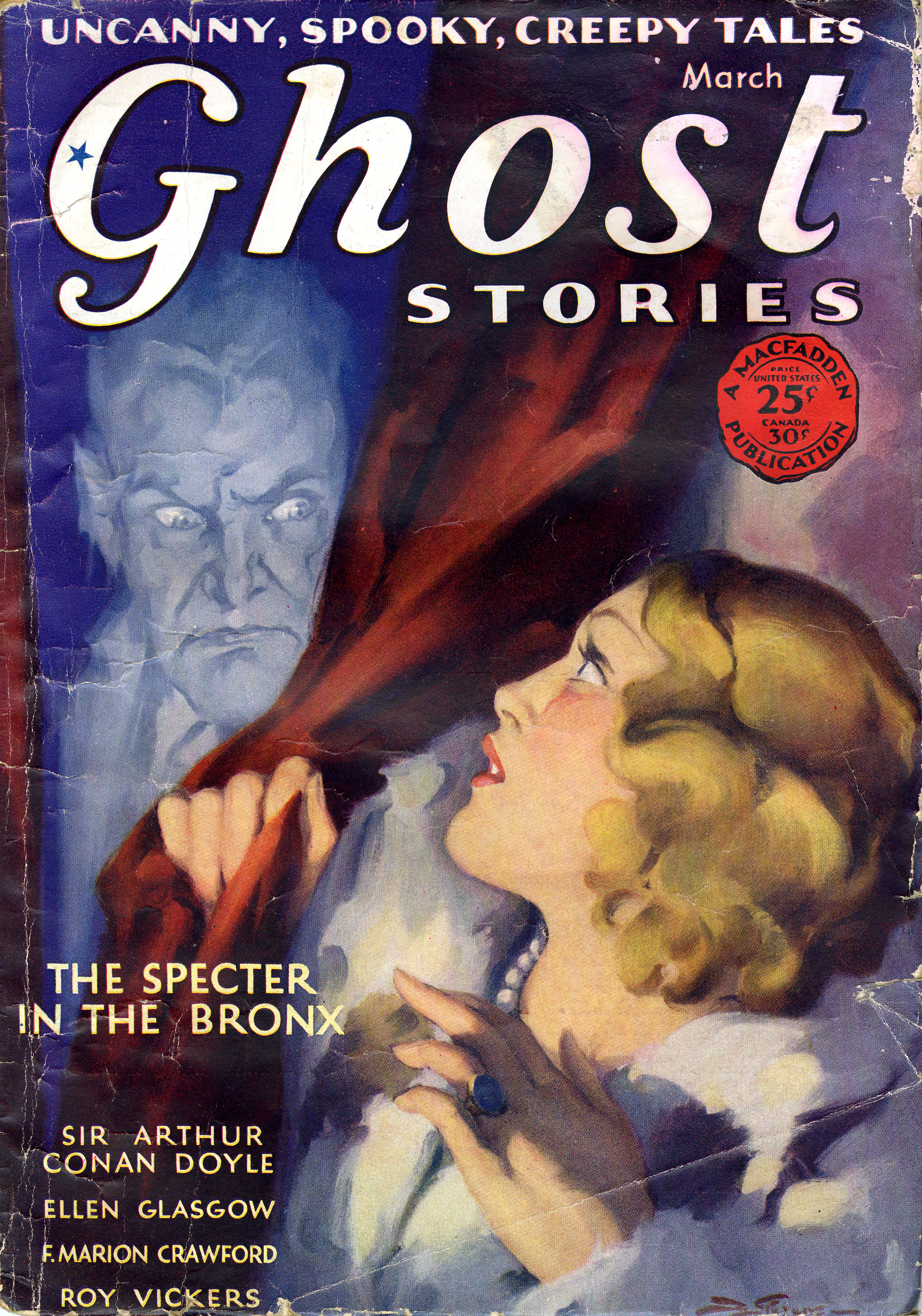
- Cover of the March 1930 issue
- First issue: July 1926; 99 years ago
- Final issue: January 1932
- Country: USA
- Language: English

Ghost Stories was an American pulp magazine that published 64 issues between 1926 and 1932. It was one of the earliest competitors to Weird Tales, the first magazine to specialize in the fantasy and occult fiction genre. It was a companion magazine to True Story and True Detective Stories, and focused almost entirely on stories about ghosts, many of which were written by staff writers but presented under pseudonyms as true confessions. These were often accompanied by faked photographs to make the stories appear more believable. Ghost Stories also had original and reprinted contributions, including works by Robert E. Howard, Carl Jacobi, and Frank Belknap Long. Among the reprints were Agatha Christie's "The Last Seance" (with the title "The Woman Who Stole a Ghost"), several stories by H. G. Wells, and Charles Dickens's "The Signal-Man". Initially successful, the magazine began to lose readers and in 1930 was sold to Harold Hersey. Hersey was unable to reverse the magazine's decline, and publication of Ghost Stories ceased in early 1932.

== Publishing history and contents ==
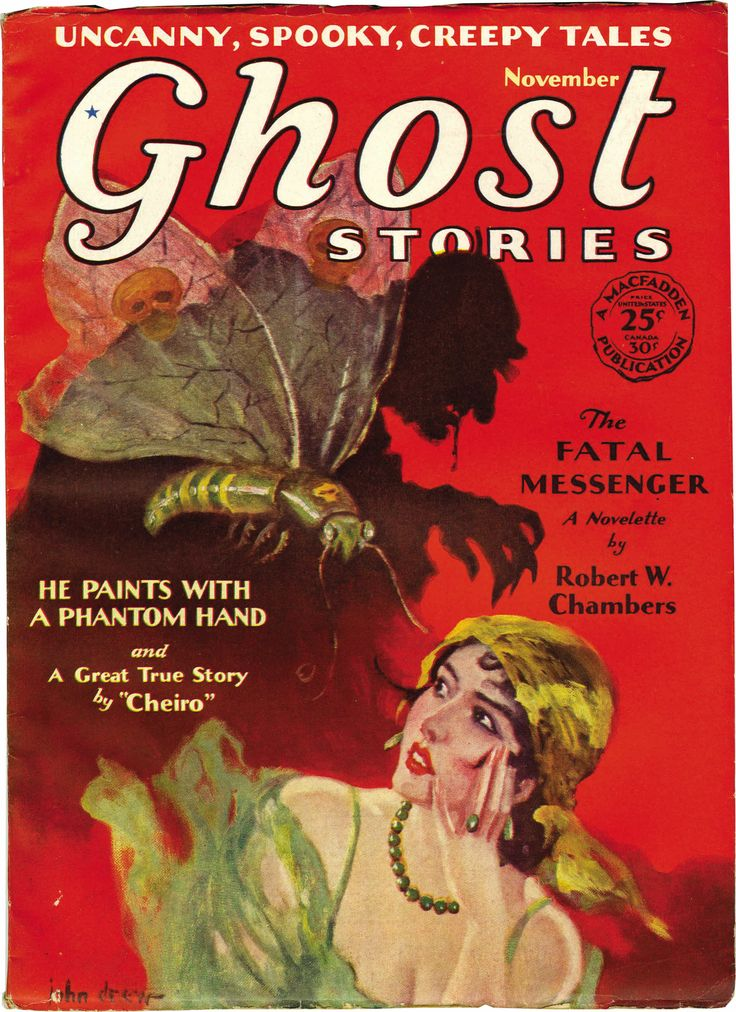
Cover of the November 1929 issue

Fantasy and occult fiction had often appeared in popular magazines prior to the twentieth century, but the first magazine to specialize in the genre, Weird Tales, did not appear until 1923. Ghost Stories, which was launched by Bernarr Macfadden in July 1926, is one of Weird Tales' earliest competitors. Macfadden also published true confession magazines such as True Story; Ghost Stories followed this format, with the contents mostly produced by the publisher's staff writers, and attributed in print to a first-person narrator. The magazine was initially printed on slick paper, which was sufficiently good quality to allow photographs to be used, and many of the stories had accompanying photographs purporting to be of their protagonists. These were replaced by line drawings when the magazine was switched to pulp paper in July 1928. Ghost Stories occasionally printed contributions from outside writers, including "The Apparition in the Prize Ring", by Robert E. Howard, under the pseudonym "John Taverel". Popular writers such as Frank Belknap Long, Hugh B. Cave, Victor Rousseau, Stuart Palmer, and Robert W. Sneddon all sold stories to Ghost Stories, though the quality suffered because of the limited scope the magazine's formula gave them. Carl Jacobi's first published story, "The Haunted Ring", appeared in the final issue. (Note: This was not Jacobi's first sale. "Mive", which he had sold to Weird Tales, did not appear in print until the following month.)

In addition to original material, Ghost Stories ran many reprints, including well-known Victorian ghost stories such as "The Signalman" by Charles Dickens, and "The Open Door" by Mrs. Oliphant. Agatha Christie's "The Last Seance" appeared in the November 1926 issue, with the title "The Woman Who Stole a Ghost", and six stories by H. G. Wells were reprinted, including ghost stories such as "The Red Room" and stories with less obvious appeal to the readership of Ghost Stories, such as "Pollock and the Porroh Man". Arthur Conan Doyle's "The Captain of the Polestar" appeared in the April 1931 issue, and he also contributed a non-fiction piece, "Houdini's Last Escape", which appeared in March 1930.

Macfadden set up an arrangement with Walter Hutchinson, a U.K. publisher, to exchange suitable material with The Sovereign Magazine and Mystery-Story Magazine, two of Hutchinson's U.K. genre pulps, and many stories appeared on both sides of the Atlantic as a result.

The magazine was initially fairly successful, but sales soon began to fall. In March 1930 Harold Hersey bought the magazine from Macfadden and took over as editor, but he was unable to revive the magazine's fortunes. In 1931 the schedule slipped to bimonthly, and three issues later the magazine ceased publication. The final issue is dated December 1931/January 1932.

== Bibliographic details ==
	Jan	Feb	Mar	Apr	May	Jun	Jul	Aug	Sep	Oct	Nov	Dec
1926							1/1	1/2	1/3	1/4	1/5	1/6
1927	2/1	2/2	2/3	2/4	2/5	2/6	3/1	3/2	3/3	3/4	3/5	3/6
1928	4/1	4/2	4/3	4/4	4/5	4/6	5/1	5/2	5/3	5/4	5/5	5/6
1929	6/1	6/2	6/3	6/4	6/5	6/6	7/1	7/2	7/3	7/4	7/5	7/6
1930	8/1	8/2	8/3	8/4	8/5	8/6	9/1	9/2	9/3	9/4	9/5	9/6
1931	10/1	10/2	10/3	10/4	10/5	10/6	11/1	11/2		11/3		11/4
1932	11/4											
Issues of Ghost Stories, showing volume/issue number. The sequence of editors is not known with enough certainty to be indicated in the table. Note that the last issue (volume 11 number 4) was dated December 1931/January 1932 and spans two rows in the table.

Ghost Stories was published by Bernarr Macfadden, under the imprint Constructive Publishing Co., of Dunellen, New Jersey, until the March 1930 issue, after which it was taken over by Good Story Magazine Co. of New York, which was run by Harold Hersey, who had earlier edited The Thrill Book. The editorial director of Constructive Publishing during MacFadden's ownership was Fulton Oursler; his assistants, Harry A. Keller, W. Adolphe Roberts, George Bond, Daniel Wheeler, and Arthur B. Howland, each (in that order) spent close to a year editing, though the dates of transition between them are not known. When Hersey took over, his assistant was Stuart Palmer.

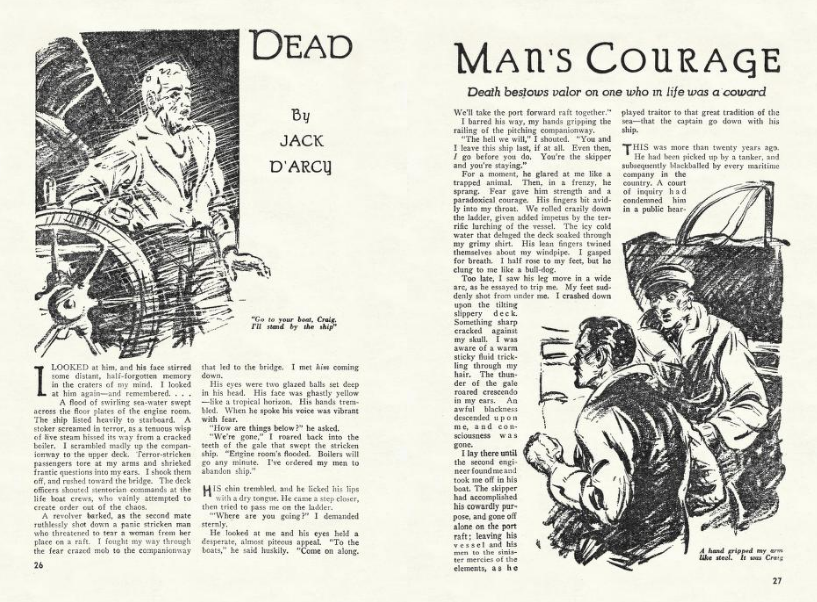
Two pages (26–27) of magazine (October 1930, vol. 9, no. 4) featuring "Dead Man's Courage"

The magazine began as a slick, in bedsheet format and switched to pulp layout with the July 1928 issue; it remained as a pulp until the end of its run with the exception of eight issues in large pulp format from April to December 1929. There are 64 issues, with six issues per volume, except for the last volume which included only four issues. The price was 25 cents throughout; it had 128 pages when pulp-sized, and 96 pages when a bedsheet and when it was a large pulp.

No anthologies have selected their contents solely from Ghost Stories, but two magazines have done so: True Twilight Tales and Prize Ghost Stories, both published by League Publications, a subsidiary of the company that owned the rights to the original stories, MacFadden-Bartell. Prize Ghost Stories published one issue, dated 1963, and True Twilight Tales published two, dated Fall 1963 and Spring 1964. Both magazines were in large pulp format, with 96 pages, priced at 50 cents. The first issue of True Twilight Tales was edited by Helen Gardiner, who probably also was the editor of Prize Ghost Stories; the second issue of True Twilight Tales was edited by John M. Williams. There may have been other issues of both titles, as neither are numbered.

== Sources ==
- Ashley, Mike (1985a). "Ghost Stories". In Tymn, Marshall B.; Ashley, Mike (eds.). Science Fiction, Fantasy and Weird Fiction Magazines. Westport, Connecticut: Greenwood Press. pp. 315–317. ISBN 0-313-21221-X.
- Ashley, Mike (1985b). "Prize Ghost Stories". In Tymn, Marshall B.; Ashley, Mike (eds.). Science Fiction, Fantasy and Weird Fiction Magazines. Westport, Connecticut: Greenwood Press. pp. 482–483. ISBN 0-313-21221-X.
- Ashley, Mike (1985c). "True Twilight Tales". In Tymn, Marshall B.; Ashley, Mike (eds.). Science Fiction, Fantasy and Weird Fiction Magazines. Westport, Connecticut: Greenwood Press. pp. 678–679. ISBN 0-313-21221-X.
- Ashley, Mike (1997). "Ghost Stories". In Clute, John; Grant, John (eds.). The Encyclopedia of Fantasy. New York: St. Martin's Press, Inc. p. 406. ISBN 0-312-15897-1.
- Hersey, Harold Brainerd (1937). Pulpwood Editor. New York: Frederick A. Stokes Company. OCLC 2770489.
- Locke, John, ed. (2010). Ghost Stories: The Magazine and Its Makers: Volume 1. Elkhorn, CA: Off-Trail Publications. ISBN 978-1-935031-09-3.
- Locke, John, ed. (2010). Ghost Stories: The Magazine and Its Makers: Volume 2. Elkhorn, CA: Off-Trail Publications. ISBN 978-1-935031-13-0.
- Weinberg, Robert (1985). "Strange Tales of Mystery and Terror". In Tymn, Marshall B.; Ashley, Mike (eds.). Science Fiction, Fantasy, and Weird Fiction Magazines. Westport, Connecticut: Greenwood Press. pp. 626–628. ISBN 0-313-21221-X.
