= July 1930 =

Month of 1930

<<	July 1930					>>
Su	Mo	Tu	We	Th	Fr	Sa
		1	2	3	4	5
6	7	8	9	10	11	12
13	14	15	16	17	18	19
20	21	22	23	24	25	26
27	28	29	30	31

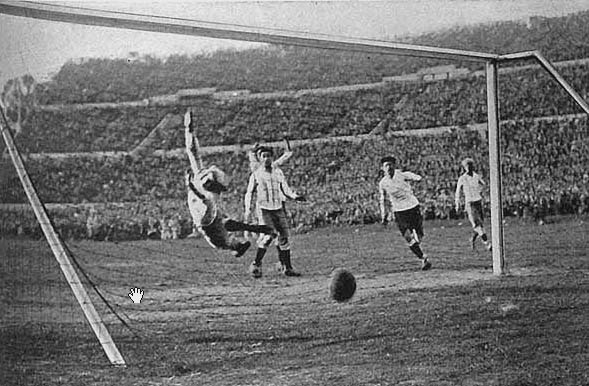
July 30, 1930: Uruguay wins the inaugural FIFA World Cup, defeating Argentina 4 to 2 for the world championship (pictured: Uruguay's Héctor Castro scoring the final goal against Argentina's Juan Botasso)

The following events occurred in July 1930:

== Tuesday, July 1, 1930 ==
- At midnight, the Rhineland began month-long liberation celebrations with ringing bells, music and fireworks.
- In Chicago, Jack Zuta was questioned by police for his alleged involvement with the murder of journalist Jake Lingle. He was released that night and allowed a police escort when a rival gang drove up and fired on the policeman's car in an attempt to assassinate Zuta. A streetcar driver was killed and a night watchman wounded in the ensuing shootout on State Street.
- Born: Moustapha Akkad, Syrian-born filmmaker, in Aleppo (d. 2005)

== Wednesday, July 2, 1930 ==
- Italy imposed a new automobile tariff aimed at American imports.
- Born:
  - Carlos Menem, 47th President of Argentina 1989 to 1999; in Anillaco (d. 2021)
  - Mamie Redman, U.S. baseball player, catcher in the AAGPBL; in Waupun, Wisconsin (d. 2020)
  - Ahmad Jamal, American jazz pianist; as Frederick Russell Jones, in Pittsburgh (d. 2023)

== Thursday, July 3, 1930 ==
- Otto Strasser formed the Kampfgemeinschaft Revolutionärer Nationalsozialisten (Combat League of Revolutionary National Socialists), more commonly known as the Black Front, as a left-wing splinter faction of the Nazi Party after his expulsion from that organization.
- The First Eastern Women's Congress takes place in Damascus, Syria.
- Born: Carlos Kleiber, German-born Austrian conductor, in Berlin (d. 2004)

== Friday, July 4, 1930 ==
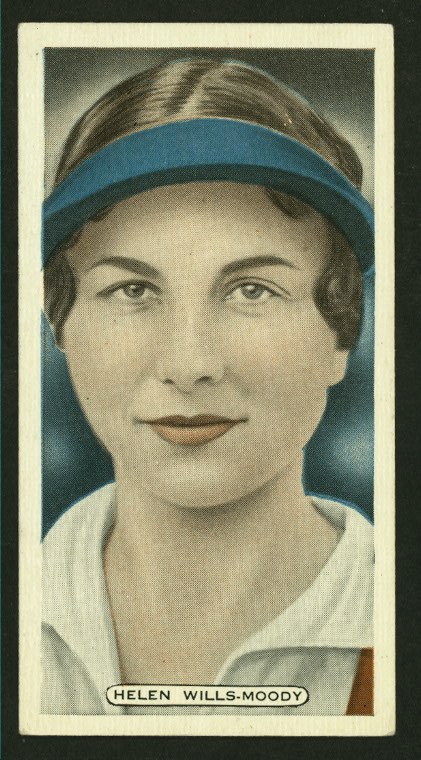
Helen Wills Moody

- Helen Wills Moody defeated Elizabeth Ryan at the Ladies' Singles Final at Wimbledon.
- Thirteen people were killed in a chemical factory explosion in Yorkshire.
- Brothers John and Kenneth Hunter established a new flight endurance record of 553 hours, 41 minutes and 30 seconds, flying a Stinson SM-1 Detroiter over the vicinity of Chicago. The old record, set a year earlier, was bested by 133 hours.
- The state parliament of Thuringia tried to pass a motion of censure against Interior Minister Wilhelm Frick of the Nazi Party, but fell two votes short of the 27 required to force his resignation. Frick had been accused of trying to "Nazify" the Thuringian police force.
- Born:
  - Frunzik Mkrtchyan, celebrated Soviet Armenian stage and film actor; in Leninakan, Armenian SSR (d. 1993)
  - George Steinbrenner, U.S. businessman and principal owner of the New York Yankees baseball team from 1973 until his death; in Rocky River, Ohio (d. 2010)

== Saturday, July 5, 1930 ==
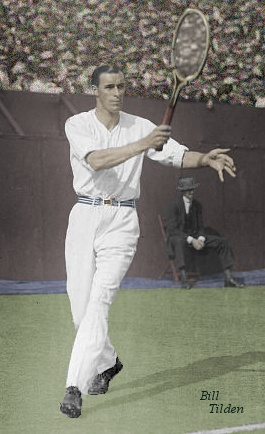
Bill Tilden

- Bill Tilden defeated Wilmer Allison, Jr. in the Gentlemen's Singles Final at Wimbledon.
- Died:
  - Georges Berthoulat, 70, French politician, senator from Seine-et-Oise, after surgery
  - Princess Marie Gasparine of Saxe-Altenburg, 85

== Sunday, July 6, 1930 ==
- Ten people were injured in clashes between police and protestors in the Indian city of Pune. The protesters were making a procession to Yerwada Central Jail to pay homage to their jailed leader Mahatma Gandhi.
- Born: George Armstrong, Canadian ice hockey right wing with 21 seasons in the NHL, all for the Toronto Maple Leafs, enshrinee of the Hockey Hall of Fame; in Skead, Ontario (d. 2021)

== Monday, July 7, 1930 ==
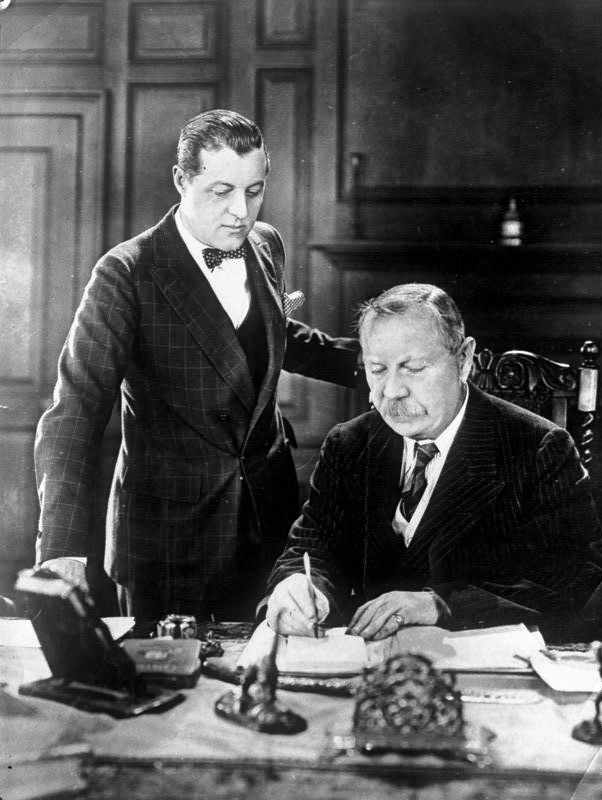
Doyle and his son in 1930

- Sir Arthur Conan Doyle died in the morning at his home in Crowborough. Doyle, the Scottish writer known for creating stories and novels featuring detective Sherlock Holmes, had made arrangements with his immediate family to contact them from the spirit world.
- More than 12,000 members of the Lapua Movement marched on Helsinki demanding legislation against left-wing elements.

== Tuesday, July 8, 1930 ==
- King George V opened India House in London.
- Died: Sir Joseph Ward, 74, Prime Minister of New Zealand from 1906 to 1912 and from 1928 to 1930

== Wednesday, July 9, 1930 ==
- A coal mine explosion killed 151 miners in the German town of Hausdorf (now Jugów in Poland).
- Born:
  - Louis "Buddy" Bregman, American jazz band leader; in Chicago (d. 2017)
  - Patricia Newcomb, American film publicist known primarily for representing Marilyn Monroe; in Washington, D.C.

== Thursday, July 10, 1930 ==
- France pledged to suspend the construction of warships for six months pending the possibility of a new naval conference with Italy.

== Friday, July 11, 1930 ==
- Germany's highest court struck down, as unconstitutional, laws in the state of Thuringia that required the recital of pro-German prayers that had been devised by Thuringian interior minister Wilhelm Frick and included lines such as, "I believe that thou wilt punish the betrayal of Germany and bless the actions of those who seek to free the Fatherland."
- Born: Harold Bloom, American literary critic, in the Bronx (d. 2019)

== Saturday, July 12, 1930 ==
- A streetcar accident in Argentina killed 56 people near Buenos Aires, after the vehicle's operator failed to notice that the moveable bridge for the tracks was up, to allow a crossing of the Río de la Plata. The car plunged into the river and its occupants drowned.
- Bobby Jones won his second straight and record-tying fourth U.S. Open golf title.

== Sunday, July 13, 1930 ==
- The inaugural FIFA World Cup tournament began in Uruguay.
- Almost 6,000 spiritualists gathered in the Royal Albert Hall for a memorial to Sir Arthur Conan Doyle, attended by his relatives. The medium Estelle Roberts relayed a private message to Doyle's widow which she affirmed to be genuine.

== Monday, July 14, 1930 ==
- Italy agreed to join France in a six-month moratorium on warship construction.
- Born: Polly Bergen, actress and singer, in Knoxville, Tennessee (d. 2014)

== Tuesday, July 15, 1930 ==
- Fifteen people were killed and 220 injured in rioting in the Egyptian city of Alexandria instigated by supporters of the Wafd Party.
- Jobless numbers in Great Britain topped 1.9 million.
- Born:
  - Jacques Derrida, French philosopher known for originating the semiotic analysis method of deconstruction, in El Biar, French Algeria (d. 2004)
  - Betty Wagoner, American baseball pitcher for the AAGPBL; in Lebanon, Missouri (d. 2006)
- Died:
  - Leopold Auer, 85, Hungarian violinist, conductor and composer
  - Rudolph Schildkraut, 68, Austrian actor

== Wednesday, July 16, 1930 ==
- The Reichstag defeated Chancellor Heinrich Brüning's budget by a vote of 256–193, but President Paul von Hindenburg invoked Article 48 and forced its passage anyway.

== Thursday, July 17, 1930 ==
- Al Singer knocked out Sammy Mandell in the first round at Yankee Stadium to win boxing's World Lightweight Title.
- British Labour MP John Beckett seized the ceremonial mace and tried to leave the chamber with it as a protest against Fenner Brockway being suspended for trying to force a debate about India. Beckett was intercepted and the mace was retrieved by the Serjeant-at-Arms, then Beckett was himself suspended from the House over the incident.
- Bert Patenaude of the United States became the first player to achieve a hat-trick in World Cup play, during a game against Paraguay. This feat went unnoticed until 2006 when research by FIFA concluded that one of Patenaude's three goals had been wrongly credited to teammate Tom Florie.
- Yugoslavia beat Bolivia 4–0 to knock Brazil out of the 1930 FIFA World Cup

== Friday, July 18, 1930 ==
- The Reichstag, led by the Social Democratic Party, voted 236–221 to demand a revocation of Hindenburg's decrees of July 16. Hindenburg responded by dissolving the Reichstag and calling new elections for September 14, meaning that the Brüning government could use Article 48 to govern in the meantime without requiring parliamentary assent.
- The second Challenge International de Tourisme, an international touring aircraft contest, began in Berlin.

== Saturday, July 19, 1930 ==
- At least 100 people were injured in a train accident in Elizabeth, New Jersey.
- President Hindenburg began a "tour of triumph" in the liberated Rhineland. "The blackest days are over for our country", he told a gathering in Speyer.
- Died: Oku Yasukata, 83, Japanese general

== Sunday, July 20, 1930 ==
- Louis Chiron of Monaco won the European Grand Prix in Belgium.

== Monday, July 21, 1930 ==
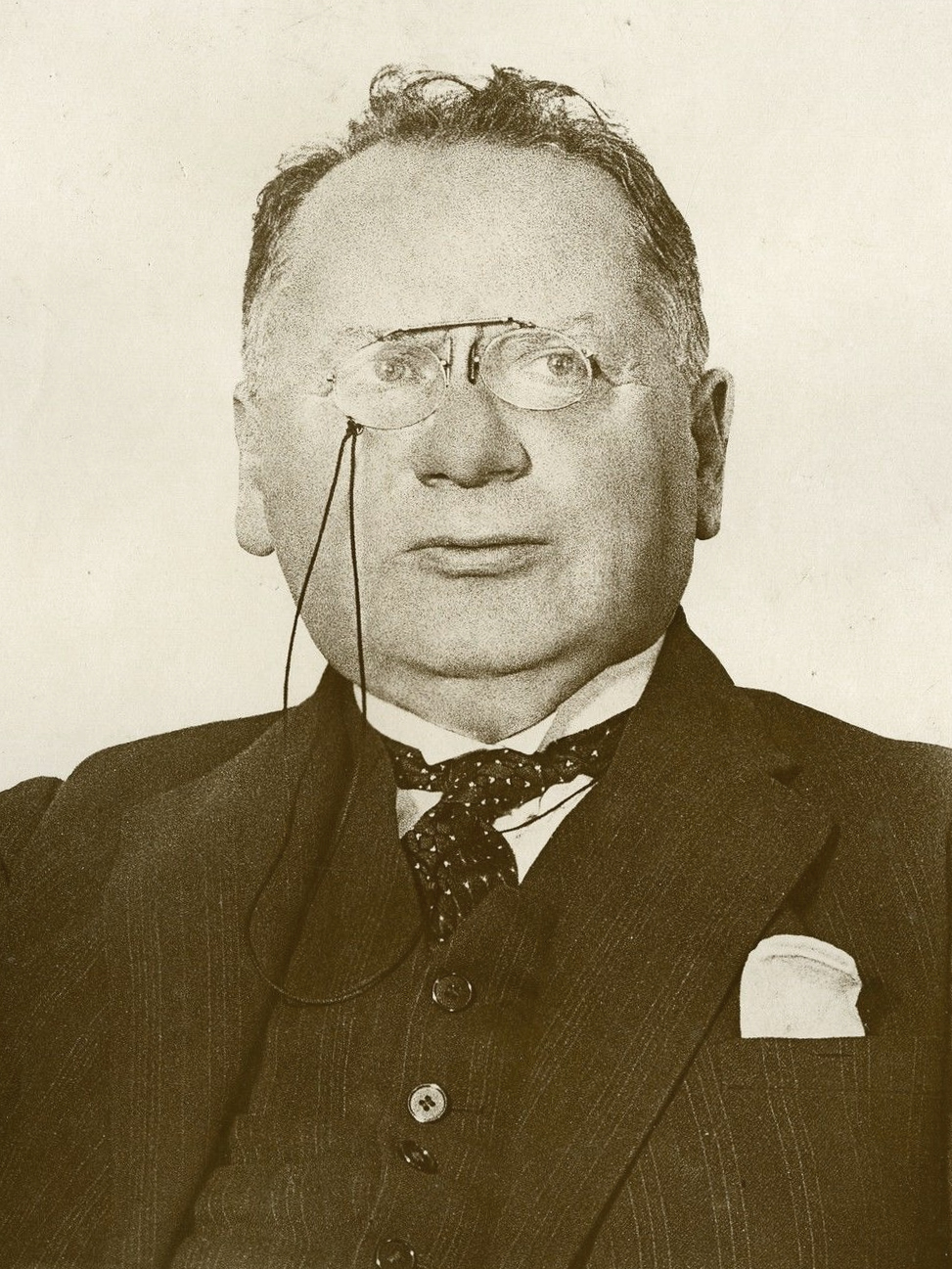
Litvinov

- The U.S. Senate ratified the London Naval Treaty, making the United States the first of the five signatories to do so.
- Maxim Litvinov became the new Foreign Affairs Minister of the Soviet Union after Georgy Chicherin resigned for health reasons.

== Tuesday, July 22, 1930 ==
- Celebrations of the Rhineland's liberation were marred by tragedy after a pontoon bridge collapsed in Koblenz, killing 38 people.
- Born: Jeremy Lloyd, English actor and screenwriter; in Danbury, Essex (d. 2014)

== Wednesday, July 23, 1930 ==
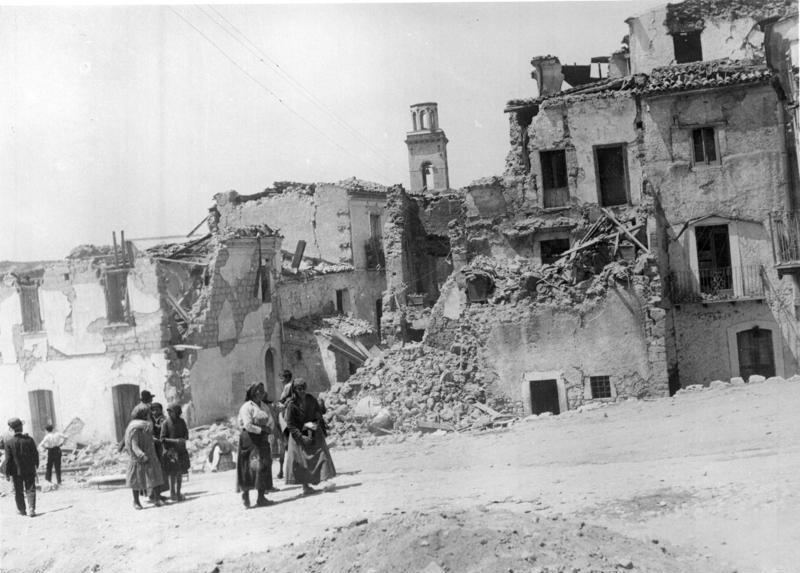
Devastation near Monte Vulture

- The 6.5 magnitude Irpinia earthquake in southern Italy killed 1,404 people.
- President Hindenburg attended a memorial service for the 38 victims of the Koblenz bridge tragedy at the town hall and then cancelled the remaining stops of his Rhineland tour.

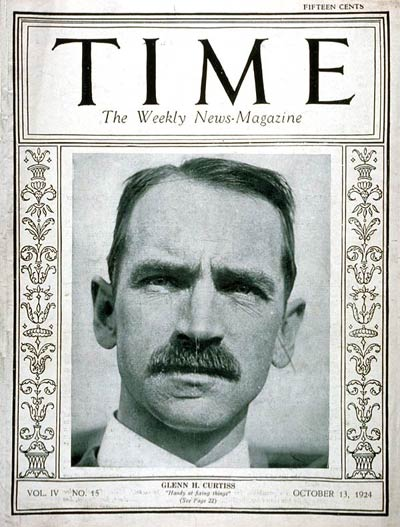
Curtiss in 1924

- Died: Glenn Curtiss, 52, American aviator who founded one of the first airplane manufacturing companies in the world, the Curtiss Aeroplane and Motor Company, died of complications from an emergency appendectomy after being stricken with appendicitis while in a courtroom during the trial of a lawsuit. His death came slightly more than a year after the merger of his company and the Wright Aeronautical Corporation (which had been founded by the Wright Brothers) to form the Curtiss-Wright Corporation.

== Thursday, July 24, 1930 ==
- The British House of Commons approved the London Naval Treaty.

== Friday, July 25, 1930 ==
- The Philadelphia Athletics executed a triple steal twice in the same game against the Cleveland Indians. This is the first and only time this feat has ever been accomplished in the history of major league baseball.
- Born:
  - Maureen Forrester, Canadian operatic contralto; in Montreal (d. 2010)
  - Murray Chapple, New Zealand national team Test cricketer; in Christchurch (d. 1985)

== Saturday, July 26, 1930 ==
- Germany's President Hindenburg used Article 48 to reissue the decrees that the Reichstag had voted to annul on July 18.

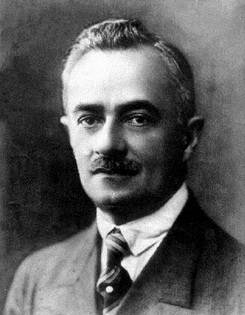
Governor Pessoa

- Died:
  - João Pessoa Cavalcanti de Albuquerque 52, Brazilian politician and Governor of the state of Paraíba, was assassinated. The state capital, formerly called "Parahyba do Norte", was renamed in his honor as João Pessoa, Paraíba
  - Pavlos Karolidis, 81, Greek historian

== Sunday, July 27, 1930 ==
- André Leducq won the Tour de France.
- The German Democratic Party merged with the People's National Reich Association to form the German State Party.
- A tornado in Edirne, Turkey killed 20 people and destroyed thousands of homes.

== Monday, July 28, 1930 ==
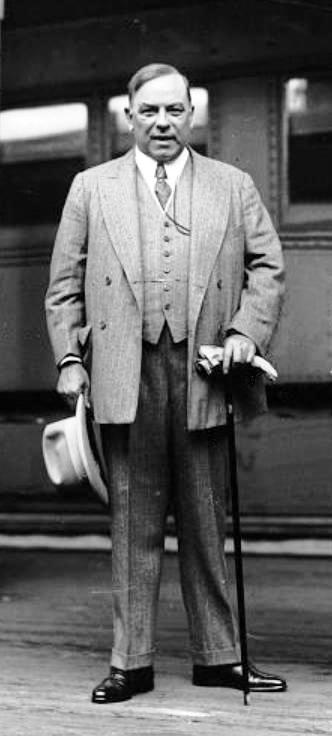
Outgoing Prime Minister King

- Elections for the 245 seats of Canada's House of Commons were held, and the Liberal Party coalition of Prime Minister Mackenzie King lost its majority, winning only 89 seats. The Conservative Party, led by R. B. Bennett, gained 44 seats for 135 overall and an outright majority.
- In the Chinese Civil War, the Communists overran and occupied Changsha.
- Born: Jean Roba, comics author, in Schaerbeek, Belgium (d. 2006)
- Died: Allvar Gullstrand, 68, Swedish ophthalmologist, optician and 1911 Nobel laureate

== Tuesday, July 29, 1930 ==
- The House of Lords passed the London Naval Treaty.
- Born: Paul Taylor, choreographer, in Pittsburgh, Pennsylvania (d. 2018)

== Wednesday, July 30, 1930 ==
- Uruguay defeated Argentina 4–2 in the FIFA World Cup Final at Estadio Centenario in Montevideo.
- Born: Gus Triandos, baseball player, in San Francisco, California (d. 2013)
- Died: Joan Gamper, 52, committed suicide, Swiss footballer and club president

== Thursday, July 31, 1930 ==
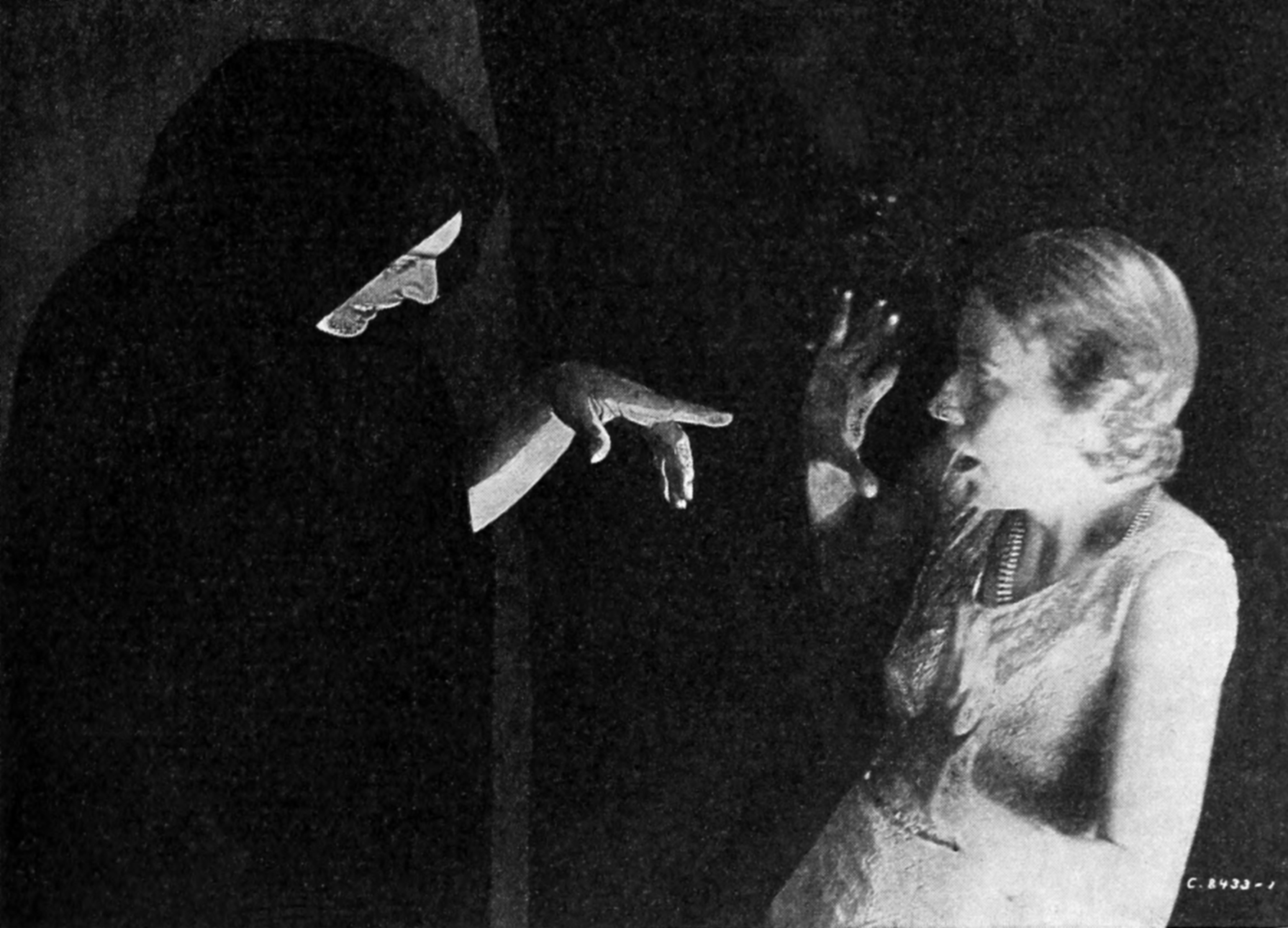
CBS promotional photo for its new program

- The pulp character known as "The Shadow" first appeared, as the mysterious narrator (initially voiced by James LaCurto) of Street & Smith's Detective Story Hour, a new program on CBS Radio.
- The Alfred Hitchcock-directed film Murder! was released.
