= June 1930 =

Month of 1930

<<	June 1930					>>
Su	Mo	Tu	We	Th	Fr	Sa
1	2	3	4	5	6	7
8	9	10	11	12	13	14
15	16	17	18	19	20	21
22	23	24	25	26	27	28
29	30

The following events occurred in June 1930:

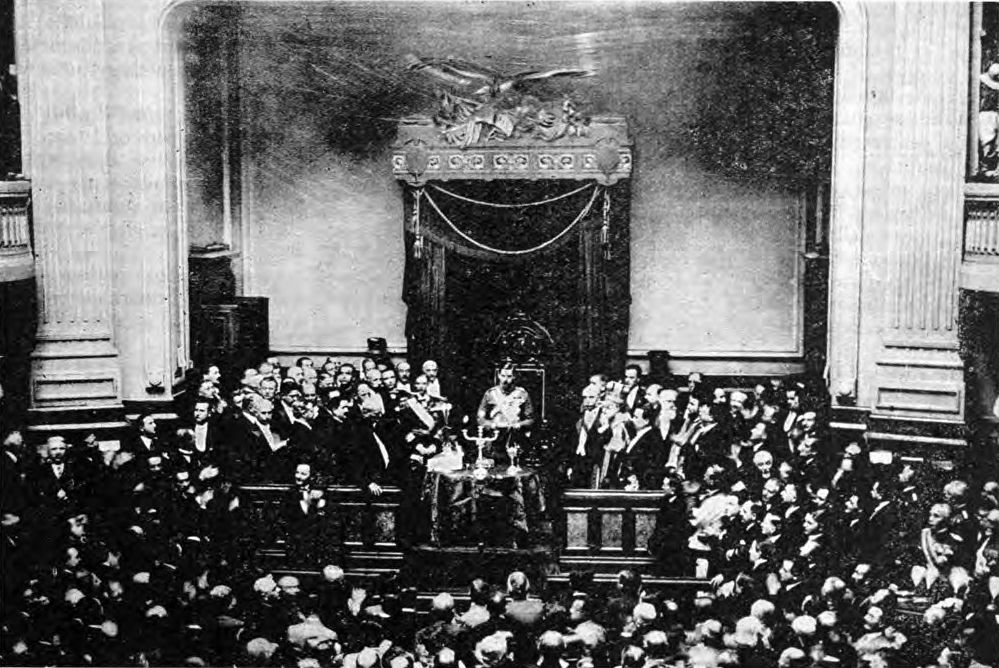
June 8, 1930: Carol II proclaimed as King of Romania after return from exile

== Sunday, June 1, 1930 ==
- Athletic Bilbao defeated Real Madrid 3–2 in the Copa del Rey Final.
- The International Federation of Film Critics was formed.
- The Deccan Queen between Mumbai and Pune was inaugurated, making it the first train service in India that was hauled by an electric locomotive.
- Born: Edward Woodward, an English actor, in Croydon (d. 2009)

== Monday, June 2, 1930 ==
- The U.S. Congress voted to override President Hoover's veto of the Spanish–American War veteran's pension bill.
- Born: Pete Conrad, American astronaut; in Philadelphia (d. 1999)
- Died: Herbert Lord, 70, director of the United States Bureau of the Budget

== Tuesday, June 3, 1930 ==
- Italian foreign minister Dino Grandi told the senate that France had spurned an offer from Italy to suspend its naval building program for one year if France would do the same.
- Born: Marion Zimmer Bradley, American fantasy and science fiction author, in Albany, New York (d. 1999)

== Wednesday, June 4, 1930 ==
- The National Bank of India and several shops were burned in Delhi in a mysterious fire.
- The Pantages Theatre in Hollywood opened.

== Thursday, June 5, 1930 ==
- Two of France's largest industrial organizations warned the United States that passage of the Smoot-Hawley bill would trigger an international tariff war.
- Died: Jules Pascin, 45, Bulgarian painter, by suicide

== Friday, June 6, 1930 ==
- Former crown prince Carol of Romania ended his exile of nearly five years and returned to Bucharest by plane.
- Jim Londos became the first officially recognized world heavyweight champion of the National Wrestling Association (NWA) when he defeated NYSAC world heavyweight champion Dick Shikat in Philadelphia.

== Saturday, June 7, 1930 ==
- Gallant Fox won the Belmont Stakes horse race to win the American Triple Crown of Thoroughbred Racing.
- The cabinet of Romanian Prime Minister Iuliu Maniu resigned in protest of Carol's return; Gheorghe Mironescu took over.

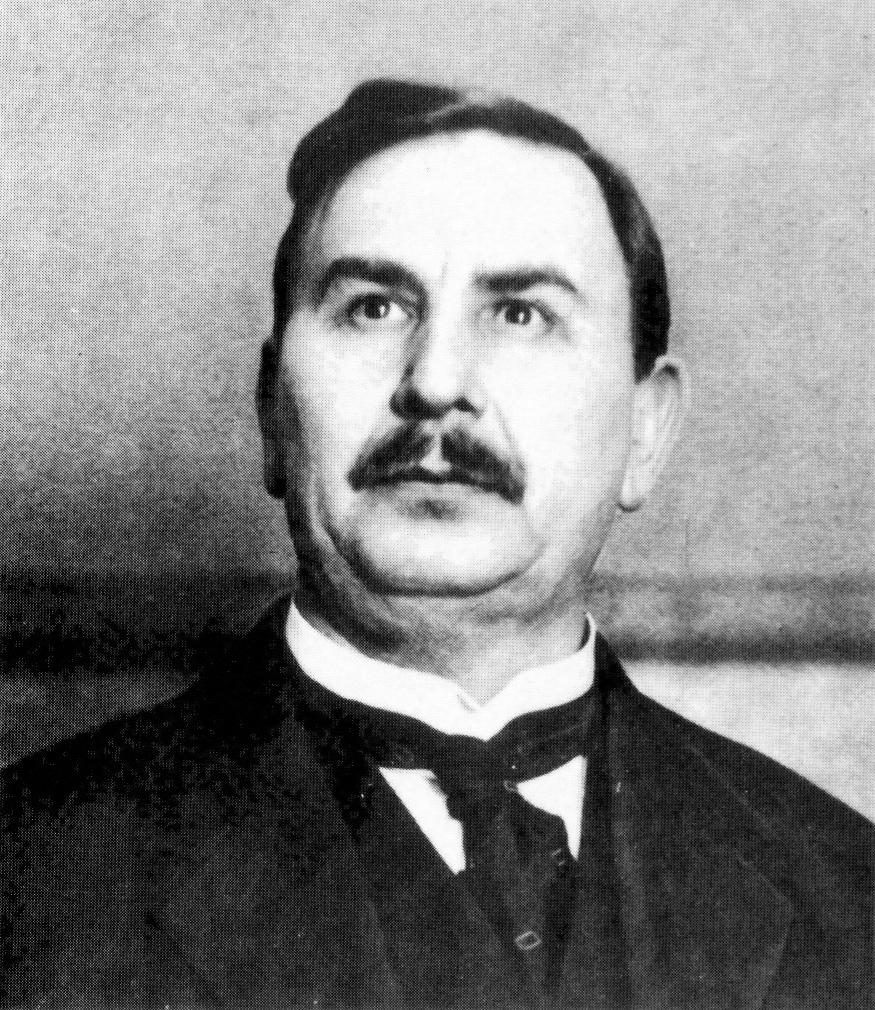
Ekman

- Carl Gustaf Ekman became the 21st Prime Minister of Sweden.

== Sunday, June 8, 1930 ==
- Carol was crowned King Carol II of Romania when parliament revoked the act of renunciation passed in January 1926. Deposed eight-year-old king Michael was returned to the position of crown prince.
- Born: Robert Aumann, German mathematician, in Frankfurt

== Monday, June 9, 1930 ==
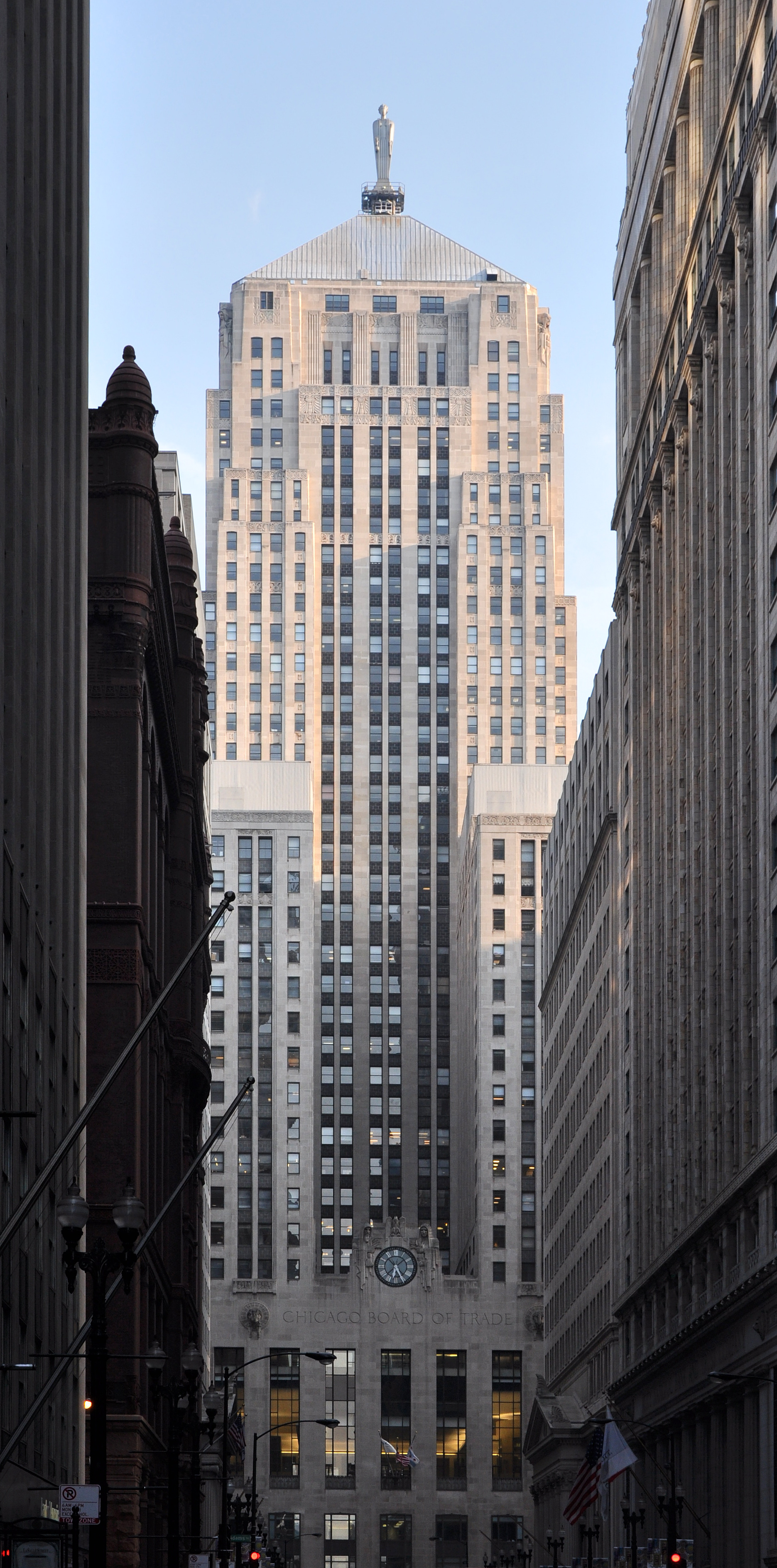
June 9, 1930: Chicago Board of Trade building, the city's tallest, opens

- Chicago Tribune reporter Jake Lingle was shot to death by mobsters at 1:25 in the afternoon at the Illinois Central station in front of many witnesses. Chicago newspapers soon offered a combined $55,000 reward for information leading to conviction of the killer or killers.
- The Chicago Board of Trade Building opened.
- Born: Monique Serf, French singer, in Paris (d. 1997)

== Tuesday, June 10, 1930 ==
- The first volume of the Simon Commission's findings were published, investigating the question of constitutional reform in India. The report pointed to the caste system, differences among cultures and large number of languages as obstacles to change.
- The Bombay Chronicle called the Simon Commission's report "almost, in every instance, a subtle libel on India and her people. All the familiar bureaucratic arguments are trotted out. The country's course is clear. The country will carry on the struggle, accepting no settlement, except through Mahatma Gandhi and the Nationalist Congress."
- Forty-seven people on the Greek tanker Pinthis were killed when the ship was rammed by a passenger ship, S.S. Fairfax, off of the coast of Scituate, Massachusetts.
- Died: Adolf von Harnack, 79, German Lutheran theologian and church historian

== Wednesday, June 11, 1930 ==
- Great Britain launched three new Rainbow-class submarines, 34 minutes apart: HMS Regent, Regulus and Rover.
- The Dow Jones Industrial Average dropped 3.19% amid rumors that a big banking house was in trouble.
- Born: Charles Rangel, African American U.S. Congressman for New York's Harlem neighborhood from 1971 to 2017; in Manhattan (d. 2025)

== Thursday, June 12, 1930 ==
- Max Schmeling won the vacant World Heavyweight Championship of boxing at Yankee Stadium when he beat Jack Sharkey by disqualification in the fourth round.
- William Beebe and Otis Barton conducted a deep sea dive in the submersible Bathysphere off the coast of Bermuda, attaining a depth of 1,426 feet.
- In Romania, Gheorghe Mironescu failed to form a government and returned the mandate to King Carol.
- Born: Jim Nabors, American comedian, television actor, and singer; in Sylacauga, Alabama (d. 2017)

== Friday, June 13, 1930 ==
- The U.S. Senate passed the Smoot-Hawley tariff bill.
- Iuliu Maniu returned as Romanian Prime Minister.

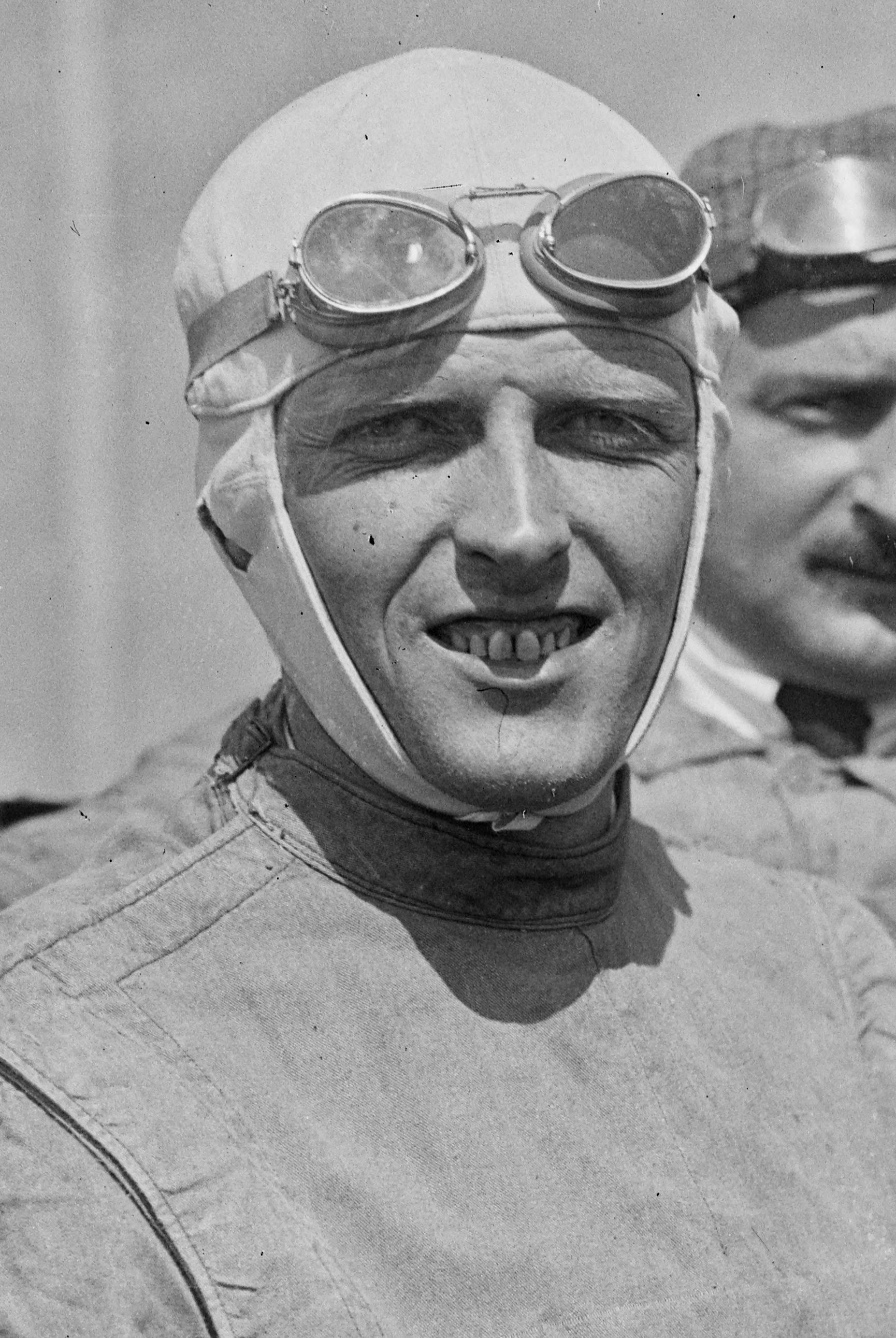
Segrave

- Died: Sir Henry Segrave, 33, American-born British pilot and racer, was killed in a boating accident

== Saturday, June 14, 1930 ==
- Church officials in Romania told King Carol II that they considered his divorce from Helen of Greece and Denmark to be void so the two could rule as king and queen. Carol had left his mistress Magda Lupescu behind in Paris when he returned to Romania to claim the throne.

== Sunday, June 15, 1930 ==
- Seymour Parker Gilbert published his final report on the Dawes Plan. The 400-page document said that Germany had paid over $2.2 billion between the implementation of the plan in 1924 and May 17, 1930, but warned that Germany would have to implement financial restraint and avoid huge deficits in order to keep making its payments in the future.
- Born: Marcel Pronovost, Canadian ice hockey player and coach, in Lac-à-la-Tortue, Quebec (d. 2015)
- Ikuo Hirayama, Japanese painter, in Setoda, Hiroshima Prefecture (d. 2009)
- Died: Louis-Lucien Klotz, 62, French journalist and politician

== Monday, June 16, 1930 ==
- The Dow Jones tumbled again to 230.05 points, its lowest level of the year to date. Anxiety over the Smoot-Hawley tariff was widely blamed for the decline of the last two weeks.

== Tuesday, June 17, 1930 ==
- President Hoover signed the Smoot–Hawley Tariff Act into law.
- Born: Brian Statham, English cricketer; in Gorton, Manchester (d. 2000)

== Wednesday, June 18, 1930 ==
- Paul Moldenhauer resigned as German finance minister due to lack of support for his policy within his own party, the German People's Party.

== Thursday, June 19, 1930 ==
- The tariff committee of the French government adopted a unanimous resolution condemning the Smoot-Hawley Tariff. The resolution also called on the government to issue an ultimatum to President Hoover demanding that duties be relaxed under the act's flexible provisions or face reprisal.
- Born: Gena Rowlands, American film actress; in Madison, Wisconsin (d. 2024)

== Friday, June 20, 1930 ==
- U.S. Secretary of the Treasury Andrew W. Mellon issued a statement defending the Smoot-Hawley Tariff, saying it made a "definite contribution to business stability" and that industries should be able to adjust to the new law without difficulty.
- Bobby Jones won his third Open Championship golf title.
- German president Paul von Hindenburg appointed Chancellor Heinrich Brüning as acting finance minister following Paul Moldenhauer's resignation.

== Saturday, June 21, 1930 ==
- Mexican Army Colonel Roberto Fierro flew non-stop from New York to Mexico City in 16 hours 35 minutes. Emilio Carranza had fatally crashed in 1928 attempting the same flight.

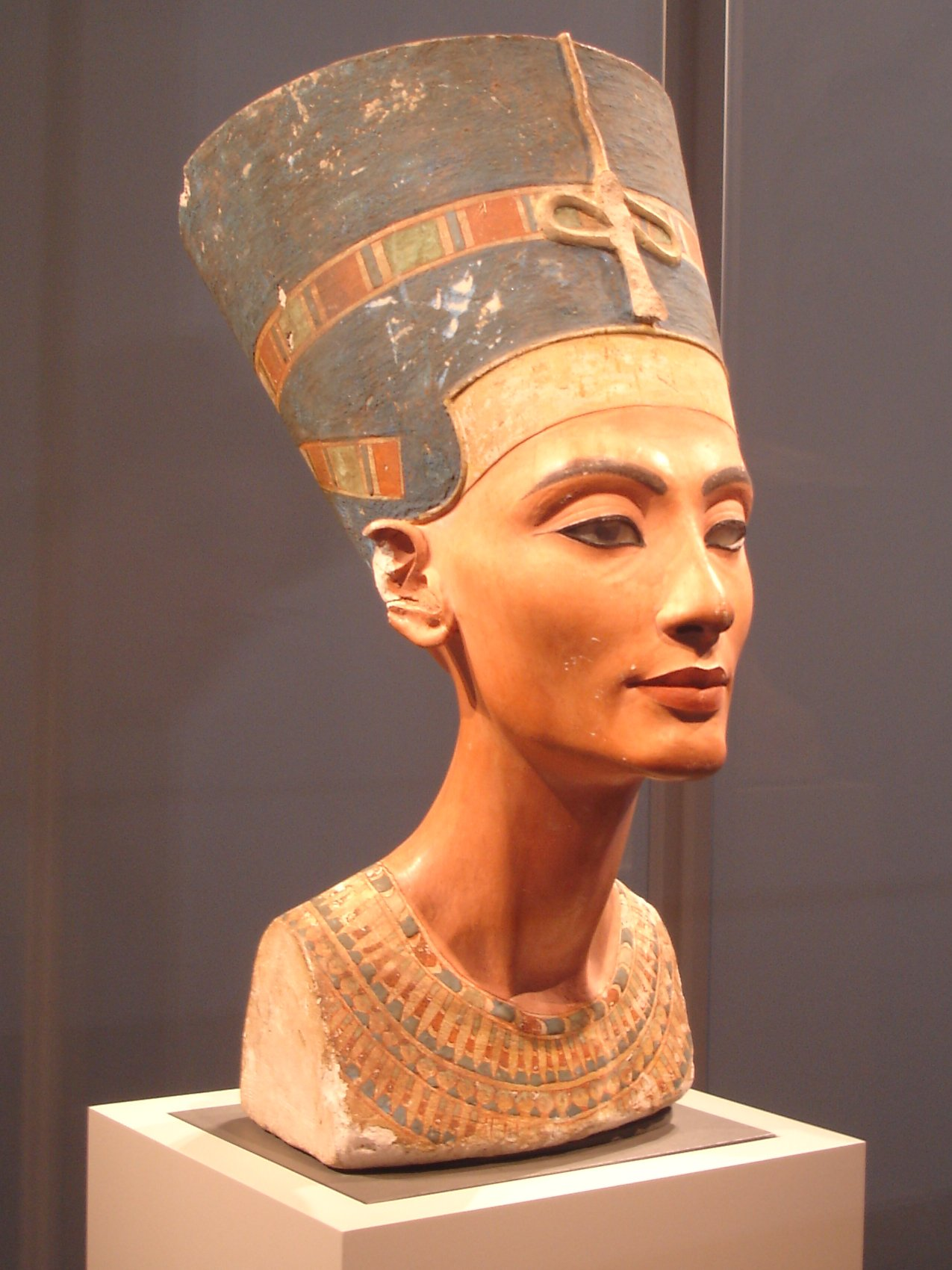
Nefertiti

- The Prussian Ministry of Culture decided to keep the Nefertiti Bust in the Berlin Museum. The Egyptian government had offered two other statues as replacements.
- Born: Mike McCormack, American football player and coach; in Chicago (d. 2013)

== Sunday, June 22, 1930 ==
- Charles and Anne Lindbergh became parents of a baby boy, Charles Jr.
- Nazis won 14.4% of the vote in state Landtag elections in Saxony, triple their share of the vote from the elections held there in May 1929.
- The British team of Woolf Barnato and Glen Kidston won the Le Mans endurance race.
- Born: Yury Artyukhin, Soviet Russian cosmonaut on Soyuz 14; in Pershutino, Moscow Oblast (d. 1998)

== Monday, June 23, 1930 ==
- In Seville in Spain, at least 150 people were injured in clashes between police and workers who staged a general strike.
- The Federal Power Commission was formed in the United States.

== Tuesday, June 24, 1930 ==
- The second volume of the Simon Commission report was published. The report said it was "prepared to recommend a considerable advance towards self-government", but also desired "to secure that experience is not bought too dearly....There must be provided, as far as may be, safeguards to ensure the maintenance of essential services." The report also recommended the separation of India and Burma due to racial, geographical and financial differences.
- Forty Burmese prisoners and five guards were killed in a prison riot in Rangoon.

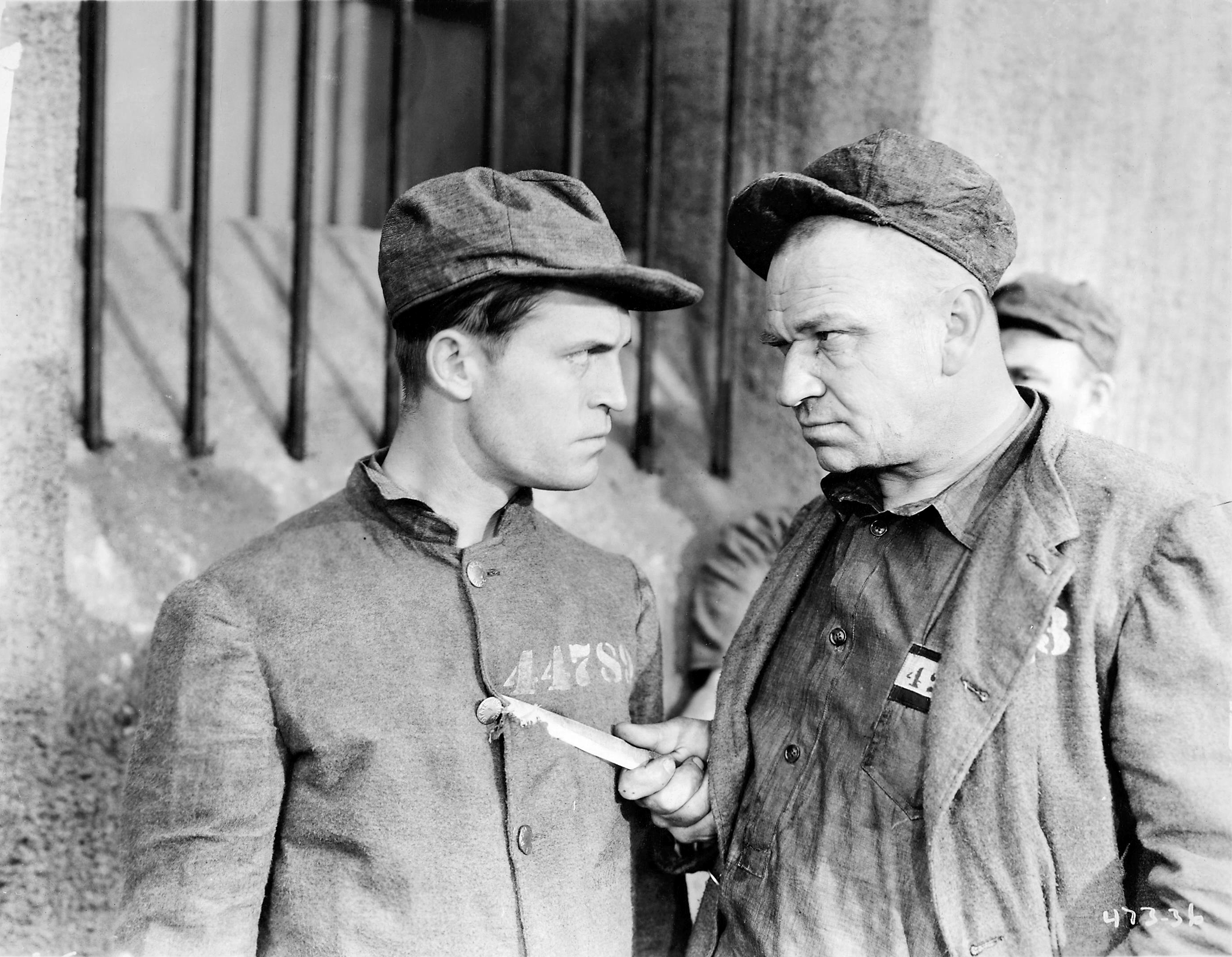
Morris and Beery in The Big House

- The prison film The Big House, starring Chester Morris and Wallace Beery, premiered at the Astor Theatre in New York City.
- Born:
  - Claude Chabrol, French film director, in Sardent (d. 2010)
  - Dave Creighton, Canadian ice hockey player; in Port Arthur, Ontario (d. 2017)
  - William Bernard Ziff, Jr., U.S. publishing executive, in Pawling, New York (d. 2006)

== Wednesday, June 25, 1930 ==
- St Paul's Cathedral held a service to celebrate the completion of its lengthy restoration. King George V, the British cabinet and 160 bishops attended.
- Maxie Rosenbloom became the undisputed world light heavyweight champion with a controversial victory over Jimmy Slattery. The referee awarded his decision to Slattery after almost being knocked out by a wild swing from Rosenbloom, but he was overruled by two judges.
- A commission appointed to investigate Muslim and Jewish claims to the Wailing Wall had its first public sitting in Jerusalem.
- Born: László Antal, Hungarian linguist; in Szob (d. 1993)

== Thursday, June 26, 1930 ==
- The 16th Congress of the All-Union Communist Party opened in Moscow.
- Bolivian rebels attacked the capital city of La Paz.
- Hermann Dietrich became German finance minister.
- Thirty people were killed in the explosion of the drill boat John B. King in Brockville, Ontario, after dynamite on the ship was struck by lightning.

== Friday, June 27, 1930 ==
- La Paz was captured by Bolivian rebels led by Carlos Blanco Galindo.
- Lotus Isle Amusement Park opened in Portland, Oregon.
- Born: Ross Perot, U.S. businessman and presidential candidate; in Texarkana, Texas (d. 2019)

== Saturday, June 28, 1930 ==
- Carlos Blanco Galindo became President of Bolivia.
- The Terminal Tower in Cleveland opened.
- Born: Itamar Franco, President of Brazil from 1992 to 1994; in São Paulo (d. 2011)

== Sunday, June 29, 1930 ==
- Pope Pius XI canonized the Canadian Martyrs as saints.
- Born: Robert Evans, U.S. film producer and studio executive; in New York City (d. 2019)

== Monday, June 30, 1930 ==
- The occupation of the Rhineland ended after more than 11 years with the departure of the last Allied troops.
- Jawaharlal Nehru was arrested by the Indian government again during a raid on Indian National Congress headquarters.
- Born:
  - Thomas Sowell, American economist and social theorist (Hoover Institute), in Gastonia, North Carolina
  - Joyce Wieland, artist and experimental filmmaker, in Toronto, Canada (d. 1998)
