= September 1930 =

Month of 1930

<<	September 1930					>>
Su	Mo	Tu	We	Th	Fr	Sa
	1	2	3	4	5	6
7	8	9	10	11	12	13
14	15	16	17	18	19	20
21	22	23	24	25	26	27
28	29	30

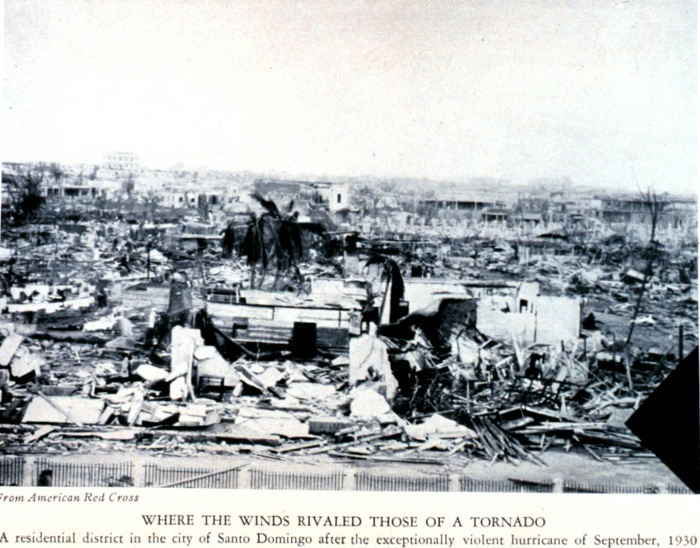
September 3, 1930: Over 8,000 people killed when hurricane strikes the Dominican Republic

The following events occurred in September 1930:

== Monday, September 1, 1930 ==
- Thousands of leftists and labourers in Budapest fought with police while demonstrating for "bread and work".
- Japanese Minister of Finance Junnosuke Inoue urged an international round table conference to address the worldwide economic depression.
- Died: Peeter Põld, 51, Estonian pedagogic scientist and politician

== Tuesday, September 2, 1930 ==
- French aviators Dieudonné Costes and Maurice Bellonte completed the first nonstop flight from Paris to New York. The flight took 37 hours 18 minutes and 30 seconds.

== Wednesday, September 3, 1930 ==
- A hurricane struck the Dominican Republic, killing over 8,000 people and doing an estimated $15 million in damage.
- Born: Cherry Wilder, science fiction and fantasy author, in Auckland, New Zealand (d. 2002)

== Thursday, September 4, 1930 ==
- The Cambridge Theatre opened in London.
- Born: Jerry Ragovoy, songwriter and record producer, in Philadelphia (d. 2011)

== Friday, September 5, 1930 ==
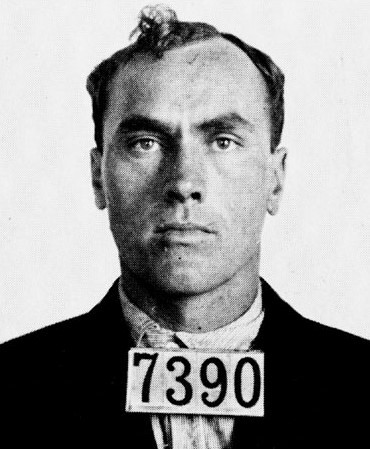
Panzram

- Hipólito Yrigoyen resigned as President of Argentina following a week of violent antigovernment demonstrations. Vice President Enrique Martínez was named acting president.
- Serial killer Carl Panzram was hanged in Kansas, the first execution in that state since 1888.

== Saturday, September 6, 1930 ==
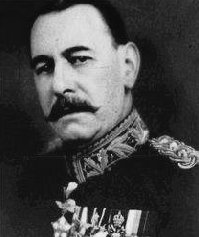
Uriburu

- José Félix Uriburu became President of Argentina when a military junta seized the government.
- The editor of the German newspaper Morgenpost was fined and sentenced to three months in prison for libeling ex-kaiser Wilhelm II. The paper had published a statement claiming that the kaiser enriched himself before the war by investing his private fortune in armament firms which gained monopolies through his influence.
- In Trieste, Italy, four Yugoslavs were executed at dawn by firing squad for plotting to assassinate Benito Mussolini, less than a day after being found guilty.

== Sunday, September 7, 1930 ==
- Students rioted in Ljubljana during demonstrations protesting the execution of four Yugoslavs the previous day. News of the executions had been censored by the Yugoslavian government to prevent anti-Italian violence but word still spread through private sources.
- Born:
  - King Baudouin I, reigning monarch of Belgium from 1951 until his death; at Stuyvenberg Castle, Laeken (d. 1993)
  - Sonny Rollins, U.S. jazz saxophonist, in New York City

== Monday, September 8, 1930 ==
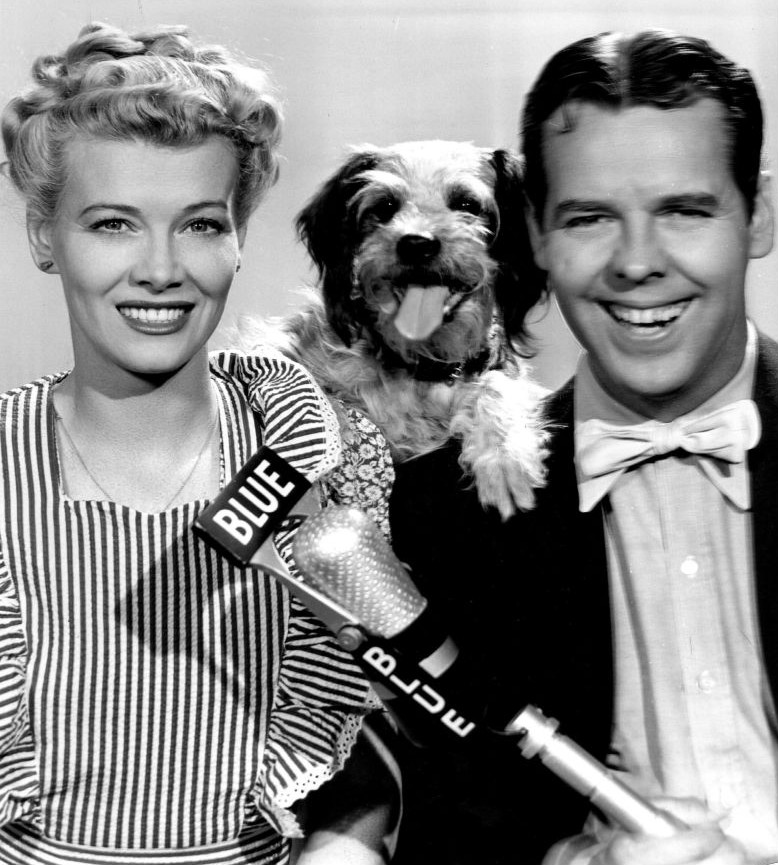
Penny Singleton and Arthur Lake portraying Blondie and Dagwood Bumstead in multiple films based on the comic strip

- The Chic Young comic strip Blondie made its first appearance.

== Tuesday, September 9, 1930 ==
- The Indian government issued a report on its negotiations with leaders of the civil disobedience movement, describing their demands as "unreasonable and impracticable".
- Born: Frank Lucas, drug lord, in La Grange, North Carolina (d. 2019)
- Died: Joseph Pinzolo, 42 or 43, boss of the Lucchese crime family (murdered)

== Wednesday, September 10, 1930 ==
- A letter from New York Governor Franklin D. Roosevelt to Senator Robert F. Wagner was publicized in which Roosevelt came out in favor of repealing the Eighteenth Amendment, writing that it had led to corruption and hypocrisy and had flooded the country with untaxed and illicit liquor.
- Luke Appling made his major league baseball debut with the Chicago White Sox, going 1-for-4 during a 6–2 loss to the Boston Red Sox.
- Died: Aubrey Faulkner, 48, South African cricketer

== Thursday, September 11, 1930 ==
- Five people were killed in a simultaneous earthquake and eruption of the volcanic island of Stromboli in Italy.
- Born:
  - Cathryn Damon, American actress; in Seattle (d. 1987)
  - Renzo Montagnani, Italian actor and dubber; in Alessandria (d. 1997)

== Friday, September 12, 1930 ==
- The Eastern Columbia Building opened in downtown Los Angeles.

== Saturday, September 13, 1930 ==
- One person was killed and 8 wounded during fighting in Berlin between communists and Nazis on the eve of Reichstag elections.
- Born:
  - Bola Ige, Nigerian cabinet minister and later Minister of Justice; in Zaria (assassinated 2001)
  - Mary Baumgartner, American baseball player for the AAGPBL; in Fort Wayne, Indiana (d. 2018)

== Sunday, September 14, 1930 ==
- Elections were held for the 577 seats of Germany's Reichstag. The Social Democrats remained the largest party in the Reichstag, but the Nazi Party surged from 12 seats to 107, becoming the country's second largest party. Communists also gained, increasing their seat count from 54 to 77.

== Monday, September 15, 1930 ==
- Britain announced the closure of 90 railway stations to passenger traffic due to economic depression and the rise of motor bus travel.
- Died: Milton Sills, 48, American actor, from a heart attack

== Tuesday, September 16, 1930 ==
- The Berlin city council met for the first time since summer recess, but broke up in tumult after the Communists and Nazis introduced a motion demanding that the council dissolve. The motion was defeated.
- Born: Anne Francis, actress, in Ossining, New York (d. 2011)

== Wednesday, September 17, 1930 ==
- The Chinese and British governments reached an agreement by which the British would finish construction of the Canton to Hankou railway begun in 1904 by Americans but never completed. Britain would use its share of the Boxer Indemnity to pay for construction.
- Born: Thomas P. Stafford, American astronaut on Apollo 10 and two Gemini program missions; in Weatherford, Oklahoma (d. 2024)

== Thursday, September 18, 1930 ==
- The Philadelphia Athletics clinched their second straight American League pennant with a 14–10 victory over the Chicago White Sox.
- The New York Yacht Club retained the America's Cup, defeating the Royal Ulster Yacht Club four races to none.
- Albert Einstein told the Jewish Telegraphic Agency that there was "no reason for despair" over the Nazi Party's strong showing in Sunday's elections, because it was "only a symptom, not necessarily of anti-Jewish hatred but of momentary resentment caused by economic misery and unemployment within the ranks of misguided German youth. I hope that the momentary fever and wave will rapidly fall."

== Friday, September 19, 1930 ==
- The Fox Wilshire Theater, known today as the Saban Theatre, opened in Beverly Hills, California.
- Born: Seth Riggs, American vocal coach, in Rockville, Maryland

== Saturday, September 20, 1930 ==
- Paul von Hindenburg appointed Kurt von Hammerstein-Equord as the new Commander-in-Chief of the Reichswehr.
- Pomp and Circumstance March No. 5 in C by Sir Edward Elgar was first performed in London.
- Born: Kenneth Mopeli, Chief Minister of QwaQwa bantustan, in Namahadi (d. 2014)
- Died: Gombojab Tsybikov, 57, Russian explorer

== Sunday, September 21, 1930 ==
- Eleven people drowned at sea as a gale lashed the French Atlantic seaboard.
- Born: Dawn Addams, English actress, in Felixstowe, Suffolk (d. 1985)
- Died: John Thompson Dorrance, 56, American chemist

== Monday, September 22, 1930 ==
- Benito Mussolini refuted rumors that he was suffering from ill health by riding around on a horse for half an hour in front of journalists.
- George Sisler of the Boston Braves played in the final game of his major league career, going 0-for-1 in a pinch hitting appearance in the eighth inning against the Chicago Cubs. Sisler finished his career with a lofty .340 batting average.
- Died: Henry Phipps, Jr., 90, American steel industrialist and philanthropist

== Tuesday, September 23, 1930 ==
- Three Reichswehr artillery officers went on trial before the Leipzig Supreme Court in Germany, charged with high treason for conspiring with the Nazis to overthrow the government.
- Born:
  - Ray Charles, African-American musician; in Albany, Georgia (d. 2004)
  - Colin Blakely, Northern Irish actor; in Bangor, County Down, Northern Ireland (d. 1987)

== Wednesday, September 24, 1930 ==
- The Soviet Union had 48 officials shot as "unreconcilable enemies of the Soviet government and active counter-revolutionists." They were convicted of conspiring to create a food panic in the country to prepare the ground for the overthrow of the government.
- The steamship Borinquen was launched
- The play Once in a Lifetime, by Moss Hart and George S. Kaufman, premiered at the Music Box Theatre on Broadway.
- Born: Angelo Muscat, actor, in Malta (d. 1977)
- Died: William A. MacCorkle, 73, 9th Governor of West Virginia

== Thursday, September 25, 1930 ==
- Adolf Hitler took the stand in the Leipzig Supreme Court trial of three officers accused of high treason. He testified that the Nazis would only take power through constitutional means, explaining, "Another two or three elections and the National Socialist movement will have the majority in the Reichstag, and then we will make the national revolution." When pressed under further questioning Hitler explained that he was committed to legality but would eliminate or replace the Weimar Constitution when he came to power, and would set up state tribunals that would be "empowered to pass sentences by law on those responsible for the misfortunes of our nation. Possibly, then, quite a few heads will roll legally."
- Born: Shel Silverstein, author, poet and cartoonist, in Chicago (d. 1999)

== Friday, September 26, 1930 ==
- Fifteen people were shot dead near Panvel in British India in a clash between police and pro-independence demonstrators.
- The St. Louis Cardinals clinched the National League pennant with a 10–5 win over the Pittsburgh Pirates.
- Born:
  - Philip Bosco, American stage, film and television actor; in Jersey City, New Jersey (d. 2018)
  - Fritz Wunderlich, German lyric tenor, in Kusel, Palatinate (d. 1966)

== Saturday, September 27, 1930 ==
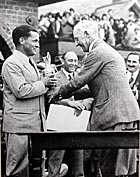
Jones at the 1930 British Open

- Bobby Jones completed the first Grand Slam in golf history by winning the U.S. Amateur Championship, after having won the Amateur Championship in Scotland, the Open in England, and the U.S. Open. The Masters Tournament would not begin until 1934.
- Born: Dick Hall, baseball player, in St. Louis, Missouri (d. 2023)

== Sunday, September 28, 1930 ==
- Fifty thousand German Communists staged a massive anti-Hitler protest in Berlin.

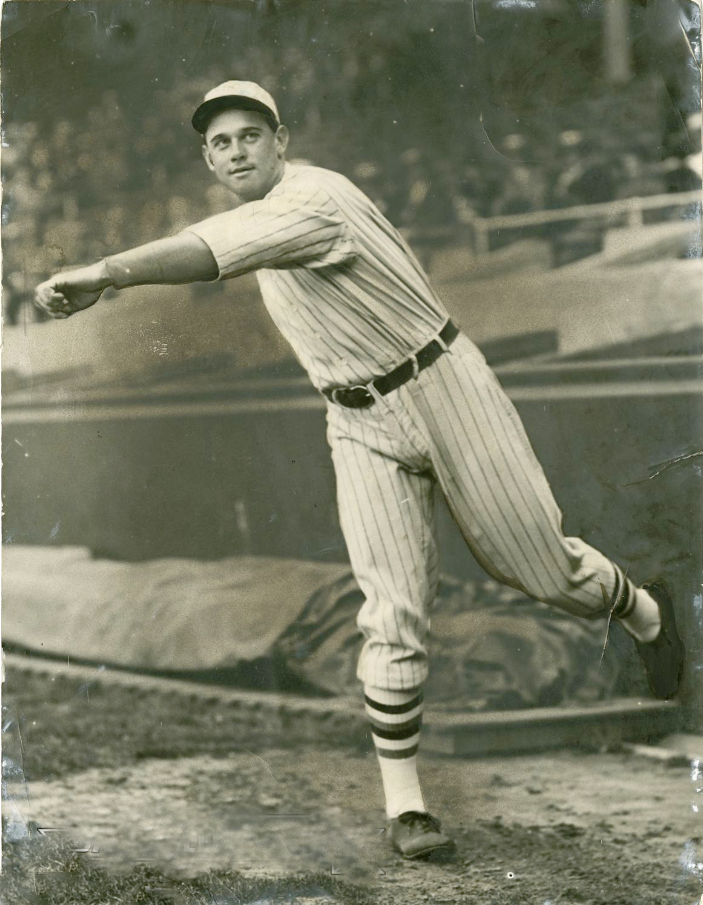
Bill Terry

- Bill Terry of the New York Giants went 0-for-3 during a 7–6 win over the Philadelphia Phillies to finish the season with a .401 batting average (based on 254 hits in 633 times at bat, or getting a hit more than 40% of the time). Terry remains the last National League player to bat .400.
- Hack Wilson of the Chicago Cubs batted in two runs during a 13–11 victory over the Cincinnati Reds, giving him a total of 191 RBIs for the year – a single-season major league record that still stands. He also finished the season with 56 home runs, a National League record that stood until 1998.
- The Rube Goldberg-written film Soup to Nuts, marking the film debut of the performers who would go on to become The Three Stooges, was released.
- Born: Johnny "Country" Mathis, country singer and songwriter, in Maud, Texas (d. 2011)

== Monday, September 29, 1930 ==
- National Guardsmen in Huntsville, Alabama, attacked a crowd around the Madison County jail with tear gas bombs. The mob was trying to storm the jail where an African-American man was being held in connection with the murder of a businessman.
- George Bernard Shaw declined the offer of a peerage.
- Born: Billy Strange, musician and actor, in Long Beach, California (d. 2012)

== Tuesday, September 30, 1930 ==
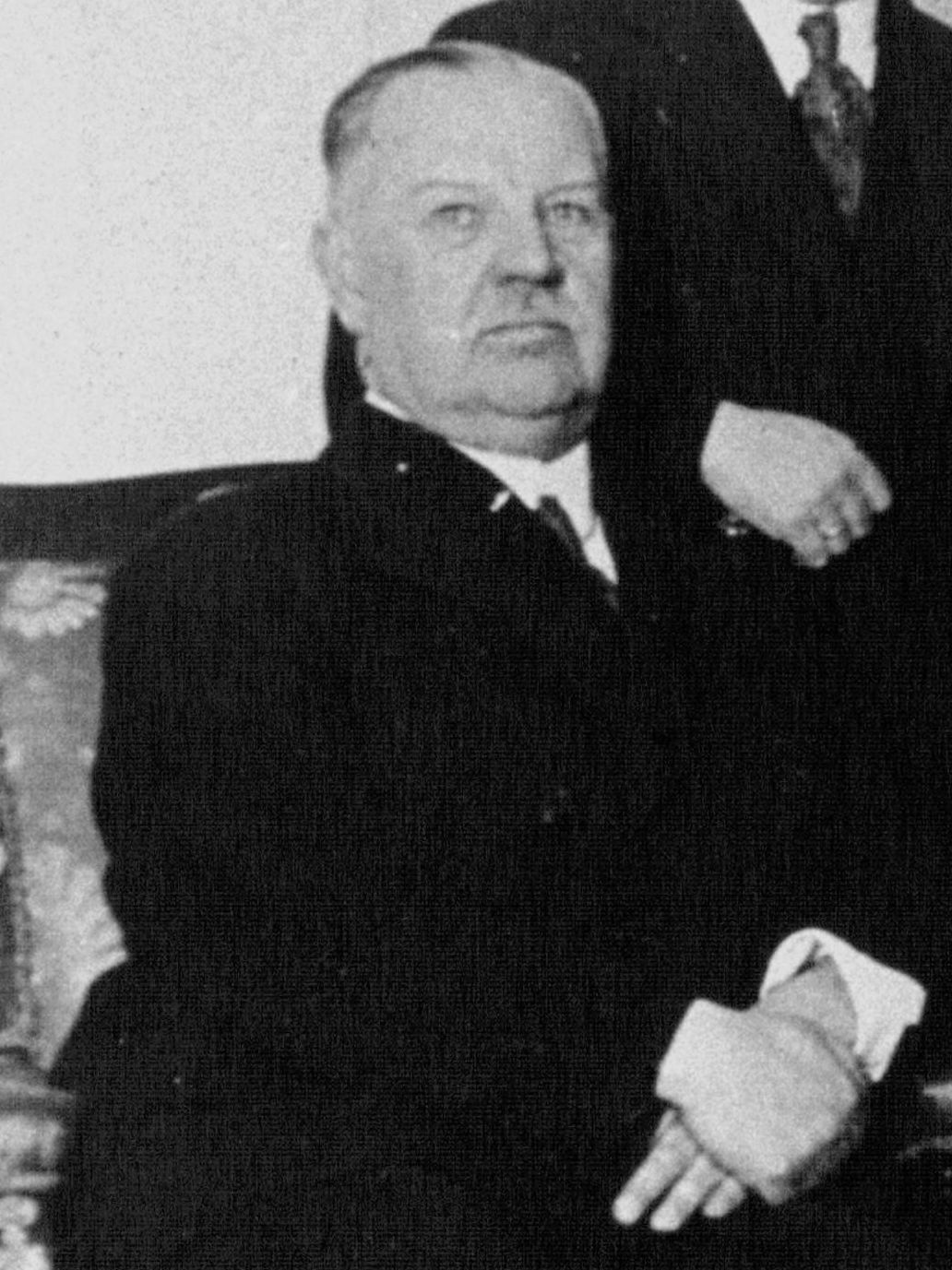
Chancellor Vaugoin

- Carl Vaugoin became Chancellor of Austria.
- Students at the University of Havana held a demonstration against president Gerardo Machado. Police blocked the streets and during the ensuing clashes, a student leader by the name of Rafael Trejo was killed. Trejo was later held up to be a martyr and a hero in Cuban history.
- "Public enemy" Jake Guzik was arrested by federal operatives in Chicago on charges of tax fraud. He was released after posting a $50,000 cash bond.
- The "All-Talking All Color" musical comedy film Whoopee! starring Eddie Cantor was released.
- Died: Albert W. Grant, 74, American admiral
