= August 1930 =

Month of 1930

<<	August 1930					>>
Su	Mo	Tu	We	Th	Fr	Sa
					1	2
3	4	5	6	7	8	9
10	11	12	13	14	15	16
17	18	19	20	21	22	23
24	25	26	27	28	29	30
31

The following events occurred in August 1930:

== Friday, August 1, 1930 ==
- The British airship R100 completed an east–west crossing of the Atlantic Ocean when it was secured at St. Hubert Airport in Montreal, 78 hours and 51 minutes after its departure from Cardington, UK – a new speed record.
- Born: Pierre Bourdieu, sociologist, in Denguin, France (d. 2002)
- Died: Jack Zuta, 42, Chicago underworld figure (shot)

== Saturday, August 2, 1930 ==
- Italy authorized Vatican City to issue currency of up to 1 million lire per year.

== Sunday, August 3, 1930 ==
- Italy and the Soviet Union signed a commercial treaty.

== Monday, August 4, 1930 ==
- The first supermarket in the United States, "King Kullen" (recognized by the Smithsonian Institution based on being “the first to fulfill all five criteria that define the modern supermarket: separate departments; self-service; discount pricing; chain marketing; and volume dealing," was founded by Michael J. Cullen with a location at the corner of 171st Street and Jamaica Avenue in the Jamaica neighborhood of Queens borough in New York City.
- Born: Grand Ayatollah Ali al-Sistani, one of the 12 Marja' of Iranian Shia Islam.
- Died: Siegfried Wagner, 61, German composer and conductor, son of Richard Wagner

== Tuesday, August 5, 1930 ==
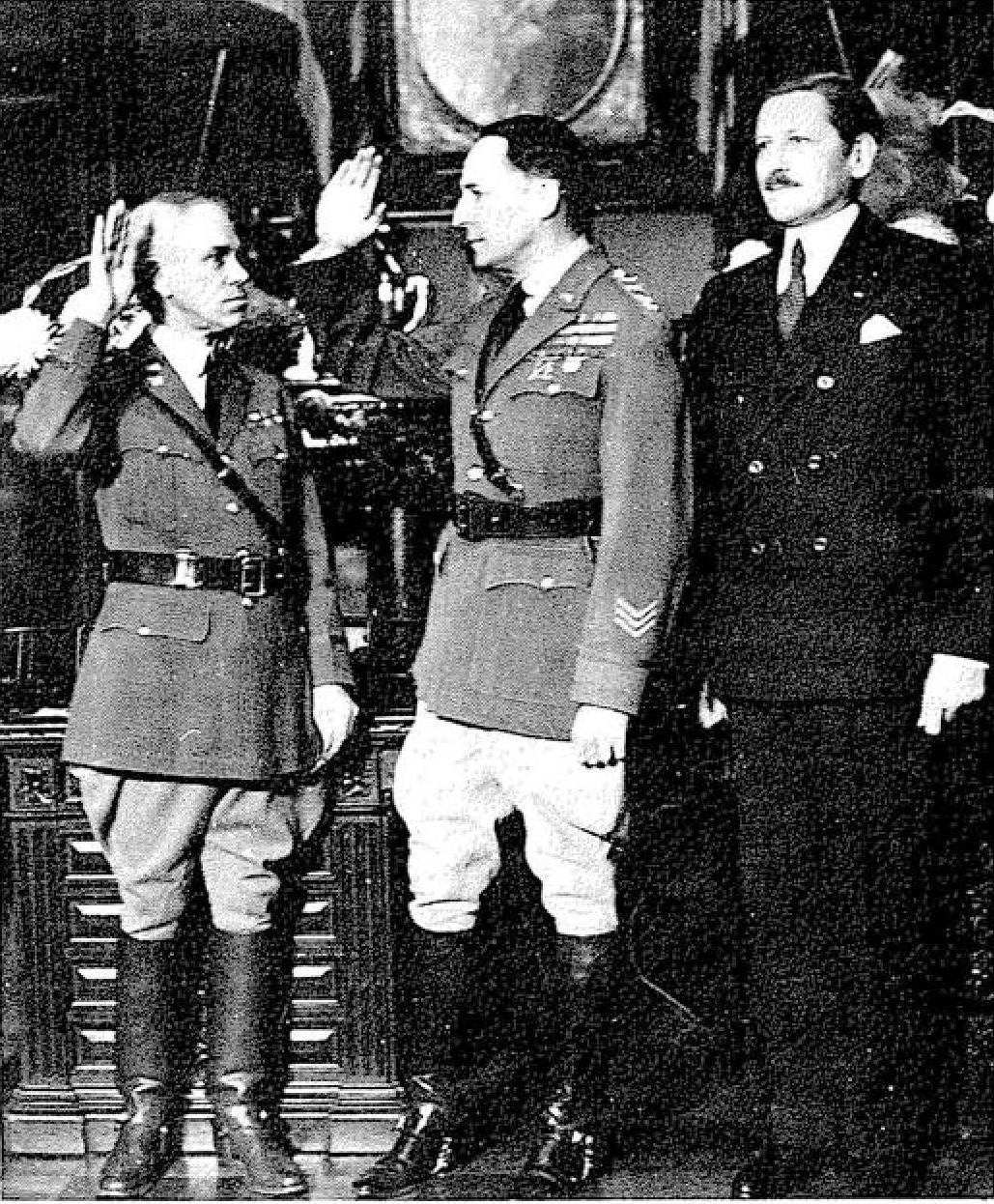
General MacArthur being sworn in as Army Chief of Staff

- U.S. President Herbert Hoover held a press conference announcing the appointment of Douglas MacArthur as Chief of Staff of the United States Army.
- Born: Neil Armstrong, American astronaut and the first man to set foot on the Moon, in Wapakoneta, Ohio (d. 2012)

== Wednesday, August 6, 1930 ==
- New York City Judge Joseph Crater disappeared in Manhattan and became the subject of one of the biggest missing persons cases in American history. Under investigation for corruption, Judge Crater was last seen in public exiting a restaurant, Billy Haas's Chophouse, at 332 West 45th Street in New York City after having gone through his office files and cashing two checks for $5,150 (equivalent to $80,000 in 2021).
- Unemployment in Britain topped 2 million.
- Britain signed a commerce treaty with Romania.
- Born: Abbey Lincoln, singer, in Chicago (d. 2010)

== Thursday, August 7, 1930 ==
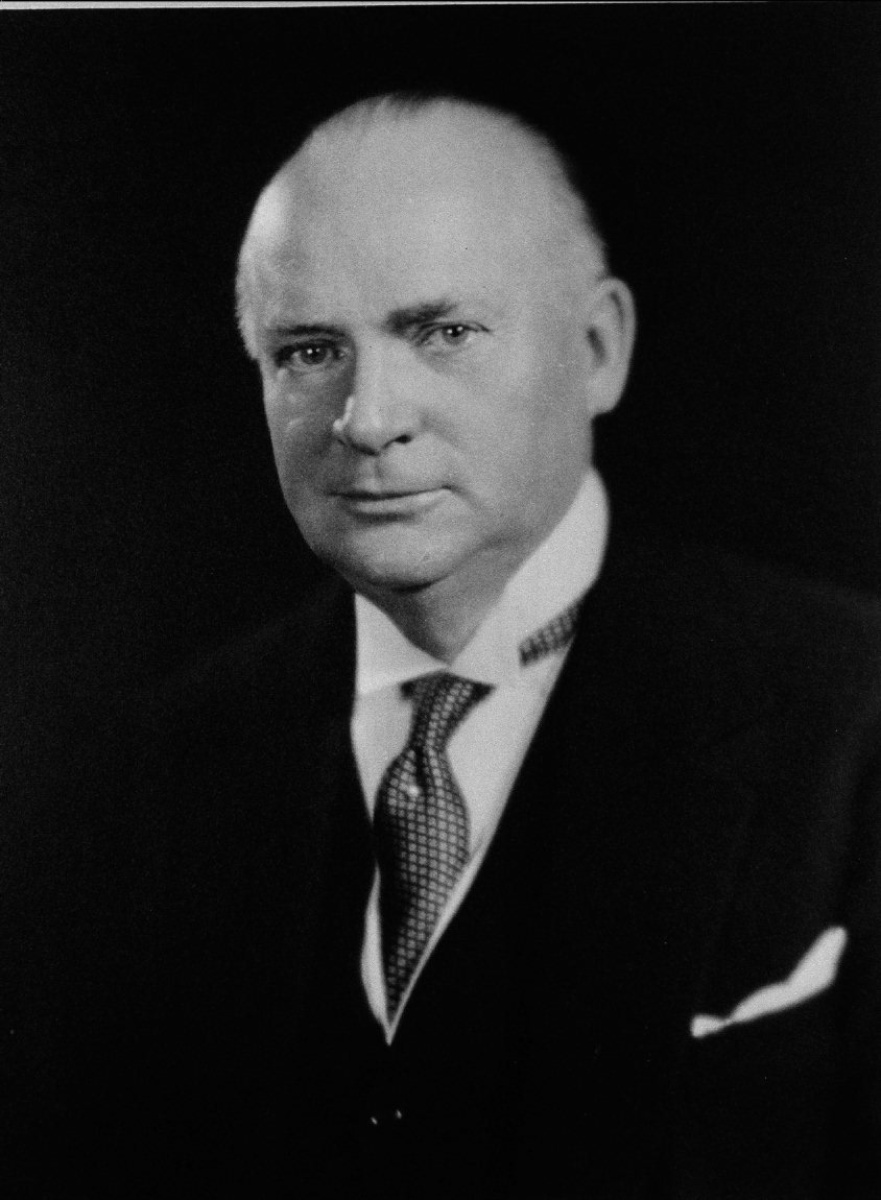
Prime Minister Bennett

- R. B. Bennett took office as the new Prime Minister of Canada.
- Nadir of American race relations: Two African-American men accused of rape and murder, Thomas Shipp and Abram Smith, were taken from a jail in Marion, Indiana, beaten by a mob and lynched. An iconic photograph was taken of the mob milling about below the two hanged men.

== Friday, August 8, 1930 ==
- Seven Reichstag members resigned from the German National People's Party because of disapproval with the increasingly right-wing direction of the party under Alfred Hugenberg.
- The Bratvaag Expedition reached Victoria Island, and encounters a sealing ship headed for Norway.

== Saturday, August 9, 1930 ==
- The cartoon character Betty Boop made her first appearance in the Fleischer Studios short film Dizzy Dishes.
- The Polish Army Stadium opened in Warsaw.
- King Carol II of Romania announced that his upcoming coronation would take place without his estranged wife Helen. Carol had suggested a compromise in which Helen could be crowned queen without a reconciliation, but Prime Minister Iuliu Maniu maintained that such a solution would not be acceptable to foreign royal guests.
- Cricketer Jack Hobbs scored his 54,921st run, beating W. G. Grace's record aggregate of 54,896.
- Born: Jacques Parizeau, Canadian politician, leader of the sovereignty advocacy Parti Québécois, and Premier of Quebec province, 1994 to 1996; in Montreal, Quebec, Canada (d. 2015)

== Sunday, August 10, 1930 ==
- A Scandinvian anti-fascist conference was held in Stockholm. 154 delegates, mainly communist and youth organizations, formed a committee to coordinate efforts to fight the spread of right-wing movements in northern Europe.
- The Hankow garrison commander in China beheaded 16 communists in the street to discourage any further unrest.
- Born: Jorma Panula, Finnish conductor and composer, in Kauhajoki

== Monday, August 11, 1930 ==
- Germany marked Republic Day, the eleventh anniversary of the creation of the Weimar Republic. During celebrations at the Reichstag, Interior Minister Joseph Wirth made a nationally broadcast radio address saying that republican Germany "may boast of being the freest country in the world."

== Tuesday, August 12, 1930 ==
- President Hoover said he was abandoning plans for a two-week vacation to Rocky Mountain National Park and would stay in the Washington area to direct drought relief work.
- Actor Jack Pickford married for a third time, to actress Mary Mulhern, in a small ceremony near Del Monte, California.
- Born: George Soros, Hungarian-born American businessman and philanthropist, in Budapest

== Wednesday, August 13, 1930 ==
- Frank Hawks set a new transcontinental west-to-east record of 12 hours, 25 minutes and 3 seconds, beating Charles Lindbergh's record set in April by over 3 hours.
- A meteoric air burst over Brazil's Curuçá River valley was witnessed by thousands of people.
- Born:
  - Don Ho (Donald Tai Loy Ho), popular Hawaiian-American ukulele musician; in Honolulu (d. 2007)
  - Wilmer Mizell, U.S. Congressman and former major league baseball pitcher; in Vinegar Bend, Alabama (d. 1999)

== Thursday, August 14, 1930 ==
- President Hoover met at the White House with the Governors of 13 U.S. states to discuss a relief program for Americans affected by a serious drought.
- The Church of England approved birth control, and made the announcement in an Encyclical Letter from the Archbishop of Canterbury. The Letter called for strict control over the sale and advertising of contraceptives, however.
- Born: Earl Weaver, American baseball manager, in St. Louis (d. 2013)
- Died: Florian Cajori, 71, Swiss-American historian

== Friday, August 15, 1930 ==
- Canada announced it was halting immigration from continental Europe with the exception of "experienced farmers of a suitable type" due to the country's unemployment problem.
- The British ocean liner RMS Tahiti lost its starboard propeller and sprang a leak about 400 miles southwest of Rarotonga, Cook Islands. The crippled ship began to slowly sink as it drifted in the Pacific Ocean while rescue efforts began.
- American Mafia boss Giuseppe Morello was killed in New York City, in one of the most high profile killings of the Castellammarese War.
- Born: Selma James, feminist writer, in Brooklyn

== Saturday, August 16, 1930 ==
- The first British Empire Games, known today as the Commonwealth Games, opened in Canada in Hamilton, Ontario, with 11 nations sending 400 athletes.
- The German film Dreyfus, starring Fritz Kortner in the title role of a dramatization of the Dreyfus affair, premiered in Berlin.
- Born: Robert Culp, U.S. film and TV actor, in Oakland, California (d. 2010)

== Sunday, August 17, 1930 ==
- The Matson liner Ventura reached the disabled Tahiti and took aboard all 175 of its passengers.
- Born: Ted Hughes, poet and children's writer, in Mytholmroyd, England (d. 1998)

== Monday, August 18, 1930 ==
- The remaining 142 officers and crew of the British ocean liner Tahiti were rescued, three days after the ship sent its distress call, and only after all the passengers had been saved first. The vessel sank soon after the last crewmember had been safely evacuated.
- The Noël Coward play Private Lives opened at the King's Theatre, Edinburgh.
- Born: Rafael Pineda Ponce, Honduran politician and presiding officer of the National Congress from 1998 to 2002; in San Miguelito, Intibucá (d. 2014)
- Died: Van Lear Black, 54, American publisher and civil aviation pioneer, was lost at sea. Black fell overboard and into the Atlantic Ocean after losing his balance while sitting on the rail of his yacht, the Sabalo, off the coast of New Jersey

== Tuesday, August 19, 1930 ==
- The 28,000-ton arches of the Sydney Harbour Bridge were completed.
- Born: Frank McCourt, 78, Irish-American teacher and writer, in Brooklyn, New York (d. 2009)

== Wednesday, August 20, 1930 ==
- Former U.S. Ambassador to Germany James W. Gerard named 59 people as the "men who rule the United States." Instead of elected officials, the list was made up of industrialists, media moguls, bankers and motion picture executives. John D. Rockefeller Jr., Henry Ford, William Randolph Hearst, George Fisher Baker, Harry Warner and Adolph Zukor were among those named. "They themselves are too busy to hold political office, but they determine who shall hold such office", Gerard explained.
- Died: Douglas King, 53, British naval commander and politician, drowned with five others after his yacht, the Islander, sank in rough weather off the coast of Cornwall.

== Thursday, August 21, 1930 ==
- Viceroy of India Lord Irwin received a letter written from prison by Mahatma Gandhi outlining his terms for cessation of the civil disobedience campaign.
- Born: Princess Margaret, Countess of Snowdon, at Glamis Castle in Scotland (d. 2002)
- Died: Sir Aston Webb, 81, British architect

== Friday, August 22, 1930 ==
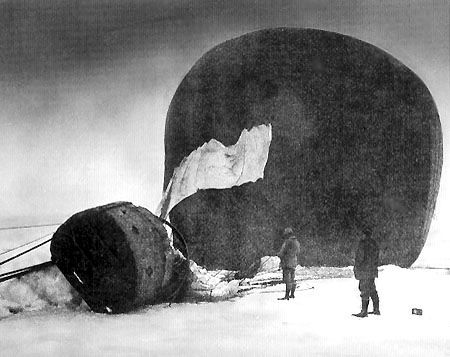
Photo of the crashed balloon Ornen, developed 33 years after it had been taken

- Copenhagen newspapers reported the discovery in the Arctic of the remains of explorer Salomon August Andrée, along with two partners, Knut Frænkel and photographer Nils Strindberg, almost 33 years after they had last been seen alive. The three had disappeared in 1897, after embarking on an attempt to reach the North Pole in a balloon. Strindberg's undeveloped photograph of the crashed balloon, Ornen, was found and would be printed.
- The Bengal legislative council passed a bill giving authorities the right to imprison terrorists for five years without trial.
- Australia won the Ashes series (the best 3 of 5 Test Cricket series between the teams of England and Australia), taking the fifth Test by an innings and 39 runs, or 695 runs to 405.
- Albert Einstein made the opening speech of the Seventh German Radio Show in Berlin. It began with the famous words, "Ladies and gentlemen who are present and who are not! When you hear the radio, think also about how people have come to possess such a wonderful tool of communication."
- Born: Gylmar dos Santos Neves (known popularly as "Gilmar"), Brazilian national team goalkeeper in three World Cups; in Santos, São Paulo (d. 2013)

== Saturday, August 23, 1930 ==
- Three were killed and ten injured in Bolesławiec, Silesia, when police clashed with communists who tried to forcibly enter a pre-election meeting of Nazis.

== Sunday, August 24, 1930 ==
- The Sunday Express, a weekly publication looking for a fresh angle to write on the birth of Princess Margaret three days earlier, published an astrology-themed article titled "What the Stars Foretell For The New Princess". The article drew so much interest that the Express made horoscopes a regular column and the newspaper horoscope was born.
- Born: Vera Miles, American actress, in Boise City, Oklahoma
- Died: Tom Norman, 70, English business and showman

== Monday, August 25, 1930 ==
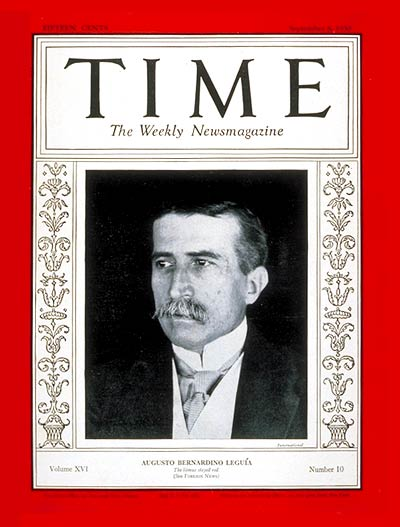
President Leguia

- Peruvian president Augusto B. Leguía resigned under military pressure as his government was toppled in a coup. General Manuel María Ponce Brousset became interim president.
- A League of Nations Mandate Report condemned the British government for failing to provide adequate protection for Jews during Arab riots against Jewish settlers in Palestine.
- The D. W. Griffith-directed film Abraham Lincoln premiered at the Central Theatre in New York City.
- Born: Sean Connery, Scottish stage actor and action film star, best known for his portrayal of James Bond in seven films; in Fountainbridge, Edinburgh (d. 2020)
- Died: Frankie Campbell (born Francesco Camilli), 26, Italian-American boxer, died of injuries sustained in a heavyweight boxing match with Max Baer in San Francisco, California.

== Tuesday, August 26, 1930 ==
- Hack Wilson of the Chicago Cubs hit his 44th home run of the season, a new National League record, during a 7–5 win over the Pittsburgh Pirates.

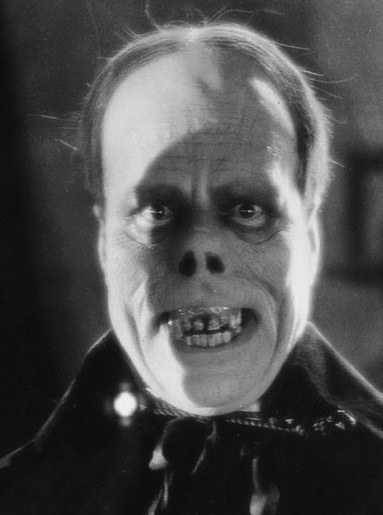
Chaney as the Phantom of the Opera

- Died: Lon Chaney, 47, American silent film actor known as "The Man of a Thousand Faces" for his ability to use makeup to transform himself into various characters on film, died of a throat hemorrhage following a long bout with lung cancer.

== Wednesday, August 27, 1930 ==
- Luis Miguel Sánchez Cerro became the new President of Peru.
- Born: Gholamreza Takhti, popular Iranian wrestler and 1956 Olympic gold medalist; in Tehran (died of gunshot wound, 1968)

== Thursday, August 28, 1930 ==
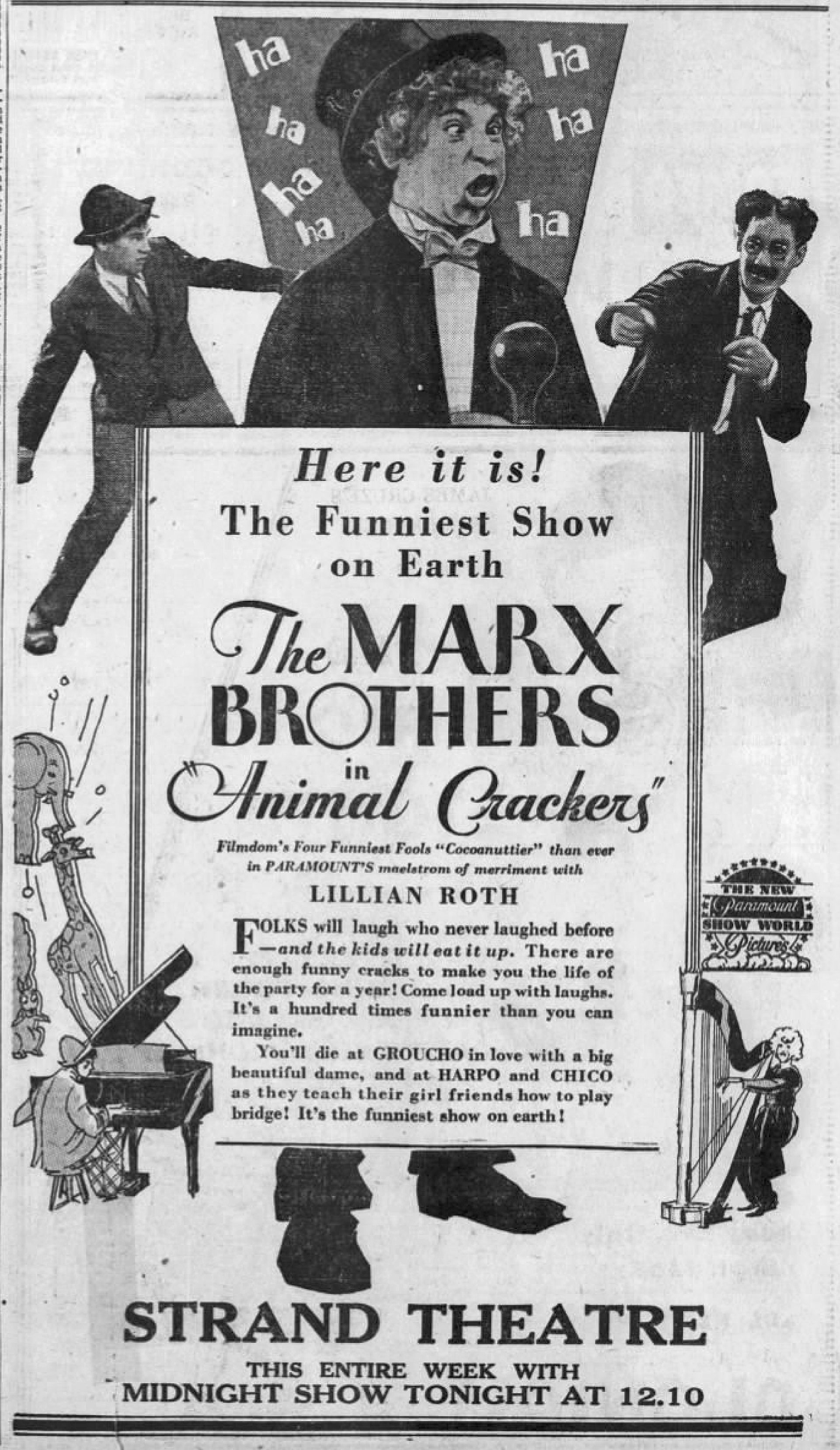
Advertisement for Animal Crackers

- The Marx Brothers comedy film Animal Crackers premiered at the Rialto Theatre in New York City.
- A heat wave in London began, causing the deaths of 24 people on its first day.
- Born:
  - Robert A. Barth, United States Navy Chief Quartermaster and aquanaut; in Manila, Philippines (d. 2020)
  - Ben Gazzara, actor and director; in New York City (d. 2012)
  - Irinej, Serbian Patriarch; in Vidova (d. 2020)

== Friday, August 29, 1930 ==
- The death toll from heat in London and its suburbs rose to 50.
- Sturmabteilung (SA) commander and Schutzstaffel (SS) commander-in-chief Franz Pfeffer von Salomon resigned both posts. Adolf Hitler took personal charge of the two organizations.
- Died: William Archibald Spooner, 86, British scholar and priest

== Saturday, August 30, 1930 ==
- The Federal Trade Commission building in Washington was heavily damaged by fire, destroying many documents.
- A semi-official government newspaper in Yugoslavia announced new rights for German-speaking minorities. Parents would have the right to decide whether to send their children to German or Yugoslavian schools, and the Serbo-Croatian language would not be taught before third year in the German schools.
- The comedy film Doughboys, starring Buster Keaton, was released.
- Born: Warren Buffett, American billionaire, business magnate, investor and philanthropist; in Omaha, Nebraska

== Sunday, August 31, 1930 ==
- The sunken cargo ship SS Egypt was positively identified by Italian divers. The ship sank in the English Channel in May 1922 with $5 million U.S. worth of gold and silver in its hull and efforts to locate it had been ongoing for the past six months.
- Died: Vladan Đorđević, 85, Serbian physician and writer, Prime Minister of Serbia from 1897 to 1900
