= October 1930 =

Month of 1930

<<	October 1930					>>
Su	Mo	Tu	We	Th	Fr	Sa
			1	2	3	4
5	6	7	8	9	10	11
12	13	14	15	16	17	18
19	20	21	22	23	24	25
26	27	28	29	30	31

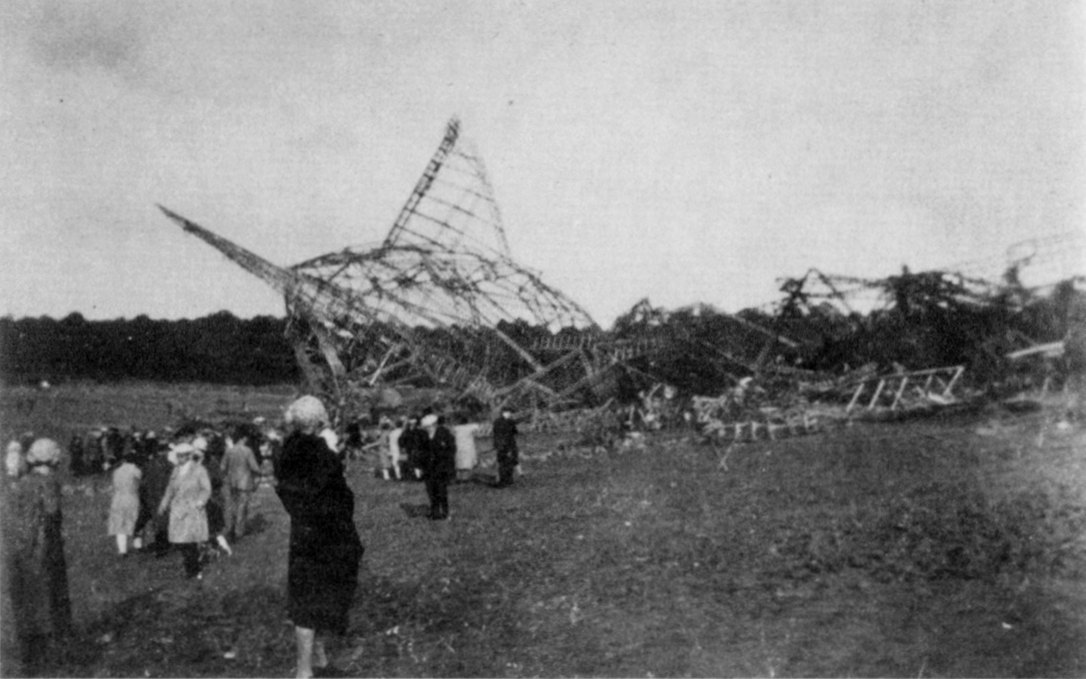
October 5, 1930: Forty-eight airline passengers and crew killed in the crash of the British dirigible R-101

The following events occurred in October 1930:

== Wednesday, October 1, 1930 ==
- The 1930 Imperial Conference, bringing together the representatives of eight nations in the British Empire, opened in London.
- End of Weihaiwei under British rule as it is returned to China.
- Benito Mussolini advocated the death penalty for speculators who brought on financial crises.
- Economist Benjamin Anderson told a life insurance convention at Chicago's Stevens Hotel that the economy was in a state of readjustment and that "forces are at work which will in time generate improvement." He explained that the current depression was caused by the Federal Reserve adopting a "cheap money policy" that tempted banks to borrow. "We must readjust to a situation where we rely on investment savings, business savings, and taxation for capital purposes", Anderson said.
- Born:
  - Richard Harris, Irish actor, singer, film director and writer, in Limerick (d. 2002)
  - Philippe Noiret, French actor, in Lille (d. 2006)
  - George F. Regas, American Episcopal priest, in Knoxville, Tennessee (d. 2021)

== Thursday, October 2, 1930 ==
- Twenty-eight nations signed a pact allowing the League of Nations to provide a financial loan to a country unanimously agreed upon to be a victim of aggression.
- Emperor Hirohito signed the London Naval Treaty, completing Japan's ratification.
- The Social Democratic Party won the Finnish parliamentary election.
- Fourteen English coal miners died in an explosion near Walsall, Staffordshire.
- President Herbert Hoover told the annual meeting of the American Bankers Association in Cleveland, "We have had a severe shock and there has been disorganization in our economic system which has temporarily checked the march of prosperity. But the fundamental assets of the nation, the education, intelligence, virility, and the spiritual strength of our 120 million people have been unimpaired." The economic situation was now being commonly referred to as a depression, as Hoover used that word seventeen times over the course of the speech.
- The film The Big Trail, starring John Wayne in his first leading role, premiered at Grauman's Chinese Theatre in Hollywood.
- Died: Gordon Stewart Nortchott, 23, Canadian-born American serial killer, was hanged

== Friday, October 3, 1930 ==
- A revolution broke out in Brazil against the rule of President Washington Luís.

== Saturday, October 4, 1930 ==
- The Cuban Congress granted the request of President Gerardo Machado to suspend constitutional rights in and around Havana until after general elections on November 1.
- In Germany, the Leipzig Supreme Court sentenced the three Reichswehr officers accused of high treason to eighteen months in prison.

== Sunday, October 5, 1930 ==
- The British airship R101 crashed near Beauvais in France, partway through its flight from London to Karachi, killing 48 passengers and crew. Only six people survived the disaster.
- The comic strip Tobias Seicherl first appeared in Austria.
- Born:
  - Pavel Popovich, cosmonaut, in Uzyn, Kiev Oblast, Soviet Union (d. 2009)
  - Reinhard Selten, economist, in Breslau, Lower Silesia (d. 2016)
- Died:
  - Lord Thomson, 55, British Secretary of State for Air
  - Sir Sefton Brancker, 53, British Director of Civil Aviation. Thomson and Brancker were both killed in the crash of R101.

== Monday, October 6, 1930 ==
- A Lufthansa M-20B plane flying from Berlin to Vienna ran into a strong wind and crashed into a hill near Dresden, killing all 8 passengers and crew.
- Born: Hafez al-Assad, President of Syria, in Qardaha (d. 2000); Richie Benaud, cricketer, in Penrith, New South Wales, Australia (d. 2015)

== Tuesday, October 7, 1930 ==
- Beatrice Warde's essay on typography, "The Crystal Goblet", was delivered as a speech to the British Typographers' Guild at the St Bride Institute in London.
- Hollywood film acting couple Alan Roscoe and Barbara Bedford took a license to remarry after thirty months apart.
- Indian freedom fighters Bhagat Singh, Sukhdev Thapar, and Shivaram Rajguru were sentenced to death.

== Wednesday, October 8, 1930 ==
- The Philadelphia Athletics won their second straight World Series, defeating the St. Louis Cardinals 7–1 in Game 6.
- Born: Toru Takemitsu, Japanese composer and writer, in Tokyo (d. 1996)

== Thursday, October 9, 1930 ==
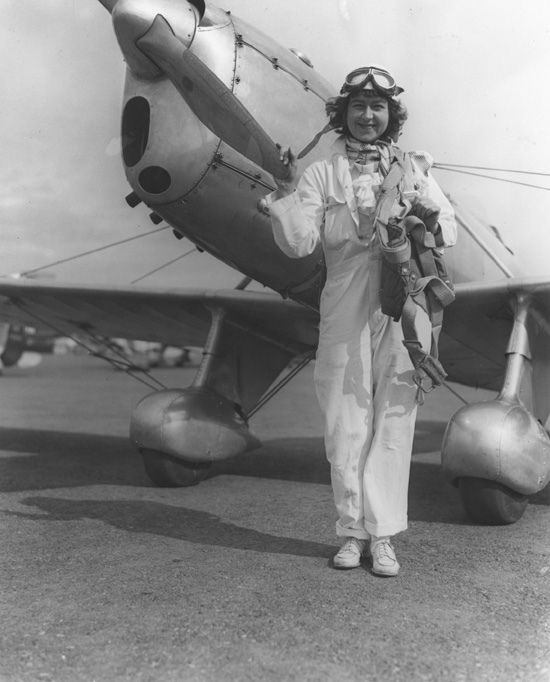
Aviatrix Laura Ingalls

- Laura Ingalls became the first woman to fly across the United States, completing a nine-stop journey from Long Island to Glendale, California, in 30 hours 27 minutes.
- The Dow Jones Industrial Average fell below the 200 point mark, closing at 192 points – little more than half its value from the high water mark of September 3, 1929.

== Friday, October 10, 1930 ==
- A memorial service was held in Westminster Hall for the victims of the R101 tragedy. Thousands of people filed past the 48 flag-draped coffins.
- The New York Yankees named Joe McCarthy as their new manager.
- Born:
  - Yves Chauvin, French chemist and Nobel Prize laureate, in Menen (d. 2015)
  - Harold Pinter, English playwright, and Nobel Prize laureate, in Hackney, London (d. 2008)
- Died: Adolf Engler, 86, German botanist

== Saturday, October 11, 1930 ==
- Jawaharlal Nehru was released from Naini Central Prison.
- Born: Sam Johnson, Korean and Vietnam War fighter pilot, prisoner of war in Vietnam, and U.S. Congressman for Texas from 1991 to 2019; in San Antonio, Texas (d. 2020)

== Sunday, October 12, 1930 ==
- Gangster Legs Diamond was shot five times by gunmen at the Monticello Hotel in New York, but survived.
- In Berlin, 100,000 German socialists held an anti-Nazi rally called by Reichstag President Paul Löbe. Nazis stood on the street heckling the paraders and 38 arrests were made as isolated fistfights broke out.

== Monday, October 13, 1930 ==
- About 300 Nazis dressed in civilian clothes stormed downtown Berlin, smashing windows of mainly Jewish shops and firing pistols into the air as the Reichstag opened its first new session since the September 14 elections. Nazi deputies caused an uproar by turning up in full party uniform, despite a rule against the wearing of such uniforms in the Reichstag.
- Born: Paul Kent, U.S. actor, in Brooklyn (d. 2011)

== Tuesday, October 14, 1930 ==
- The George and Ira Gershwin stage musical Girl Crazy opened at the Alvin Theatre on Broadway.
- Born:
  - Mobutu Sese Seko, President of Zaire from 1965 to 1997; as Joseph-Désiré Mobutu; in Lisala, Belgian Congo (d. 1997)
  - Schafik Handal, Palestinian-Salvadoran Communist politician and presidential candidate, in Usulután, El Salvador (d. 2006)

== Wednesday, October 15, 1930 ==
- Half a million unemployed Germans, including 126,000 striking metal workers, paraded in Berlin.
- Pope Pius XI granted King Boris III of Bulgaria permission to marry Princess Giovanna of Italy, on the written promise from Boris that any children born would be raised as Roman Catholics. The Bulgarian constitution said that the country's monarch must be of Greek Orthodox faith.
- Born:
  - Colin McDonald, English footballer, in Bury
  - FM-2030, Iranian-American transhumanist, futurist and Olympic athlete, as Fereidoon M. Esfandary in Brussels, Belgium (d. 2000)
- Died: Herbert Henry Dow, 64, Canadian-born American chemical industrialist and founder of the Dow Chemical Company

== Thursday, October 16, 1930 ==
- Prohibition leader Bishop James Cannon, Jr. launched a $5 million defamation lawsuit against William Randolph Hearst, accusing Hearst of using his newspapers to bring Cannon "into scandal and disrepute" by printing false statements about him.

== Friday, October 17, 1930 ==
- President Hoover announced the appointment of a new committee tasked with formulating plans for "continuing and strengthening the organization of Federal activities for employment during the winter."
- The magazine L'Ere Nouvelle published a letter by German industrialist Arnold Rechberg, describing an alleged Soviet plot offered to Fascist Italy and the Nazis. According to the plan, Rechberg wrote, Germany and the Soviet Union would simultaneously attack Poland, dividing it between themselves, and would then join together in attacking France. As the French retreated, Italy would cut them off with a sudden flank attack. Rechberg claimed the plot was taken seriously by Hitler's followers and that a communist-fascist alliance would be a danger to peace.
- Born:
  - Robert Atkins, popular American nutritionist known for creating "The Atkins Diet"; in Columbus, Ohio (d. 2003)

== Saturday, October 18, 1930 ==
- The Reichstag granted amnesty for political crimes committed before September 1, 1924, that were not directed against members of the federal government.
- The Geoffrey Kerr comedy play London Calling opened at the Little Theatre in Rochester, New York.

== Sunday, October 19, 1930 ==
- In an early morning vote capping a fourteen-hour session, Chancellor Heinrich Brüning passed a confidence motion, 318–236. The Reichstag then adjourned until December 3.
- Charles Kingsford Smith landed at Port Darwin, completing a flight from England to Australia in the new record time of ten-and-a-half days.
- Mohammed Nadir Shah was officially crowned King of Afghanistan in a simple ceremony.
- Born: Jody Lawrance, American actress, in Fort Worth, Texas (d. 1986)

== Monday, October 20, 1930 ==
- The Passfield white paper outlining British policy in Palestine was issued, laying out a plan to give more self-government to both Jews and Arabs in Palestine. The paper angered Zionists who said it backtracked on the 1917 Balfour Declaration which had pledged a national home for the Jews.
- Chaim Weizmann resigned as president of the Jewish Agency for Palestine in protest against Britain's policy on Palestine.
- The Labour Party won Norwegian parliamentary elections.
- Bugs Moran was arrested in an early morning police raid and arraigned in Chicago court in charges of vagrancy and carrying concealed weapons.
- Painted Dreams, the first daytime soap opera, premiered on WGN radio in Chicago.
- Died: General Valeriano Weyler, 1st Duke of Rubí, 92, Spanish Army officer

== Tuesday, October 21, 1930 ==
- A mine explosion in Alsdorf in Germany killed 271 miners.
- The Hope Simpson Enquiry on Palestine was released.

== Wednesday, October 22, 1930 ==
- An amended constitution was enacted in Egypt, eliminating the clause making the cabinet answerable to Parliament.
- The Dutch football club SC Genemuiden was founded.

== Thursday, October 23, 1930 ==
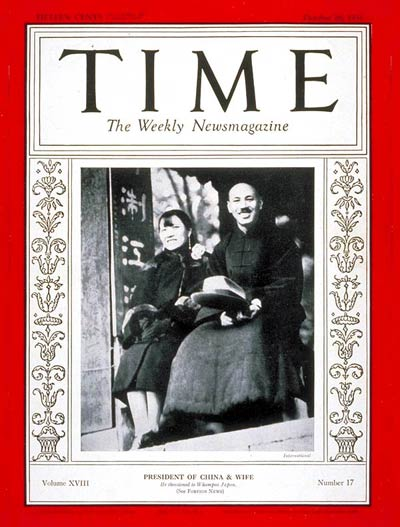
Chiang Kai-shek and his wife, Soong Mei-ling, a year after his conversion from Buddhist to Christian

- Chiang Kai-shek converted to Christianity in a baptism ceremony in Shanghai.
- Warsaw Jews threw stones at the British consulate building in protest of British policy on Palestine.
- The war film War Nurse premiered at the Astor Theatre in New York City.
- Died: Joe Aiello, 39, Chicago mobster, was shot to death

== Friday, October 24, 1930 ==
- Brazil's three-week civil war ended in rebel victory as President Washington Luís resigned.
- Born: Jiles Perry Richardson Jr., American rock musician and disc jockey known as "The Big Bopper"; in Sabine Pass, Texas (killed in plane crash, 1959)
- Died: Harry Gosling, 69, British Labour Party politician and President of the Transport and General Workers' Union since 1922

== Saturday, October 25, 1930 ==
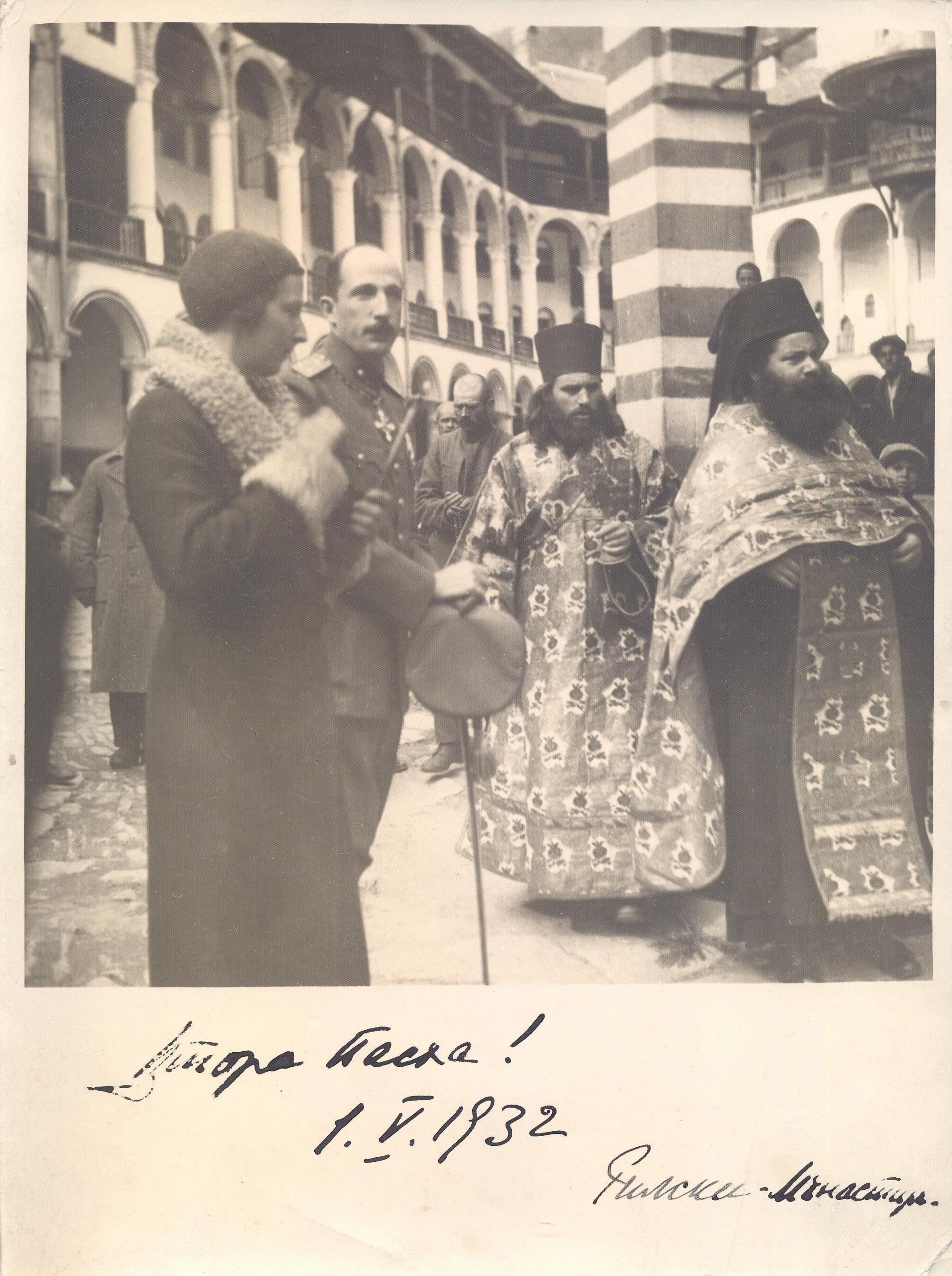
King Boris III and Queen Giovanna

- King Boris III of Bulgaria and Giovanna of Italy were married at the Basilica of San Francesco d'Assisi in Italy.
- Germany experienced its second mining disaster in a week as 98 were killed in an explosion at the Maybach Mine at Quierschied.
- The New South Wales state election was held in Australia. The Labor Party led by Jack Lang was swept into power.
- Syrian Prime Minister Taj al-Din al-Hasani survived an assassination attempt. An assailant tried to shoot him, but missed and was apprehended before he could fire a second shot.

== Sunday, October 26, 1930 ==
- Australian pilot Jessie Miller established a new women's west–east transcontinental flight record, completing a flight from Los Angeles to New York in 21 hours 47 minutes.
- Died: H. P. Whitney, 58, American businessman and horsebreeder

== Monday, October 27, 1930 ==
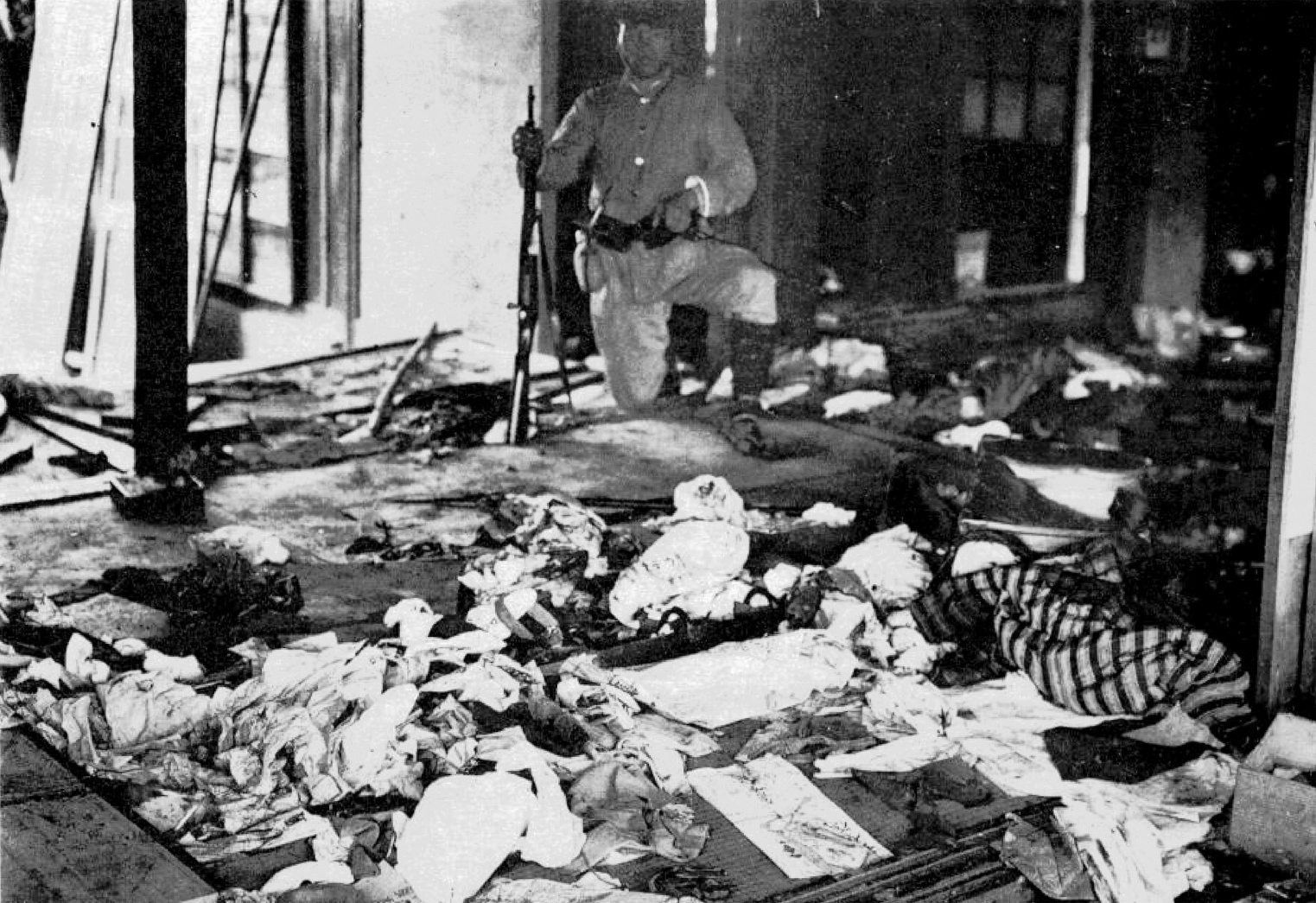
Aftermath of the Wushe Incident

- The Wushe Incident began in Taiwan when Seediq rebels raided Japanese facilities for weapons and then attacked the Japanese at an elementary school.
- Benito Mussolini made a speech in the hall of the Palazzo Venezia saying he could foresee "a Fascist Europe which seeks the inspiration for its doctrines and its practices from Fascism, a Europe which solves, as Fascism does, the problems of a modern state in the twentieth century." Mussolini also accused Europe of hypocrisy when it "babbled about peace at Geneva but prepared for war everywhere", and claimed that Italy was only arming in self-defense.

== Tuesday, October 28, 1930 ==
- King George V opened the seventh parliament of his reign.
- The German steelworker's strike was settled with the workers agreeing to a 3% wage reduction.
- Apple vendors became a common sight on New York city streets on the first day of a project to put unemployed people to work selling surplus apples. The project began in the Wall Street district and soon spread across the city. These apple sellers, accompanied by placards declaring their unemployed status and encouraging the public to buy apples, became one of the enduring images of the Great Depression even though the project lasted less than a year as the supply of cheap apples eventually ran out.
- Born: Bernie Ecclestone, English business magnate, and Chief Executive of the Formula One Group; in Bungay, Suffolk

== Wednesday, October 29, 1930 ==
- Sixteen people were killed in the derailment of the Geneva to Bordeaux express train.
- Born:
  - Bertha Brouwer, Dutch sprinter, in Leidschendam (d. 2006)
  - Natalie Sleeth, U.S. composer, in Evanston, Illinois (d. 1992)
  - Omara Portuondo, Cuban singer and dancer, in Havana

== Thursday, October 30, 1930 ==
- Turkey and Greece signed a treaty of friendship.
- Born: Timothy Findley, Canadian novelist and playwright, in Toronto (d. 2002)

== Friday, October 31, 1930 ==
- A Paris court granted actress Pola Negri a divorce from Prince Serge Mdivani. "I am happy to have finished with the divorce so I can consecrate my life entirely to art", Negri stated.
- Born: Michael Collins, U.S. astronaut who piloted the lunar orbiter during the Apollo 11 mission; in Rome, to U.S. military attaché to Italy James Lawton Collins and Virginia Stewart Collins (d. 2021)
