= 145th =

145th is the ordinal form of the number 145. 145th or One hundred and forty-fifth may also refer to:

- A fraction, 1/145, equal to one of 145 equal parts

== Geography ==
- 145th meridian east, a line of longitude
- 145th meridian west, a line of longitude
- 145th Street (disambiguation)

== Military ==
- 145th Brigade (disambiguation)
- 145th Division (disambiguation)
- 145th Regiment (disambiguation)

== See also ==
- May 25, 145th day of the year in a standard year
