= 36th meridian =

36th meridian may refer to:

- 36th meridian east, a line of longitude east of the Greenwich Meridian
- 36th meridian west, a line of longitude west of the Greenwich Meridian
