= 143rd =

143rd is the ordinal form of the number 143. 143rd or One hundred and forty-third may also refer to:

- A fraction, 1/143, equal to one of 143 equal parts

== Geography ==
- 143rd meridian east, a line of longitude
- 143rd meridian west, a line of longitude

== Military ==
- 143rd Brigade (disambiguation)
- 143rd Division (disambiguation)
- 143rd Regiment (disambiguation)

== See also ==
- May 23, 143rd day of the year in a standard year
