= 144th meridian =

144th meridian may refer to:

- 144th meridian east, a line of longitude east of the Greenwich Meridian
- 144th meridian west, a line of longitude west of the Greenwich Meridian

144th meridian west	144th meridian east
