= 145th meridian =

145th meridian may refer to:

- 145th meridian east, a line of longitude east of the Greenwich Meridian
- 145th meridian west, a line of longitude west of the Greenwich Meridian

| 145th meridian west | 145th meridian east |
