= JTM =

JTM may refer to:

- Jordan Transverse Mercator, a grid system
- Jornal Tribuna de Macau, a Portuguese newspaper in Macau
- Marshall JTM45, a guitar amplifier
- Jasons Travel Media, a New Zealand website
- JTM (born 1986), an American rapper
- Jati Mulya LRT station, a light rail station in Jakarta, Indonesia
