= 143rd Division =

143rd Division may refer to:

- 143rd Division "Firefox", Israel
- 143rd Division (Imperial Japanese Army)
- 143rd Division (People's Republic of China, first formation)
- 143rd Division (People's Republic of China, second formation)
- 143rd Division (People's Republic of China, third formation)
- 143rd Rifle Division, Soviet Union

== See also ==
- List of military divisions by number
- 143rd Brigade (disambiguation)
- 143rd Regiment (disambiguation)
- 143rd Squadron (disambiguation)
- 143rd (disambiguation)
