= 143rd meridian =

143rd meridian may refer to:

- 143rd meridian east, a line of longitude east of the Greenwich Meridian
- 143rd meridian west, a line of longitude west of the Greenwich Meridian

143rd meridian west	143rd meridian east
