= Hornodden =

Headland of Kvitøya, Svalbard

- Cape
- Coordinates: 80°08′33″N 33°21′49″E
- Location: Kvitøya, Svalbard, Norway

Hornodden is headland at the southeastern point of the island of Kvitøya in the Svalbard archipelago. It is named after geologist and Arctic explorer Gunnar Horn, leader of the Bratvaag Expedition to Kvitøya in 1930.

== See also ==
- Andréeneset
