= Jordan Transverse Mercator =

Jordan Transverse Mercator (JTM) (Arabic: نظام تربيع ميركاتور الأردني المستعرض) is a projected coordinate system defined by the Royal Jordan Geographic Center (RJGC). This system is based on 6° belts with a central meridian of 37° East and a scale factor at origin (mo) = 0.9998. The JTM is based on the Hayford ellipsoid adopted by the IUGG in 1924.

No transformation parameters are presently offered by the government. However, Prof. Stephen H. Savage of Arizona State University provides the following parameters for the projection:

Jordan Transverse Mercator 
Geographic Coordinate System: GCS_International_1924
Datum: D:International_1924
Spheroid: International_1924
   Axis: 6378388
   Flattening: 297
Prime Meridian: Greenwich
   Prime Meridian Longitude: 0
Units: Degree
   Unit Scale Factor: 0.017453292519943295

Projection: Transverse Mercator
   False Easting: 500,000
   False Northing: -3,000,000
   Central Meridian: 37
   Scale Factor: 0.9998
   Central Parallel: 0
Units: Meter
   Scale Factor 1
Three-parameter transformation to [[WGS84]] is: 
   ΔX = –86 meters
   ΔY = –98 meters
   ΔZ = –119 meters

Prof. Savage also offers software, ReprojectME!, which will convert coordinates between JTM and other systems. (See http://daahl.ucsd.edu/gaialab/# for more information.)

The central meridian of 37° East is roughly midway between the extremes of Jordan: the Karameh Border Crossing with Iraq is close to 39° East, while the city of Aqaba on the Red Sea is close to 35° East.

== See also ==
- Jordan
- Mercator projection
