= 35th meridian =

35th meridian may refer to:

- 35th meridian east, a line of longitude east of the Greenwich Meridian
- 35th meridian west, a line of longitude west of the Greenwich Meridian
