= 37th meridian =

37th meridian may refer to:

- 37th meridian east, a line of longitude east of the Greenwich Meridian
- 37th meridian west, a line of longitude west of the Greenwich Meridian
