= 32nd meridian east =

Line of longitude

32nd meridian east

The meridian 32° east of Greenwich is a line of longitude that extends from the North Pole across the Arctic Ocean, Europe, Turkey, Africa, the Indian Ocean, the Southern Ocean, and Antarctica to the South Pole.

The 32nd meridian east forms a great circle with the 148th meridian west.

== From Pole to Pole ==
Starting at the North Pole and heading south to the South Pole, the 32nd meridian east passes through:

Co-ordinates	Country, territory or sea	Notes
90°0′N 32°0′E	Arctic Ocean	
80°14′N 32°0′E	Norway	Island of Kvitøya, Svalbard
80°4′N 32°0′E	Barents Sea	
69°56′N 32°0′E	Russia	Murmansk Oblast, Republic of Karelia Passing through Lake Ladoga Leningrad Oblast Novgorod Oblast Tver Oblast Smolensk Oblast
53°48′N 32°0′E	Belarus	
53°5′N 32°0′E	Russia	Bryansk Oblast
52°1′N 32°0′E	Ukraine	
46°11′N 32°0′E	Black Sea	
41°33′N 32°0′E	Turkey	For 558 km.
36°22′N 32°0′E	Mediterranean Sea	
31°25′N 32°0′E	Egypt	
22°0′N 32°0′E	Sudan	
10°39′N 32°0′E	South Sudan	
3°35′N 32°0′E	Uganda	
0°5′S 32°0′E	Lake Victoria	
0°15′S 32°0′E	Uganda	
0°18′S 32°0′E	Lake Victoria	
2°15′S 32°0′E	Tanzania	Passing through Lake Rukwa
9°4′S 32°0′E	Zambia	
14°24′S 32°0′E	Mozambique	
16°26′S 32°0′E	Zimbabwe	
21°44′S 32°0′E	Mozambique	
24°22′S 32°0′E	South Africa	Mpumalanga
25°25′S 32°0′E	Mozambique	For about 11km
25°31′S 32°0′E	South Africa	Mpumalanga - for about 16km
25°40′S 32°0′E	Mozambique	
25°59′S 32°0′E	Eswatini	
26°54′S 32°0′E	South Africa	KwaZulu-Natal
28°53′S 32°0′E	Indian Ocean	
60°0′S 32°0′E	Southern Ocean	
69°4′S 32°0′E	Antarctica	Queen Maud Land, claimed by Norway

== See also ==
- 31st meridian east
- 33rd meridian east
