= 34th meridian east =

Line of longitude

34th meridian east

The meridian 34° east of Greenwich is a line of longitude that extends from the North Pole across the Arctic Ocean, Europe, Turkey, Africa, the Indian Ocean, the Southern Ocean, and Antarctica to the South Pole.

The 34th meridian east forms a great circle with the 146th meridian west.

== From Pole to Pole ==
Starting at the North Pole and heading south to the South Pole, the 34th meridian east passes through:

Co-ordinates	Country, territory or sea	Notes
90°0′N 34°0′E	Arctic Ocean	
80°16′N 34°0′E	Barents Sea	Passing just east of the island of Kvitøya, Svalbard, Norway
69°22′N 34°0′E	Russia	Kildin Island and Kola Peninsula
66°41′N 34°0′E	White Sea	Kandalaksha Gulf
66°13′N 34°0′E	Russia	
52°12′N 34°0′E	Ukraine	Passing through Crimea (from 46°6′N 34°0′E, claimed and controlled by Russia)
44°24′N 34°0′E	Black Sea	
41°59′N 34°0′E	Turkey	
36°16′N 34°0′E	Mediterranean Sea	
35°27′N 34°0′E	Cyprus	Karpass Peninsula - controlled by Northern Cyprus
35°19′N 34°0′E	Mediterranean Sea	
35°4′N 34°0′E	Cyprus	
34°59′N 34°0′E	Mediterranean Sea	
31°12′N 34°0′E	Egypt	Sinai Peninsula
27°53′N 34°0′E	Red Sea	
27°31′N 34°0′E	Egypt	Island of Shadwan
27°28′N 34°0′E	Red Sea	
26°52′N 34°0′E	Egypt	
22°0′N 34°0′E	Bir Tawil	Not claimed by any country
21°46′N 34°0′E	Sudan	
9°30′N 34°0′E	South Sudan	
8°30′N 34°0′E	Ethiopia	
7°24′N 34°0′E	South Sudan	
4°13′N 34°0′E	Kenya	For about 1km at the extreme north-west of the country
4°13′N 34°0′E	Uganda	
0°14′N 34°0′E	Kenya	
0°0′N 34°0′E	Lake Victoria	
0°26′S 34°0′E	Kenya	Mfangano Island
0°29′S 34°0′E	Lake Victoria	
1°6′S 34°0′E	Tanzania	
9°30′S 34°0′E	Lake Malawi	
10°3′S 34°0′E	Malawi	
14°29′S 34°0′E	Mozambique	
25°1′S 34°0′E	Indian Ocean	
60°0′S 34°0′E	Southern Ocean	
68°36′S 34°0′E	Antarctica	Queen Maud Land, claimed by Norway

== See also ==
- 33rd meridian east
- 35th meridian east
