= 141st meridian =

141st meridian may refer to:

- 141st meridian east, a line of longitude east of the Greenwich Meridian
- 141st meridian west, a line of longitude west of the Greenwich Meridian

| 141st meridian west | 141st meridian east |
