= 148th meridian =

148th meridian may refer to:

- 148th meridian east, a line of longitude east of the Greenwich Meridian
- 148th meridian west, a line of longitude west of the Greenwich Meridian

148th meridian west	148th meridian east
