= 33rd meridian east =

Line of longitude

33rd meridian east (interactive map)

The meridian 33° east of Greenwich is a line of longitude that extends from the North Pole across the Arctic Ocean, Europe, Turkey, Africa, the Indian Ocean, the Southern Ocean, and Antarctica to the South Pole.

The 33rd meridian east forms a great circle with the 147th meridian west.

== From Pole to Pole ==
Starting at the North Pole and heading south to the South Pole, the 33rd meridian east passes through:

| Co-ordinates | Country, territory or sea | Notes |
|---|---|---|
| 90°0′N 33°0′E | Arctic Ocean | |
| 80°19′N 33°0′E | Norway | Island of Kvitøya, Svalbard |
| 80°8′N 33°0′E | Barents Sea | |
| 69°45′N 33°0′E | Russia | Rybachy Peninsula |
| 69°36′N 33°0′E | Barents Sea | Motovsky Gulf |
| 69°27′N 33°0′E | Russia | Kola Peninsula |
| 66°53′N 33°0′E | White Sea | Kandalaksha Gulf |
| 66°42′N 33°0′E | Russia | |
| 52°16′N 33°0′E | Ukraine | |
| 46°1′N 33°0′E | Black Sea | Karkinit Bay |
| 45°41′N 33°0′E | Ukraine | Crimea (claimed and controlled by Russia) |
| 45°19′N 33°0′E | Black Sea | |
| 41°55′N 33°0′E | Turkey | Passing just east of Ankara |
| 36°6′N 33°0′E | Mediterranean Sea | |
| 35°22′N 33°0′E | Cyprus | Area controlled by Northern Cyprus (claimed by the Republic of Cyprus); The United Nations Buffer Zone in Cyprus; Area controlled by the Republic of Cyprus |
| 34°38′N 33°0′E | Akrotiri | United Kingdom Sovereign Base Area (not part of the territory of the Republic of Cyprus) |
| 34°34′N 33°0′E | Mediterranean Sea | |
| 31°10′N 33°0′E | Egypt | Sinai Peninsula |
| 39°10′N 33°0′E | Gulf of Suez | |
| 28°29′N 33°0′E | Egypt | |
| 22°0′N 33°0′E | Sudan | |
| 12°13′N 33°0′E | South Sudan | |
| 3°52′N 33°0′E | Uganda | |
| 0°7′N 33°0′E | Lake Victoria | Passing just west of Ukara Island, Tanzania |
| 1°59′S 33°0′E | Tanzania | Ukerewe Island |
| 2°6′S 33°0′E | Lake Victoria | |
| 2°22′S 33°0′E | Tanzania | |
| 9°22′S 33°0′E | Malawi | For about 14 km |
| 9°30′S 33°0′E | Zambia | |
| 12°42′S 33°0′E | Malawi | For about 18 km |
| 12°53′S 33°0′E | Zambia | For about 14 km |
| 13°0′S 33°0′E | Malawi | For about 19 km |
| 13°10′S 33°0′E | Zambia | For about 5 km |
| 13°13′S 33°0′E | Malawi | |
| 13°57′S 33°0′E | Zambia | For about 3 km |
| 13°58′S 33°0′E | Malawi | For about 5 km |
| 14°1′S 33°0′E | Zambia | For about 6 km |
| 14°5′S 33°0′E | Mozambique | |
| 17°18′S 33°0′E | Zimbabwe | For about 13 km |
| 17°25′S 33°0′E | Mozambique | For about 16 km |
| 17°34′S 33°0′E | Zimbabwe | |
| 17°48′S 33°0′E | Mozambique | |
| 18°13′S 33°0′E | Zimbabwe | |
| 18°29′S 33°0′E | Mozambique | |
| 19°45′S 33°0′E | Zimbabwe | |
| 20°1′S 33°0′E | Mozambique | |
| 25°28′S 33°0′E | Indian Ocean | Passing just east of Inhaca Island and the mainland, Mozambique |
| 60°0′S 33°0′E | Southern Ocean | |
| 69°31′S 33°0′E | Antarctica | Queen Maud Land, claimed by Norway |

== See also ==
- 32nd meridian east
- 34th meridian east
