= 31st meridian east =

Line of longitude

31st meridian east

The meridian 31° east of Greenwich is a line of longitude that extends from the North Pole across the Arctic Ocean, Europe, Turkey, Africa, the Indian Ocean, the Southern Ocean, and Antarctica to the South Pole.

The 31st meridian east forms a great circle with the 149th meridian west.

== From Pole to Pole ==
Starting at the North Pole and heading south to the South Pole, the 31st meridian east passes through:

Co-ordinates	Country, territory or sea	Notes
90°0′N 31°0′E	Arctic Ocean	
80°10′N 31°0′E	Barents Sea	Passing just west of Kvitøya, Svalbard, Norway; Passing just east of Kong Karls Land, Svalbard, Norway
70°25′N 31°0′E	Norway	Varanger Peninsula - easternmost point of the country
70°16′N 31°0′E	Varangerfjord	
69°46′N 31°0′E	Russia	
63°18′N 31°0′E	Finland	
62°22′N 31°0′E	Russia	Passing through Lake Ladoga and Lake Ilmen
55°9′N 31°0′E	Belarus	For about 3 km
55°7′N 31°0′E	Russia	For about 4 km
55°5′N 31°0′E	Belarus	For about 7 km
55°1′N 31°0′E	Russia	
54°43′N 31°0′E	Belarus	For about 3 km
54°41′N 31°0′E	Russia	For about 2 km
54°40′N 31°0′E	Belarus	
52°4′N 31°0′E	Ukraine	For about 610 km.
46°35′N 31°0′E	Black Sea	
41°5′N 31°0′E	Turkey	For 474 km.
36°52′N 31°0′E	Mediterranean Sea	
31°35′N 31°0′E	Egypt	Passing just west of Cairo
22°0′N 31°0′E	Sudan	
9°45′N 31°0′E	South Sudan	
3°42′N 31°0′E	Uganda	
2°24′N 31°0′E	Democratic Republic of the Congo	
1°56′N 31°0′E	Lake Albert	
1°32′N 31°0′E	Uganda	
1°0′S 31°0′E	Tanzania	
8°16′S 31°0′E	Lake Tanganyika	
8°46′S 31°0′E	Zambia	
14°44′S 31°0′E	Mozambique	
16°3′S 31°0′E	Zimbabwe	Passing just west of Harare
22°19′S 31°0′E	South Africa	Limpopo; Mpumalanga - passing just east of Mbombela (formerly Nelspruit)
26°12′S 31°0′E	Eswatini	
27°2′S 31°0′E	South Africa	Mpumalanga; KwaZulu-Natal - passing through Durban
29°57′S 31°0′E	Indian Ocean	
60°0′S 31°0′E	Southern Ocean	
69°2′S 31°0′E	Antarctica	Queen Maud Land, claimed by Norway

== See also ==
- 30th meridian east
- 32nd meridian east
