= 145th Division =

145th Division may refer to:

- 145th Division (1st Formation) (People's Republic of China), 1948–1952
- 145th Division (2nd Formation) (People's Republic of China), 1969–1978
- 145th Division (Imperial Japanese Army)
- 145th Motor Rifle Division Soviet Union/Russia, Cold War
- 145th Rifle Division, Soviet Union, WWII

== See also ==
- List of military divisions by number
- 145th Brigade (disambiguation)
- 145th Regiment (disambiguation)
- 145th Squadron (disambiguation)
- 145th (disambiguation)
