= 143rd Brigade =

143rd Brigade may refer to:

- 143rd Mechanized Brigade, Ukraine
- 143rd Infantry Brigade (United Kingdom)

== See also ==
- 143rd Division (disambiguation)
- 143rd Regiment (disambiguation)
