= 142nd meridian =

142nd meridian may refer to:

- 142nd meridian east, a line of longitude east of the Greenwich Meridian
- 142nd meridian west, a line of longitude west of the Greenwich Meridian

142nd meridian west	142nd meridian east
