= 146th meridian =

146th meridian may refer to:

- 146th meridian east, a line of longitude east of the Greenwich Meridian
- 146th meridian west, a line of longitude west of the Greenwich Meridian

146th meridian west	146th meridian east
