= 147th meridian =

147th meridian may refer to:

- 147th meridian east, a line of longitude east of the Greenwich Meridian
- 147th meridian west, a line of longitude west of the Greenwich Meridian

147th meridian west	147th meridian east
