= Kvitøyjøkulen =

Glacier in Svalbard

Coordinates: 80.2129°N 32.6282°E

Kvitøyjøkulen is a large icecap on the island of Kvitøya in the Svalbard archipelago. The icecap covers most of the island, which has an area between 600 and 700 square kilometers.
