= 36th meridian east =

Line of longitude

36th meridian east

The meridian 36° east of Greenwich is a line of longitude that extends from the North Pole across the Arctic Ocean, Europe, Asia, Africa, the Indian Ocean, the Southern Ocean, and Antarctica to the South Pole.

The 36th meridian east forms a great circle with the 144th meridian west.

== From Pole to Pole ==
Starting at the North Pole and heading south to the South Pole, the 36th meridian east passes through:

Co-ordinates	Country, territory or sea	Notes
90°0′N 36°0′E	Arctic Ocean	
80°19′N 36°0′E	Barents Sea	Passing just west of Victoria Island, Russia
69°7′N 36°0′E	Russia	Kola Peninsula
66°20′N 36°0′E	White Sea	
65°11′N 36°0′E	Russia	Solovetsky Islands
64°59′N 36°0′E	White Sea	
64°11′N 36°0′E	Russia	Passing through Lake Onega
50°27′N 36°0′E	Ukraine	
46°39′N 36°0′E	Sea of Azov	
45°22′N 36°0′E	Ukraine	Crimea (claimed and controlled by Russia)
45°2′N 36°0′E	Black Sea	
41°43′N 36°0′E	Turkey	
36°55′N 36°0′E	Mediterranean Sea	Gulf of İskenderun
36°29′N 36°0′E	Turkey	
35°56′N 36°0′E	Syria	
34°39′N 36°0′E	Lebanon	
33°43′N 36°0′E	Syria	For about 11km
33°37′N 36°0′E	Lebanon	For about 10km
33°32′N 36°0′E	Syria	
32°40′N 36°0′E	Jordan	Passing just east of Amman
29°12′N 36°0′E	Saudi Arabia	
26°56′N 36°0′E	Red Sea	Passing just west of Rocky Island, Egypt
22°41′N 36°0′E	Hala'ib Triangle	Disputed territory, controlled by Egypt and claimed by Sudan
22°0′N 36°0′E	Sudan	
12°43′N 36°0′E	Ethiopia	The border with Kenya is in Lake Turkana
4°29′N 36°0′E	Kenya	
2°5′S 36°0′E	Tanzania	
11°30′S 36°0′E	Mozambique	
18°56′S 36°0′E	Indian Ocean	
60°0′S 36°0′E	Southern Ocean	
69°24′S 36°0′E	Antarctica	Queen Maud Land, claimed by Norway

== See also ==
- 35th meridian east
- 37th meridian east
