= 38th meridian east =

Line of longitude

38th meridian east (interactive map)

The meridian 38° east of Greenwich is a line of longitude that extends from the North Pole across the Arctic Ocean, Europe, Asia, Africa, the Indian Ocean, the Southern Ocean, and Antarctica to the South Pole.

The 38th meridian east forms a great circle with the 142nd meridian west.

== From Pole to Pole ==
Starting at the North Pole and heading south to the South Pole, the 38th meridian east passes through:

Co-ordinates	Country, territory or sea	Notes
90°0′N 38°0′E	Arctic Ocean	
81°0′N 38°0′E	Queen Victoria Sea	
80°23′N 38°0′E	Barents Sea	
68°33′N 38°0′E	Russia	Kola Peninsula
66°4′N 38°0′E	White Sea	
64°52′N 38°0′E	Russia	Onega Peninsula
64°8′N 38°0′E	White Sea	Onega Bay
63°55′N 38°0′E	Russia	
49°58′N 38°0′E	Ukraine	Passing through Horlivka
47°6′N 38°0′E	Sea of Azov	Taganrog Bay
46°38′N 38°0′E	Russia	
46°24′N 38°0′E	Sea of Azov	
46°2′N 38°0′E	Russia	
44°34′N 38°0′E	Black Sea	
40°59′N 38°0′E	Turkey	
36°48′N 38°0′E	Syria	
32°57′N 38°0′E	Jordan	
31°44′N 38°0′E	Saudi Arabia	
24°6′N 38°0′E	Red Sea	
18°47′N 38°0′E	Sudan	Island of Talla Talla
18°46′N 38°0′E	Red Sea	
18°29′N 38°0′E	Sudan	
17°33′N 38°0′E	Eritrea	
14°46′N 38°0′E	Ethiopia	
3°44′N 38°0′E	Kenya	
3°49′S 38°0′E	Tanzania	
11°17′S 38°0′E	Mozambique	
17°20′S 38°0′E	Indian Ocean	Passing just east of the Prince Edward Islands, South Africa
60°0′S 38°0′E	Southern Ocean	
69°47′S 38°0′E	Antarctica	Queen Maud Land, claimed by Norway

== See also ==
- 37th meridian east
- 39th meridian east
