= Andréeneset =

Headland of Kvitøya, Svalbard

Coordinates: 80.0841°N 31.4281°E

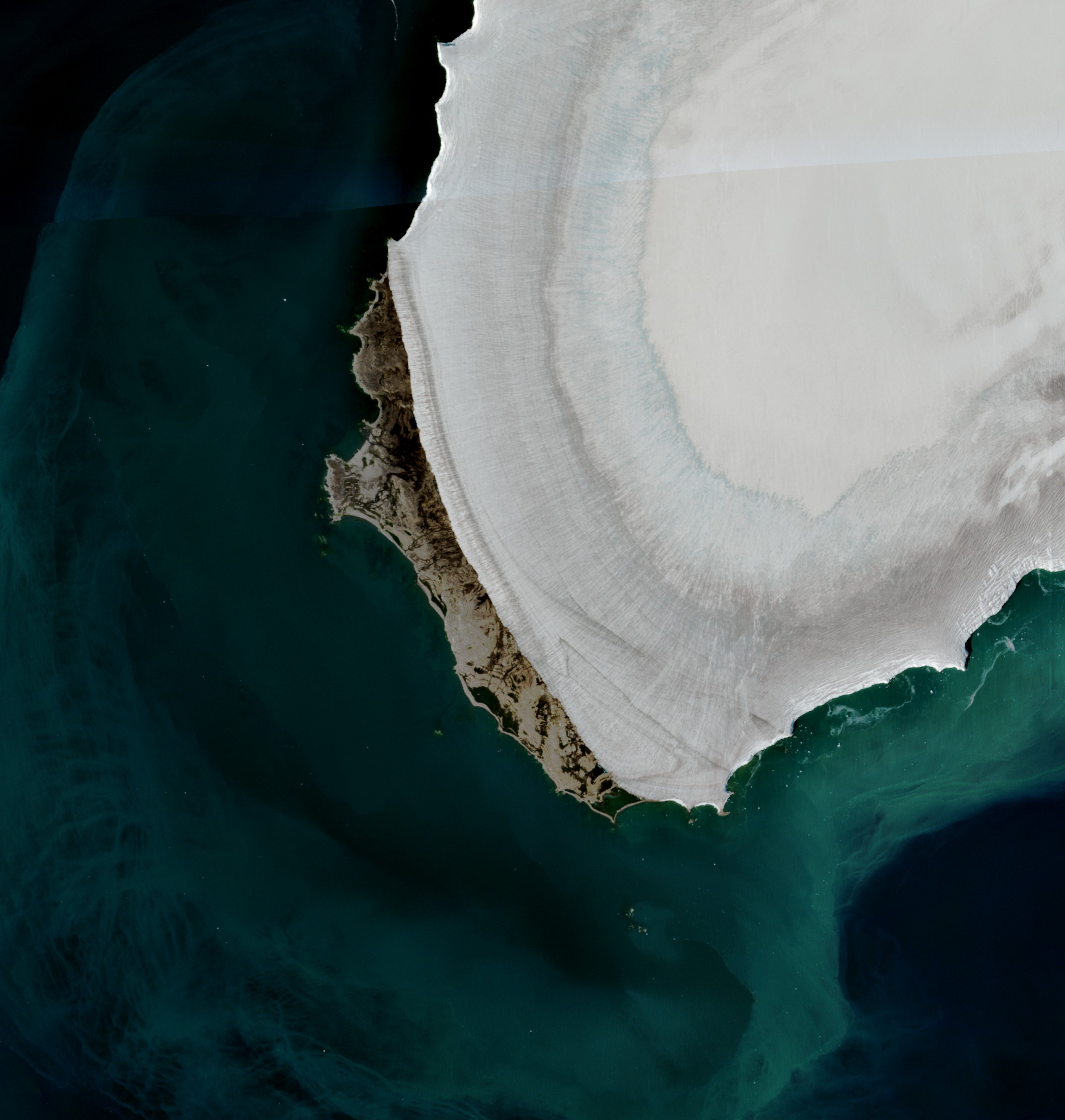
Sentinel-2 image (2020)

Andréeneset is headland at the southwestern point of the island of Kvitøya in the Norwegian Svalbard archipelago in the Arctic Ocean. One of the few ice-free land areas on the island, it is barren and rocky. It is named after engineer and Arctic explorer Salomon August Andrée.

== See also ==
- Hornodden
