= 148th meridian west =

Line of longitude

148th meridian west

The meridian 148° west of Greenwich is a line of longitude that extends from the North Pole across the Arctic Ocean, North America, the Pacific Ocean, the Southern Ocean, and Antarctica to the South Pole.

The 148th meridian west forms a great circle with the 32nd meridian east.

== From Pole to Pole ==
Starting at the North Pole and heading south to the South Pole, the 148th meridian west passes through:

Co-ordinates	Country, territory or sea	Notes
90°0′N 148°0′W	Arctic Ocean	
72°38′N 148°0′W	Beaufort Sea	Passing just west of Cross Island, Alaska, United States (at 70°30′N 147°59′W)
70°19′N 148°0′W	United States	Alaska — Mainland, Esther Island, Perry Island, the mainland again, Chenega Island, Evans Island and Latouche Island
59°57′N 148°0′W	Pacific Ocean	Passing just west of Montague Island, Alaska, United States (at 59°47′N 147°56′W); Passing just east of Tikehau atoll, French Polynesia (at 14°58′S 148°2′W); Passing just west of Rangiroa atoll, French Polynesia (at 15°4′S 147°56′W); Passing just east of Mehetia island, French Polynesia (at 17°52′S 148°3′W)
60°0′S 148°0′W	Southern Ocean	
75°57′S 148°0′W	Antarctica	Unclaimed territory

== See also ==
- 147th meridian west
- 149th meridian west
