= Nils Strindberg =

Swedish photographer and scientist (1872–1897)

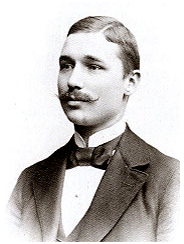
Nils Strindberg

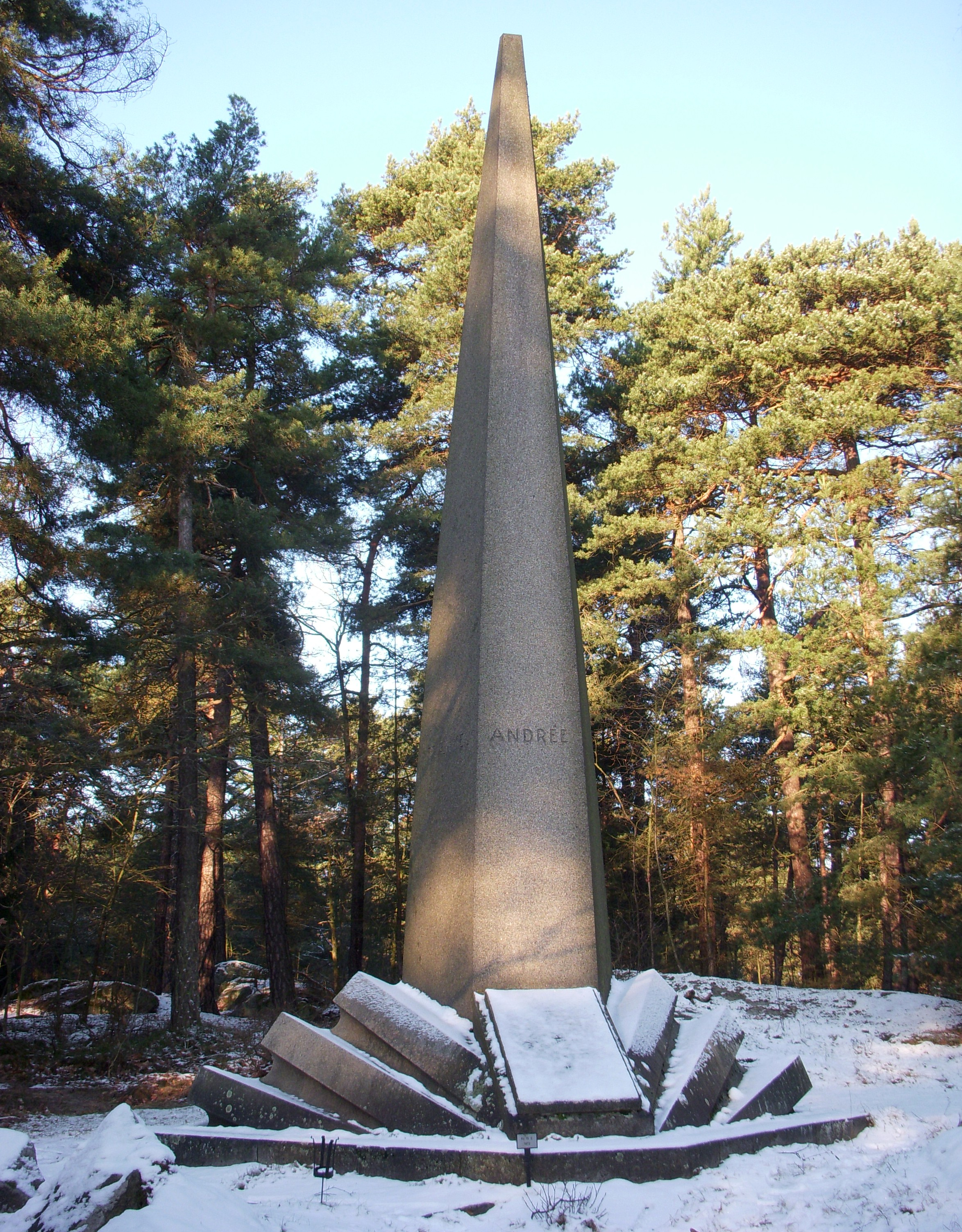
Memorial to Andrée, Strindberg and Fränkel at Norra begravningsplatsen

Nils Strindberg (4 September 1872 – October 1897) was a Swedish photographer and scientist. He was one of the three members of S. A. Andrée's ill-fated Arctic balloon expedition of 1897.

== Biography ==
Nils Strindberg was born in Stockholm, Sweden. He was the son of wholesaler Johan Oscar Strindberg and Aurora Helena Rosalie Lundgren. His younger brother, Tore Strindberg (1882–1968), was a noted sculptor. His father's cousin was playwright and novelist August Strindberg (1849–1912).

Strindberg graduated from Norra Real in Stockholm during 1890. He received his Bachelor of Arts (fil.kand.) at Uppsala University in 1893. In 1895, received a post as lector at the Stockholm University. In the spring of 1896 he traveled to Paris to study gas balloon flight.

Strindberg was invited to the Arctic balloon expedition of 1897 to create a photographic aerial record of the arctic. Before perishing on Kvitøya (White Island) with Andrée and Knut Frænkel, Strindberg recorded on film their long-doomed struggle on foot to reach populated areas. When the remains of the expedition were discovered by the Norwegian Bratvaag Expedition in 1930, five exposed rolls of film were found, one of them still in the camera. Docent John Hertzberg of the Royal Institute of Technology in Stockholm managed to save 93 of the theoretically 240 frames. A selection of these photos were published along with the diaries of the expedition as Med Örnen mot Polen (Stockholm: Bonnier (1930); British edition The Andrée diaries (1931); American edition Andrée's Story (1932). The book credited the three explorers as its authors. In an article from 2004, Tyrone Martinsson published some digitally enhanced versions of Strindberg's photos of the expedition, while lamenting the lack of care with which the original negatives were stored from 1944.

Strindberg's so-called "shorthand" diary from the expedition has the form of messages to his fiancée, Anna Charlier (1871-1949), and provides a more personal window on events than Andrée's own diaries. Strindberg's body and those of the other two explorers were brought back to Sweden for a funeral with great honors. After cremation, their ashes were interred together at the cemetery Norra begravningsplatsen in Stockholm.

== Other sources ==
- Tyrone Martinsson (2006) Nils Strindberg : en biografi om fotografen på Andrées polarexpedition (Lund : Historiska Media) ISBN 9789185057603
