= Steven Joyce =

New Zealand politician

The Honourable Steven Joyce CNZM
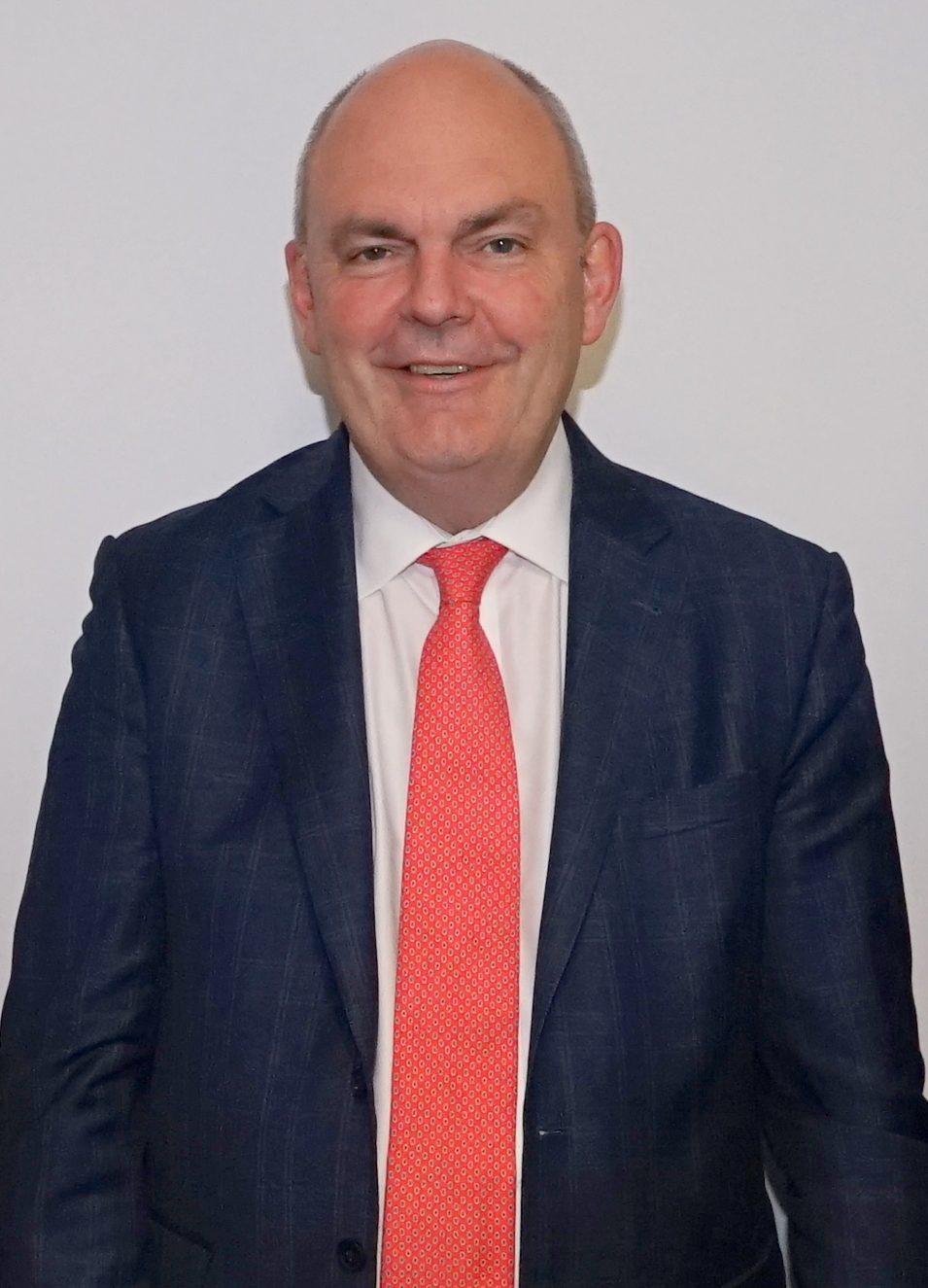
- Joyce in 2016

41st Minister of Finance
- In office 20 December 2016 – 26 October 2017
- Prime Minister: Bill English
- Preceded by: Bill English
- Succeeded by: Grant Robertson

2nd Minister for Infrastructure
- In office 20 December 2016 – 26 October 2017
- Prime Minister: Bill English
- Preceded by: Position created (last held by Bill English)
- Succeeded by: Shane Jones

5th Minister for Economic Development
- In office 14 December 2011 – 20 December 2016
- Prime Minister: John Key; Bill English
- Preceded by: Gerry Brownlee
- Succeeded by: Simon Bridges

24th Minister for Science and Innovation
- In office 14 December 2011 – 20 December 2016
- Prime Minister: John Key; Bill English
- Preceded by: Wayne Mapp
- Succeeded by: Paul Goldsmith

Minister for Tertiary Education, Skills and Employment
- In office 27 January 2010 – 20 December 2016
- Prime Minister: John Key; Bill English
- Preceded by: Anne Tolley
- Succeeded by: Paul Goldsmith

24th Minister of Transport
- In office 19 November 2008 – 14 December 2011
- Prime Minister: John Key
- Preceded by: Annette King
- Succeeded by: Gerry Brownlee

Minister for Communications and Information Technology
- In office 19 November 2008 – 14 December 2011
- Prime Minister: John Key
- Preceded by: David Cunliffe
- Succeeded by: Amy Adams

Member of the New Zealand Parliament for National party list
- In office 8 November 2008 – 2 April 2018
- Succeeded by: Nicola Willis

Personal details
- Born: 7 April 1963 (age 63) New Plymouth, Taranaki, New Zealand
- Party: National Party
- Spouse: Suzanne Joyce
- Children: 2
- Education: Massey University
- Occupation: Broadcasting entrepreneur

Steven Leonard Joyce CNZM (born 7 April 1963) is a New Zealand former politician, who entered the New Zealand House of Representatives in 2008 as a member of the New Zealand National Party. As a broadcasting entrepreneur with RadioWorks, he was a millionaire before he entered politics. In 2008 he became Minister of Transport and Minister for Communications and Information Technology. He later became Minister of Science and Innovation, and then served as Minister of Finance and Minister for Infrastructure.

On 6 March 2018, he announced his resignation from politics, after losing his bid for the leadership of the party. Joyce subsequently established a consultancy firm called Joyce Advisory, which developed close ties with the National Party. In 2023, Joyce Advisory was rumoured to have played a role in influencing the National Party's support for the University of Waikato to host New Zealand's proposed third medical school, but the university said that Joyce had not provided government relations or lobbying support. In June 2025, Joyce was appointed as the chairman of media company New Zealand Media and Entertainment, which owns The New Zealand Herald newspaper and the radio station Newstalk ZB.

== Early life ==
Joyce's parents worked as grocers. He went to school at Francis Douglas Memorial College, before enrolling at Massey University, applying to study veterinary science. However he "missed the cut", graduating instead with a BSc in zoology. While at university he worked as a presenter and programme director on Radio Massey. He also took fifteen economics papers at Massey from 1982 to 1986, withdrew or did not complete seven of them and failed one through insufficient grade.

== Broadcasting career ==
After leaving university Joyce and a group of friends (including radio presenter Jeremy Corbett) started their own radio station, Energy FM, in New Plymouth. With business partners, he built up RadioWorks over the next seventeen years, both organically and by acquisition, to a network of 22 radio stations and 650 staff. He retired as Managing Director of RadioWorks in April 2001, when CanWest purchased it, Joyce receiving $6 million for the sale.

After RadioWorks he joined the New Zealand National Party, working as their campaign manager in both the 2005 and the 2008 general elections. He was announced as a list only candidate for the party in the 2002 general election, but did not appear on the final list. He also served as CEO of Jasons Travel Media for two years until 2008.

In 2010 while Minister of Transport, Joyce admitted to two prior driving convictions, careless driving resulting in a fine in 1988, and careless driving causing injury resulting in a fine and loss of licence in 1989.

== Member of Parliament ==
New Zealand Parliament
Years	Term	Electorate	List	Party
2008–2011	49th	List	16	National
2011–2014	50th	List	13	National
2014–2017	51st	List	5	National
2017–2018	52nd	List	4	National

=== First term, 2008–2011 ===
On 8 November 2008, Joyce was elected as a list-only candidate (ranked 16th on the party list) at the 2008 election in the Fifth National Government of New Zealand of the 49th Parliament of New Zealand representing the New Zealand National Party.

As a first term member of parliament, Joyce was appointed to the office of the Minister of Transport and the office of the Communications and Information Technology. Joyce was also appointed as a member of the Executive Council and was titled as The Honourable Steven Leonard Joyce, MP. During his tenure as Minister of Transport a number of changes were introduced. In November 2009 a ban on using cellphones while driving came into effect.

In 2010, New Zealand's unique right-hand rule at intersections was reversed. The minimum driving age was also raised from 15 to 16. Both measures were subject to cabinet approval and public consultation, and eventually passed into law.

This minimum driving age proposal was criticised by the editorial board of The New Zealand Herald for being too hesitant after experts and the public had favoured raising the driving age as high as 18 and in the opinion of the newspaper, Joyce "had not shown the resolve to follow the recommendations".

He helped create Auckland Transport as a council-controlled organisation for Auckland. Joyce stated that "Auckland will need a good agency focused on delivering the projects that have been agreed by council" and noting that Council had a number of ways of ensuring that the entity was accountable.

Joyce was also appointed to the Office of Minister for Tertiary Education, Skills and Employment replacing Anne Tolley, effective 27 January 2010.

=== Second term, 2011–2014 ===
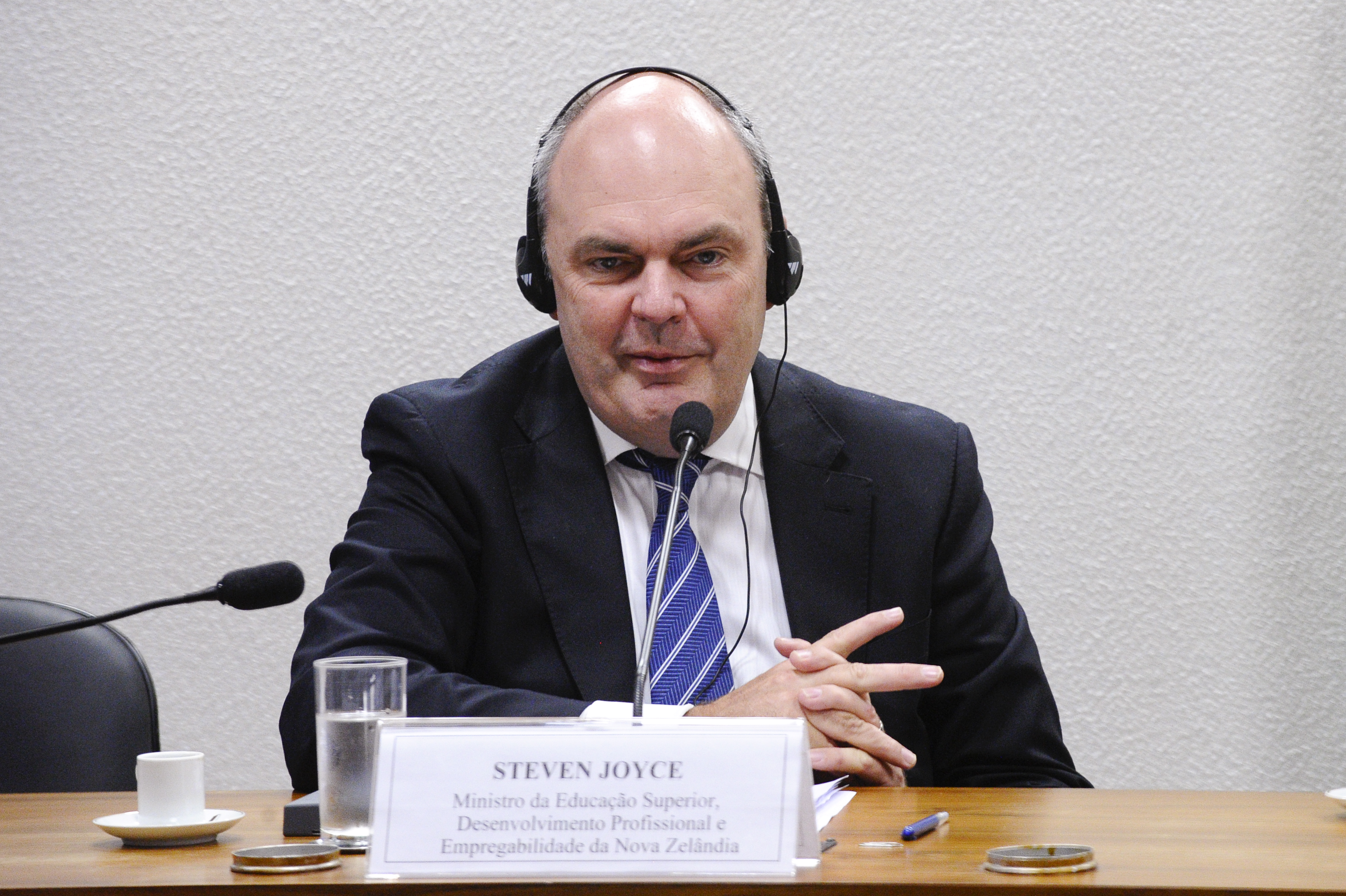
Joyce speaking in Brazil, April 2015

In the 2011 election for the 50th New Zealand Parliament Joyce retained his seat in Parliament (as a list candidate, now rated 13th on the party list) and was appointed to the office of Minister for Economic Development. in the Fifth National Government of New Zealand. His previous role as Minister of Transport passed to Gerry Brownlee.

In May 2013, he signed a deal with casino Skycity Auckland, allowing it to install an additional 230 pokie machines and 40 new gambling tables, in exchange for building a $402 million convention centre.

In August 2013, he was given responsibility to investigate both the Novopay debacle and the 2013 Fonterra recall.

=== Third term, 2014–2017 ===
In what became known as the Waitangi dildo incident, a rubber sex toy was thrown at Joyce during an anti-TPPA protest at the 2016 Waitangi Day celebrations while he was speaking to media. The protester responsible, Josie Butler, a nurse from Christchurch, shouted "That’s for raping our sovereignty". She claimed she was protesting against the TPPA. She was taken away by police, but not charged.

On 20 December 2016, Joyce was appointed as Minister of Finance and Infrastructure. During the lead-up to the 2017 general election, Joyce alleged that there was an NZ$11 billion hole in the opposition Labour Party's fiscal plan. These charges were disputed by Labour politicians including Opposition Leader Jacinda Ardern and Deputy Leader Kelvin Davis.

During the 2017 election, Joyce stood on the National Party list and was re-elected. National won 44% of the popular vote and 56 seats; maintaining its plurality in the New Zealand House of Representatives. However, National fell short of the majority needed to govern alone. Following post-election negotiations, Labour formed a coalition government with the opposition New Zealand First and Green parties.

=== In Opposition, 2017–2018 ===
Following the formation of a Labour-led coalition government, Joyce became the National Party's Spokesperson for Finance and Infrastructure. He was also allocated a seat on the Finance and Expenditure Select Committee. However, on 6 March 2018, Joyce announced he would resign from Parliament, reportedly after not being offered the Finance portfolio under new National leader Simon Bridges, who had replaced Bill English.

== Post-parliamentary life ==
=== Consultancy career ===
In 2018, Joyce established a consultancy firm called "Joyce Advisory," which specialises in business strategy development and execution, brand development and consumer preferences, reputation and crisis management, and regulatory issues. He has been retained by various businesses including property development and engineering. According to political scientist Bryce Edwards, Joyce maintains close ties with the National Party and provided advice in the area of policy development.

In June 2023, Radio New Zealand (RNZ) reported that the University of Waikato had paid nearly NZ$1 million in consultancy fees to Joyce Advisory. In July 2023, National pledged to establish a third medical school at Waikato University while campaigning for the 2023 New Zealand general election. Waikato University then hired Joyce's former press secretary and political advisor Anna Lillis to promote the school. However the university said that Joyce had no involvement in conducting government relations or lobbying work for the institution. In response, Tertiary Education Union's Waikato University organiser Shane Vugler criticised the university leadership for compromising its political independence. In early May 2024, the Auditor-General John Ryan criticised Waikato University for not engaging in a competitive procurement process when contracting the services of Joyce Advisory. The University paid NZ$1.1 million in public funds to Joyce Advisory between 2019 and 2023.

=== NZME chairman, 2025– present ===
In early May 2025, Joyce expressed interest in replacing media company NZME's chairman Barbara Chapman in anticipation of a shareholders meeting scheduled for 3 June 2025. On 3 June 2025, Joyce was appointed as NZME's chairman following a board meeting.

== Honours and awards ==
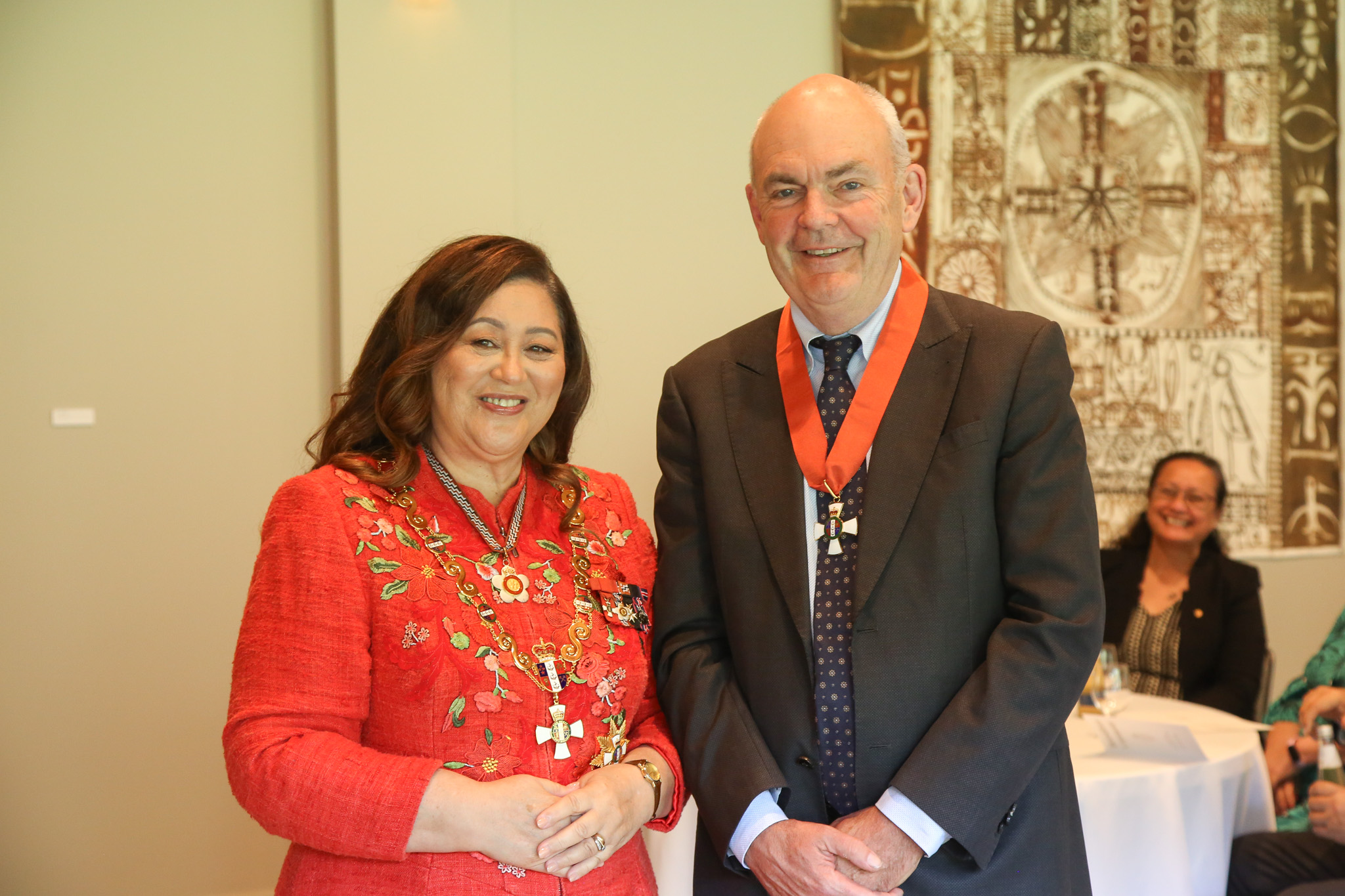
Joyce (right), after his investiture as a Companion of the New Zealand Order of Merit by the governor-general, Dame Cindy Kiro, at Government House, Auckland, on 30 September 2025

In the 2025 King’s Birthday Honours, Joyce was appointed a Companion of the New Zealand Order of Merit, for services as a Member of Parliament.

== Personal life ==
Joyce lives in Albany with his wife Suzanne; they have two children.

== References and further reading ==
- Joyce, Steven (2023). On the Record. Auckland: Allen & Unwin. ISBN 978-1-99100-646-2.

Political offices
Preceded by Annette King	Minister of Transport; 2008–2011	Succeeded by Gerry Brownlee
Preceded by David Cunliffe	Minister for Communications and Information Technology; 2008–2011	Succeeded by Amy Adams
Preceded by Anne Tolley	Minister for Tertiary Education; 2010–2011	Title abolished
New title	Minister for Tertiary Education, Skills and Employment; 2011–2016	Succeeded by Paul Goldsmith
New title	Minister for Science and Innovation; 2011–2016	Succeeded by Paul Goldsmith
Preceded by Gerry Brownlee	Minister for Economic Development; 2011–2016	Succeeded by Simon Bridges
Preceded by Bill English	Minister of Finance; 2016–2017	Succeeded by Grant Robertson
Preceded by Bill English	Minister for Infrastructure; 2016–2017	Succeeded by Shane Jones
