= Queen Victoria Sea =

Body of water in the Arctic Ocean

- Море королевы Виктории (Russian)
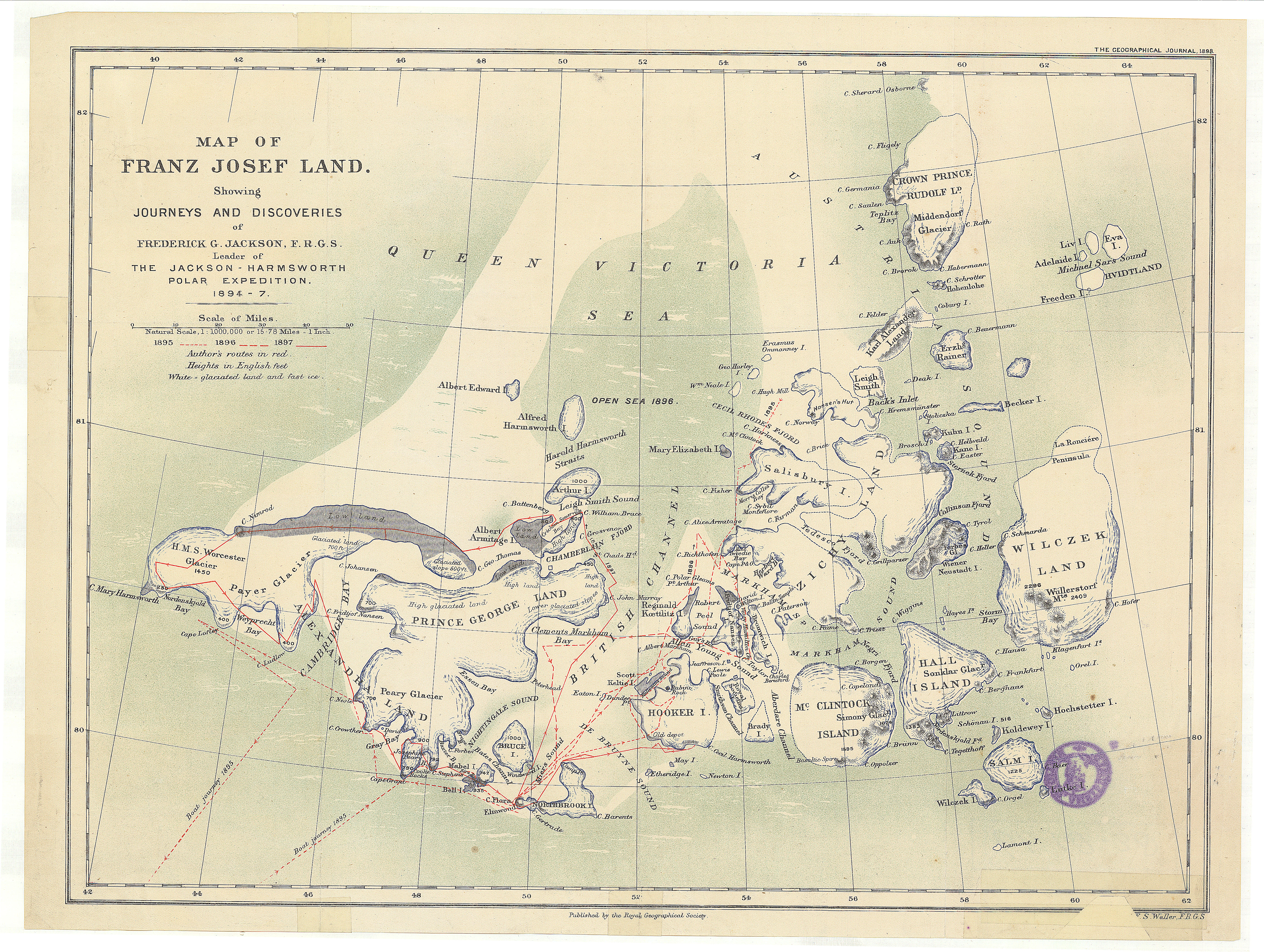
- The Queen Victoria Sea in an 1898 Franz Josef Land map showing the explorations of Frederick G. Jackson

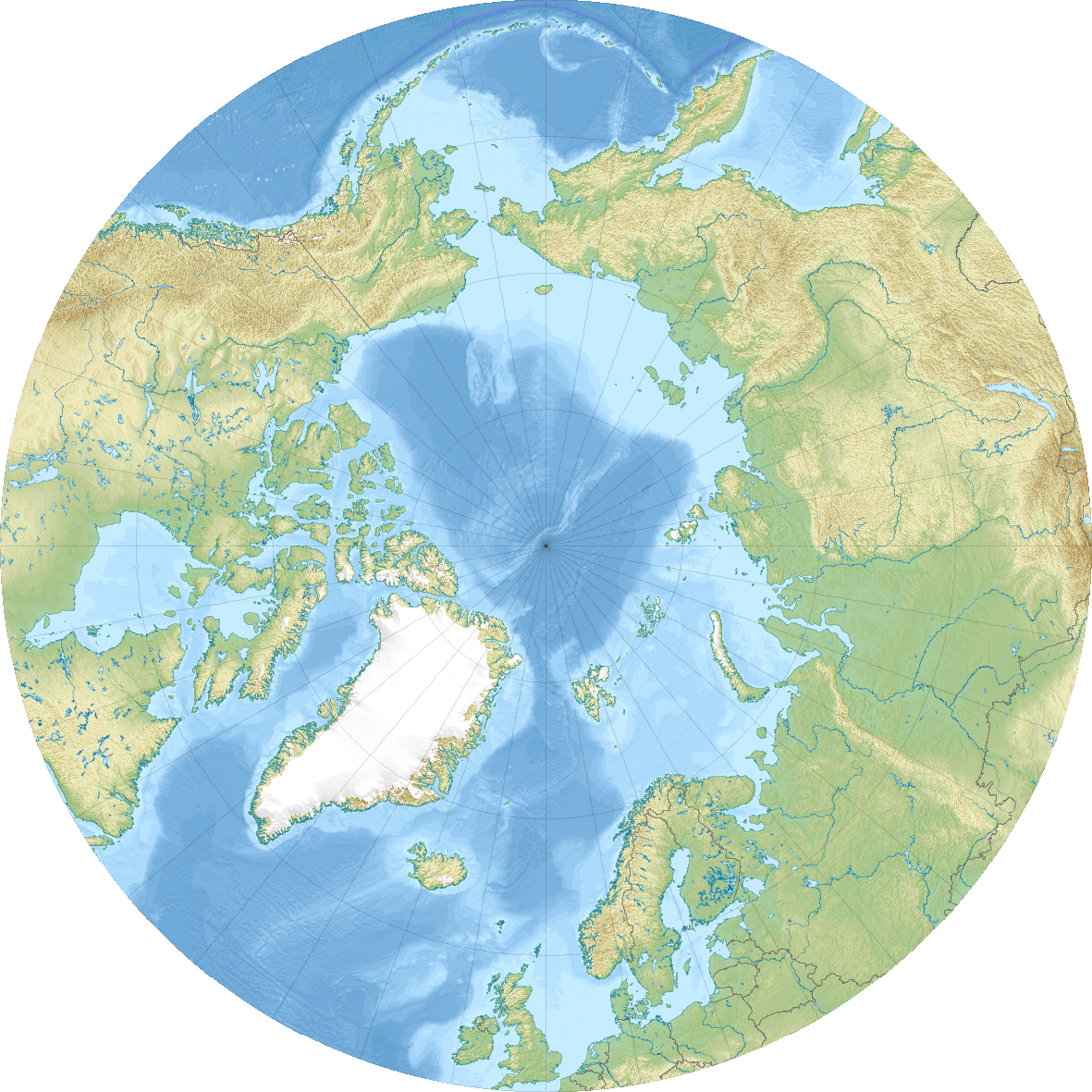
- Location within Arctic
- Location: Arctic Ocean
- Coordinates: 81°30′N 38°00′E
- Type: Sea
- Basin countries: Norway and Russia
- Max. length: 550 km (340 mi)
- Frozen: Most of the year

The Queen Victoria Sea (Russian: Море королевы Виктории, Morye Korolevy Viktorii) is a body of water in the Arctic Ocean, stretching from northeast of Svalbard to northwest Franz Josef Land. It is obstructed by ice most of the year.

This sea is named after Queen Victoria. Russian Arctic explorer Valentin Akkuratov claimed that a branch of the Gulf Stream reached as far north as the Queen Victoria Sea.

== Geography ==
The Queen Victoria Sea is located at 81° north latitude and 38° east longitude. The Arctic Ocean farther north of the sea is frozen year round. The sea stretches as far west as the Sjuøyane in Svalbard and as far east as Rudolf Island in the Franz Josef Archipelago.

The islands of Kvitøya and Victoria Island are located at the southern limit of this Arctic sea. To the south lies the Barents Sea.

== See also ==
- List of seas
