= National Topographic System =

System of geographic grid references used in Canada

The National Topographic System or NTS is the system used by Natural Resources Canada for providing general purpose topographic maps of the country. NTS maps are available in a variety of scales, the standard being 1:50,000 and 1:250,000 scales. The maps provide details on landforms and terrain, lakes and rivers, forested areas, administrative zones, populated areas, roads and railways, as well as other human-made features. These maps are currently used by all levels of government and industry for forest fire and flood control (as well as other environmental issues), depiction of crop areas, right-of-way, real estate planning, development of natural resources and highway planning. To add context, land area outside Canada is depicted on the 1:250,000 maps, but not on the 1:50,000 maps.

== History ==
Topographic mapping in Canada was originally undertaken by many different agencies, with the Canadian Army's Intelligence Branch forming a survey division to create a more standardized mapping system in 1904. The indexing system used today was established in 1923, and the map catalogue officially became the National Topographic System in 1926.

== Subdivisions ==
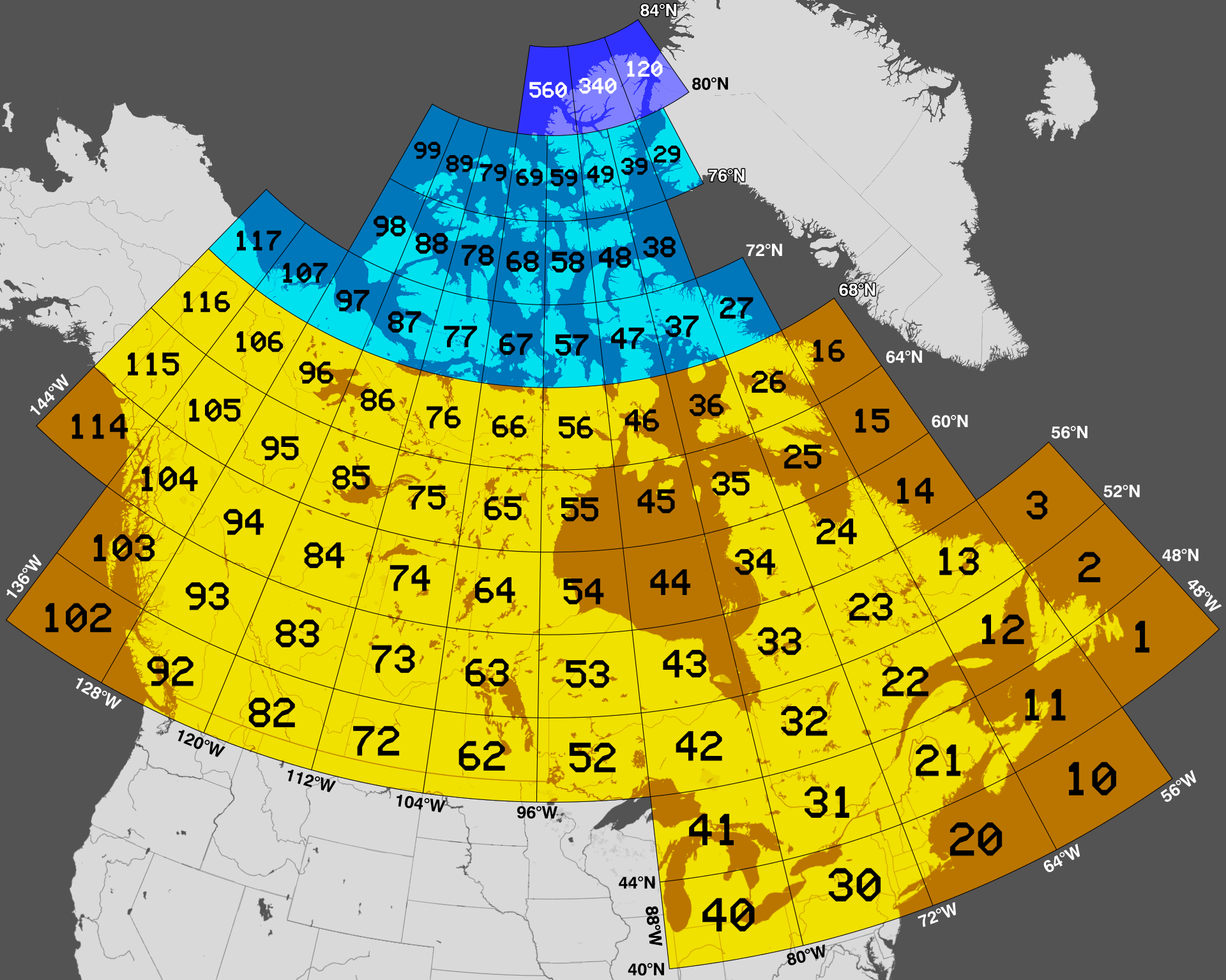
NTS zones and map series. Legend: High Arctic zone Arctic zone Southern zone

The subdivision scheme that the National Topographic System uses is known as the National Tiling System, which also functions as a coarse method of geocoding. This scheme initially splits the country into three major "zones", each spanning a different range of latitudes. The "Southern zone" covers latitudes between 40°N and 68°N, the "Arctic zone" covers latitudes between 68°N and 80°N, and the "High Arctic zone" covers latitudes between 80°N and 88°N. The National Tiling System is capable of covering all points with latitudes ranging from 40°N to 80°N and longitudes from 48°W to 144°W, as well as all points with latitudes ranging from 80°N to 88°N and longitudes from 56°W to 136°W.

Each National Tiling System zone is divided into individual 1:1,000,000 scale "map series", denoted by a number indicating its general position in the country (e.g., 30); which each map series divided into several 1:250,000 scale "map areas", denoted by a letter (e.g., M); and each map area divided into 1:50,000 scale "map sheets", denoted by a number (e.g., 13). These numbers and letters are then combined to form a unique designator for a map sheet, in this case, 30M13 Bolton, identifying a map sheet which includes the city of Vaughan, Ontario. Some map sheets are further sub-divided at their central meridian into two 1:50,000 scale "half-sheets", with an E or W appended onto the map sheet designator.

All map series span four degrees of latitude, but each spans a different range of longitudes depending on the zone it is located in. Map series in the Southern and Arctic zones span eight degrees of longitude, while those in the High Arctic zone span sixteen degrees of longitude. In the Southern and Arctic zones, the National Tiling System numbers map series by latitude and longitude. After padding a map series number to three digits using leading zeroes, the last digit in a map series number indicates a specific range of latitudes, and the number formed by the other digits indicates a specific range of longitudes. In the High Arctic zone, map series numbers are three digits, with the first two digits of each number inherited from the two map series in the Arctic zone immediately to the south.

Southern zone 1:250,000 map area lettering scheme				Arctic/High Arctic zone 1:250,000 map area lettering scheme		1:50,000 map sheet numbering			
M	N	O	P	G	H	13	14	15	16
L	K	J	I	F	E	12	11	10	9
E	F	G	H	C	D	5	6	7	8
D	C	B	A	B	A	4	3	2	1

In the Southern zone, map series are divided into sixteen map areas, each assigned a letter from A through P, while in the Arctic and High Arctic zones, they are split into eight map areas, each assigned a letter from A through H. The letters are assigned in a boustrophedon pattern starting with the southeasternmost map area in a series.

Each map area in turn is split into sixteen map sheets, numbered from 1 through 16 in an identical boustrophedon pattern to the map areas. A map sheet in the Southern zone spans half a degree of longitude, one in the Arctic zone spans a full degree, and one in the High Arctic zone spans two degrees.

Each of these 1:50,000 sheets, in turn, was at one time split into eight 1:25,000 scale map sub-sheets, lettered as lower-case a to h, using the same boustrophedon pattern as the smaller-scale map areas and sheets. These 1:25,000 scale maps were produced from the 1960s to about 1975, then abandoned, and liquidated in the 1980s (along with the scattered coverage of the 1:500,000 and 1:125,000 scale). Most were quadrangles of 7.5' by 7.5', but two unusually-shaped coverages were provided to cover Whitehorse, one being primarily 105 D/11 h but with portions of g and 105 D/10 e; the other had small portions of 105 D/14 a and b. "Military Town Plans" were also prepared on the same 1:25,000 scale, with "declassified versions" available to the public; the classified versions had places of military significance marked; these maps did not follow a quadrangle plan of any kind.

Not all National Topographic System maps strictly follow the National Tiling System's linear grid. Some maps also, as an "overedge", cover land in an area which would otherwise be covered by an adjacent map sheet, simply because the latter area does not contain enough land in Canada to warrant a separate printing. To give an example, map sheet 35D10 Smith Island is shifted to the north and east of its National Tiling System bounding area to depict the entirety of the island on a single map.

== See also ==
- International Map of the World
