= 149th meridian west =

Line of longitude

149th meridian west

The meridian 149° west of Greenwich is a line of longitude that extends from the North Pole across the Arctic Ocean, North America, the Pacific Ocean, the Southern Ocean, and Antarctica to the South Pole.

The 149th meridian west forms a great ellipse with the 31st meridian east.

== From Pole to Pole ==
Starting at the North Pole and heading south to the South Pole, the 149th meridian west passes through:

Co-ordinates	Country, territory or sea	Notes
90°0′N 149°0′W	Arctic Ocean	
72°29′N 149°0′W	Beaufort Sea	
70°26′N 149°0′W	United States	Alaska
59°57′N 149°0′W	Pacific Ocean	Passing just east of the island of Tahiti, French Polynesia (at 17°48′S 149°7′W)
60°0′S 149°0′W	Southern Ocean	
76°19′S 149°0′W	Antarctica	Unclaimed territory

== See also ==
- 148th meridian west
- 150th meridian west
