= 37th meridian west =

Line of longitude

37th meridian west

The meridian 37° west of Greenwich is a line of longitude that extends from the North Pole across the Arctic Ocean, Greenland, the Atlantic Ocean, South America, the Southern Ocean, and Antarctica to the South Pole.

The 37th meridian west forms a great circle with the 143rd meridian east.

== From Pole to Pole ==
Starting at the North Pole and heading south to the South Pole, the 37th meridian west passes through:

Co-ordinates	Country, territory or sea	Notes
90°0′N 37°0′W	Arctic Ocean	
83°27′N 37°0′W	Greenland	Roosevelt Land, Amundsen Land and the Ice sheet
65°37′N 37°0′W	Atlantic Ocean	
4°56′S 37°0′W	Brazil	Rio Grande do Norte; Paraíba — from 6°42′S 37°0′W; Pernambuco — for about 4 km from 7°28′S 37°0′W; Paraíba — from 7°30′S 37°0′W; Pernambuco — from 8°16′S 37°0′W; Alagoas — from 9°19′S 37°0′W; Sergipe — from 9°58′S 37°0′W
10°55′S 37°0′W	Atlantic Ocean	
54°3′S 37°0′W	South Georgia and the South Sandwich Islands	Island of South Georgia
54°21′S 37°0′W	Atlantic Ocean	Passing just east of Annenkov Island, South Georgia and the South Sandwich Islands (at 54°30′S 37°1′W)
60°0′S 37°0′W	Southern Ocean	
77°58′S 37°0′W	Antarctica	Claimed by both Argentina (Argentine Antarctica) and United Kingdom (British Antarctic Territory)

== See also ==
- 36th meridian west
- 38th meridian west
