= 142nd meridian west =

Line of longitude

142nd meridian west

The meridian 142° west of Greenwich is a line of longitude that extends from the North Pole across the Arctic Ocean, North America, the Pacific Ocean, the Southern Ocean, and Antarctica to the South Pole.

The 142nd meridian west forms a great circle with the 38th meridian east.

== From Pole to Pole ==
Starting at the North Pole and heading south to the South Pole, the 142nd meridian west passes through:

Co-ordinates	Country, territory or sea	Notes
90°0′N 142°0′W	Arctic Ocean	
73°31′N 142°0′W	Beaufort Sea	
69°50′N 142°0′W	United States	Alaska
60°1′N 142°0′W	Pacific Ocean	Passing just east of Takume atoll, French Polynesia (at 15°45′S 142°6′W); Passing just west of Rekareka atoll, French Polynesia (at 16°49′S 141°55′W); Passing just east of Marokau atoll, French Polynesia (at 18°1′S 142°11′W); Passing just east of Ravahere atoll, French Polynesia (at 18°16′S 142°6′W); Passing just west of Nengonengo atoll, French Polynesia (at 18°43′S 141°50′W)
60°0′S 142°0′W	Southern Ocean	
75°38′S 142°0′W	Antarctica	Unclaimed territory

== See also ==
- 141st meridian west
- 143rd meridian west
