= 141st meridian west =

Line of longitude

141st meridian west

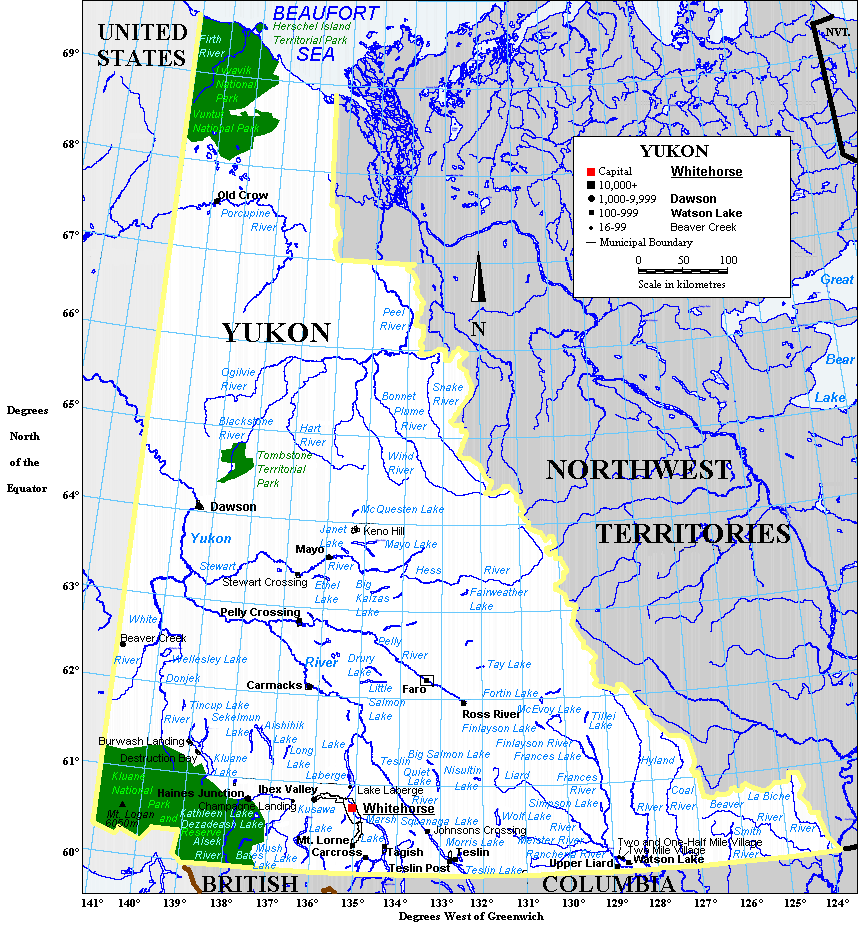
The western border of Yukon (with Alaska) is defined by the meridian.

The meridian 141° west of Greenwich is a line of longitude that extends from the North Pole across the Arctic Ocean, North America, the Pacific Ocean, the Southern Ocean, and Antarctica to the South Pole.

The 141st meridian west forms a great circle with the 39th meridian east.

Most of the border between Alaska, United States and Yukon, Canada is defined by the meridian, meaning the western extremity of Canada lies on this meridian.

== From Pole to Pole ==
Starting at the North Pole and heading south to the South Pole, the 141st meridian west passes through:

Co-ordinates	Country, territory or sea	Notes
90°0′N 141°0′W	Geographical North Pole in the Arctic Ocean	
73°40′N 141°0′W	Beaufort Sea	
69°39′N 141°0′W	United States / Canada border	Alaska / Yukon
60°19′N 141°0′W	United States	Alaska (Yakutat City and Borough)
59°46′N 141°0′W	Pacific Ocean	Passing just west of Eiao island, French Polynesia (at 8°0′S 140°43′W); Passing just east of Napuka atoll, French Polynesia (at 14°11′S 141°10′W); Passing just west of Fangatau atoll, French Polynesia (at 15°49′S 140°53′W); Passing just west of Amanu atoll, French Polynesia (at 17°51′S 140°50′W)
18°4′S 141°0′W	French Polynesia	Hao atoll
18°11′S 141°0′W	Pacific Ocean	Passing just west of Paraoa atoll, French Polynesia (at 19°7′S 140°43′W); Passing just east of Manuhangi atoll, French Polynesia (at 19°12′S 141°13′W)
60°0′S 141°0′W	Southern Ocean	
75°35′S 141°0′W	Antarctica	Unclaimed territory

== See also ==
- 140th meridian west
- 142nd meridian west
