= Esther Island (Alaska) =

Island in the Prince William Sound, Alaska

Coordinates: 60°50′42″N 148°02′01″W

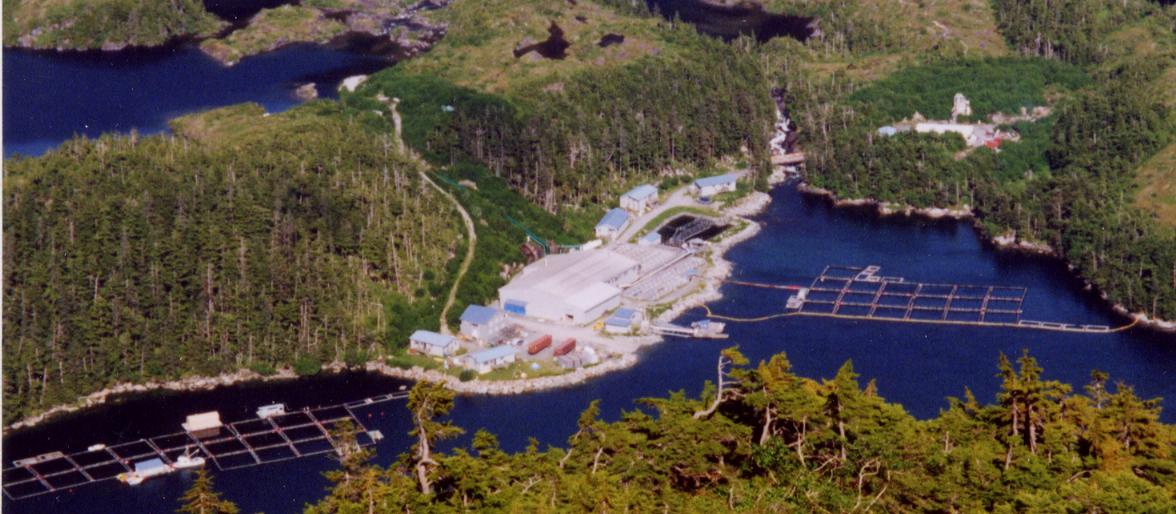
Fish hatchery on the island

Esther Island is an island in the northwestern part of Prince William Sound on the south-central coast of the state of Alaska in the United States. It has a land area of 127.336 km^{2} (49.165 sq mi) and a resident population of 31 persons as of the 2000 census. The island is the site of the South Esther Island State Marine Park, a part of the Alaska State Parks system. The island is only accessible by floatplane or boat and has no permanent settlements other than the Wally Noerenberg Hatchery, one of the world's largest salmon hatcheries, owned and operated by the Prince William Sound Aquaculture Corporation (PWSAC). The hatchery raises three different species of salmon (pink salmon, chum salmon, and coho salmon) and is located within the state marine park.
