= 36th meridian west =

Line of longitude

36th meridian west

The meridian 36° west of Greenwich is a line of longitude that extends from the North Pole across the Arctic Ocean, Greenland, the Atlantic Ocean, South America, the Southern Ocean, and Antarctica to the South Pole.

The 36th meridian west forms a great circle with the 144th meridian east.

== From Pole to Pole ==
Starting at the North Pole and heading south to the South Pole, the 36th meridian west passes through:

| Co-ordinates | Country, territory or sea | Notes |
|---|---|---|
| 90°0′N 36°0′W | Arctic Ocean | |
| 83°33′N 36°0′W | Greenland | Gertrud Rask Land |
| 65°59′N 36°0′W | Atlantic Ocean | |
| 5°3′S 36°0′W | Brazil | Rio Grande do Norte; Paraíba — from 6°27′S 36°0′W; Pernambuco — from 7°49′S 36°0′W; Alagoas — from 8°54′S 36°0′W |
| 10°0′S 36°0′W | Atlantic Ocean | |
| 54°34′S 36°0′W | South Georgia and the South Sandwich Islands | Island of South Georgia |
| 54°52′S 36°0′W | Atlantic Ocean | |
| 60°0′S 36°0′W | Southern Ocean | |
| 77°57′S 36°0′W | Antarctica | Claimed by both Argentina (Argentine Antarctica) and United Kingdom (British Antarctic Territory) |

== See also ==
- 35th meridian west
- 37th meridian west
