= 147th meridian west =

Line of longitude

147th meridian west

The meridian 147° west of Greenwich is a line of longitude that extends from the North Pole across the Arctic Ocean, North America, the Pacific Ocean, the Southern Ocean, and Antarctica to the South Pole.

The 147th meridian west forms a great circle with the 33rd meridian east.

== From Pole to Pole ==
Starting at the North Pole and heading south to the South Pole, the 147th meridian west passes through:

Co-ordinates	Country, territory or sea	Notes
90°0′N 147°0′W	Arctic Ocean	
72°47′N 147°0′W	Beaufort Sea	
70°18′N 147°0′W	United States	Alaska — the Stockton Islands
70°17′N 147°0′W	Beaufort Sea	
70°9′N 147°0′W	United States	Alaska
60°56′N 147°0′W	Prince William Sound	Passing just east of Glacier Island, Alaska, United States (at 60°53′N 147°5′W)
60°18′N 147°0′W	United States	Alaska — Montague Island
60°15′N 147°0′W	Pacific Ocean	Passing just west of Arutua atoll, French Polynesia (at 15°17′S 146°53′W); Passing just west of Kaukura atoll, French Polynesia (at 15°39′S 146°53′W)
60°0′S 147°0′W	Southern Ocean	
76°0′S 147°0′W	Antarctica	Unclaimed territory

== See also ==
- 146th meridian west
- 148th meridian west
