= 143rd Division (2nd Formation) (People's Republic of China) =

143rd Division (1951–52)
- Active: 1951.3 - 1952.12
- Country: People's Republic of China
- Branch: People's Liberation Army
- Type: Division
- Role: Infantry
- Part of: 48th Corps
- Engagements: Chinese Civil War

The 143rd Division (Chinese: 第143师)(2nd formation) was formed in March 1951 in Hunan.

The division was part of the 48th Corps.

In March 1952, the division was detached from the corps and transferred to Zhongnan Military Region's control.

In December 1952 the division was inactivated and converted to the 28th Aviation Division.

As of inactivation the division was composed of:

- The 427th Regiment;
- The 428th Regiment;
- The 429th Regiment.
