= 144th meridian east =

Line of longitude

144th meridian east (interactive map)

The meridian 144° east of Greenwich is a line of longitude that extends from the North Pole across the Arctic Ocean, Asia, the Pacific Ocean, Australasia, the Indian Ocean, the Southern Ocean, and Antarctica to the South Pole.

The 144th meridian east forms a great circle with the 36th meridian west.

== From Pole to Pole ==
Starting at the North Pole and heading south to the South Pole, the 144th meridian east passes through:

Co-ordinates	Country, territory or sea	Notes
90°0′N 144°0′E	Arctic Ocean	
75°49′N 144°0′E	Russia	Sakha Republic — Kotelny Island, New Siberian Islands
75°1′N 144°0′E	East Siberian Sea	
72°40′N 144°0′E	Russia	Sakha Republic; Khabarovsk Krai — from 61°45′N 144°0′E
59°24′N 144°0′E	Sea of Okhotsk	
49°57′N 144°0′E	Russia	Sakhalin Oblast — island of Sakhalin
49°16′N 144°0′E	Sea of Okhotsk	
44°8′N 144°0′E	Japan	Hokkaidō Prefecture — island of Hokkaidō
42°55′N 144°0′E	Pacific Ocean	Passing just east of Woleai atoll, Federated States of Micronesia (at 7°20′N 144°0′E); Passing just west of the Ninigo Islands, Papua New Guinea (at 1°28′S 144°1′E); Passing just west of the Schouten Islands, Papua New Guinea (at 3°12′S 144°3′E)
3°48′S 144°0′E	Papua New Guinea	
7°44′S 144°0′E	Coral Sea	Passing just west of Murray Island, Queensland, Australia (at 9°55′S 144°2′E)
14°29′S 144°0′E	Australia	Queensland; New South Wales — from 29°0′S 144°0′E; Victoria — from 35°33′S 144°0′E
38°31′S 144°0′E	Bass Strait	
39°36′S 144°0′E	Australia	Tasmania — King Island
40°6′S 144°0′E	Indian Ocean	Australian authorities consider this to be part of the Southern Ocean
60°0′S 144°0′E	Southern Ocean	
67°5′S 144°0′E	Antarctica	Australian Antarctic Territory, claimed by Australia

== See also ==
- 143rd meridian east
- 145th meridian east
