= 37th meridian east =

Line of longitude

37th meridian east

The meridian 37° east of Greenwich is a line of longitude that extends from the North Pole across the Arctic Ocean, Europe, Asia, Africa, the Indian Ocean, the Southern Ocean, and Antarctica to the South Pole.

The 37th meridian east forms a great circle with the 143rd meridian west.

== From Pole to Pole ==
Starting at the North Pole and heading south to the South Pole, the 37th meridian east passes through:

Co-ordinates	Country, territory or sea	Notes
90°0′N 37°0′E	Arctic Ocean	
80°21′N 37°0′E	Barents Sea	Passing just east of Victoria Island, Russia
68°53′N 37°0′E	Russia	Kola Peninsula
66°15′N 37°0′E	White Sea	
65°10′N 37°0′E	Russia	Onega Peninsula
64°29′N 37°0′E	White Sea	Onega Bay
63°53′N 37°0′E	Russia	
50°21′N 37°0′E	Ukraine	
46°52′N 37°0′E	Sea of Azov	
45°23′N 37°0′E	Russia	Taman Peninsula
45°4′N 37°0′E	Black Sea	
41°17′N 37°0′E	Turkey	
36°45′N 37°0′E	Syria	
32°25′N 37°0′E	Jordan	
29°54′N 37°0′E	Saudi Arabia	
25°24′N 37°0′E	Red Sea	
21°26′N 37°0′E	Sudan	
17°0′N 37°0′E	Eritrea	For about 6km
16°56′N 37°0′E	Sudan	For about 19km
16°46′N 37°0′E	Eritrea	
14°15′N 37°0′E	Ethiopia	
4°23′N 37°0′E	Kenya	
2°40′S 37°0′E	Tanzania	
11°36′S 37°0′E	Mozambique	
18°0′S 37°0′E	Indian Ocean	
60°0′S 37°0′E	Southern Ocean	
69°38′S 37°0′E	Antarctica	Queen Maud Land, claimed by Norway

== See also ==
- 36th meridian east
- 38th meridian east
