= 146th meridian west =

Line of longitude

146th meridian west (interactive map)

The meridian 146° west of Greenwich is a line of longitude that extends from the North Pole across the Arctic Ocean, North America, the Pacific Ocean, the Southern Ocean, and Antarctica to the South Pole.

The 146th meridian west forms a great circle with the 34th meridian east.

== From Pole to Pole ==
Starting at the North Pole and heading south to the South Pole, the 146th meridian west passes through:

Co-ordinates	Country, territory or sea	Notes
90°0′N 146°0′W	Arctic Ocean	
72°56′N 146°0′W	Beaufort Sea	
70°12′N 146°0′W	United States	Alaska — Flaxman Island, the mainland and Hawkins Island
60°30′N 146°0′W	Pacific Ocean	Passing just east of Hinchinbrook Island, Alaska, United States (at 60°24′N 146°4′W)
14°23′S 146°0′W	French Polynesia	Manihi atoll
14°27′S 146°0′W	Pacific Ocean	Passing just east of Apataki atoll, French Polynesia (at 15°20′S 146°11′W)
15°48′S 146°0′W	French Polynesia	Toau atoll
16°0′S 146°0′W	Pacific Ocean	Passing just west of Fakarava atoll, French Polynesia (at 16°8′S 145°49′W)
60°0′S 146°0′W	Southern Ocean	
75°38′S 146°0′W	Antarctica	Unclaimed territory

== See also ==
- 145th meridian west
- 147th meridian west
