= 145th meridian east =

Line of longitude

145th meridian east (interactive map)

The meridian 145° east of Greenwich is a line of longitude that extends from the North Pole across the Arctic Ocean, Asia, the Pacific Ocean, Australasia, the Indian Ocean, the Southern Ocean, and Antarctica to the South Pole.

The 145th meridian east forms a great circle with the 35th meridian west.

== From Pole to Pole ==
Starting at the North Pole and heading south to the South Pole, the 145th meridian east passes through:

Co-ordinates	Country, territory or sea	Notes
90°0′N 145°0′E	Arctic Ocean	
75°37′N 145°0′E	Russia	Sakha Republic — Kotelny Island, New Siberian Islands
75°27′N 145°0′E	East Siberian Sea	
72°35′N 145°0′E	Russia	Sakha Republic; Magadan Oblast — from 62°14′N 145°0′E; Khabarovsk Krai — from 62°1′N 145°0′E
59°22′N 145°0′E	Sea of Okhotsk	Passing just east of the island of Sakhalin, Sakhalin Oblast, Russia (at 48°39′N 144°45′E)
44°4′N 145°0′E	Japan	Hokkaidō Prefecture — island of Hokkaidō
42°59′N 145°0′E	Pacific Ocean	Passing just east of Farallon de Pajaros island, Northern Mariana Islands (at 20°32′N 144°54′E); Passing just west of Rota island, Northern Mariana Islands (at 14°7′N 145°7′E); Passing just east of Guam (at 13°35′N 144°57′E); Passing just west of the Hermit Islands, Papua New Guinea (at 1°33′S 145°1′E) and into the Bismarck Sea
4°3′S 145°0′E	Papua New Guinea	Island of Manam
4°7′S 145°0′E	Pacific Ocean	Bismarck Sea
4°19′S 145°0′E	Papua New Guinea	
7°49′S 145°0′E	Coral Sea	Passing just east of Howick Island, Queensland, Australia (at 14°30′S 144°59′E)
14°45′S 145°0′E	Australia	Queensland; New South Wales — from 29°0′S 145°0′E; Victoria — from 35°51′S 145°0′E, passing through Melbourne (at 37°50′S 144°55′E)
37°57′S 145°0′E	Port Phillip Bay	
38°16′S 145°0′E	Australia	Victoria — Mornington Peninsula
38°29′S 145°0′E	Bass Strait	Passing just east of Three Hummock Island, Tasmania, Australia (at 40°25′S 144°58′E)
40°41′S 145°0′E	Australia	Tasmania — Robbins Island and the Tasmanian mainland
41°46′S 145°0′E	Indian Ocean	Australian authorities consider this to be part of the Southern Ocean
60°0′S 145°0′E	Southern Ocean	
67°0′S 145°0′E	Antarctica	Australian Antarctic Territory, claimed by Australia

== See also ==
- 144th meridian east
- 146th meridian east
