= 39th meridian east =

Line of longitude

39th meridian east

The meridian 39° east of Greenwich is a line of longitude that extends from the North Pole across the Arctic Ocean, Europe, Asia, Africa, the Indian Ocean, the Southern Ocean, and Antarctica to the South Pole.

The 39th meridian east forms a great circle with the 141st meridian west.

== From Pole to Pole ==
Starting at the North Pole and heading south to the South Pole, the 39th meridian east passes through:

Co-ordinates	Country, territory or sea	Notes
90°0′N 39°0′E	Arctic Ocean	
80°23′N 39°0′E	Barents Sea	
68°33′N 39°0′E	Russia	Kola Peninsula
68°6′N 39°0′E	White Sea	
64°43′N 39°0′E	Russia	
49°48′N 39°0′E	Ukraine	
47°52′N 39°0′E	Russia	
47°16′N 39°0′E	Sea of Azov	Taganrog Bay
46°59′N 39°0′E	Russia	Passing just east of Krasnodar (at 45°2′N 38°58′E)
44°9′N 39°0′E	Black Sea	
41°2′N 39°0′E	Turkey	
36°42′N 39°0′E	Syria	
33°28′N 39°0′E	Iraq	
33°9′N 39°0′E	Jordan	
32°0′N 39°0′E	Saudi Arabia	
22°42′N 39°0′E	Red Sea	
21°59′N 39°0′E	Saudi Arabia	
21°50′N 39°0′E	Red Sea	
17°7′N 39°0′E	Eritrea	Passing just east of Asmara
14°35′N 39°0′E	Ethiopia	
3°32′N 39°0′E	Kenya	
4°31′S 39°0′E	Tanzania	
5°27′S 39°0′E	Zanzibar Channel	Between the Tanzania mainland, and the island of Zanzibar
6°27′S 39°0′E	Tanzania	
11°10′S 39°0′E	Mozambique	
17°0′S 39°0′E	Indian Ocean	
60°0′S 39°0′E	Southern Ocean	
69°55′S 39°0′E	Antarctica	Queen Maud Land, claimed by Norway

== See also ==
- 38th meridian east
- 40th meridian east
