= Jasons Travel Media =

Jasons
- Website type: Travel guide
- Available in: English
- Owner: iTAG
- Website: www.jasons.com
- Commercial: Yes
- Registration: No
- Launched: June 1996; 30 years ago

Jasons is a publisher of travel guides and an online directory of activities and lodging in New Zealand, Australia, and the South Pacific. Jasons produces 62 free travel guides annually.

== History ==
The company was started as a family business in 1967 by John Sanford.

In 1996, the company launched a website.

Jason Publishing Co Ltd was renamed to Jasons Travel Media in 2000.

In 2005, it became a public company via an initial public offering on the New Zealand Stock Exchange.

In August 2006, Steven Joyce, later Minister of Economic Development, Minister of Science and Innovation, Minister for Tertiary Education, Skills and Employment and Associate Minister of Finance in New Zealand, became chief executive officer of the company after he acquired an 8.8% stake.

In 2008, the company acquired Strait Solutions; the Today-Tonight visitor guide print publications in Christchurch and Queenstown; and the brochure distribution services and two visitor guides of Whytewaters in Queenstown.

In late 2011 and early 2012, mobile apps were launched for iOS.

In December 2013, the company was acquired by Bennetts Group for $928,000 after it was placed in receivership.

In 2015, it was acquired by iTAG.
