= 143rd Division (1st Formation) (People's Republic of China) =

143rd Division (1948–50)
- Active: 1948.11 - 1950.11
- Country: People's Republic of China
- Branch: People's Liberation Army
- Type: Division
- Role: Infantry
- Part of: 48th Corps
- Engagements: Chinese Civil War

The 143rd Division (Chinese: 第143师) was created in November 1948 under the Regulation of the Redesignations of All Organizations and Units of the Army, issued by Central Military Commission on November 1, 1948, basing on the 32nd Division, 11th Column of the PLA Dongbei Field Army. Its origin can be traced to 5th Independent Brigade of Jicha Military Region, formed in September 1945.

On May 18, 1948, a soldier of the division, Dong Cunrui, sacrificed himself while destroying a Kuomintang bunker guarding an approach to an important bridge in Longhua County.

The division is part of 48th Corps. Under the flag of 143rd division it took part in several major battles during the Chinese Civil War.

In November 1950 the division was inactivated and converted to 21st Artillery Division.

As of inactivation the division was composed of:

- 427th Regiment;
- 428th Regiment;
- 429th Regiment.
