= 145th Division (2nd Formation) (People's Republic of China) =

145th Army Division (1969-78)
- Active: 1969.11 - 1978.12
- Country: People's Republic of China
- Branch: People's Liberation Army
- Type: Division
- Role: Infantry
- Part of: Hunan Provincial Military District
- Garrison/HQ: Yuanjiang, Hunan

The 145th Army Division (Chinese: 陆军第145师)(2nd Formation) was formed in November 1969 from detachments of the 47th Army Corps. The division was under direct control of Guangzhou Military Region, while under administrative control from 47th Army Corps.

The division stationed in Yuanjiang, Hunan for agricultural production mission.

In 1970 the division was transferred to Hunan Provincial Military District's control. The division was then composed of:

- 433rd Infantry Regiment;
- 434th Infantry Regiment;
- 435th Infantry Regiment;
- Artillery Regiment.

The division was reduced in March 1975 and disbanded in December 1978.
