= Bratvaag Expedition =

Norwegian expedition in the Svalbard Arctic region

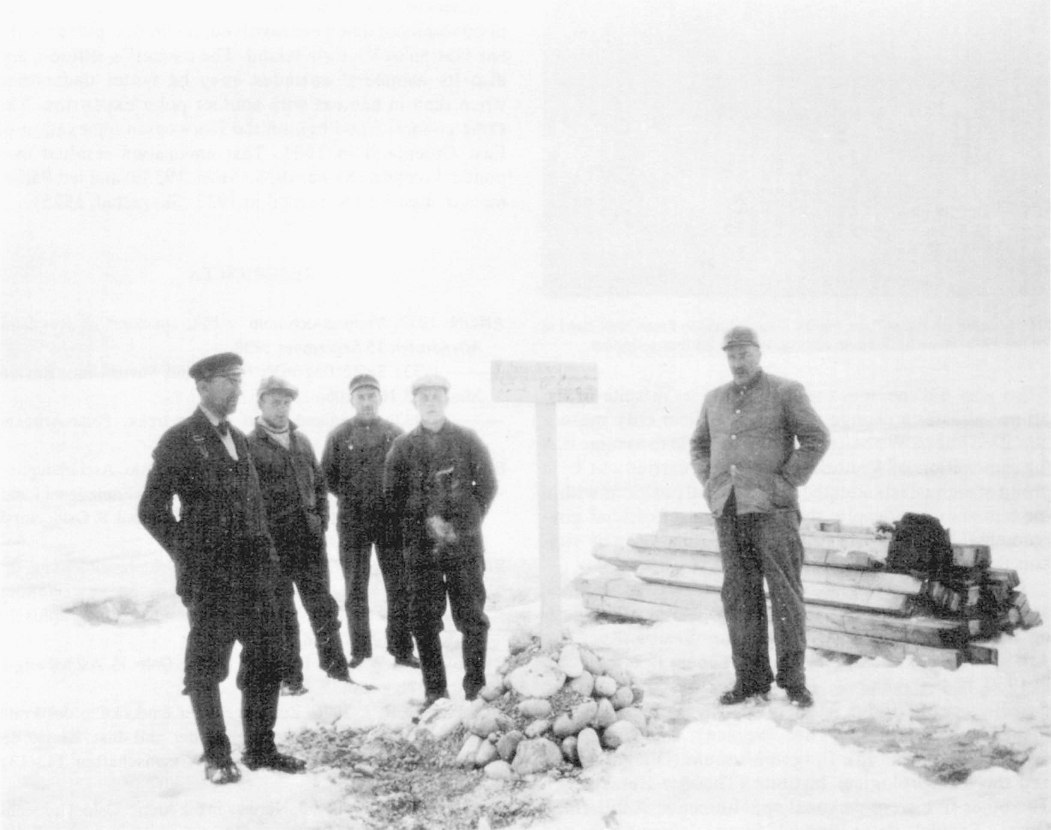
Picture by Gunnar Horn of the Victoria Island landing team on 8 August 1930.

The Bratvaag Expedition was a Norwegian expedition in 1930 led by Dr. Gunnar Horn, whose official tasks were hunting seals and to study glaciers and seas in the Svalbard Arctic region. The name of the expedition was taken from its ship, M/S Bratvaag of Ålesund, in which captain Peder Eliassen had sailed the Arctic seas for more than twenty years. The Bratvaag Expedition had a secret, but important mission: the annexation of Victoria Island for Norway. Although a successful landing on the island was achieved, Victoria Island was later annexed by the Soviet Union. The Bratvaag Expedition became nevertheless well known due to the findings on Kvitøya of the long-lost remains of the Swedish explorer S. A. Andrée's Arctic balloon expedition of 1897.

== Background ==
Victoria Island was discovered on 20 July 1898 by two Norwegian sealing captains, Johannes Nilsen and Ludvig Bernard Sebulonsen. The next day, captain P. W. Nilsen of the steam yacht Victoria, owned by the English adventurer Arnold Pike, sighted the island and named it after the yacht.

According to the Spitsbergen Treaty, Norway was ceded the sovereignty of the Svalbard Archipelago in 1920, comprising all the islands situated between 10° and 35°E and 74° and 81°N. Although Victoria Island is situated only less than 35 nautical miles (c. 62 km) off the Norwegian island of Kvitøya (White Island), it lies east of the Norwegian territories. Consequently, the island was considered Terra nullius, until a Soviet decree in 1926 that claimed a Soviet sector in the Arctic region that also included Franz Josef Land and Victoria Island.

After a failed attempt on Franz Josef Land and the landing of a Soviet expedition there in 1929, the Norwegian efforts were concentrated on securing Victoria Island for Norway. The ship M/S Bratvaag with its mixed crew of sealers and scientists headed for the Arctic Sea in the summer of 1930, with the purpose of claiming Victoria Island in the name of the ship's owner Harald M. Leite.

== Finding of the remains of S. A. Andrée's expedition ==
White Island was typically inaccessible to sealers and whalers since it usually was surrounded by a wide belt of thick polar pack ice. It also was often hidden from view by thick ice fogs. It was known, however, to be prime hunting ground for walrus. It had been an exceptionally warm year in 1930 and the sea was virtually free of ice. The fog was light that afternoon, so some of the men decided to approach White Island to hunt walrus and to do a little scientific exploring. The sealers went ashore and began the hunt for walrus. During the stay two of the hunters, Olav Salen and Karl Tusvik, discovered a bit of metal sticking out of the snow. When they approached they saw it was part of a boat sticking out of the ground. In the boat was a lot of equipment frozen in ice, including a boatswain's hook with the words "Andrée's Polar Expedition, 1896" engraved upon the visible portion. At that point captain Eliassen came to the island and it was decided to investigate further; the scientists were invited to join them.

The find lay on the north west side of a rocky hill and one of the first things found was the partial skeleton of a man, half buried in the snow and ice. The skeleton had been disturbed by bears, and much of the upper part of the body was missing, but a monogram on the jacket identified the body as being that of Andrée. A number of instruments and other artifacts were found, including a diary, but the pages of the diary were sealed together by glue which had dissolved and re-frozen over the entire booklet and could not be opened. Nearby was the boat half buried on its side in ice and half filled with ice. When Eliassen and the scientists looked through the ice, they saw clothing, equipment, a furled Swedish flag and bones.

Several yards from the camp, one of the men found what appeared to be a grave with a skull lying loose on the rocks. It was assumed that the person had been buried under a cairn of rocks but the grave had been disturbed by animals. From this tomb, the searchers were able to retrieve much of the skeleton. It was probably the grave of Andrée's companion, photographer Nils Strindberg because of initials on his clothing.

The group decided they must take as much of the find as possible aboard the Bratvaag to ensure proper burial of the bodies and to allow scientists to examine the artifacts and determine their authenticity. They felt they could not leave the materials in place as the weather and animals might further destroy the find. In addition, they knew it might be years before another group could land on White Island. In a packet of books near one end of the boat, Eliassen found the expedition's observation book which he was able to open somewhat. The captain believed this book had been written by Strindberg, the scientific member of the expedition. The flyleaf of the book was inscribed: "The Sledge Journey, 1897" indicating that the journal was written after the group had left the balloon.

As a final gesture, the group erected a memorial cairn on the hill where they had located the body of Andrée. In the cairn they put a bottle with a note: "In this place, the Norwegian Expedition to Franz Josef Land found the relics of the Swedish Andrée Expedition. White Island, 6 August 1930, Gunnar Horn."

On 8 August they met with a sealer out of Tromsø, returning home and agreed to send a message to the Norwegian authorities of the find, since the Bratvaag crew and scientists wished to finish their hunting and scientific work before returning to harbor.

== The landing on Victoria Island ==
The expedition continued eastwards and they arrived at Victoria Island on 8 August 1930. At 04:30 a group of seven men went ashore: Horn and Eliassen, botanist Olaf Hanssen, zoologist Adolf Sørensen, Bjarne Ekornåsvåg, and the two trappers Lars Tusvik and Syver Alvestad. They landed on a beach situated on the north-western side, the only place possible to get ashore. The beach was snow-covered and no sign of any other claim to the island was seen. Horn therefore decided to claim the island and raised a sign on the beach, stating: "Victoria Island claimed for Harald M. Leite, Ålesund, Norway. 8 August 1930, G. Horn."

Next to the claim sign, building materials, nails and a hammer were placed. They were sufficient to build a 2 x 3 m cabin, but it was not possible to secure the cabin against a storm, so it was not erected. The landing party left the island at 07:55 and Bratvaag headed for Franz Josef Land. There they continued their scientific investigation and hunting, as well as building a cabin at Cape Forbes, Zemlja Georga, in which they left provisions.

== Aftermath ==
On 30 August they were near enough to civilization that they were able to hear on their wireless radio that the world was anxiously waiting for them to come home and that many vessels containing members of the press were vying to be the first to board the boat. They were given governmental orders to proceed to Tromsø. On 2 September they were met there by scientists charged by the Swedish and Norwegian governments to take possession of, and preserve, the find. The remains of Andrée and his colleagues were carried to the Tromsø Coast Hospital for study and preparation for burial. They were later brought to their homeland Sweden, where the return of the bodies was grandly celebrated including a speech by the king Gustaf V, and they were buried with great honors. Andrée is interred together with Nils Strindberg and Knut Frænkel at the cemetery Norra begravningsplatsen in Stockholm.

The recovered artifacts provided vital information about the fate of the Andrée expedition that for 33 years had remained one of the unsolved riddles of the Arctic. The chance discovery in 1930 of the expedition's last camp created a media sensation in Sweden, where the dead men were mourned and idolized.

Despite the efforts done with the Bratvaag Expedition at Victoria Island, Norway never officially claimed the island later, probably due to fear of upsetting the Soviet Union. In September 1932 it became known that the Soviet Union had annexed the island.

== Sources ==
- I. Gjertz, B. Mørkved, "Norwegian Arctic Expansionism, Victoria Island (Russia) and the Bratvaag Expedition", Arctic, Vol. 51, No. 4 (December 1998), P. 330-335 (Available as PDF)
- The End of a Voyage - The Bratvaag Find
