= 145th Street =

145th Street may refer to:

== New York ==
- 145th Street (Manhattan), a street in Manhattan, New York City
- 145th Street (IRT Broadway – Seventh Avenue Line), a station at Broadway serving the 1 train
- 145th Street (IND Eighth Avenue Line), a station at Saint Nicholas Avenue serving the A, B, C, and D trains
- 145th Street (IRT Lenox Avenue Line), a station at Lenox Avenue serving the 3 train
- 145th Street (IRT Ninth Avenue Line), a demolished Interborough Rapid Transit Company station
- 145th Street Bridge, a bridge over the Harlem River
- 145th Street Shuttle, a former service of the Interborough Rapid Transit Company and New York City Subway

== Washington ==
- Washington State Route 523, which is named 145th Street, and forms part of the northern border of Seattle
  - Shoreline South/148th station, a light rail station in Shoreline, Washington
