= 143rd Division (3rd Formation) (People's Republic of China) =

143rd Army Division (1967–85)
- Active: November 1969 – November 1978
- Country: People's Republic of China
- Branch: People's Liberation Army
- Type: Division
- Role: Infantry
- Part of: Guangzhou Military Region
- Garrison/HQ: Taishan, Guangdong province

The 143rd Army Division (Chinese: 陆军第143师)(3rd Formation) was formed in November 1969. As of December 1969 the division was composed of:

- 427th Infantry Regiment;
- 428th Infantry Regiment;
- 429th Infantry Regiment;
- Artillery Regiment.

The division belonged to Guangzhou Military Region, while under the command of 42nd Army Corps. It stationed in Taishan, Guangdong for agricultural production mission.

In November 1978 the division was disbanded.
