= 144th meridian west =

Line of longitude

144th meridian west

The meridian 144° west of Greenwich is a line of longitude that extends from the North Pole across the Arctic Ocean, North America, the Pacific Ocean, the Southern Ocean, and Antarctica to the South Pole.

The 144th meridian west forms a great circle with the 36th meridian east.

The 144th meridian west is the western edge of the grid indexing scheme for Canada's National Topographic System.

== From Pole to Pole ==
Starting at the North Pole and heading south to the South Pole, the 144th meridian west passes through:

Co-ordinates	Country, territory or sea	Notes
90°0′N 144°0′W	Arctic Ocean	
73°13′N 144°0′W	Beaufort Sea	
70°6′N 144°0′W	United States	Alaska — Arey Island and the mainland
60°1′N 144°0′W	Pacific Ocean	Passing just west of Makemo atoll, French Polynesia (at 16°30′S 143°59′W); Passing just east of Hiti atoll, French Polynesia (at 16°44′S 144°3′W)
60°0′S 144°0′W	Southern Ocean	
75°31′S 144°0′W	Antarctica	Unclaimed territory

== See also ==
- 143rd meridian west
- 145th meridian west
