= 145th meridian west =

Line of longitude

145th meridian west

The meridian 145° west of Greenwich is a line of longitude that extends from the North Pole across the Arctic Ocean, North America, the Pacific Ocean, the Southern Ocean, and Antarctica to the South Pole.

The 145th meridian west forms a great circle with the 35th meridian east.

== From Pole to Pole ==
Starting at the North Pole and heading south to the South Pole, the 145th meridian west passes through:

Co-ordinates	Country, territory or sea	Notes
90°0′N 145°0′W	Arctic Ocean	
73°4′N 145°0′W	Beaufort Sea	
69°59′N 145°0′W	United States	Alaska
60°25′N 145°0′W	Pacific Ocean	
14°25′S 145°0′W	French Polynesia	Takaroa atoll
14°30′S 145°0′W	Pacific Ocean	Passing just east of Takapoto atoll, French Polynesia (at 14°36′S 145°8′W); Passing just east of Kauehi atoll, French Polynesia (at 15°55′S 145°3′W)
16°6′S 145°0′W	French Polynesia	Raraka atoll
16°9′S 145°0′W	Pacific Ocean	Passing just east of Faaite atoll, French Polynesia (at 16°44′S 145°4′W); Passing just west of Tahanea atoll, French Polynesia (at 16°49′S 144°58′W); Passing just west of Hereheretue atoll, French Polynesia (at 19°53′S 144°59′W)
60°0′S 145°0′W	Southern Ocean	
75°27′S 145°0′W	Antarctica	Unclaimed territory

== See also ==
- 144th meridian west
- 146th meridian west
