= 143rd meridian east =

Line of longitude

143rd meridian east (interactive map)

The 143rd meridian east of Greenwich is a line of longitude that extends from the North Pole across the Arctic Ocean, Asia, the Pacific Ocean, Australasia, the Indian Ocean, the Southern Ocean, and Antarctica to the South Pole.

The 143rd meridian east forms a great circle with the 37th meridian west.

== From Pole to Pole ==
Starting at the North Pole and heading south to the South Pole, the 143rd meridian east passes through:

Co-ordinates	Country, territory or sea	Notes
90°0′N 143°0′E	Arctic Ocean	
75°49′N 143°0′E	Russia	Sakha Republic — Kotelny Island, New Siberian Islands
74°53′N 143°0′E	East Siberian Sea	Sannikov Strait
73°42′N 143°0′E	Russia	Sakha Republic — Great Lyakhovsky Island, New Siberian Islands
73°12′N 143°0′E	East Siberian Sea	Laptev Strait
72°42′N 143°0′E	Russia	Sakha Republic; Khabarovsk Krai — from 61°55′N 143°0′E
59°19′N 143°0′E	Sea of Okhotsk	
53°38′N 143°0′E	Russia	Sakhalin Oblast — island of Sakhalin
49°9′N 143°0′E	Sea of Okhotsk	
47°16′N 143°0′E	Russia	Sakhalin Oblast — island of Sakhalin
46°36′N 143°0′E	Sea of Okhotsk	
44°33′N 143°0′E	Japan	Hokkaidō Prefecture — island of Hokkaidō
42°5′N 143°0′E	Pacific Ocean	Passing just west of Aua Island, Papua New Guinea (at 1°28′S 143°2′E); Passing just east of Wuvulu Island, Papua New Guinea (at 1°44′S 142°52′E)
3°21′S 143°0′E	Papua New Guinea	
9°7′S 143°0′E	Coral Sea	Torres Strait — passing amongst the Torres Strait Islands, Queensland, Australia
11°56′S 143°0′E	Australia	Queensland; New South Wales — from 29°0′S 143°0′E; Victoria — from 34°41′S 143°0′E
38°37′S 143°0′E	Indian Ocean	Australian authorities consider this to be part of the Southern Ocean
60°0′S 143°0′E	Southern Ocean	
66°57′S 143°0′E	Antarctica	Australian Antarctic Territory, claimed by Australia

== See also ==
- 142nd meridian east
- 144th meridian east
