= 143rd meridian west =

Line of longitude

143rd meridian west

The meridian 143° west of Greenwich is a line of longitude that extends from the North Pole across the Arctic Ocean, North America, the Pacific Ocean, the Southern Ocean, and Antarctica to the South Pole.

The 143rd meridian west line forms a great circle with the 37th meridian east.

== From Pole to Pole ==
Starting at the North Pole and heading south to the South Pole, the 143rd meridian west passes through:

Co-ordinates	Country, territory or sea	Notes
90°0′N 143°0′W	Arctic Ocean	
73°22′N 143°0′W	Beaufort Sea	
70°5′N 143°0′W	United States	Alaska
60°5′N 143°0′W	Pacific Ocean	Passing just east of Taenga atoll, French Polynesia (at 16°24′S 143°1′W); Passing just west of Nihiru atoll, French Polynesia (at 16°43′S 142°53′W); Passing just east of Marutea Nord atoll, French Polynesia (at 17°0′S 143°3′W); Passing just east of Reitoru atoll, French Polynesia (at 17°51′S 143°3′W); Passing just east of Nukutepipi atoll, French Polynesia (at 20°42′S 143°4′W)
60°0′S 143°0′W	Southern Ocean	
75°31′S 143°0′W	Antarctica	Unclaimed territory

== See also ==
- 142nd meridian west
- 144th meridian west
