= 35th meridian east =

Line of longitude

35th meridian east (interactive map)

The meridian 35° east of Greenwich is a line of longitude that extends from the North Pole across the Arctic Ocean, Europe, Asia, Africa, the Indian Ocean, the Southern Ocean, and Antarctica to the South Pole.

The 35th meridian east forms a great circle with the 145th meridian west.

== From Pole to Pole ==
Starting at the North Pole and heading south to the South Pole, the 35th meridian east passes through:

| Co-ordinates | Country, territory or sea | Notes |
|---|---|---|
| 90°0′N 35°0′E | Arctic Ocean | |
| 80°18′N 35°0′E | Barents Sea | |
| 69°12′N 35°0′E | Russia | Kola Peninsula |
| 66°33′N 35°0′E | White Sea | Kandalaksha Gulf |
| 65°45′N 35°0′E | Russia | Nikonov Island |
| 65°43′N 35°0′E | White Sea | |
| 64°45′N 35°0′E | Russia | Shujostrov Island |
| 64°44′N 35°0′E | White Sea | Onega Bay |
| 64°25′N 35°0′E | Russia | Passing through Lake Onega |
| 51°14′N 35°0′E | Ukraine | |
| 46°15′N 35°0′E | Sea of Azov | |
| 45°44′N 35°0′E | Ukraine | Crimea (claimed and controlled by Russia) |
| 44°50′N 35°0′E | Black Sea | |
| 42°5′N 35°0′E | Turkey | |
| 36°43′N 35°0′E | Mediterranean Sea | |
| 32°50′N 35°0′E | Israel | Port of Haifa |
| 32°13′N 35°0′E | Palestine | West Bank, for about 19km |
| 32°03′N 35°0′E | Israel | For about 3.5km |
| 32°01′N 35°0′E | Palestine | West Bank, for about 7.5km |
| 32°01′N 35°0′E | | No man’s land between 1949 Armistice Lines, for about 2.5km |
| 31°56′N 35°0′E | Israel | For about 6km |
| 31°52′N 35°0′E | | No man’s land between 1949 Armistice Lines, for about 2km |
| 31°51′N 35°0′E | Palestine | West Bank, Latrun salient, for about 7.5km |
| 31°50′N 35°0′E | | No man’s land between 1949 Armistice Lines, for about 1.25km |
| 31°49′N 35°0′E | Israel | For about 19km |
| 31°39′N 35°0′E | Palestine | West Bank, near Tel Adullam, for about 32km |
| 31°21′N 35°0′E | Israel | For about 193km |
| 29°37′N 35°0′E | Jordan | Near Aqaba |
| 29°21′N 35°0′E | Saudi Arabia | |
| 28°6′N 35°0′E | Red Sea | |
| 24°49′N 35°0′E | Egypt | |
| 22°51′N 35°0′E | Hala'ib Triangle | Disputed territory, controlled by Egypt and claimed by Sudan |
| 22°0′N 35°0′E | Sudan | |
| 11°20′N 35°0′E | Ethiopia | For about 18km |
| 11°10′N 35°0′E | Sudan | For about 6km |
| 11°7′N 35°0′E | Ethiopia | |
| 6°28′N 35°0′E | South Sudan | For about 9km |
| 6°24′N 35°0′E | Ethiopia | |
| 6°1′N 35°0′E | South Sudan | For about 6km |
| 5°58′N 35°0′E | Ethiopia | For about 4km |
| 5°56′N 35°0′E | South Sudan | |
| 4°37′N 35°0′E | Kenya | |
| 1°58′N 35°0′E | Uganda | |
| 1°40′N 35°0′E | Kenya | |
| 1°32′S 35°0′E | Tanzania | |
| 11°34′S 35°0′E | Mozambique | |
| 13°36′S 35°0′E | Malawi | Passing through Lake Malawi |
| 16°47′S 35°0′E | Mozambique | |
| 19°47′S 35°0′E | Indian Ocean | |
| 20°46′S 35°0′E | Mozambique | |
| 24°40′S 35°0′E | Indian Ocean | |
| 60°0′S 35°0′E | Southern Ocean | |
| 68°59′S 35°0′E | Antarctica | Queen Maud Land, claimed by Norway |

== See also ==
- 34th meridian east
- 36th meridian east
