= Victoria Island (Russia) =

Arctic island of the Russian Federation

Russian: Остров Виктория
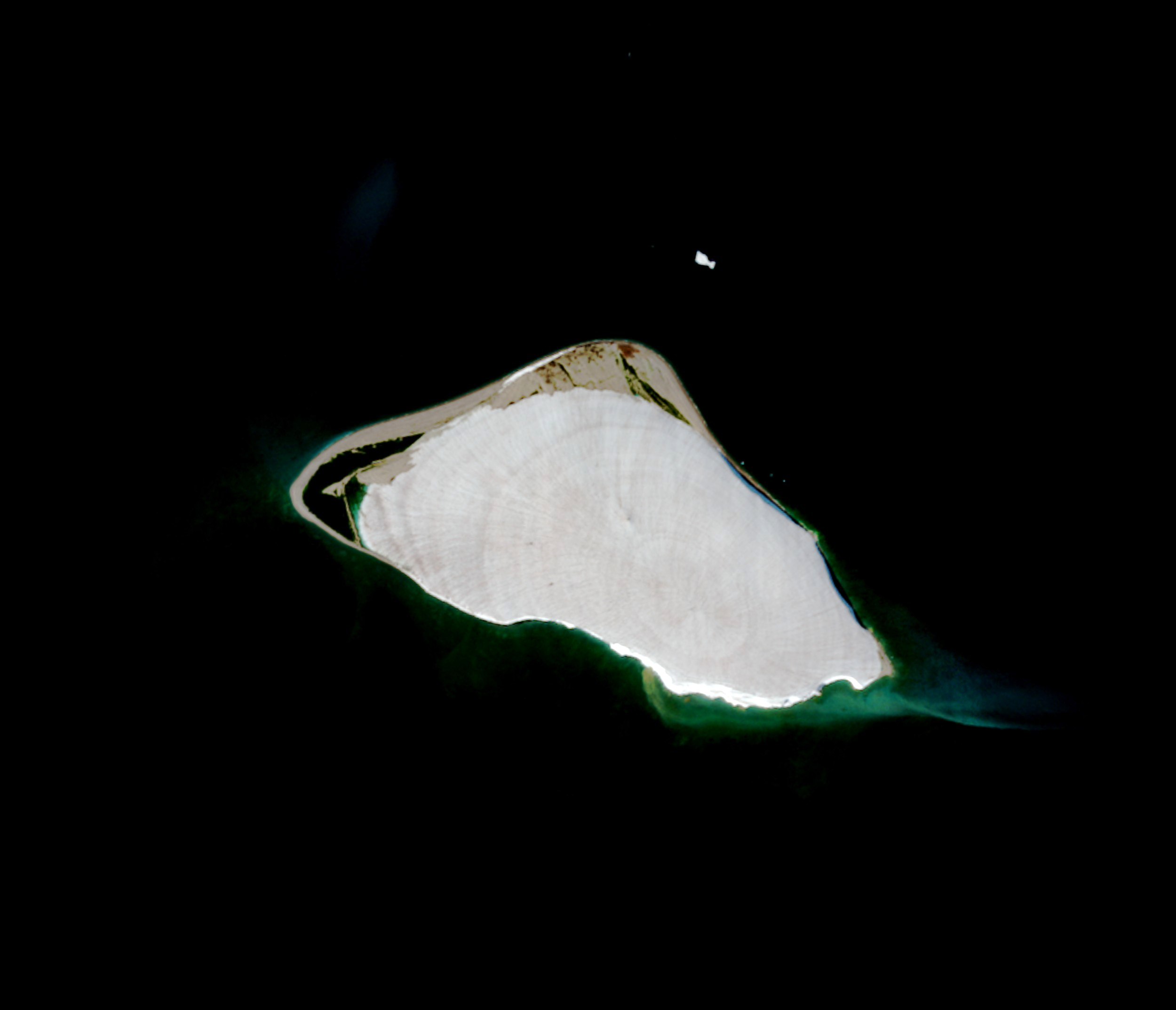
- Victoria Island is mostly covered with ice and snow the whole year round (Sentinel-2 image, 2020)

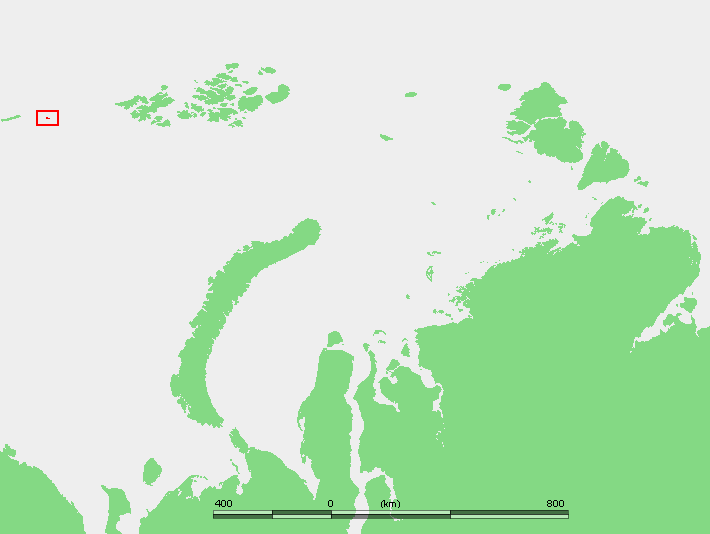
- Location of Victoria Island in the Arctic Ocean

Geography
- Location: Queen Victoria Sea, Arctic Ocean
- Coordinates: 80°09′N 36°46′E
- Area: 10.8 km^{2} (4.2 sq mi)
- Length: 6.5 km (4.04 mi)
- Width: 3.3 km (2.05 mi)
- Highest elevation: 105 m (344 ft)
- Highest point: Ice cap HP

Administration
- Russia

Demographics
- Population: 0

Victoria Island (Russian: Остров Виктория; Ostrov Viktoriya) is a small Arctic island of the Russian Federation. It is located at 80°9′N 36°46′E, halfway between the Norwegian archipelago of Svalbard and the Russian archipelago of Franz Josef Land. It was annexed to the USSR in 1932 (six years after the rest of Franz Josef Land).

== Geography ==
This westernmost of all Russian Arctic islands is now administered as part of Franz Josef Land (Zemlya Frantsa-Josifa) and belongs to the Arkhangelsk Oblast administrative division of the Russian Federation.

The maximum height of Victoria Island is 105 m (344 ft). The Northwestern cape is known as Cape Knipovich (Russian: Мыс Книповича; Mys Knipovicha).

=== Ice cap ===
Victoria Island has a surface area of 10.8 km^{2} (4.2 sq mi) and was formerly almost completely covered by an ice cap where the highest point reached 105 m (344 ft) above sea level. In the 1990s there was an area of about 10 hectares (25 acres) at the northern end of the island that was unglaciated. Since then the ice cover has retreated and has remained a narrow strip of unglaciated shore stretching along the northwestern side, between the two, almost vegetation-free flat gravel capes which stick out from the ice cap in the north and in the west. There is the remains of a small military weather installation on the northern cape, which was abandoned in 1994. By 2012 the surface of the ice cap was only 6.1 km^{2} (2.4 sq mi).

== History ==
The island was discovered on 20 July 1898 by two Norwegian sealing captains, Johannes Nilsen and Ludvig Bernard Sebulonsen. The next day, captain P. W. Nilsen of the steam yacht Victoria, owned by the English adventurer Arnold Pike, sighted the island and named it after the yacht.

Although Victoria Island is situated only less than 32 nautical miles (59 km; 37 mi) off Kvitøya in the Svalbard archipelago, it lies east of the territories put under the sovereignty of Norway according to the Spitsbergen Treaty in 1920. Consequently, the island was considered Terra nullius, until a Soviet decree of 15 April 1926 that claimed a Soviet sector in the Arctic region that also included Franz Josef Land and Victoria Island. Norway was notified on 6 May and officially protested on 19 December, contesting the Soviet claim.

The following years Norwegian authorities put much effort into annexing Victoria Island and Franz Josef Land. The Ministry of Foreign Affairs did not wish to take any measures to lay official claims but had no objection to private initiatives. In 1929 consul Lars Christensen of Sandefjord, a whaling tycoon whose expeditions had annexed Bouvet Island and Peter I Island in the Antarctic, funded an expedition of two vessels, SS Torsnes and MC Hvalrossen. Upon departure from Tromsø the crew were given detailed instructions to erect a staffed wireless station and leave a wintering crew on Franz Josef Land, and also to claim Victoria Island on behalf of Christensen. The expedition never reached Franz Josef Land nor Victoria Island due to severe ice conditions. On 29 July 1929, Professor Schmidt of the Soviet Sedov Expedition raised the Soviet flag at Tikaya Bay, Hooker Island, and declared that Franz Josef Land was a part of the Soviet Union.

Norway did not officially contest the Soviet annexation of Franz Josef Land itself but continued their efforts regarding Victoria Island and a new attempt was made the following year. The ship MS Bratvaag arrived at Victoria Island on 8 August 1930. At 04:30 a group of seven men went ashore, among them the expedition leader Gunnar Horn and the ship's captain Peder Eliassen. Horn claimed the island and raised a sign on the beach, stating the claim, and left building materials for a cabin, nails and a hammer. The true purpose of the Bratvaag Expedition was however kept secret, and Norway never officially claimed the island later, probably due to fear of upsetting the Soviet Union. In September 1932, it became known that the Soviet Union had annexed the island.

The Bratvaag Expedition nevertheless became well-known due to the findings of the long-lost remains of the Swedish explorer S. A. Andrée's Arctic balloon expedition of 1897 on nearby Kvitøya.

== See also ==
- List of glaciers in Russia
- List of islands of Russia
- Queen Victoria Sea

== Bibliography ==
- I. Gjertz, B. Mørkved, "Norwegian Arctic Expansionism, Victoria Island (Russia) and the Bratvaag Expedition", Arctic, Vol. 51, No. 4 (December 1998), P. 330-335 (Available as PDF)
- Andreas Umbreit, "Spitzbergen: Svalbard – Franz Josef Land – Jan Mayen" (Brandt Guides, 2009). ISBN 978-1-84162-240-8.
