= 35th meridian west =

Line of longitude

35th meridian west

The meridian 35° west of Greenwich is a line of longitude that extends from the North Pole across the Arctic Ocean, Greenland, the Atlantic Ocean, South America, the Southern Ocean, and Antarctica to the South Pole.

== From Pole to Pole ==
Starting at the North Pole and heading south to the South Pole, the 35th meridian west passes through:

Co-ordinates	Country, territory or sea	Notes
90°0′N 35°0′W	Arctic Ocean	
83°34′N 35°0′W	Greenland	Gertrud Rask Land (Peary Land)
67°11′N 35°0′W	Greenland	Crown Prince Frederick Range
66°17′N 35°0′W	Atlantic Ocean	
6°22′S 35°0′W	Brazil	Rio Grande do Norte — for about 16 km Paraíba — from 6°31′S 35°0′W, the easternmost part of South America; Pernambuco — from 7°28′S 35°0′W, passing just west of Recife at 8°3′S 34°54′W
8°31′S 35°0′W	Atlantic Ocean	Passing just west of Clerke Rocks, South Georgia and the South Sandwich Islands (at 55°1′S 34°43′W)
60°0′S 35°0′W	Southern Ocean	
77°34′S 35°0′W	Antarctica	Claimed by both Argentina (Argentine Antarctica) and United Kingdom (British Antarctic Territory)

== See also ==
- 34th meridian west
- 36th meridian west
