= Kvitøya =

Island in the Svalbard archipelago in the Arctic Ocean

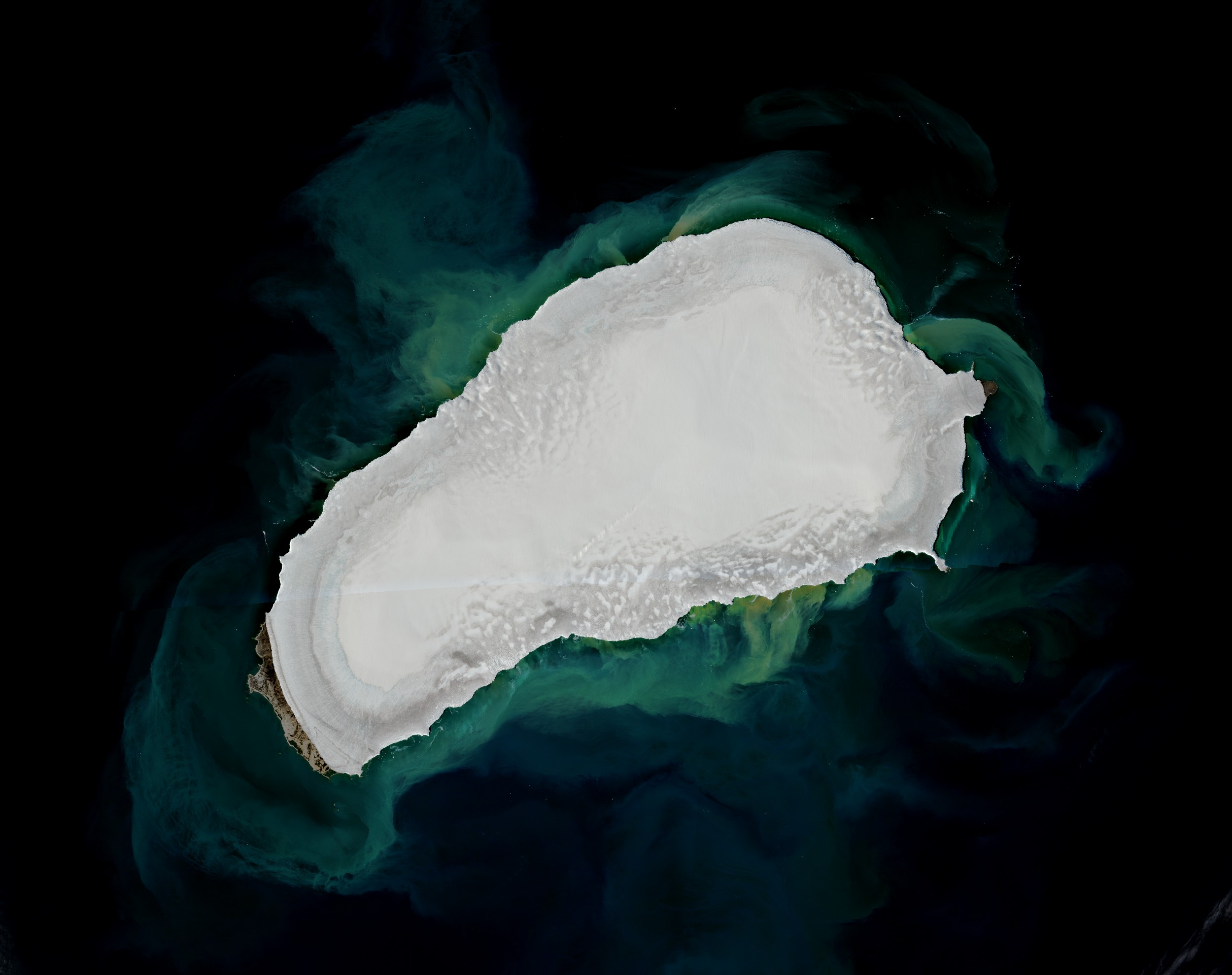
- Sentinel-2 image (2020)

- Location in Svalbard

Geography
- Location: Arctic Ocean
- Coordinates: 80°09′05″N 32°35′37″E
- Archipelago: Svalbard
- Area: 682 km^{2} (263 sq mi)
- Highest elevation: 410 m (1350 ft)

Administration
- Norway

Demographics
- Population: 0

Kvitøya (English: "White Island") is an island in the Svalbard archipelago in the Arctic Ocean, with an area of 682 square kilometres (263 sq mi). It is the easternmost part of the Kingdom of Norway. The closest Russian Arctic possession, Victoria Island, lies only 62 kilometres (39 mi) to the east of Kvitøya.

The island is almost completely covered by Kvitøyjøkulen, an ice cap with an area of 705 square kilometres (272 sq mi) with a classical, hourglass-shaped dome, which has given it its name. The few ice-free land areas are each only a few square kilometres large and very barren and rocky, the largest being Andréeneset on the southwest corner of the island. Kvitøya is a part of the Nordaust-Svalbard Nature Reserve.

Kvitøya, along with nearby Abel Island, are the only landmasses under airspace that does not belong to any flight information region.

== Etymology ==
The present name was given by whaler Johan Kjeldsen of Tromsø in 1876. The original spelling of the name from 1876 was Hvidøen (Danish–Norwegian). In 1927, it was changed to Kvitøya. Like other names in the Norwegian Arctic and Antarctic islands and areas the Nynorsk form of Norwegian is used in the name – the Bokmål form would have been Hvitøyen or Hvitøya. It is known as Vitön in Swedish.

== History ==
Kvitøya was discovered by the Dutchman Cornelis Giles in 1707, and it was seen under the name 'Giles Land' or 'Gillis Land' on maps in different shapes, sizes and positions throughout the centuries.

=== Andrée's Arctic balloon expedition ===
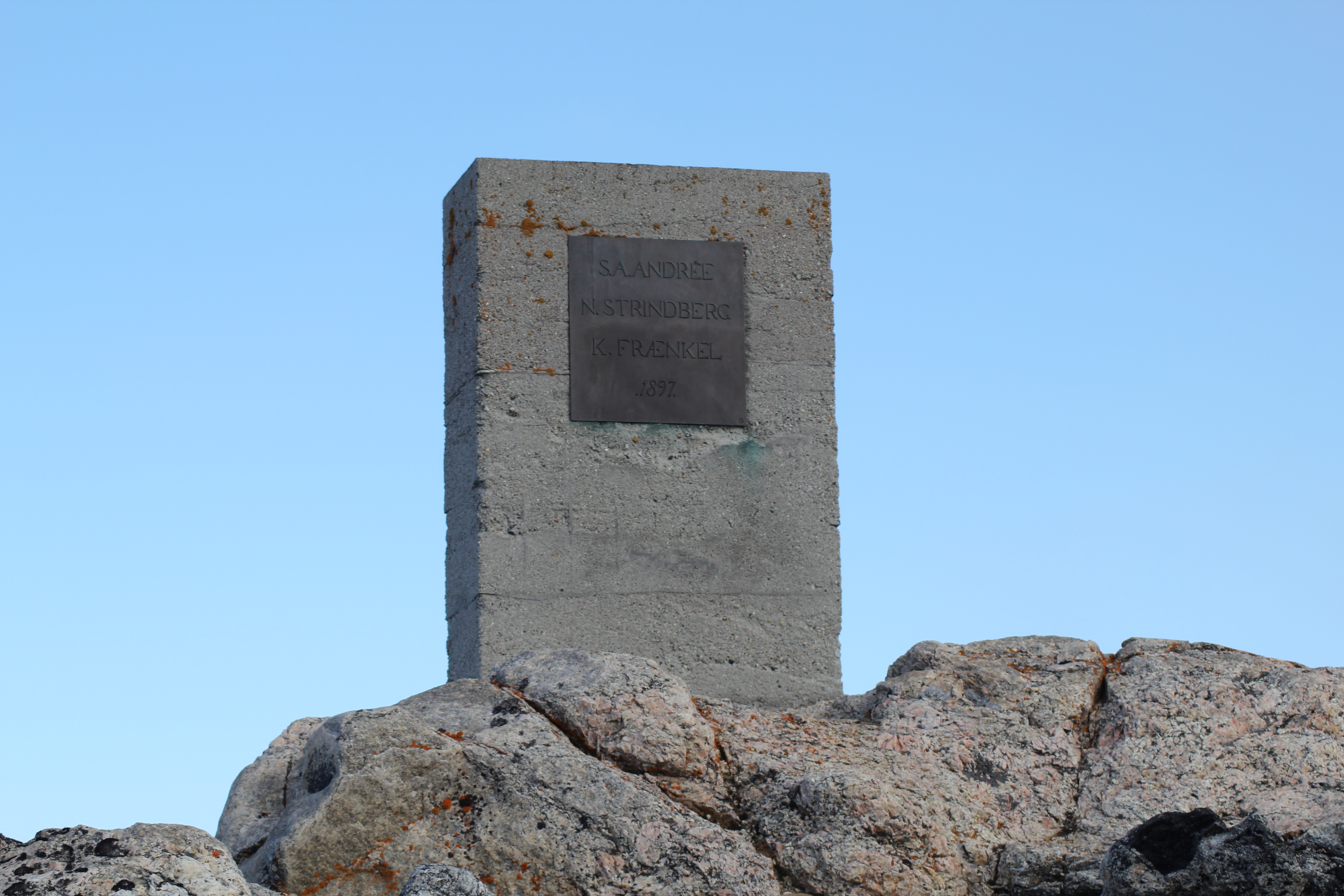
Monument to Andrée's Arctic balloon expedition

The island was the resting place of Andrée's Arctic balloon expedition of 1897, organised by S. A. Andrée. The expedition had attempted to overfly the North Pole in a hydrogen balloon, but was forced down on the pack ice about 300 kilometres (190 mi) north of Kvitøya on 14 July, less than three days after their launch. They reached the island on foot by 6 October and settled on the only ice free part on the island, on what is now called Andréeneset.

The fate of the expedition was one of the great mysteries of the Arctic for over three decades, until its remains were discovered by the ship Bratvaag in 1930, and diaries, logs of scientific observations and photographs—glass negative plates, which had been deep frozen and could be developed—were recovered at the site. Modern researchers hold that the three members of the expedition died within two weeks of reaching the island.

A monument commemorating the three men, S. A. Andrée, Nils Strindberg and Knut Frænkel is erected on the island. Another monument, put there by the "Stockholm expedition" in 1997 to commemorate the 100 years anniversary of the tragic event, was later deliberately destroyed by the Svalbard authority, on the ground of it being illegally erected.

== Climate ==
Kvitøya has a Tundra climate (Köppen: ET), where no month has a mean daily temperature of above 10 °C (50 °F). The climate closely borders on an ice cap climate, with July and August being the only months with a mean daily temperature above freezing.

Climate data for Kvitøya
Month	Jan	Feb	Mar	Apr	May	Jun	Jul	Aug	Sep	Oct	Nov	Dec	Year
Mean daily maximum °C (°F)	−11 (12)	−11 (12)	−13 (9)	−11 (12)	−4 (25)	0 (32)	1 (34)	1 (34)	1 (34)	−2 (28)	−6 (21)	−8 (18)	−5 (23)
Daily mean °C (°F)	−13 (9)	−13 (9)	−15 (5)	−13.5 (7.7)	−5.5 (22.1)	−0.5 (31.1)	1 (34)	0.5 (32.9)	0 (32)	−2.5 (27.5)	−8.5 (16.7)	−10.5 (13.1)	−6.7 (20.0)
Mean daily minimum °C (°F)	−15 (5)	−15 (5)	−17 (1)	−16 (3)	−7 (19)	−1 (30)	1 (34)	0 (32)	−1 (30)	−3 (27)	−9 (16)	−12 (10)	−8 (18)
Average precipitation mm (inches)	14 (0.6)	12 (0.5)	16 (0.6)	12 (0.5)	11 (0.4)	14 (0.6)	16 (0.6)	16 (0.6)	16 (0.6)	26 (1.0)	25 (1.0)	26 (1.0)	204 (8)
Source: Besttimetovisit.co.uk

== See also ==
- List of islands in the Arctic Ocean
- List of islands of Norway
- Queen Victoria Sea
