= 34th meridian =

34th meridian may refer to:

- 34th meridian east, a line of longitude east of the Greenwich Meridian
- 34th meridian west, a line of longitude west of the Greenwich Meridian
