= 149th meridian =

149th meridian may refer to:

- 149th meridian east, a line of longitude east of the Greenwich Meridian
- 149th meridian west, a line of longitude west of the Greenwich Meridian

149th meridian west	149th meridian east
