= 2008–09 Australian region cyclone season =

Tropical cyclone season

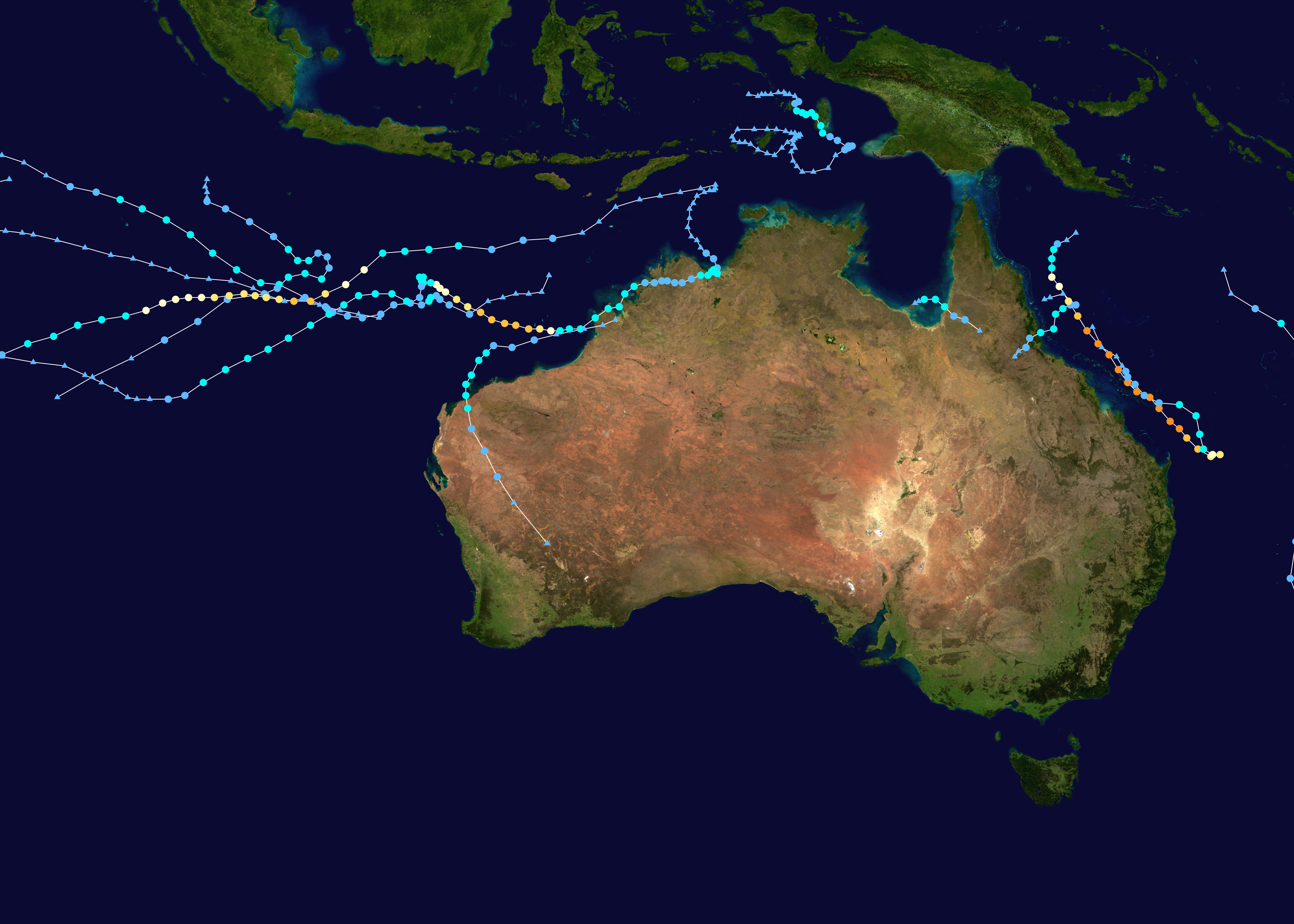
- Season summary map

Seasonal boundaries
- First system formed: 17 November 2008
- Last system dissipated: 18 May 2009

Strongest storm
- Name: Hamish
  - Maximum winds: 215 km/h (130 mph) (10-minute sustained)
  - Lowest pressure: 924 hPa (mbar)

Seasonal statistics
- Tropical lows: 24, 1 unofficial
- Tropical cyclones: 10, 1 unofficial
- Severe tropical cyclones: 3
- Total fatalities: 4 direct, 1 indirect
- Total damage: $103.3 million (2008 USD)

Related articles
- 2008–09 South-West Indian Ocean cyclone season; 2008–09 South Pacific cyclone season

The 2008–09 Australian region cyclone season was a near average tropical cyclone season. It officially started on 1 November 2008, and officially ended on 30 April 2009. This season was also the first time that the BoM implemented a "tropical cyclone year." The regional tropical cyclone operational plan defines a "tropical cyclone year" separately from a "tropical cyclone season"; the "tropical cyclone year" began on 1 July 2008 and ended on 30 June 2009.

The scope of the Australian region is limited to all areas south of the equator, east of 90°E and west of 160°E. This area includes Australia, Papua New Guinea, western parts of the Solomon Islands, East Timor and southern parts of Indonesia.

Tropical cyclones in this area are monitored by five Tropical Cyclone Warning Centres (TCWCs): the Australian Bureau of Meteorology in Perth, Darwin, and Brisbane; TCWC Jakarta in Indonesia; and TCWC Port Moresby in Papua New Guinea. The Joint Typhoon Warning Center issues unofficial warnings for the region, designating tropical depressions with the "S" suffix when they form west of 135°E, and the "P" suffix when they form east of 135°E.

== Seasonal forecasts ==
=== Bureau of Meteorology ===
In October 2008 ahead of the season starting on 1 November, the tropical cyclone warning centres in Perth, Darwin and Brisbane issued a seasonal outlook for their area of responsibility, which urged people to prepare for possible tropical cyclones. Within each outlook factors such as the high values of the Southern Oscillation Index, near average sea surface temperatures and the neutral El Niño–Southern Oscillation conditions were taken into account. TCWC Perth predicted within their seasonal outlook that the North-Western subregion between 105°E and 130°E would see an early start to the season. They also predicted that between 5 - 7 tropical cyclones would occur in the region during the season compared to an average of about 5 and that there was a likelihood of two tropical cyclones and one severe tropical cyclone impacting Western Australia. TCWC Darwin predicted that there might be an early start to the season within the Timor Sea and slightly above average numbers of tropical cyclones around northern Australia. They also noted that there was an even chance of having a severe tropical cyclone in the region during the season. Within their outlook TCWC Brisbane predicted that there would be a high amount of activity within the Australian Monsoon, and that the chances of a repeat of the widespread flooding rains were not great due to their being no well-established La Nina.

=== Others ===
During September 2008, the New Zealand National Institute of Water and Atmospheric Research (NIWA) and its partners issued a tropical cyclone outlook, for the South Pacific region between 135°E and 120°W.

On 26 September 2008 the New Zealand National Institute of Water & Atmospheric Research issued a seasonal forecast for the whole of the southern Pacific Ocean to the east of 150°E. They predicted that the 2008–09 South Pacific cyclone season would see an average risk of cyclones forming, which meant that 8-10 tropical cyclones with wind speeds greater than 35 knots would form east of 150°E.

== Systems ==
=== Tropical Cyclone Anika ===
- Category 2 tropical cyclone (Australian scale)
- Tropical storm (SSHWS)
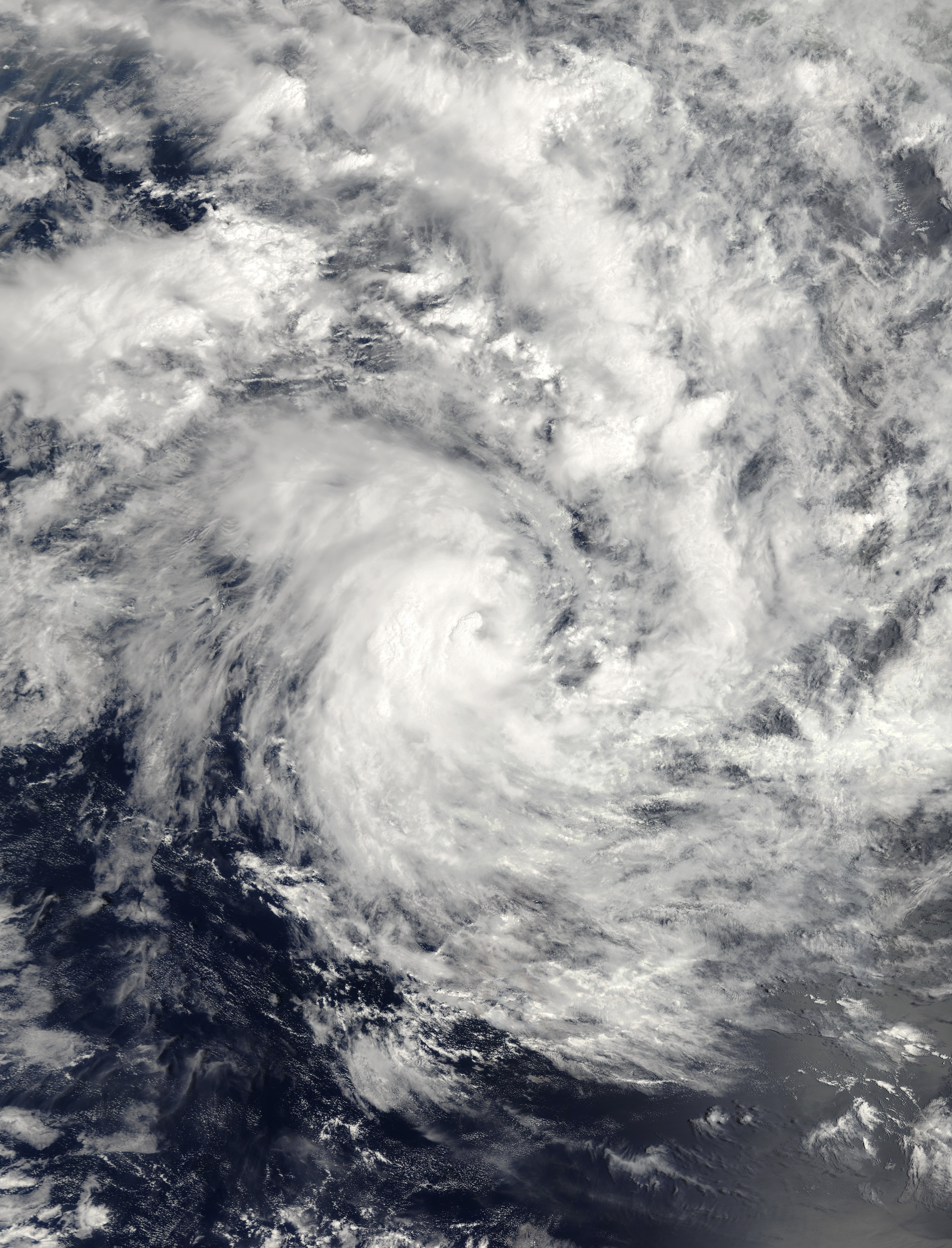
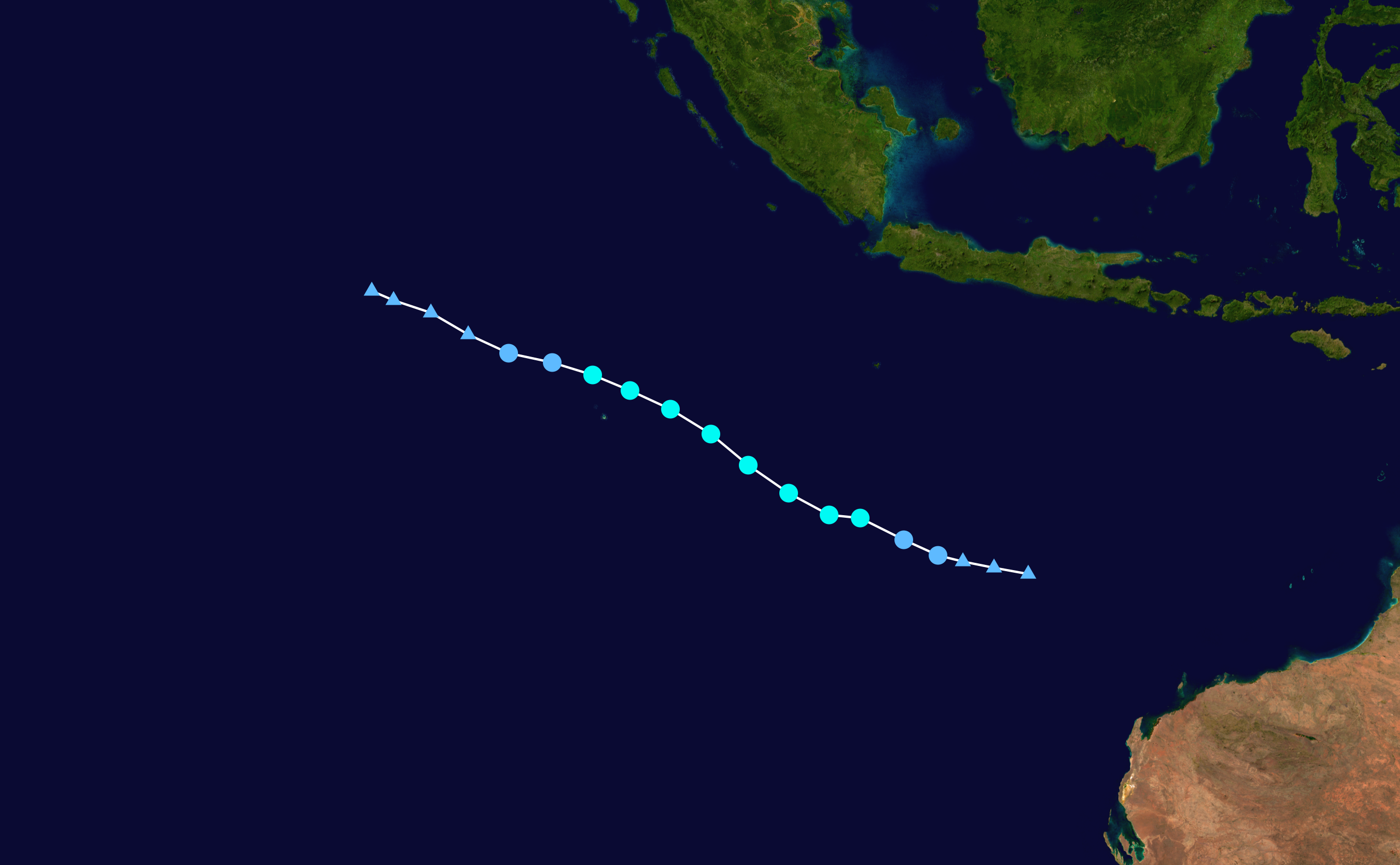
- Duration: 17 November – 22 November
- Peak intensity: 95 km/h (60 mph) (10-min); 990 hPa (mbar)

During 17 November TCWC Perth and TCWC Jakarta reported that Tropical Low 02U had developed within the monsoon trough about 925 km (575 mi) to the northeast of the Cocos Islands. During the next day the low quickly developed further as it was steered on a south-easterly course by an area of persisting north-westerly steering winds. TCWC Perth, TCWC Jakarta and the JTWC then reported early on 19 November that the low had developed into a weak tropical cyclone with Perth naming it Anika. On 20 November, Anika reached its peak intensity as a Category 2 cyclone with winds of 95 km/h (60 mph) and a pressure of 984 hPa. The intensification was the result of deep convection wrapping around the center of circulation and Dvorak Technique intensity estimates reaching T3.5. Cyclone Anika passed to the north of the Cocos Islands, and cyclone warnings were cancelled later that day. Later that day, it weakened to a Category 1 cyclone. As the storm tracked over cooler waters, it continued to weaken. By 21 November, the storm weakened to a tropical low due to increasing wind shear. The next day, the Anika dissipated over open waters.

=== Severe Tropical Cyclone Billy ===
- Category 4 severe tropical cyclone (Australian scale)
- Category 3 tropical cyclone (SSHWS)
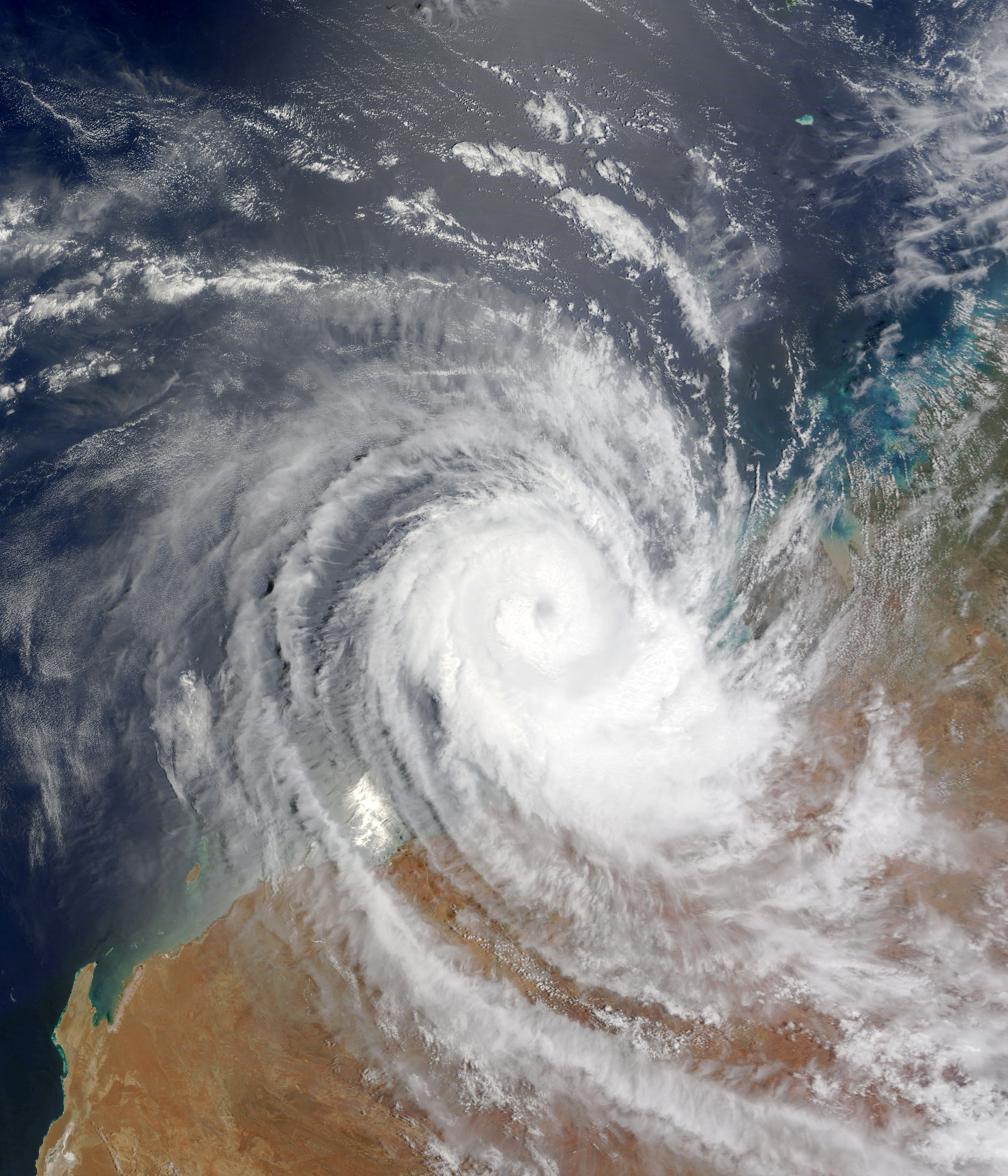
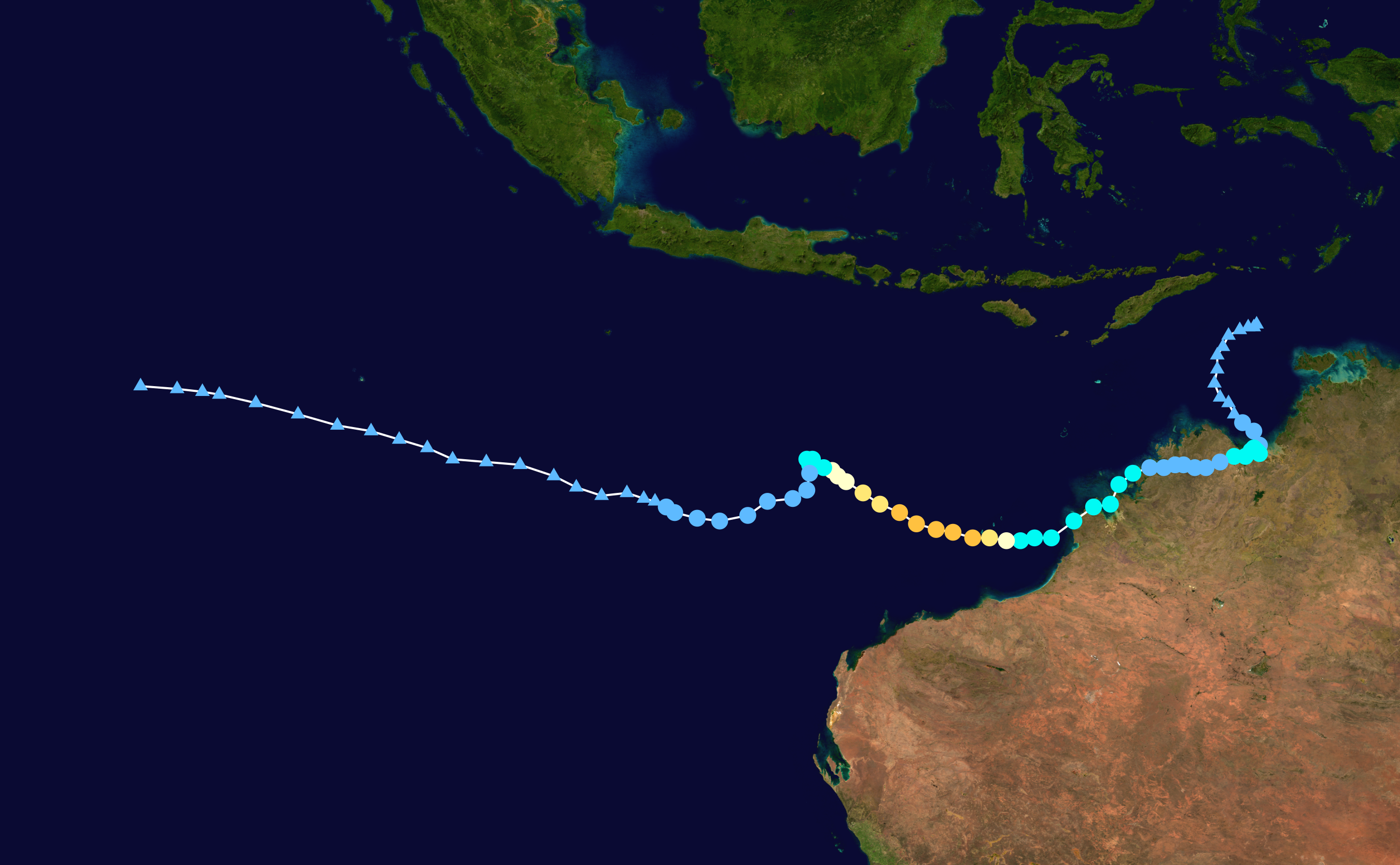
- Duration: 17 December – 28 December
- Peak intensity: 175 km/h (110 mph) (10-min); 950 hPa (mbar)

On 17 December, a tropical low formed in the Arafura Sea north-west of Darwin in the Northern Territory. It moved into the Joseph Bonaparte Gulf and was very slow moving. On the night of 18 December it intensified into a Category 1 cyclone and was named Billy. On 20 December, Billy made landfall as a Category 2 cyclone approximately 65 kilometres north of Wyndham. After then, it weakened to a tropical low and moved slowly towards the southwest. It then moved off the coast just north of Kuri Bay and redeveloped into a tropical cyclone on 22 December as the storm turned to the north-north east. Late on 24 December, Billy began to rapidly intensify and reached Category 4 strength early on 25 December and became a typical annular cyclone. Later that same day, Billy weakened into a category 3 cyclone as it replaced its eyewall and TCWC Perth issued their final tropical cyclone advisory as the system was moving away from land. Billy weakened into a category 1 cyclone on 27 December and weakened into a tropical low on 28 December. Later that day, TCWC Perth issued their final advisory, as the system continued to weaken.

Two remote indigenous communities, Kalumburu and Oombulgurri were cut off by flood waters with roads and the airstrips closed.

=== Tropical Low 04U ===
- Tropical low (Australian scale)
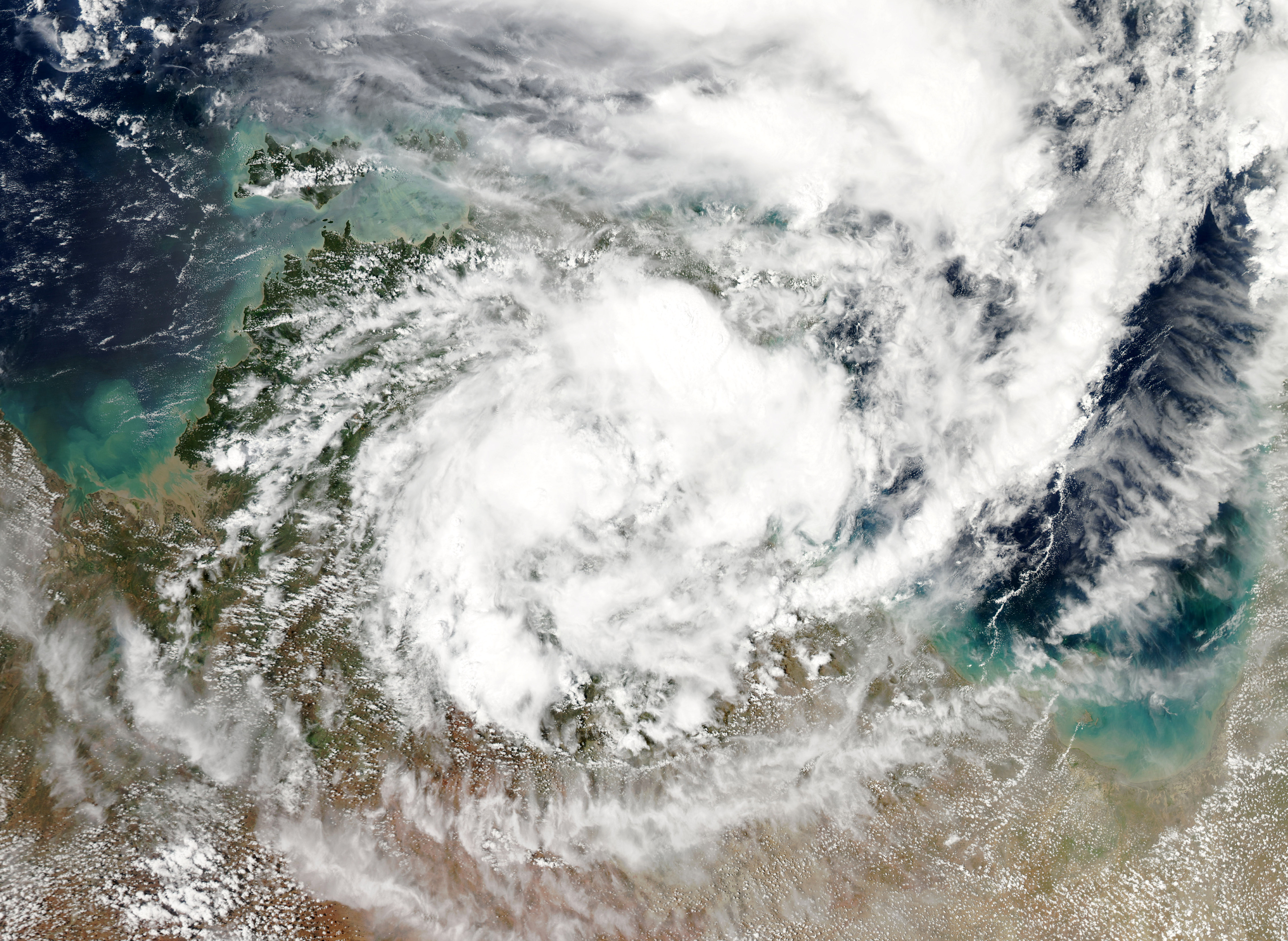
- Duration: 21 December – 24 December
- Peak intensity: 55 km/h (35 mph) (10-min); 1000 hPa (mbar)

On 20 December, an area of low pressure, associated with developing convection, formed about 1000 km (560 mi) east of Darwin in the Gulf of Carpentaria. The next day, the Bureau of Meteorology in Darwin designated the system as a tropical low. Banding features developed along the southern portion of the system and further development was anticipated as the low was located underneath an anticyclone. Around 5:26 a.m. local time on 23 December, the low made landfall near Port Roper, preventing further development of the storm. About 36 hours after landfall, the Australian Bureau of Meteorology issued their final advisory on the system as it dissipated over land.

=== Tropical Low 05U ===
- Tropical low (Australian scale)
- Duration: 23 December – 28 December
- Peak intensity: 35 km/h (25 mph) (10-min); 1003 hPa (mbar)

On 23 December, TCWC Brisbane noted that a weak tropical low had formed within the Solomon Sea, about 1330 kilometres to the north east of Cairns. Over the next few days the low moved towards the south west into the Coral Sea.

=== Tropical Cyclone Charlotte ===
- Category 1 tropical cyclone (Australian scale)
- Tropical storm (SSHWS)
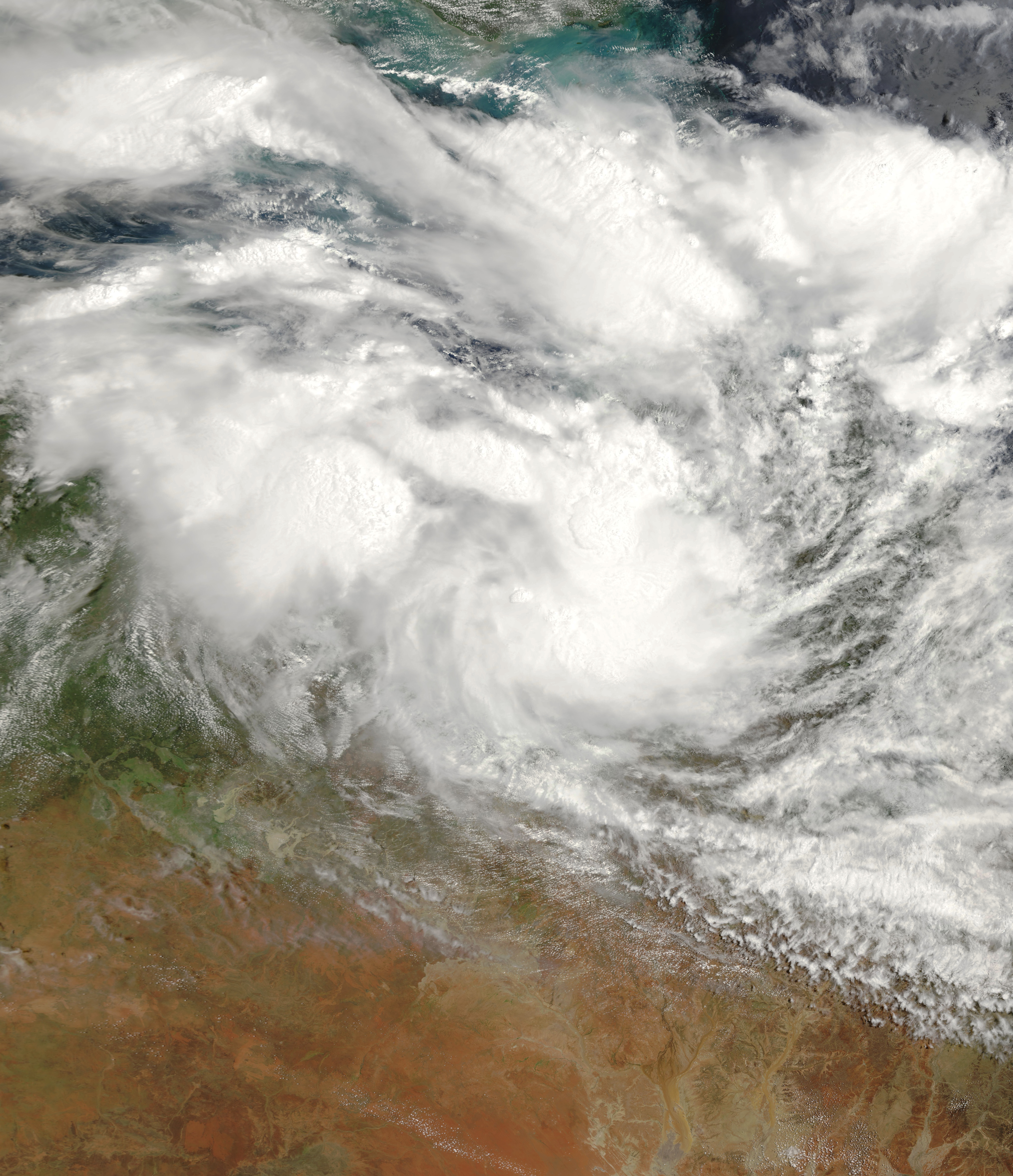
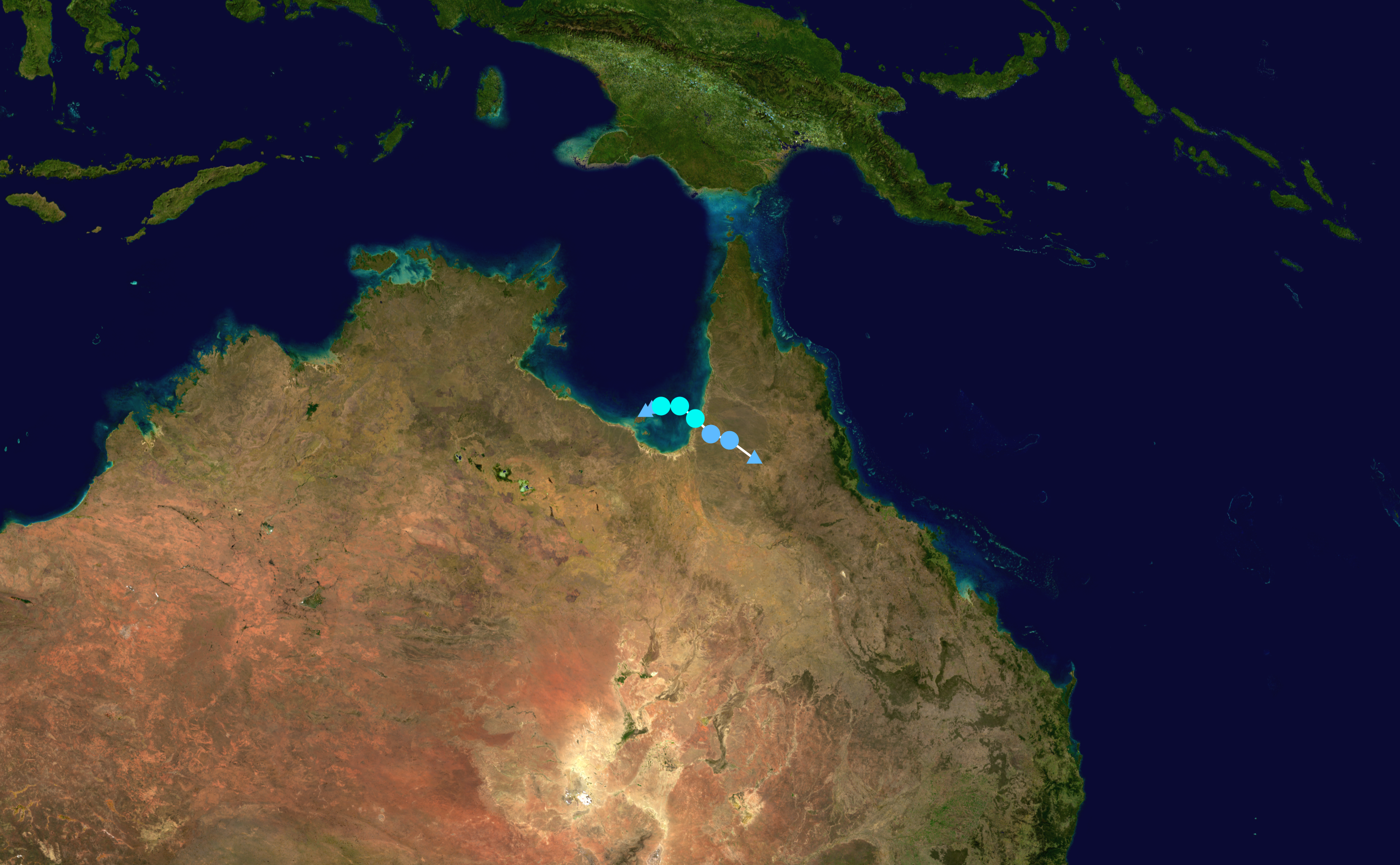
- Duration: 8 January – 12 January
- Peak intensity: 85 km/h (50 mph) (10-min); 986 hPa (mbar)

On 8 January, TCWC Darwin identified a Tropical Low in the southern Gulf of Carpentaria. The next day TCWC Brisbane begin to issue advisories on the low and issued Cyclone Watches for coastal communities between Aurukun on the Cape York Peninsula and the Northern Territory/Queensland border. On 11 January, the Tropical Low developed into Tropical Cyclone Charlotte, and on 12 January at 4:00am (AEST), crossed the coast near the Gilbert River Mouth with wind gusts of 120 km/h (70 mph).

Heavy rains, estimated at over 150 mm (5.9 in), from Tropical Cyclone Charlotte flooded at least 100 homes in low-lying areas on Cape York including Babinda, Mount Sophia and at Normanton. The rains also caused mudslides which, as described by an affected home-owner "...it's just mud, mud everywhere". The main road to Karumba was also cut off by flood waters. Damages caused by the storm were estimated to be at US$15 million.

=== Tropical Low 07U (05F) ===
- Tropical low (Australian scale)
- Duration: 11 January – 11 January
- Peak intensity: 35 km/h (25 mph) (10-min);

On 11 January a tropical low formed in the Coral Sea. The winds peaked at 35 miles per hour (56 km/h). The low exited the basin and intensified into Tropical Depression 05F.

=== Tropical Cyclone Dominic ===
- Category 2 tropical cyclone (Australian scale)
- Tropical storm (SSHWS)
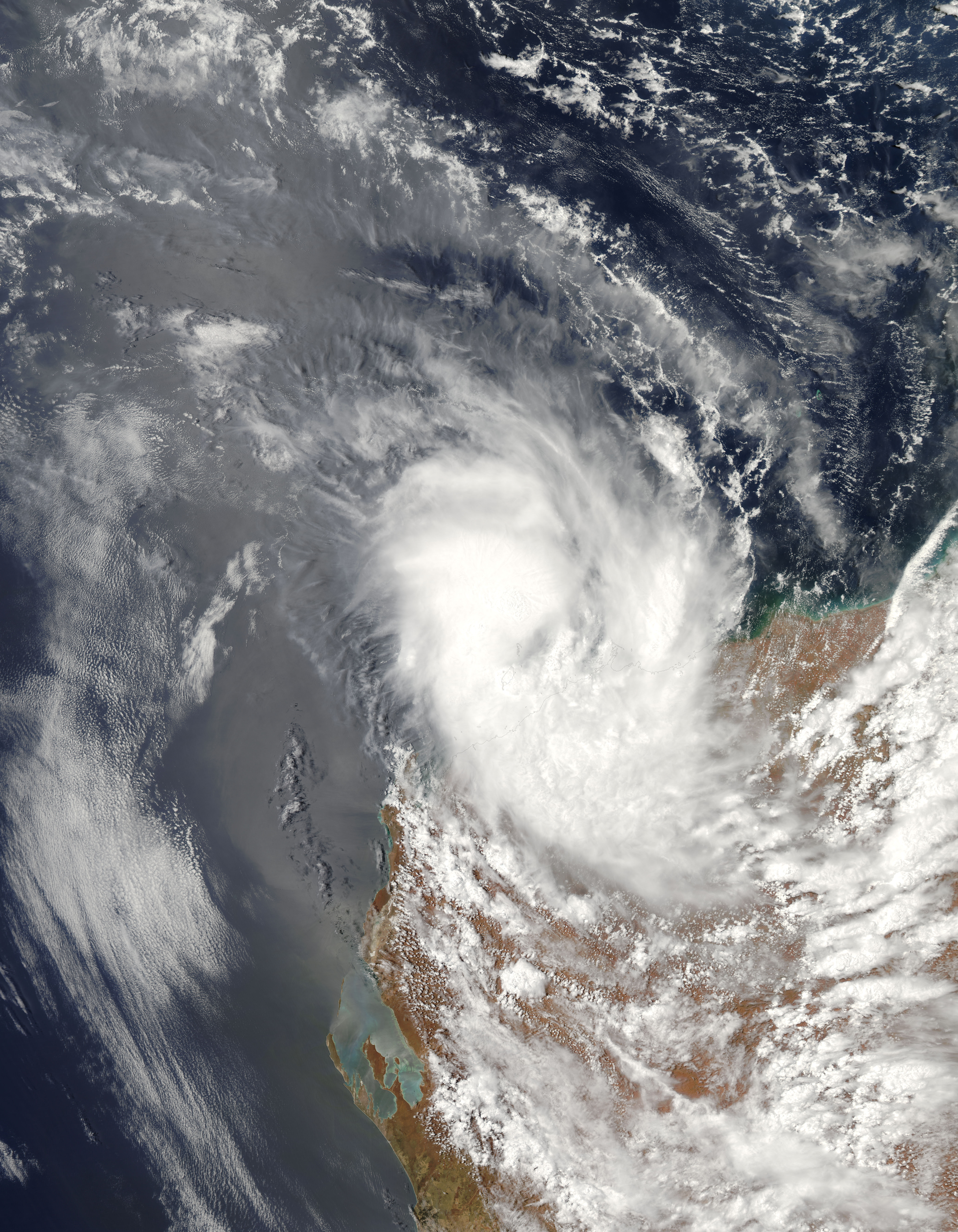
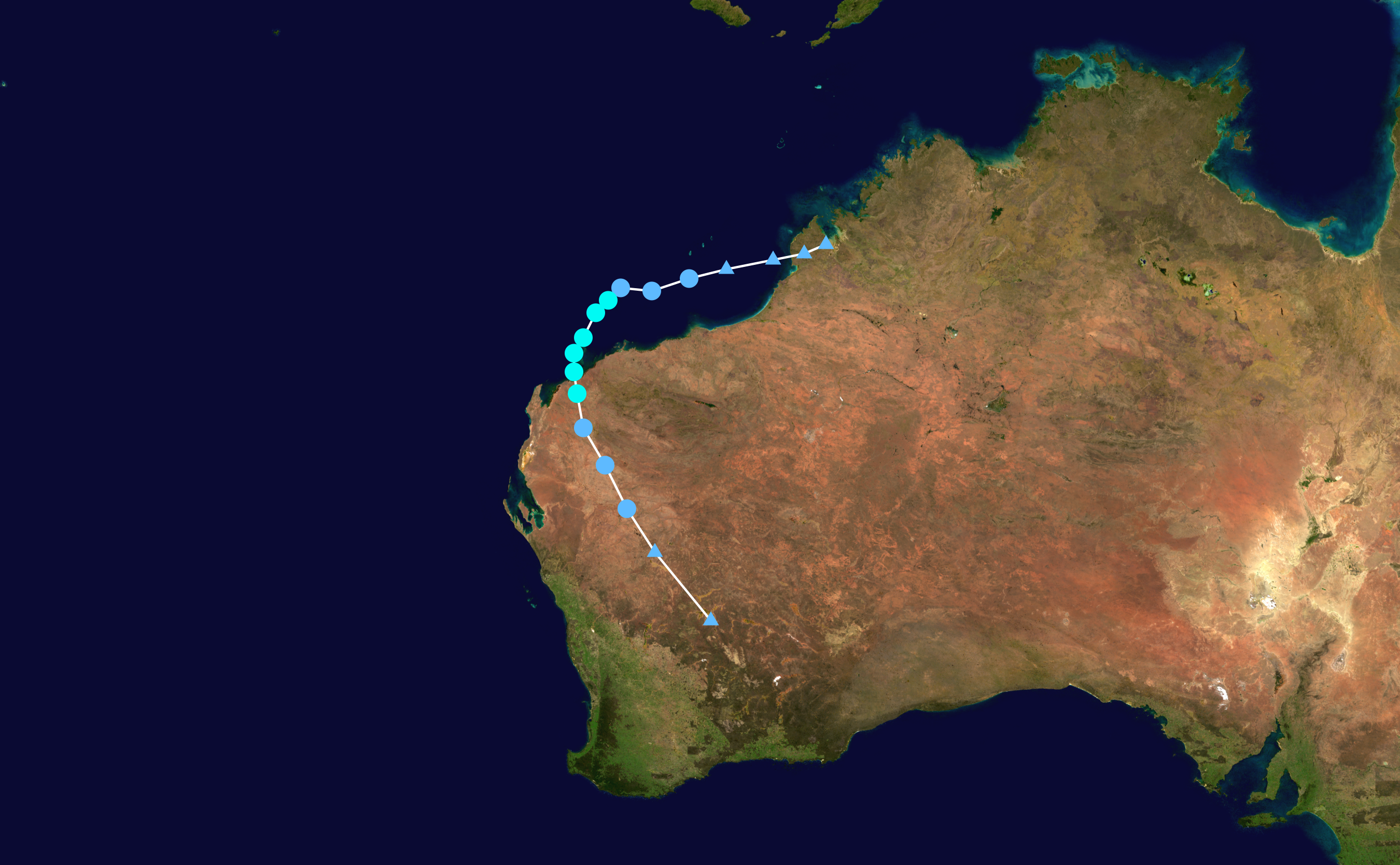
- Duration: 22 January – 27 January
- Peak intensity: 100 km/h (65 mph) (10-min); 976 hPa (mbar)

On 22 January, TCWC Perth noted that Tropical Low 08U had formed overland, to the north of Broome in North-West Australia. JTWC had upgrade this system become a significant tropical cyclone as "good". On 25 January at 11:15am (AWDT), TCWC Perth issued a Tropical Cyclone Warning for coastal areas from Wickham to Exmouth. Later that day, the JTWC issued a Tropical Cyclone Formation Alert as a tropical cyclone was likely to form within the following 48 hours. TCWC Perth begun issuing advisories for the developing tropical low and issued a tropical cyclone warning along the far western coastline of the Western Australia region. On 26 January, the system became Tropical Cyclone Dominic. Further intensification followed and Dominic was upgraded to a Category 2 cyclone several hours later. Morning of 27 January, Dominic made landfall just after 7am (AWDT) near Onslow. Later that day Dominic weakened to a Category 1 cyclone before weakening into a tropical low during the day. JTWC issued its last advisory on this system on 27 January as it continued to weaken inland.

The formation of Dominic in an area that produces significant amounts of oil resulted in numerous evacuations of offshore oil platforms. The platforms remained closed for several days until the storm dissipated, resulting in a loss of roughly 200,000 barrels (32,000 m^{3}) per day, increasing global gasoline prices. A red alert was declared for Onslow in preparations for the landfall of Dominic. A crane worker was killed in Port Hedland while dismantling a crane.

In Onslow, the roof of the local library was blown off, resulting in flooding within the building. A nearby hospital also sustained flood damage. Several trees and power lines were downed by high winds and some roads were flooded.

Following the storm, the shires of Ashburton, Carnarvon, Upper Gascoyne, Murchison, Yalgoo, Moora, Northam, York, Quairading and Beverley were eligible for disaster assistance from the Australian Government.

=== Tropical Cyclone Ellie ===
- Category 1 tropical cyclone (Australian scale)
- Tropical storm (SSHWS)
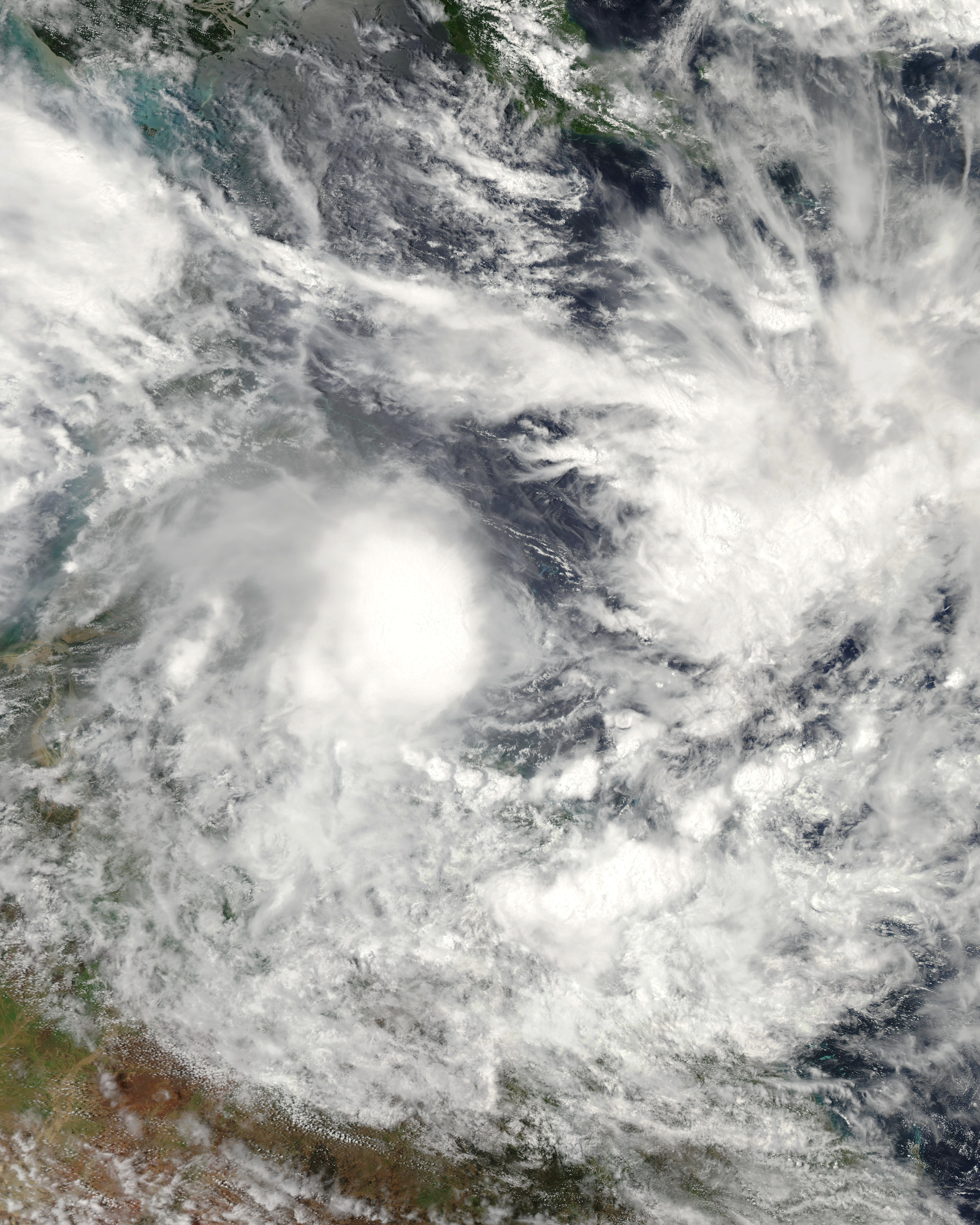
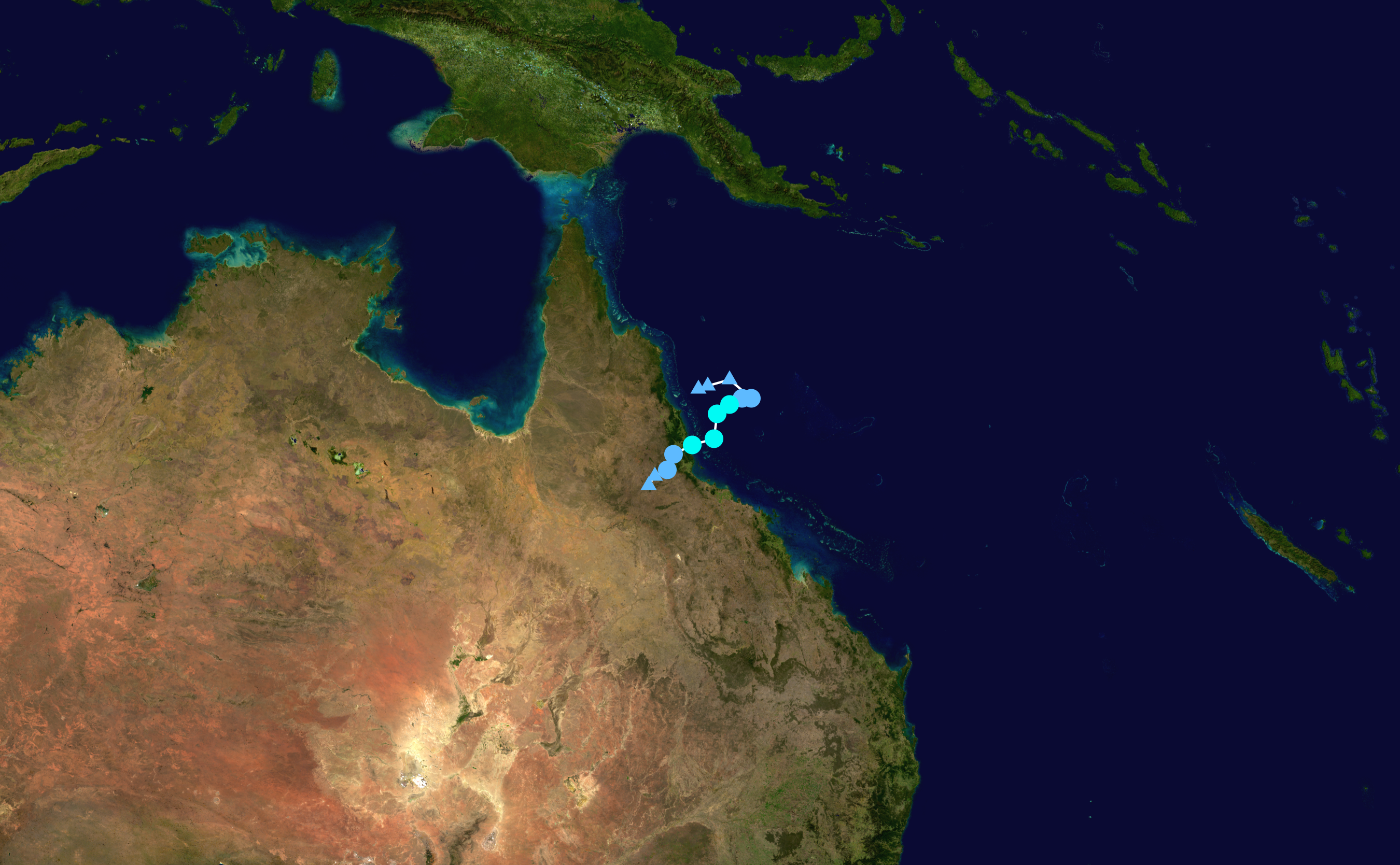
- Duration: 30 January – 4 February
- Peak intensity: 75 km/h (45 mph) (10-min); 988 hPa (mbar)

Early on 30 January, the TCWC in Brisbane noted that a Tropical Low, had formed within a monsoon trough. Later that day the JTWC, reported that multi spectral imagery had shown a developing low level circulation center with deep convection located over the western quadrant of the Low level circulation centre. Late the next day the Bureau of Meteorology reported that the low had intensified into a tropical cyclone and assigned the name of Ellie to the cyclone. They also reported that Ellie had reached its peak winds of 80 km/h, (50 mph), which made Ellie a Category one cyclone on the Australian Tropical Cyclone Intensity Scale. Later that day the Joint Typhoon Warning Center initiated issuing warnings on Ellie designating it as Tropical Cyclone 12P and also reported peak wind speeds of 75 km/h, (45 mph) which made Ellie equivalent to a Tropical Storm on the Saffir–Simpson Hurricane Scale. Ellie made landfall near Mission Beach at about Midnight AEST, 2 February (1400 UTC), as a Category 1 system and weakened into a Tropical Low. TCWC Brisbane was expecting Tropical Low ex-Ellie to move back over the Coral Sea within 24 to 36 hours after Ellie made landfall and possibly reintensify into a tropical cyclone. However, this did not happen. The low that had been Ellie redeveloped within the south eastern Gulf of Carpentaria. Torrential rain from the remnants of Ellie flooded areas in Northern Queensland, causing about A$110 million (US$69.5 million) in damages. In Ingham, between Cairns and Townsville, some 50 homes were flooded, with 32 people evacuated to emergency accommodation at a local high school.

=== Tropical Cyclone Freddy ===
- Category 1 tropical cyclone (Australian scale)
- Tropical storm (SSHWS)
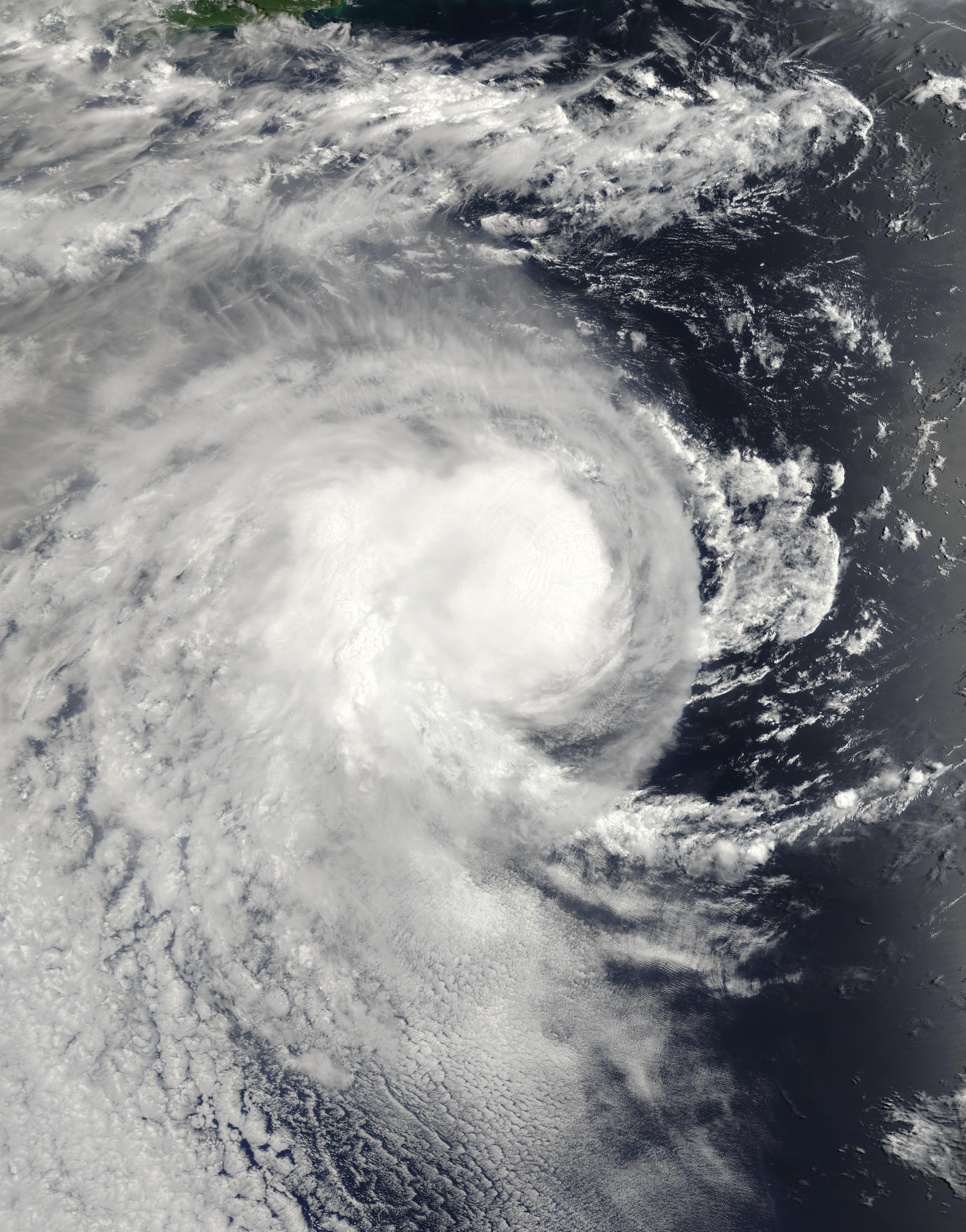
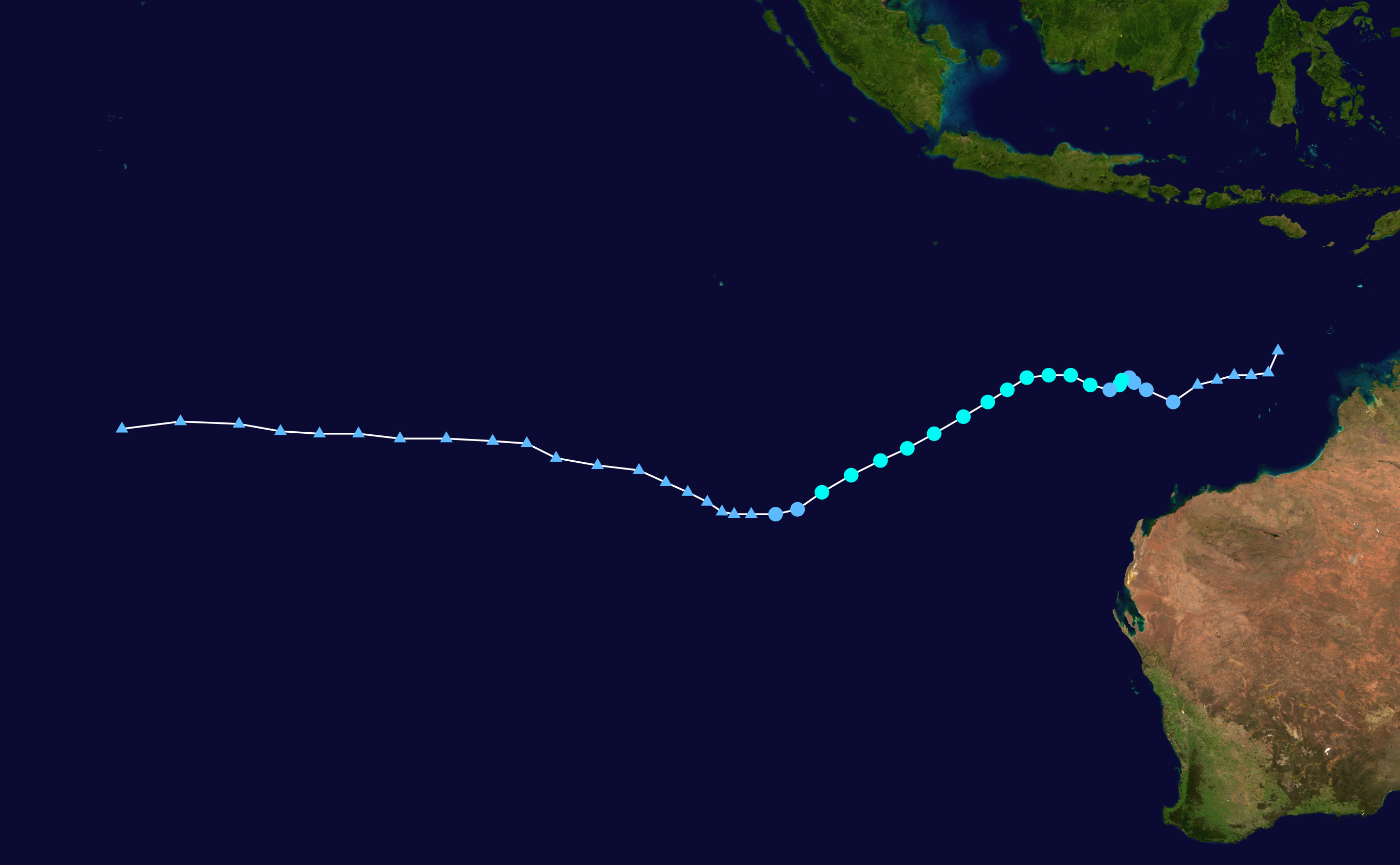
- Duration: 2 February – 10 February
- Peak intensity: 85 km/h (50 mph) (10-min); 992 hPa (mbar)

On 2 February, TCWC Perth noted that a Tropical Low had developed in the monsoon trough, which was located over the Kimberly region. On 3 February, at 03:45 WDT TCWC Perth issued a cyclone watch for the area between Kalumburu and Broome as the storm continued to move west winds intensified to 75 km/h and warning that the storm may develop into a cyclone later in the day. The system was located 500 km north west of Port Hedland on 5 February and was forecasted to continue moving westward into the Indian Ocean and strengthen into a cyclone although it was not expected to affect the West Australian coast line. On 6 February at 1200Z, the Joint Typhoon Warning Center identified the system as Tropical Cyclone 14S. Freddy tracked slowly south westward and steadily weakened as it was affected by more wind shear and cooler waters. The JTWC issued its final advisory on 9 February, as the system had dissipated. The outer bands of Freddy produced heavy rains in Indonesia. A landslide triggered by these rains killed two people.

=== Tropical Low 11U ===
- Tropical low (Australian scale)
- Duration: 4 February – 5 February
- Peak intensity: 45 km/h (30 mph) (10-min);

=== Tropical Low 12U ===
- Tropical low (Australian scale)
- Duration: 11 February – 17 February
- Peak intensity: <35 km/h (25 mph) (10-min);

=== Tropical Low 14U ===
- Tropical low (Australian scale)
- Duration: 23 February – 2 March
- Peak intensity: <35 km/h (25 mph) (10-min);

On 25 February, TCWC Darwin reported that a Tropical Low had developed within the monsoon trough west of Darwin, Northern Territory. JTWC forecasted the chance of this system becoming a tropical cyclone as "fair". The next early morning TCWC Perth begun issuing tropical cyclone advisories on the developing low, issuing a cyclone watch for the Pilbara coastal areas. On 26 February, JTWC upgraded the system's chances to "good" and issued a Tropical Cyclone Formation Alert. The low made landfall over Port Hedland without becoming a tropical cyclone.

The tropical low dropped upwards of 112 mm (4.4 in) of rain along the Pilbara coast, causing minor flooding. Flood warnings and watches were issued for areas around several rivers, due to the rains.

=== Tropical Low Gabrielle ===
- Tropical low (Australian scale)
- Tropical storm (SSHWS)
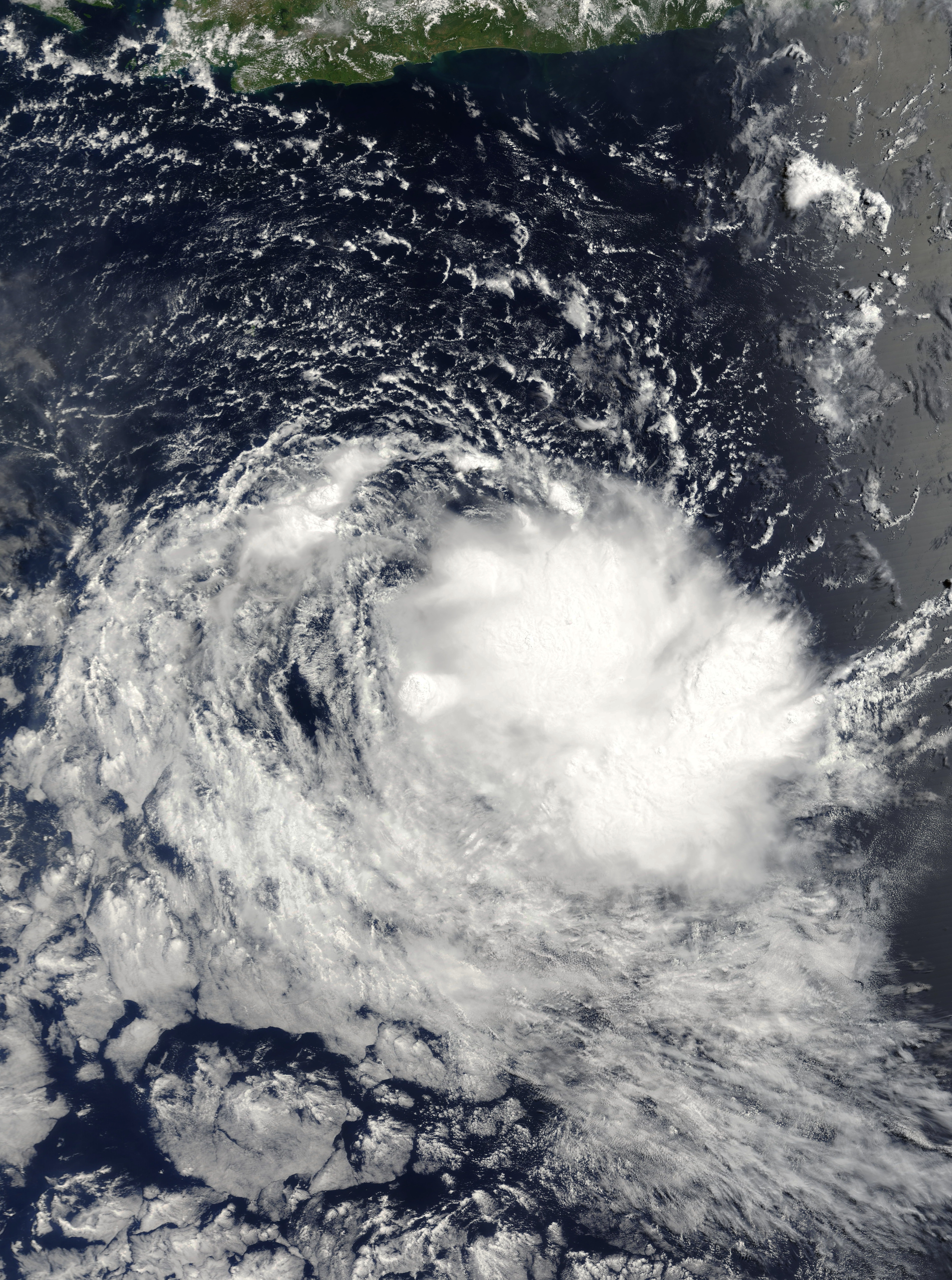
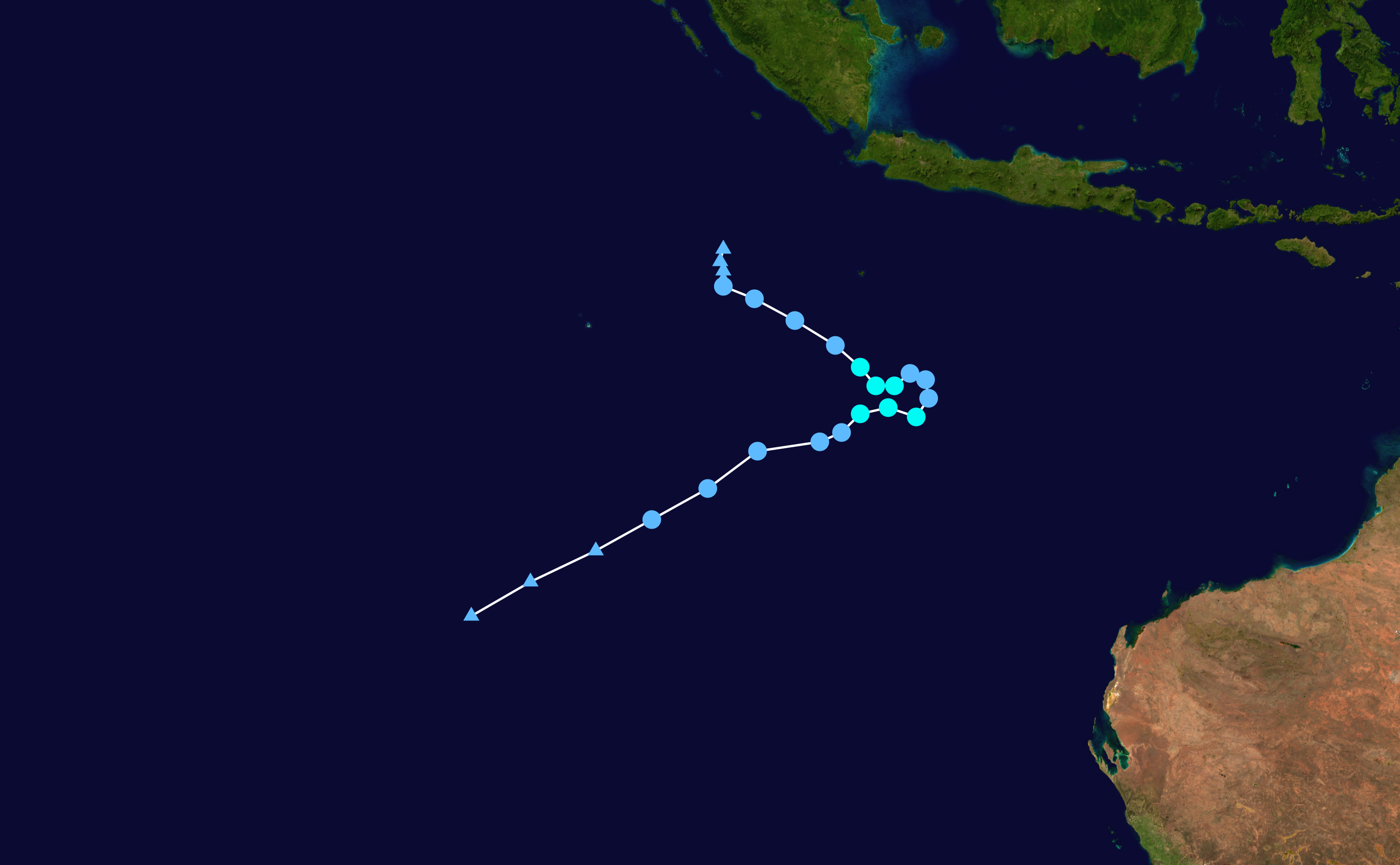
- Duration: 1 March – 5 March
- Peak intensity: 65 km/h (40 mph) (10-min); 996 hPa (mbar)

Gabrielle formed out of a low pressure system that quickly developed. It begin to move south east and soon weakened into a tropical low. It slowly tracked south and south westwardly, it slowly reintensified and gained tropical cyclone status. As an anticyclone possibly forming to the south of the system. This might have allowed the storm to strengthen a bit before dissipating over cooler waters later in the week, but it then unexpectedly turned the west and dissipated on 5 March.

Bureau of Meteorology in Perth noted that in post-analysis determined that Gabrielle did not meet the minimum requirements of a tropical cyclone by the Australian definition. Gales were observed in one quadrant or another throughout most of Gabrielle's life but at no one time did they extend more than halfway around the low level circulation center.

=== Severe Tropical Cyclone Hamish ===
- Category 5 severe tropical cyclone (Australian scale)
- Category 4 tropical cyclone (SSHWS)
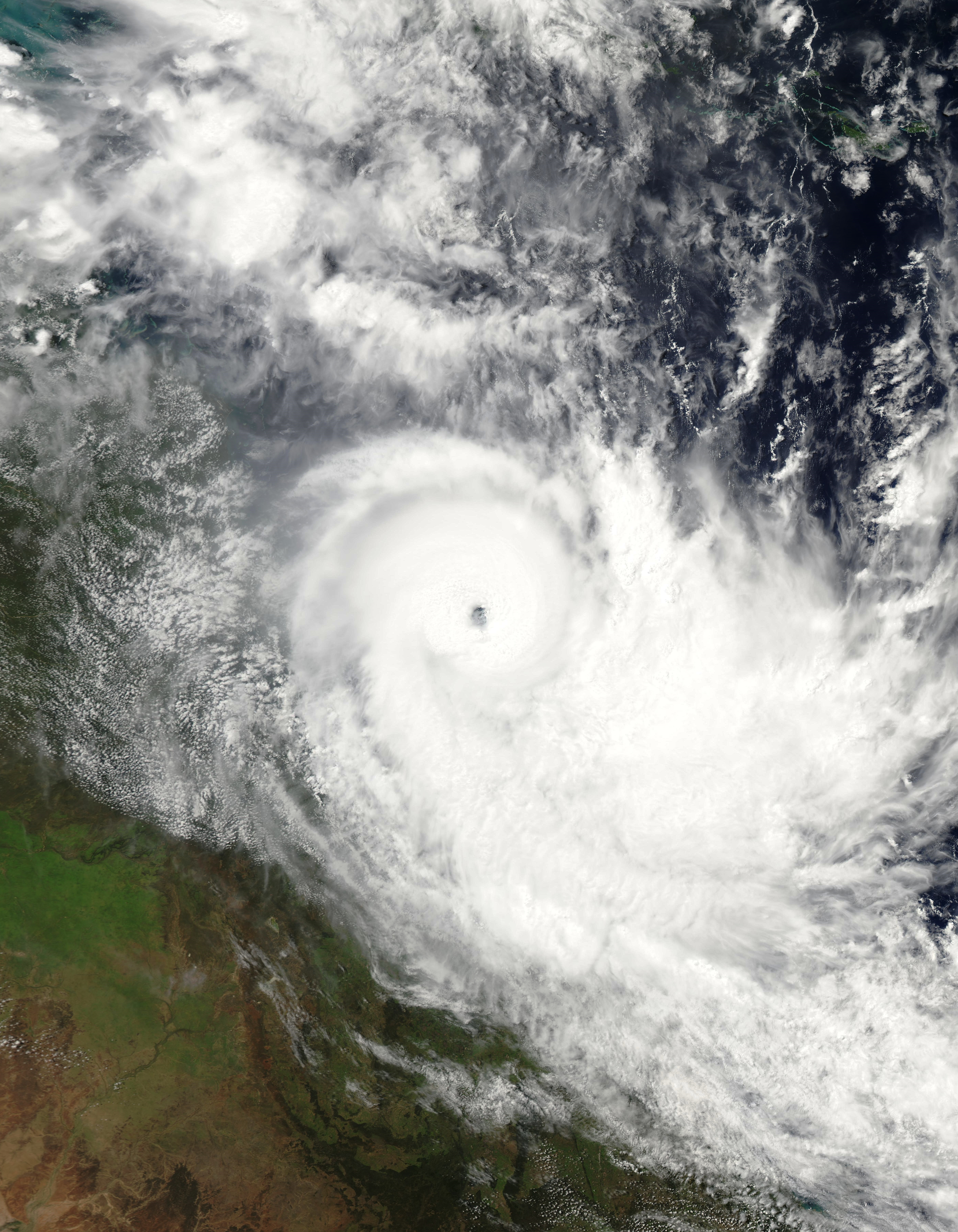
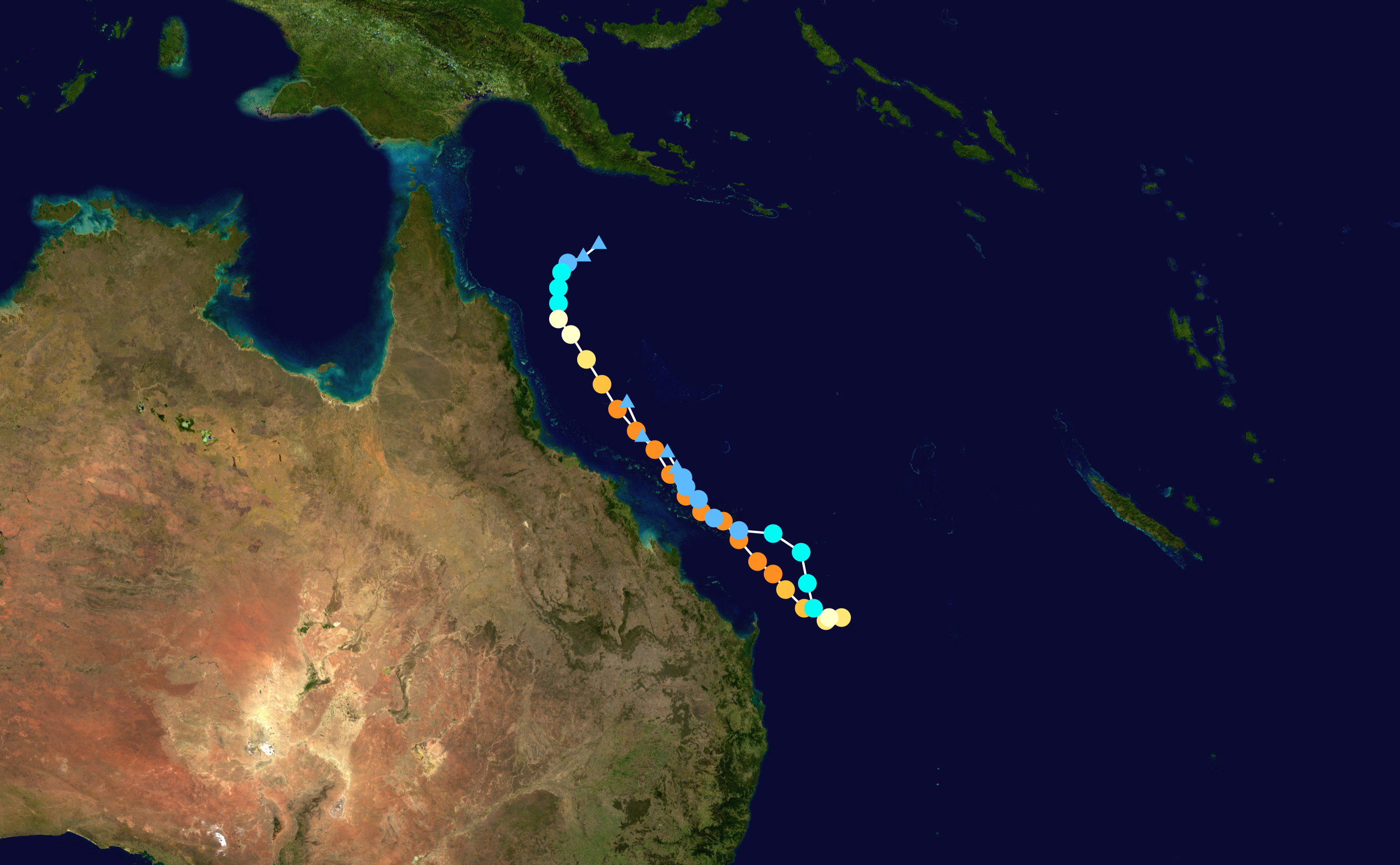
- Duration: 4 March – 11 March
- Peak intensity: 215 km/h (130 mph) (10-min); 924 hPa (mbar)

On 4 March, a weak Tropical Low developed in an active trough located over the north western Coral Sea slowly moving south east. The low began to intensify despite its proximity to land. At 11pm EST (1100 UTC), the Tropical Low developed into Tropical Cyclone Hamish and convective band begin to develop. The next day, the cyclone strengthened into a Category 2 cyclone, and by the 11pm advisory, had strengthen further to a Category 3 Severe Tropical Cyclone and a defined eye showed on the satellite. Later that day it begin to affect the north eastern parts of Queensland. On 7 March, Hamish was located approximately 230 kilometres from Cairns with the Bureau of Meteorology expecting Hamish to intensify into a Category 4 with the cyclone expecting to brush through near Mackay on Sunday night or Monday morning. during that day Hamish had intensified to a Category 4 cyclone. Later that day the storm intensified into a Category 5 cyclone, the first since Cyclone George, during its closest approach to Hayman Island. During 8 March, Severe Tropical Cyclone Hamish weakened to a Category 4 cyclone. The cyclone was forecasted to make landfall near Bundaberg however the Bureau of Meteorology then expected Hamish not to make landfall and to continue to move in a south easterly direction and slowly weaken. A trawler caught in rough seas produced by the storm sent out a distress signal as it was overcome by the storm. Rescue attempts to retrieve the three crew members were hampered by Hamish and were called off but expected to resume of 10 March. On 10 March 11am EST (0100 UTC) Hamish had weakened to a Category 3 cyclone with the Bureau of Meteorology is expected that Hamish slow and continue to weaken. On 11 March 7am EST (2100 UTC) the Hamish weakened further to a Category 2 cyclone with the Bureau of Meteorology expected Hamish to continually be slow moving and weaken, with the cyclone beginning to move in a north west direction later in the day. The storm continued to weaken and BoM downgraded it to a tropical low later that day.

=== Severe Tropical Cyclone Ilsa ===
- Category 4 severe tropical cyclone (Australian scale)
- Category 3 tropical cyclone (SSHWS)
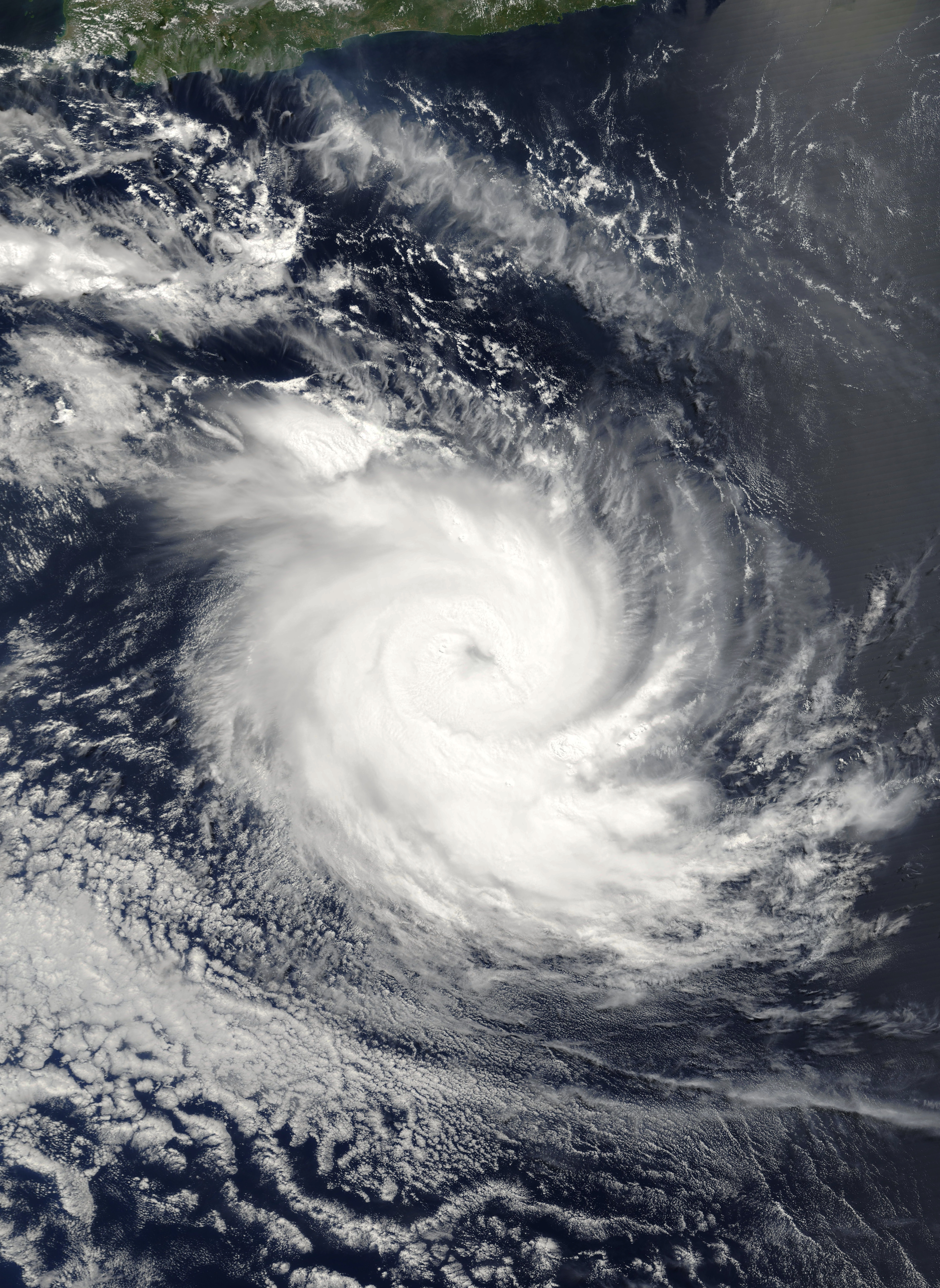
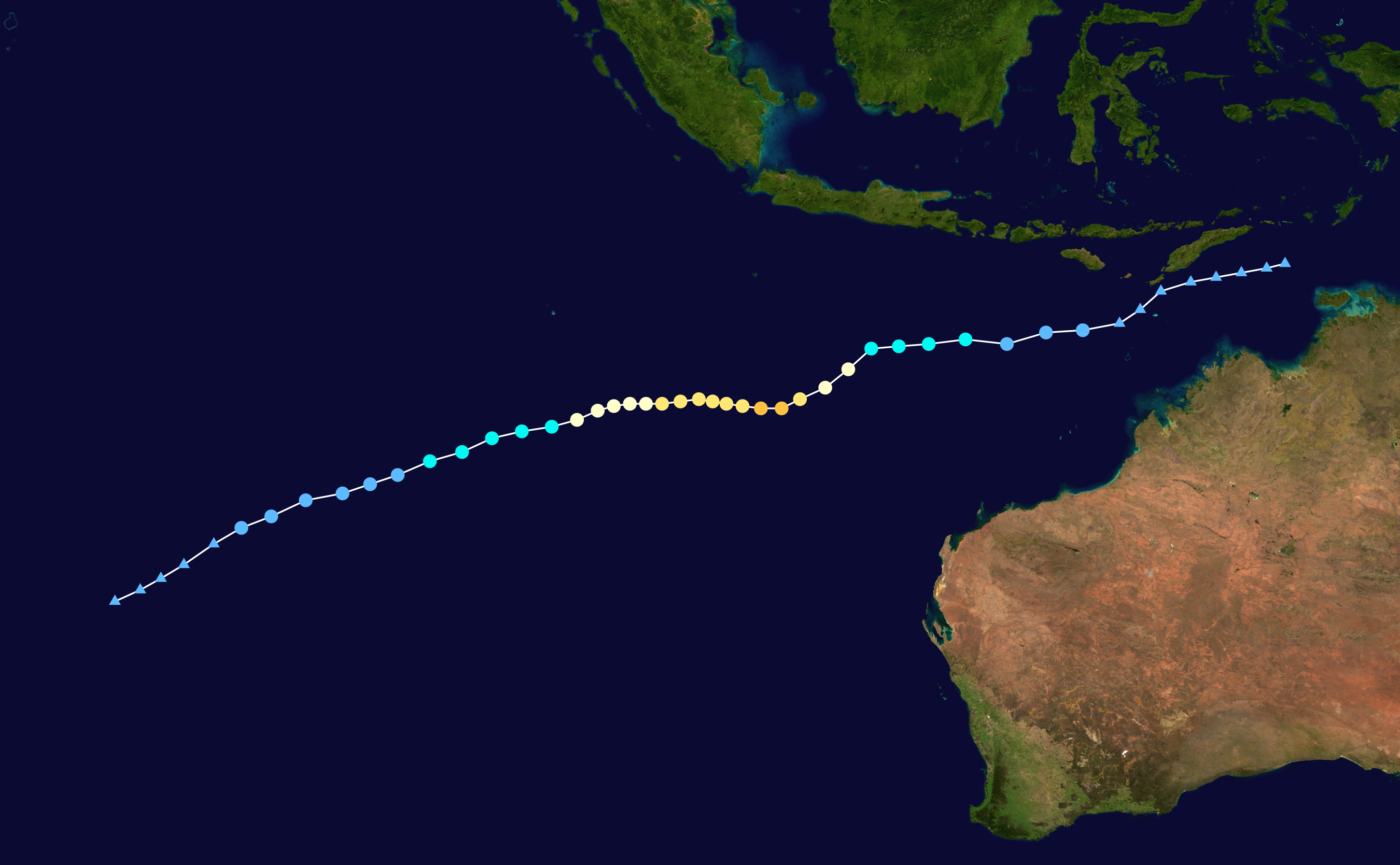
- Duration: 12 March – 27 March
- Peak intensity: 165 km/h (105 mph) (10-min); 958 hPa (mbar)

On 12 March, TCWC Darwin identified that a weak tropical low had formed in the Arafura Sea. On 17 March, TCWC Perth began issuing shipping warnings for the developing tropical low. The low developed into Tropical Cyclone Ilsa late on 17 March. Ilsa became a Category 3 Severe Tropical Cyclone on the evening of 19 March and continued to intensify, despite predictions that Ilsa would weaken. Ilsa quickly strengthened the next morning to a Category 4 cyclone, despite predictions that the cyclone would weaken before reaching that intensity. Steady weakening began soon after; Ilsa was downgraded to a Category 3 cyclone on 20 March, and to Category 1 on 23 March. On 24 March, the cyclone was downgraded to a tropical low and advisories were discontinued.

=== Tropical Low 19U ===
- Tropical low (Australian scale)
- Duration: 19 March – 20 March
- Peak intensity: 45 km/h (30 mph) (10-min); 999 hPa (mbar)

On 19 March, TCWC Brisbane identified that a weak tropical low had formed in the Coral Sea near 13S, 153E. Conditions remained unfavourable for development and the storm rapidly dissipated.

Forming in the same area as Cyclone Hamish did earlier in March, officials along the Sunshine Coast feared that it could track towards the disaster zones along the Queensland coast. The storm could hinder clean-up efforts of the large oil spill caused by Hamish. Another fear was that residents would panic upon hearing of another approaching cyclone, leading to unnecessary evacuations. Up to 68 mm (2.6 in) of rain fell in South Johnstone.

=== Tropical Cyclone Jasper ===
- Category 2 tropical cyclone (Australian scale)
- Tropical storm (SSHWS)
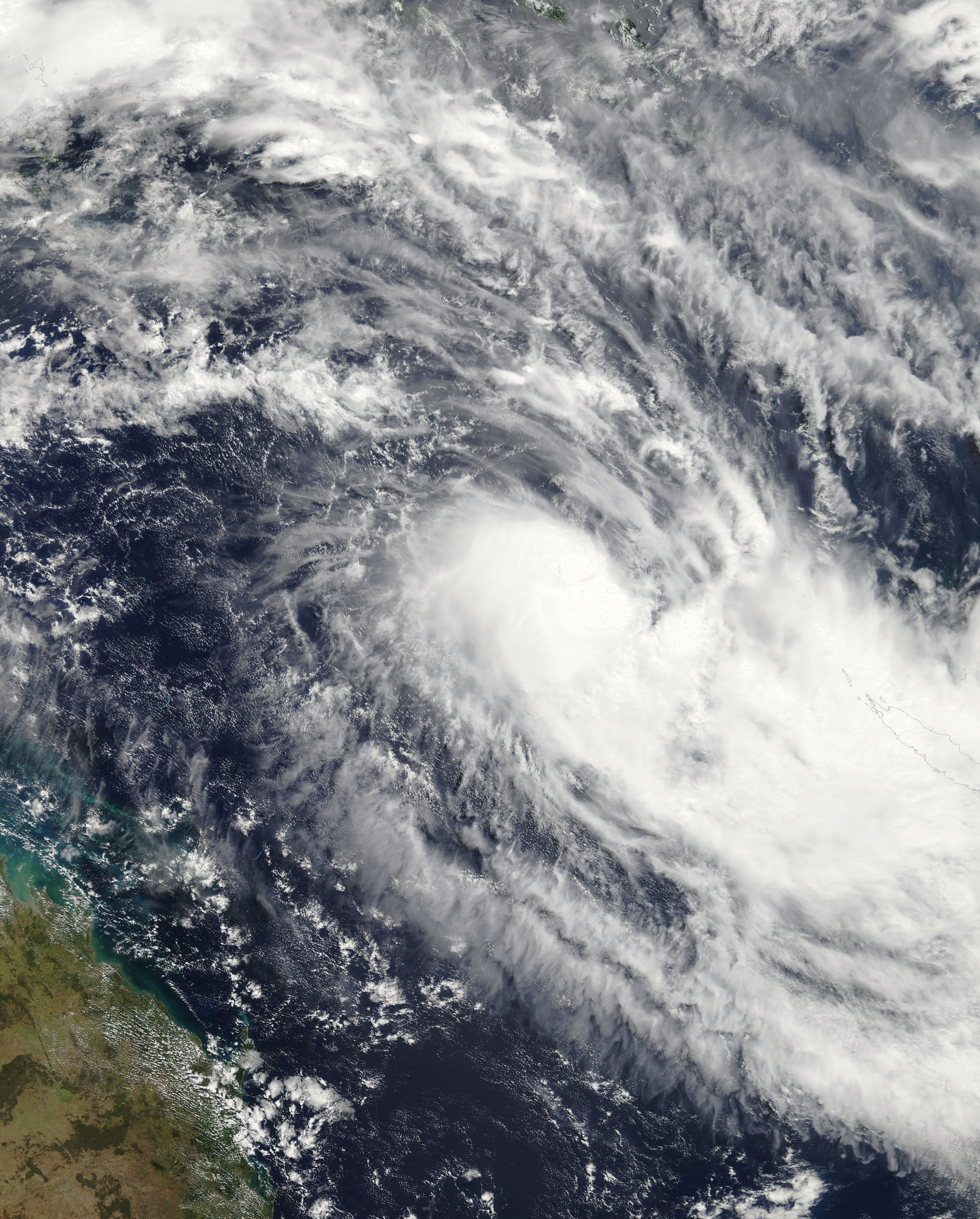
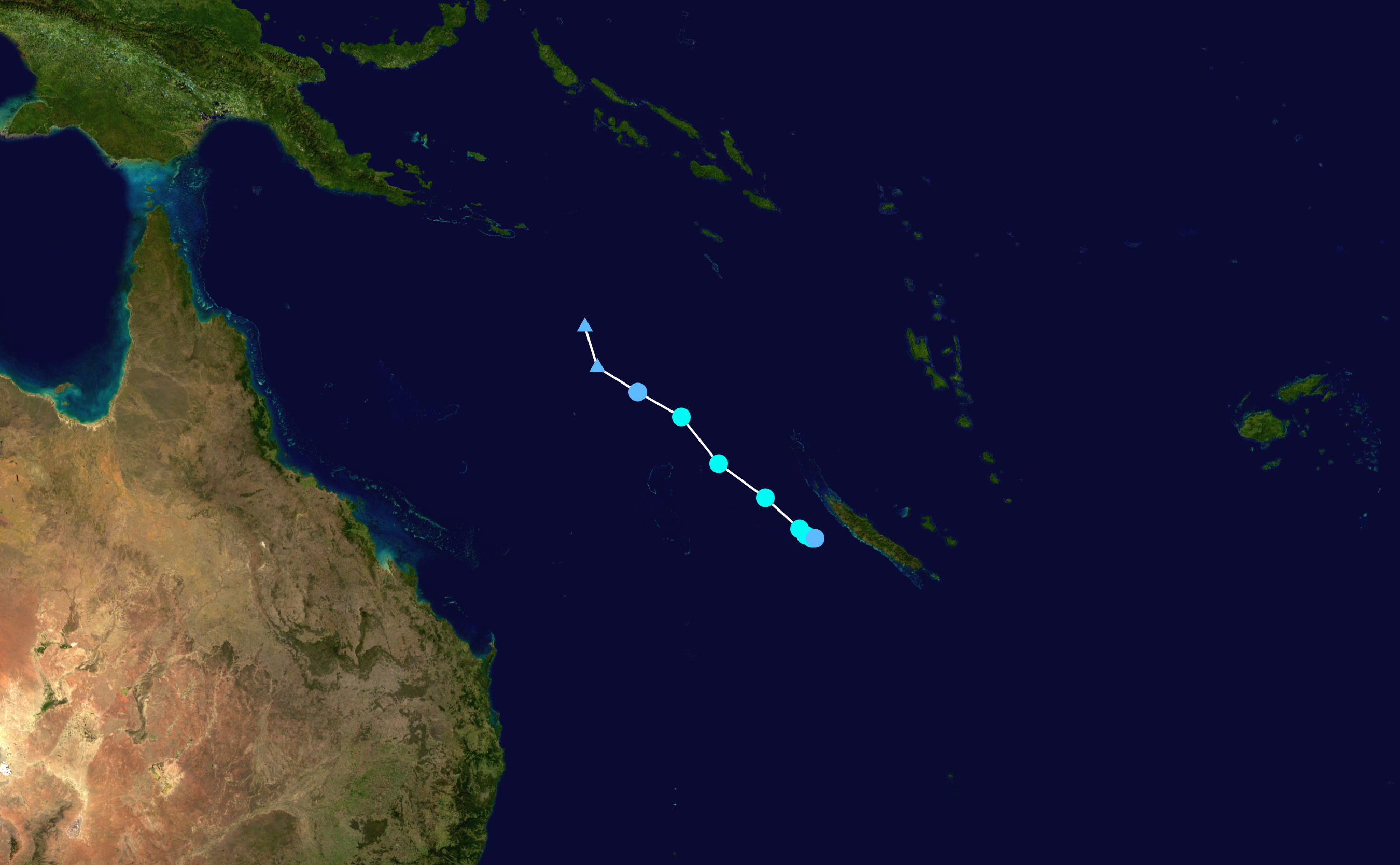
- Duration: 23 March – 24 March (exited basin)
- Peak intensity: 95 km/h (60 mph) (10-min); 985 hPa (mbar)

Early on 23 March the BoM started to monitor Tropical Low 20U that had developed within the monsoon trough, about 900 km (560 mi) to the northeast of Mackay in Queensland, Australia. The system subsequently moved southeastwards away from the Queensland coast, before it was named Jasper by the BoM later that day, after it had developed into a category 1 tropical cyclone. During the next day as the system approached 160°E and the South Pacific Basin, the JTWC initiated advisories on the system and assigned it the designation Tropical Cyclone 23P. As the system moved out of the basin the BoM reported that Jasper had peaked as a category 2 tropical cyclone with 10-minute sustained wind speeds of 95 km/h (60 mph).

=== Tropical Low 21U ===
- Tropical low (Australian scale)
- Duration: 23 March – 31 March
- Peak intensity: 55 km/h (35 mph) (10-min);

=== Tropical Low 22U (15F) ===
- Tropical low (Australian scale)
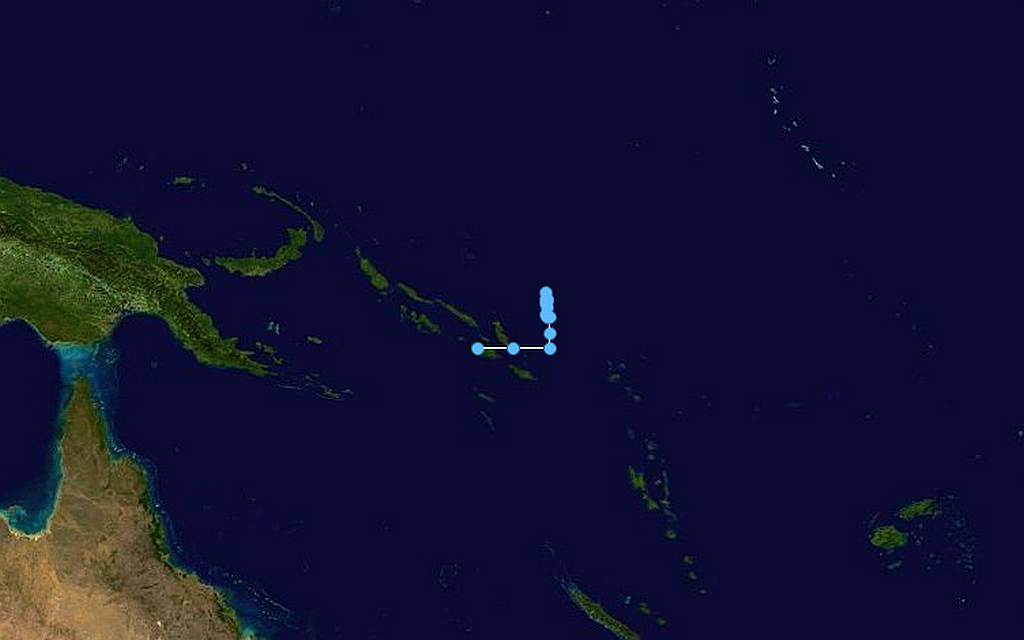
- Duration: 11 April (entered basin) – 13 April
- Peak intensity: 35 km/h (25 mph) (10-min); 1004 hPa (mbar)

Early on 11 April, Tropical Disturbance 15F moved into TCWC Brisbane's area of responsibility and was re-designated as Tropical Low 22U. Over the next couple of days, the disturbance remained weak as it moved towards the southern tip of Papua New Guinea. The tropical low then dissipated on 13 April.

=== Tropical Cyclone Kirrily ===
- Category 1 tropical cyclone (Australian scale)
- Tropical storm (SSHWS)
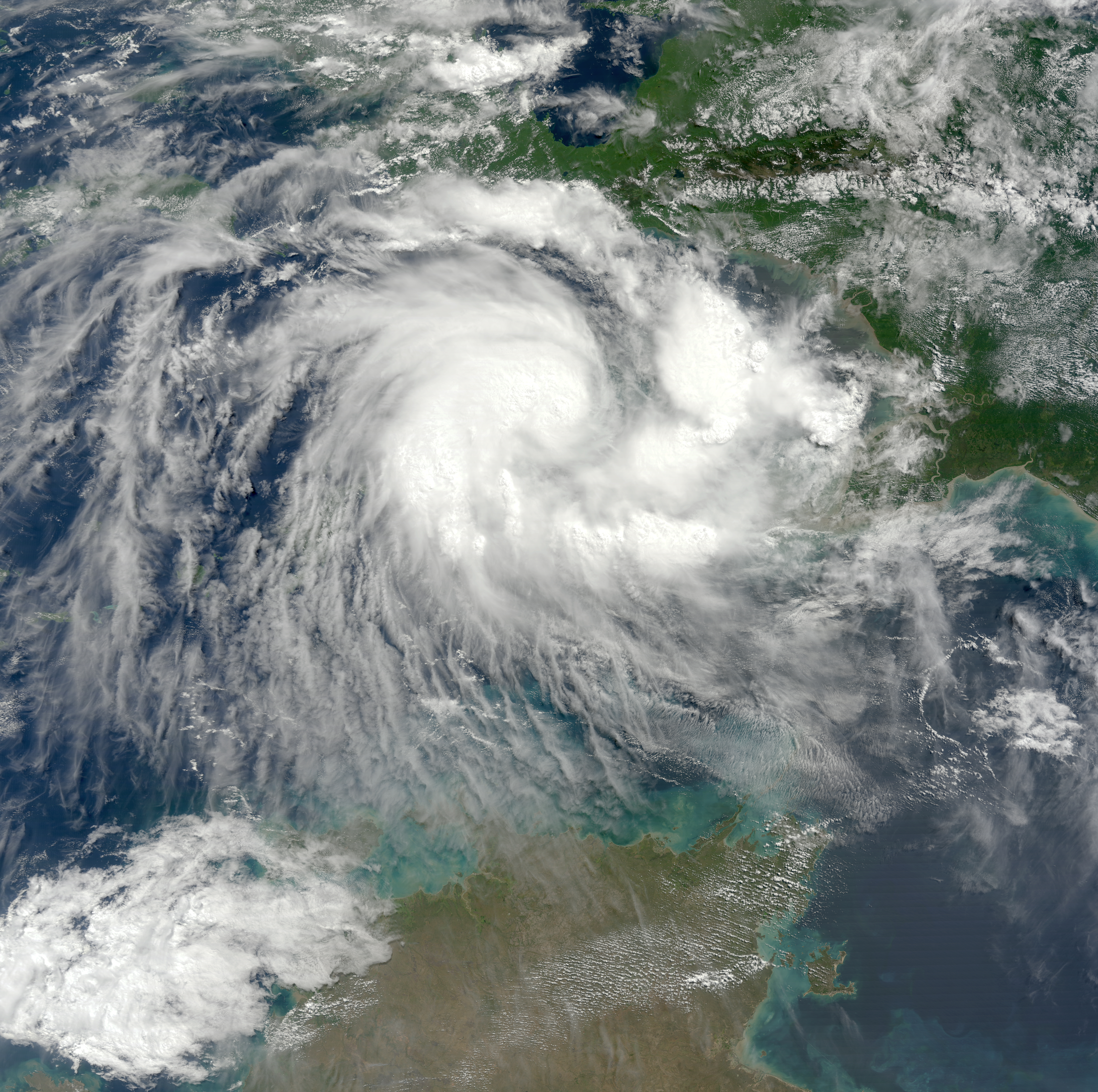
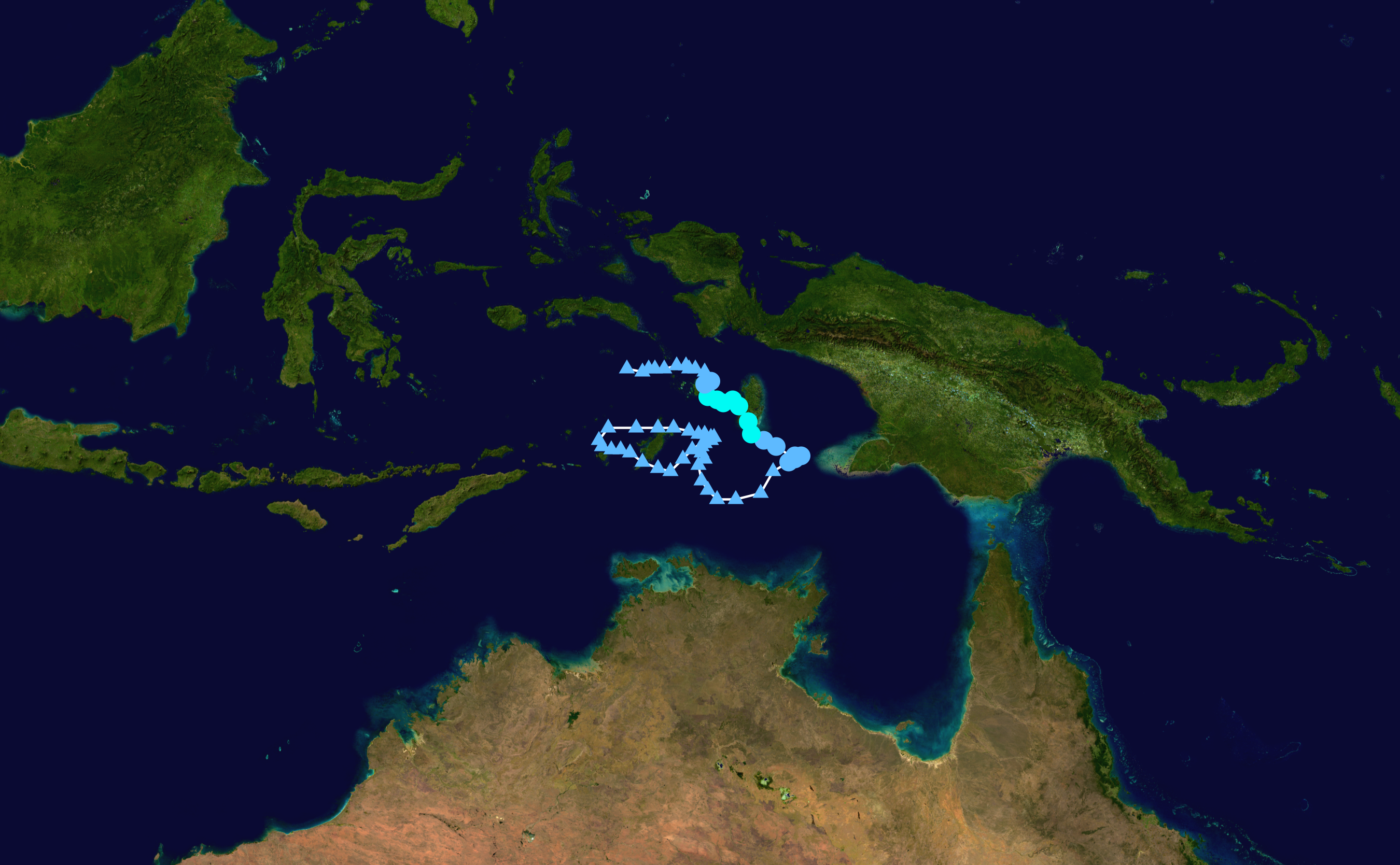
- Duration: 18 April – 1 May
- Peak intensity: 65 km/h (40 mph) (10-min); 999 hPa (mbar)

On 18 April, TCWC Darwin and TCWC Jakarta reported that a weak tropical low had developed within the Arafura Sea near the Tanimbar Islands. Over the next week, the low remained weak as it moved towards the eastwards, before it turned towards the northwest during 25 April. JTWC reported the system's chances forming into a significant Tropical Cyclone within 24 hours as "poor". Later on 26 April, JTWC upgraded the low's chances of forming from "poor" to "fair" and later in afternoon the low strengthened with JTWC upgrading the low from "fair" to "good" and issued a Tropical Cyclone Formation Alert. Joint Typhoon Warning Center designated the system as Tropical Cyclone 27S later on 27 April. In the afternoon, TCWC Darwin upgraded 23U to a Category 1 tropical cyclone and designated it as Tropical Cyclone Kirrily. Later that day, as it made landfall over Aru Islands, the low weakened slightly and JTWC downgraded Kirrily to tropical depression, and TCWC Darwin downgraded Kirrily to a tropical low. In the afternoon of the 27th, the JTWC again upgraded Kirrily into tropical storm. During 28 April the JTWC issued their final warning on Kirrily before the BoM downgraded the storm to a tropical low.

=== Tropical Low 24U ===
- Tropical low (Australian scale)
- Duration: 10 May – 18 May
- Peak intensity: Winds not specified; 1009 hPa (mbar)

On 10 May, TCWC Perth started monitoring on a tropical low over 07S 98E. The system meandered for several days, until it was last mentioned in TCWC Perth's outlooks on 18 May.

=== Other systems ===
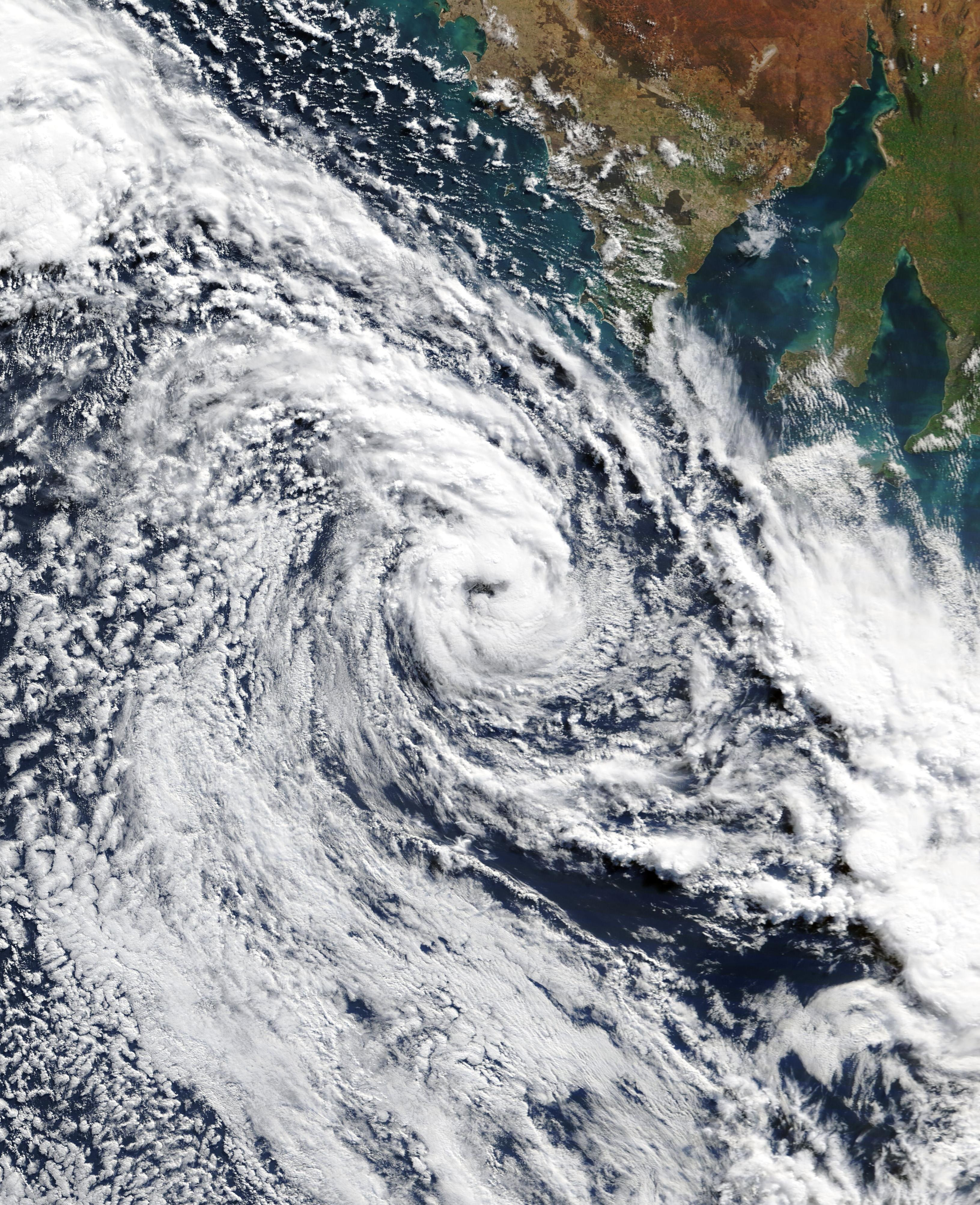
The subtropical storm on July 13

On 11 July, an extratropical low transitioned into a subtropical cyclone south of Australia. The subtropical low attained a minimum central pressure of 986 hPa along with estimated sustained wind speeds of 95 km/h (60 mph) shortly after subtropical transition. The low made landfall south of Adelaide on 14 July before dissipating the next day.

In addition to the subtropical storm included above, the remnants of Tropical Cyclones Bernard and Innis moved into the basin on 21 November and 18 February.

== Seasonal effects ==
Name	Dates	Peak intensity			Areas affected	Damages (AU$)	Damages (US$)	Deaths
Name	Dates	Category	Wind speed (km/h (mph))	Pressure (hPa)	Areas affected	Damages (AU$)	Damages (US$)	Deaths
Anika	17 – 22 November	Category 2 tropical cyclone	95 km/h (60 mph)	990 hPa (29.23 inHg)	Cocos Island	None	None	None
Billy	15 December – 5 January	Category 4 severe tropical cyclone	175 km/h (110 mph)	950 hPa (28.05 inHg)	North Western Australia			1
04U	22 – 24 December	Tropical low	45 km/h (30 mph)	1000 hPa (29.53 inHg)	Northern Territory	None	None	
05U	22 – 24 December	Tropical low	45 km/h (30 mph)	1003 hPa (29.62 inHg)	None	None	None	None
Charlotte	10 – 12 January	Category 1 tropical cyclone	85 km/h (50 mph)	986 hPa (29.12 inHg)	Northern Territory, Cape York Peninsular	$22 million	$15 million	
Dominic	24 – 27 January	Category 2 tropical cyclone	100 km/h (65 mph)	976 hPa (28.82 inHg)	Kimberley, Pilbara			
07U	25 – 26 January	Tropical low	35 km/h (25 mph)	1000 hPa (29.53 inHg)	None	None	None	None
09U	28 – 30 January	Tropical low	45 km/h (30 mph)	999 hPa (29.50 inHg)	None	None	None	None
Ellie	29 January – 4 February	Category 1 tropical cyclone	75 km/h (45 mph)	988 hPa (29.18 inHg)	Queensland	$110 million	$69.5 million	
Freddy	3 – 13 February	Category 1 tropical cyclone	85 km/h (50 mph)	992 hPa (29.29 inHg)	None	None	None	None
12U	11 – 17 February	Tropical low	<35 km/h (25 mph)	Not Specified	Western Australia			
14U	23 February – 2 March	Tropical low	<35 km/h (25 mph)	Not Specified	Western Australia			
Gabrielle	27 February – 6 March	Tropical low	65 km/h (40 mph)	996 hPa (29.41 inHg)	None	None	None	None
Hamish	4 – 11 March	Category 5 severe tropical cyclone	215 km/h (130 mph)	924 hPa (27.29 inHg)	Queensland	$60 million	$38.8 million	2
Ilsa	12 – 27 March	Category 4 severe tropical cyclone	165 km/h (105 mph)	958 hPa (28.29 inHg)				
19U	16 – 20 March	Tropical low	45 km/h (30 mph)	999 hPa (29.50 inHg)	None	None	None	None
Jasper	22 – 24 March	Category 2 tropical cyclone	95 km/h (60 mph)	985 hPa (29.09 inHg)	New Caledonia	None	None	None
21U	23 – 31 March	Tropical low	55 km/h (35 mph)	1002 hPa (29.59 inHg)	None	None	None	None
22U	4 – 11 April	Tropical low	35 km/h (25 mph)	1004 hPa (29.65 inHg)	None	None	None	None
Kirrily	18 April – 1 May	Category 1 tropical cyclone	75 km/h (45 mph)	998 hPa (29.47 inHg)	Indonesia	Minimal	Minimal	None
24U	10 – 18 May	Tropical low	35 km/h (25 mph)	1009 hPa (29.80 inHg)	None	None	None	None
Season aggregates
24 systems	18 November – 18 May		215 km/h (130 mph)	924 hPa (27.29 inHg)		$123 million	5	

=== Retirement ===
After the season, the name Hamish was retired by the World Meteorological Organization's RA V Tropical Cyclone Committee.

== See also ==
- List of Southern Hemisphere tropical cyclone seasons
- Atlantic hurricane seasons: 2008, 2009
- Pacific hurricane seasons: 2008, 2009
- Pacific typhoon seasons: 2008, 2009
- North Indian Ocean cyclone seasons: 2008, 2009
