= 32nd meridian =

32nd meridian may refer to:

- 32nd meridian east, a line of longitude east of the Greenwich Meridian
- 32nd meridian west, a line of longitude west of the Greenwich Meridian
- 32nd meridian west from Washington, a line of longitude west of the Washington Meridian
