= 33rd meridian =

33rd meridian may refer to:

- 33rd meridian east, a line of longitude east of the Greenwich Meridian
- 33rd meridian west, a line of longitude west of the Greenwich Meridian
