= 148th meridian east =

Longitude line

148th meridian east

The meridian 148° east of Greenwich is a line of longitude that extends from the North Pole across the Arctic Ocean, Asia, the Pacific Ocean, Australasia, the Southern Ocean, and Antarctica to the South Pole.

The 148th meridian east forms a great circle with the 32nd meridian west.

== From Pole to Pole ==
Starting at the North Pole and heading south to the South Pole, the 148th meridian east passes through:

Co-ordinates	Country, territory or sea	Notes
90°0′N 148°0′E	Arctic Ocean	
76°40′N 148°0′E	East Siberian Sea	
75°24′N 148°0′E	Russia	Sakha Republic — island of New Siberia
74°51′N 148°0′E	East Siberian Sea	
72°19′N 148°0′E	Russia	Sakha Republic; Magadan Oblast — from 63°56′N 148°0′E
59°23′N 148°0′E	Sea of Okhotsk	
45°20′N 148°0′E	Kuril Islands	Island of Iturup, administered by Russia (Sakhalin Oblast), but claimed by Japan (Hokkaidō Prefecture)
45°1′N 148°0′E	Pacific Ocean	Passing just west of the island of Nauna, Papua New Guinea (at 2°12′S 148°11′E); Passing just east of Rambutyo Island, Papua New Guinea (at 2°17′S 147°52′E); Bismarck Sea - passing just west of Sakar Island, Papua New Guinea (at 5°24′S 148°3′E)
5°33′S 148°0′E	Papua New Guinea	Umboi Island
5°50′S 148°0′E	Solomon Sea	
8°4′S 148°0′E	Papua New Guinea	Island of New Guinea
10°9′S 148°0′E	Pacific Ocean	Coral Sea — passing through Australia's Coral Sea Islands Territory
19°55′S 148°0′E	Australia	Queensland; New South Wales — from 29°0′S 148°0′E; Victoria — from 36°8′S 148°0′E
37°53′S 148°0′E	Pacific Ocean	Tasman Sea
39°38′S 148°0′E	Australia	Tasmania — Outer Sister Island, Flinders Island, Long Island and Cape Barren Island
40°25′S 148°0′E	Bass Strait	Passing just west of Clarke Island, Tasmania, Australia (at 40°32′S 148°5′E)
40°45′S 148°0′E	Australia	Tasmania
42°31′S 148°0′E	Pacific Ocean	Tasman Sea — passing just west of Maria Island, Tasmania, Australia (at 42°39′S 148°1′E)
43°13′S 148°0′E	Australia	Tasmania — Tasman Peninsula
43°15′S 148°0′E	Pacific Ocean	
60°0′S 148°0′E	Southern Ocean	
67°48′S 148°0′E	Antarctica	Australian Antarctic Territory, claimed by Australia
68°17′S 148°0′E	Southern Ocean	Buckley Bay
68°25′S 148°0′E	Antarctica	Australian Antarctic Territory, claimed by Australia

== See also ==
- 147th meridian east
- 149th meridian east
