= 31st meridian =

31st meridian may refer to:

- 31st meridian east, a line of longitude east of the Greenwich Meridian
- 31st meridian west, a line of longitude west of the Greenwich Meridian
