= 146th meridian east =

Line of longitude

146th meridian east (interactive map)

The meridian 146° east of Greenwich is a line of longitude that extends from the North Pole across the Arctic Ocean, Asia, the Pacific Ocean, Australasia, the Indian Ocean, the Southern Ocean, and Antarctica to the South Pole.

The 146th meridian east forms a great circle with the 34th meridian west.

== From Pole to Pole ==
Starting at the North Pole and heading south to the South Pole, the 146th meridian east passes through:

Co-ordinates	Country, territory or sea	Notes
90°0′N 146°0′E	Arctic Ocean	
76°34′N 146°0′E	East Siberian Sea	Passing just east of the island of Kotelny, Sakha Republic, Russia (at 75°30′N 145°24′E); Passing just west of the island of New Siberia, Sakha Republic, Russia (at 75°13′N 146°10′E)
72°30′N 146°0′E	Russia	Sakha Republic; Magadan Oblast — from 63°54′N 146°0′E; Khabarovsk Krai — from 61°58′N 146°0′E; Magadan Oblast — from 60°40′N 146°0′E; Khabarovsk Krai — from 60°12′N 146°0′E
59°8′N 146°0′E	Sea of Okhotsk	
44°21′N 146°0′E	Kuril Islands	Kunashir Island, administered by Russia (Sakhalin Oblast), but claimed by Japan (Hokkaidō Prefecture)
44°10′N 146°0′E	Pacific Ocean	
43°23′N 146°0′E	Kuril Islands	Habomai islands, administered by Russia (Sakhalin Oblast) but claimed by Japan (Hokkaidō Prefecture)
43°22′N 146°0′E	Pacific Ocean	Passing just east of Pagan, Northern Mariana Islands (at 18°8′N 145°49′E); Passing just east of Alamagan, Northern Mariana Islands (at 17°36′N 145°50′E); Passing just east of Guguan, Northern Mariana Islands (at 17°19′N 145°51′E); Passing just east of Sarigan, Northern Mariana Islands (at 16°42′N 145°47′E); Passing just west of Farallon de Medinilla, Northern Mariana Islands (at 16°0′N 146°3′E); Passing just east of Saipan, Northern Mariana Islands (at 15°16′N 145°50′E)
1°45′S 146°0′E	Bismarck Sea	
4°31′S 146°0′E	Papua New Guinea	Karkar Island
4°44′S 146°0′E	Bismarck Sea	
5°30′S 146°0′E	Papua New Guinea	
8°3′S 146°0′E	Coral Sea	
16°55′S 146°0′E	Australia	Queensland — Fitzroy Island
16°56′S 146°0′E	Coral Sea	
17°17′S 146°0′E	Australia	Queensland; New South Wales — from 29°0′S 146°0′E; Victoria — from 36°1′S 146°0′E
38°53′S 146°0′E	Bass Strait	
41°5′S 146°0′E	Australia	Tasmania
43°26′S 146°0′E	Indian Ocean	Australian authorities consider this to be part of the Southern Ocean
60°0′S 146°0′E	Southern Ocean	
66°50′S 146°0′E	Antarctica	Australian Antarctic Territory, claimed by Australia
67°21′S 146°0′E	Southern Ocean	
67°36′S 146°0′E	Antarctica	Australian Antarctic Territory, claimed by Australia

== See also ==
- 145th meridian east
- 147th meridian east
