= 147th meridian east =

Line of longitude

147th meridian east (interactive map)

The meridian 147° east of Greenwich is a line of longitude that extends from the North Pole across the Arctic Ocean, Asia, the Pacific Ocean, Australasia, the Southern Ocean, and Antarctica to the South Pole.

The 147th meridian east forms a great circle with the 33rd meridian west.

== From Pole to Pole ==
Starting at the North Pole and heading south to the South Pole, the 147th meridian east passes through:

Co-ordinates	Country, territory or sea	Notes
90°0′N 147°0′E	Arctic Ocean	
76°37′N 147°0′E	East Siberian Sea	
75°19′N 147°0′E	Russia	Sakha Republic — island of New Siberia
75°3′N 147°0′E	East Siberian Sea	
72°14′N 147°0′E	Russia	Sakha Republic; Magadan Oblast — from 64°8′N 147°0′E
59°22′N 147°0′E	Sea of Okhotsk	
44°35′N 147°0′E	Kuril Islands	Island of Iturup, administered by Russia (Sakhalin Oblast), but claimed by Japan (Hokkaidō Prefecture)
44°27′N 147°0′E	Pacific Ocean	Passing just east of Shikotan island, Kuril Islands (at 43°50′N 146°55′E); Passing just west of Satawal island, Federated States of Micronesia (at 7°21′N 147°2′E)
1°58′S 147°0′E	Papua New Guinea	Manus Island
2°12′S 147°0′E	Pacific Ocean	Bismarck Sea
5°15′S 147°0′E	Papua New Guinea	Long Island
5°22′S 147°0′E	Pacific Ocean	Bismarck Sea
5°56′S 147°0′E	Papua New Guinea	
6°44′S 147°0′E	Solomon Sea	Huon Gulf
7°0′S 147°0′E	Papua New Guinea	
9°18′S 147°0′E	Coral Sea	
19°15′S 147°0′E	Australia	Queensland; New South Wales — from 29°0′S 147°0′E; Victoria — from 36°5′S 147°0′E
38°32′S 147°0′E	Bass Strait	Passing just east of Hogan Island, Tasmania, Australia (at 39°13′S 146°59′E)
40°59′S 147°0′E	Australia	Tasmania
43°26′S 147°0′E	Pacific Ocean	Australian authorities consider this to be part of the Southern Ocean
60°0′S 147°0′E	Southern Ocean	
67°54′S 147°0′E	Antarctica	Australian Antarctic Territory, claimed by Australia

== See also ==
- 146th meridian east
- 148th meridian east
