= 150th meridian east =

Line of longitude

150th meridian east (interactive map)

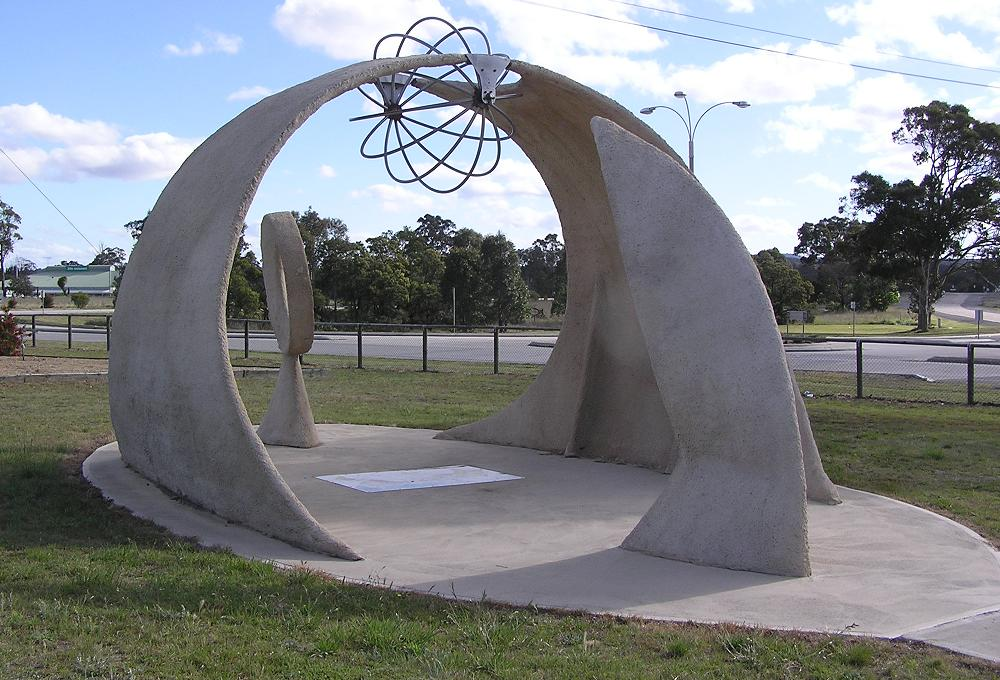
150° monument in Marulan, New South Wales

The meridian 150° east of Greenwich is a line of longitude that extends from the North Pole across the Arctic Ocean, Asia, the Pacific Ocean, Australasia, the Southern Ocean, and Antarctica to the South Pole.

The 150th meridian east forms a great ellipse with the 30th meridian west.

This is the exact middle of the World Time Zone UTC+10:00, where the sun rises at approximately 6am and sets at 6pm every equinox.

== From Pole to Pole ==
Starting at the North Pole and heading south to the South Pole, the 150th meridian east passes through:

Co-ordinates	Country, territory or sea	Notes
90°0′N 150°0′E	Arctic Ocean	
76°46′N 150°0′E	East Siberian Sea	
75°12′N 150°0′E	Russia	Sakha Republic — New Siberia Island
74°48′N 150°0′E	East Siberian Sea	
71°59′N 150°0′E	Russia	Sakha Republic; Magadan Oblast — from 64°30′N 150°0′E
59°41′N 150°0′E	Sea of Okhotsk	
46°2′N 150°0′E	Russia	Sakhalin Oblast — island of Urup, Kuril Islands
45°49′N 150°0′E	Pacific Ocean	
8°54′N 150°0′E	Federated States of Micronesia	Namonuito Atoll
8°33′N 150°0′E	Pacific Ocean	
1°40′S 150°0′E	Papua New Guinea	Emirau Island
1°41′S 150°0′E	Pacific Ocean	Bismarck Sea
2°27′S 150°0′E	Papua New Guinea	New Hanover Island
2°31′S 150°0′E	Pacific Ocean	Bismarck Sea
5°8′S 150°0′E	Papua New Guinea	Island of New Britain
6°18′S 150°0′E	Solomon Sea	
9°38′S 150°0′E	Papua New Guinea	Island of New Guinea
9°44′S 150°0′E	Solomon Sea	Goodenough Bay
10°5′S 150°0′E	Papua New Guinea	Island of New Guinea
10°36′S 150°0′E	Pacific Ocean	Coral Sea — passing just east of Willis Island in the Coral Sea Islands Territory (at 16°17′S 149°58′E)
22°6′S 150°0′E	Australia	Queensland; New South Wales — from 28°35′S 150°0′E, passing through Marulan (at 34°43′S 150°0′E)
36°41′S 150°0′E	Pacific Ocean	
37°9′S 150°0′E	Australia	New South Wales — Green Cape
37°15′S 150°0′E	Pacific Ocean	
60°0′S 150°0′E	Southern Ocean	
68°26′S 150°0′E	Antarctica	Australian Antarctic Territory, claimed by Australia

== See also ==
- 149th meridian east
- 151st meridian east
