= 33rd meridian west =

Line of longitude

33rd meridian west

The meridian 33° west of Greenwich is a line of longitude that extends from the North Pole across the Arctic Ocean, Greenland, the Atlantic Ocean, the Southern Ocean, and Antarctica to the South Pole.

The 33rd meridian west forms a great circle with the 147th meridian east.

== From Pole to Pole ==
Starting at the North Pole and heading south to the South Pole, the 33rd meridian west passes through:

| Co-ordinates | Country, territory or sea | Notes |
|---|---|---|
| 90°0′N 33°0′W | Arctic Ocean | |
| 83°37′N 33°0′W | Greenland | |
| 67°41′N 33°0′W | Atlantic Ocean | |
| 60°0′S 33°0′W | Southern Ocean | |
| 77°8′S 33°0′W | Antarctica | Claimed by both Argentina (Argentine Antarctica) and United Kingdom (British Antarctic Territory) |

== See also ==
- 32nd meridian west
- 34th meridian west
