= Buckley Bay (Antarctica) =

Bay in Antarctica

Coordinates: 68°22′S 148°20′E

Buckley Bay is an embayment formed between the east side of the Ninnis Glacier Tongue and the mainland of Antarctica. It was discovered by the Australasian Antarctic Expedition (1911–1914) under Douglas Mawson, who named it for George Buckley of New Zealand, a patron of the expedition.
