= 149th meridian east =

Line of longitude

149th meridian east

The meridian 149° east of Greenwich is a line of longitude that extends from the North Pole across the Arctic Ocean, Asia, the Pacific Ocean, Australasia, the Southern Ocean, and Antarctica to the South Pole.

The 149th meridian east forms a great circle with the 31st meridian west.

== From Pole to Pole ==
Starting at the North Pole and heading south to the South Pole, the 149th meridian east passes through:

Co-ordinates	Country, territory or sea	Notes
90°0′N 149°0′E	Arctic Ocean	
76°44′N 149°0′E	Russia	Sakha Republic — Bennett Island
76°39′N 149°0′E	East Siberian Sea	
75°13′N 149°0′E	Russia	Sakha Republic — island of New Siberia
74°43′N 149°0′E	East Siberian Sea	
72°14′N 149°0′E	Russia	Sakha Republic; Magadan Oblast — from 64°26′N 149°0′E
59°27′N 149°0′E	Sea of Okhotsk	Taui Bay
59°10′N 149°0′E	Russia	Magadan Oblast — Spafaryev Island
59°7′N 149°0′E	Sea of Okhotsk	Passing just east of Iturup in the Kuril Islands (at 45°30′N 148°53′E), administered by Russia (Sakhalin Oblast), but claimed by Japan (Hokkaidō Prefecture)
45°30′N 149°0′E	Pacific Ocean	Passing just west of the island of Narage, Papua New Guinea (at 4°32′S 149°6′E); Passing just west of the island of Unea, Papua New Guinea (at 4°53′S 149°6′E)
5°28′S 149°0′E	Papua New Guinea	Island of New Britain; Arawe Islands — from 6°1′S 149°0′E
6°9′S 149°0′E	Solomon Sea	
9°3′S 149°0′E	Papua New Guinea	Island of New Guinea
10°16′S 149°0′E	Pacific Ocean	Coral Sea — passing through Australia's Coral Sea Islands Territory
20°14′S 149°0′E	Australia	Queensland — Whitsunday Island
20°19′S 149°0′E	Pacific Ocean	Coral Sea
20°55′S 149°0′E	Australia	Queensland; New South Wales — from 28°58′S 149°0′E; Australian Capital Territory — from 35°12′S 149°0′E, passing just west of Canberra (at 35°20′S 149°7′E); New South Wales — from 35°54′S 149°0′E; Victoria — from 37°7′S 149°0′E
37°47′S 149°0′E	Pacific Ocean	
60°0′S 149°0′E	Southern Ocean	
68°21′S 149°0′E	Antarctica	Australian Antarctic Territory, claimed by Australia

== See also ==
- 148th meridian east
- 150th meridian east
