= 32nd meridian west =

Line of longitude

32nd meridian west

The meridian 32° west of Greenwich is a line of longitude that extends from the North Pole across the Arctic Ocean, Greenland, the Atlantic Ocean, the Southern Ocean, and Antarctica to the South Pole.

The 32nd meridian west forms a great circle with the 148th meridian east.

== From Pole to Pole ==
Starting at the North Pole and heading south to the South Pole, the 32nd meridian west passes through:

Co-ordinates	Country, territory or sea	Notes
90°0′N 32°0′W	Arctic Ocean	
83°36′N 32°0′W	Greenland	Northern Peary Land
83°3′N 32°0′W	Frederick E. Hyde Fjord	
82°59′N 32°0′W	Greenland	Southern Peary Land
81°54′N 32°0′W	Independence Fjord	
81°44′N 32°0′W	Greenland	
39°27′N 32°0′W	Atlantic Ocean	Passing just west of Flores Island, Portugal
60°0′S 32°0′W	Atlantic Ocean	Passing just east of the Fernando de Noronha islands, Brazil (at 3°50′S 32°23′W)
60°0′S 32°0′W	Southern Ocean	
77°2′S 32°0′W	Antarctica	Claimed by both Argentina (Argentine Antarctica) and United Kingdom (British Antarctic Territory)

== See also ==
- 31st meridian west
- 33rd meridian west
