= 34th meridian west =

Line of longitude

34th meridian west

The meridian 34° west of Greenwich is a line of longitude that extends from the North Pole across the Arctic Ocean, Greenland, the Atlantic Ocean, the Southern Ocean, and Antarctica to the South Pole.

The 34th meridian west forms a great circle with the 146th meridian east.

== From Pole to Pole ==
Starting at the North Pole and heading south to the South Pole, the 34th meridian west passes through:

Co-ordinates	Country, territory or sea	Notes
90°0′N 34°0′W	Arctic Ocean	
83°36′N 34°0′W	Greenland	
66°46′N 34°0′W	Atlantic Ocean	Passing just west of Rocas Atoll, Brazil (at 3°51′S 33°49′W)
60°0′S 34°0′W	Southern Ocean	
77°20′S 34°0′W	Antarctica	Claimed by both Argentina (Argentine Antarctica) and United Kingdom (British Antarctic Territory)

== See also ==
- 33rd meridian west
- 35th meridian west
