= 31st meridian west =

Line of longitude

31st meridian west (interactive map)

The meridian 31° west of Greenwich is a line of longitude that extends from the North Pole across the Arctic Ocean, Greenland, the Atlantic Ocean, the Southern Ocean, and Antarctica to the South Pole.

The 31st meridian west forms a great circle with the 149th meridian east.

== From Pole to Pole ==
Starting at the North Pole and heading south to the South Pole, the 31st meridian west passes through:

| Co-ordinates | Country, territory or sea | Notes |
|---|---|---|
| 90°0′N 31°0′W | Arctic Ocean | |
| 83°34′N 31°0′W | Greenland | Northern Peary Land |
| 83°6′N 31°0′W | Frederick E. Hyde Fjord | |
| 82°45′N 31°0′W | Greenland | Nordkrone |
| 82°0′N 31°0′W | Independence Fjord | |
| 81°50′N 31°0′W | Greenland | J.C. Christensen Land |
| 68°3′N 31°0′W | Atlantic Ocean | Passing just east of Corvo Island, Azores, Portugal (at 39°42′N 31°5′W); Passing just east of Flores Island, Azores, Portugal (at 39°27′N 31°7′W) |
| 60°0′S 31°0′W | Southern Ocean | |
| 76°51′S 31°0′W | Antarctica | Claimed by both Argentina (Argentine Antarctica) and United Kingdom (British Antarctic Territory) |

== See also ==
- 30th meridian west
- 32nd meridian west
