= List of glaciers in Europe =

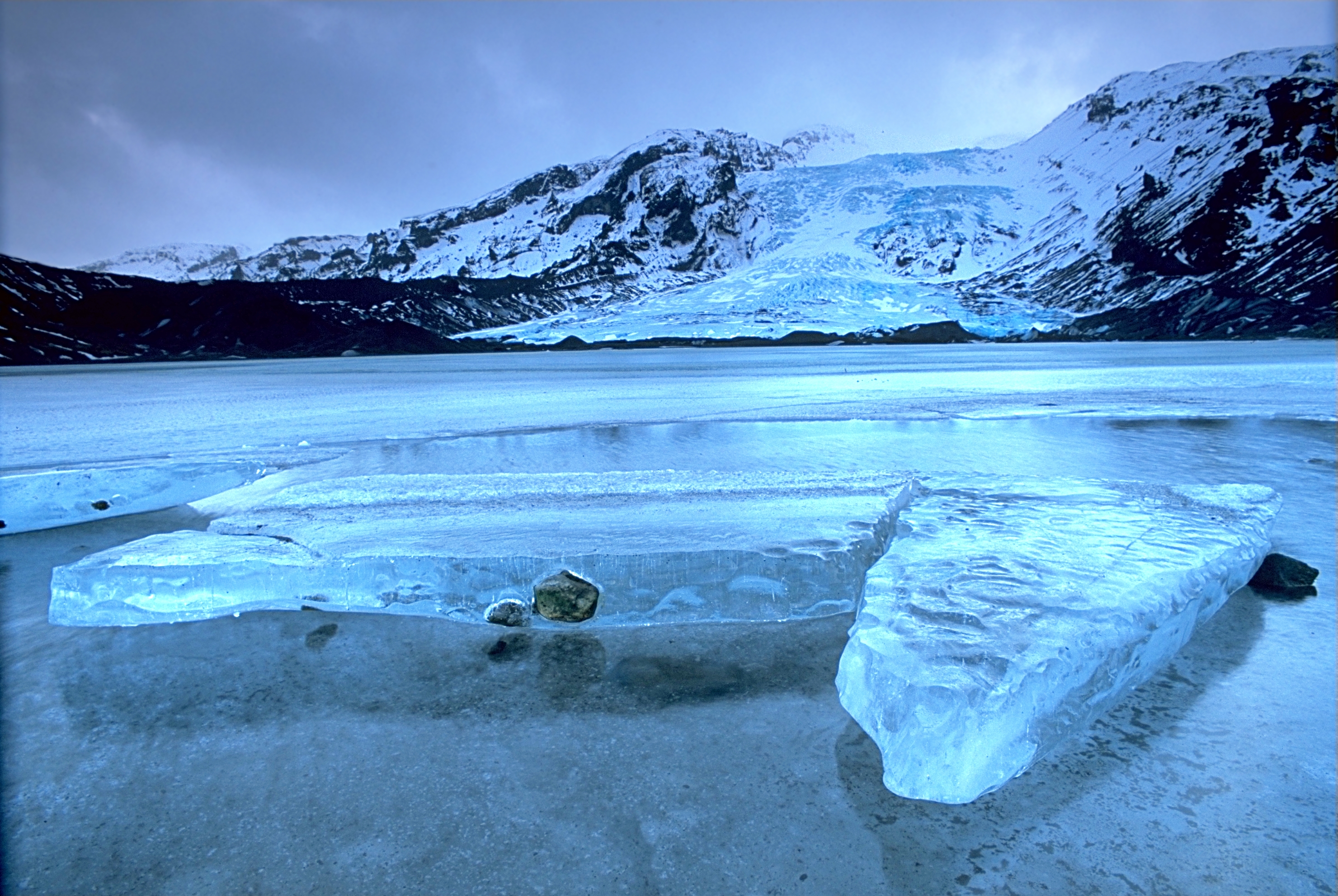
Eyjafjallajökull, Iceland.

This is a list of glaciers in Europe.

== Austria ==
- Eiskar
- Pasterze Glacier
- Schlatenkees Glacier
- Kitzsteinhorn Glacier
- Hintertux Glacier
- Hallstätter Glacier
- Stubai Glacier
- Pitztal Glacier
- Rettenbach glacier
- Dachstein Glacier

== Bulgaria ==
- Banski Suhodol Glacier
- Snezhnika (southernmost in Europe)

== France ==
- Mer de Glace
- Glacier d'Argentière
- Glacier d'Arsine
- Glacier d'Ossoue
- Glacier de Bellecote
- Glacier de Bionnassay
- Glacier de Borne Pierre
- Glacier de la Plate des Agneaux
- Glacier de Taconnaz
- Glacier de Trelatete
- Glacier des Bossons
- Glacier du Peclet
- Glacier de Saint Sorlin, Glacier de l'Etendard
- Glacier de Gebroulaz
- Glacier de Sarennes
- Glacier Noir
- Glacier Blanc
- Glacier des Glaciers
- La Grande Motte

== Georgia ==
- Abano
- Adishi
- Bokho
- Chata
- Denkara
- Devdaraki
- Dolra
- Donguzorun
- Gergeti
- Ledeshdvi
- Lekhziri Glacier
- Mna
- Notsarula
- Tsaneri
- Tviberi

== Germany ==
- Höllentalferner
- Schneeferner
- Watzmann Glacier
- Blaueis

== Iceland ==
- Barkárdalsjökull
- Eiríksjökull
- Eyjafjallajökull
- Drangajökull
- Gljúfurárjökull
- Langjökull
- Hjaltadalsjökul
- Hofsjökull
- Kaldaklofsjökull
- Kambsjökull
- Myrkárjökull
- Mýrdalsjökull
- Snæfellsjökull
- Sólheimajökull
- Tindfjallajökull
- Torfajökull
- Tungnafellsjökull
- Tungnahryggsjökull
- Vatnajökull
- Vindheimajökull
- Þórisjökull
- Þrándarjökull
- Þverárjökull

== Italy ==
The Italian glaciological committee reports more than 700 glaciers in Italy.

- Belvedere Glacier
- Bors glacier
- Brenva Glacier
- Calderone glacier (Ghiacciaio del Calderone)
- Canin Glacier
- Careser Glacier
- Forni Glacier
- Frebouge Glacier
- Lex Blanche Glacier
- Lobbia Glacier
- Loccie Glacier
- Lys glacier
- Madaccio Glacier
- Mandrone Glacier
- Mare Glacier
- Marmolada Glacier
- Miage Glacier (Ghiacciaio del Miage)
- Montasio Glacier
- Planpincieux Glacier
- Platigliole Glacier
- Praz-Sec Glacier
- Presena Glacier
- Sesia Glacier (Ghiacciaio del Sesia)
- Toula Glacier
- Tresero Glacier
- Triolet Glacier
- Vigne Glacier (Italy)

== Norway ==
- Austfonna
- Blåmannsisen
- Buarbreen
- Folgefonna
- Frostisen
- Gihtsejiegŋa
- Harbardsbreen
- Hardangerjøkulen
- Jostedalsbreen
- Myklebustbreen
- Nordre Folgefonna
- Okstindbreen
- Spørteggbreen
- Sulitjelma Glacier
- Svartisen
- Søndre Folgefonna
- Sørbreen
- Øksfjordjøkelen

== Romania ==
- Scarisoara Glacier
- Focul Viu Glacier

== Russia ==
- Academy of Sciences Glacier (Lednik Akademii Nauk) - Severnaya Zemlya
- Albanov Glacier (Lednik Al'banova) - Severnaya Zemlya
- Anna Glacier (Lednik Anny)
- Anuchin Glacier (Lednik Anuchina)
- Arkhangel Bay Glacier (Lednik Arkhangel'skoy Guby)
- Brounov Glacier (Lednik Brounova)
- Borzov Glacier (Lednik Borzova)
- Bull Glacier (Lednik Bull)
- Bunge Glacier (Lednik Bunge)
- Chayev Glacier (Lednik Chayeva)
- Chernishev Glacier (Lednik Chernishëva)
- Dezhnev Glacier (Lednik Dezhnëva) - Severnaya Zemlya
- Glazov Glacier (Lednik Glazov)
- Goluboy Glacier (Lednik Goluboy)
- Grotov Glacier (Lednik Grotov) - Severnaya Zemlya
- Inostrantsev Glacier (Lednik Inostrantseva)
- Karbasnikov Glacier (Lednik Karbasnikova)
- Karpinskov Glacier (Lednik Karpinskogo) - Severnaya Zemlya
- Kirov Glacier (Lednik Kirova) - Franz Josef Land
- Kolka Glacier
- Krayniy Glacier (Lednik Krayniy)
- Kropotkin Glacier (Lednik Kropotkina)
- Kropotkin Glacier (Severnaya Zemlya) (Lednik Kropotkina) - Severnaya Zemlya
- Kupol Lunnyy, ice cap - Franz Josef Land
- Lakrua Glacier (Lednik Lakrua)
- Mack Glacier (Lednik Maka)
- Malyutka Glacier (Lednik Malyutka) - Severnaya Zemlya
- Middendorff Glacier (Lednik Middendorfa) - Franz Josef Land
- Molochnyy Glacier (Lednik Molochnyy) - Franz Josef Land
- Molotov Glacier (Lednik Molotova) - Severnaya Zemlya
- Moschnyy Glacier (Lednik Moschnyy)
- Mushketov Glacier (Lednik Mushketova) - Severnaya Zemlya
- Nansen Glacier (Lednik Nansena)
- Neponyatyy Glacier (Lednik Neponyatyy) - Severnaya Zemlya
- Nizkiy Glacier (Lednik Nizkiy)
- Nordenskiöld Glacier (Lednik Nordenshel'da)
- Obruchev Glacier (Lednik Obrucheva) - Franz Josef Land
- Otdel’nyy Glacier (Lednik Otdel’nyy) - Severnaya Zemlya
- Pavlov Glacier (Lednik Pavlova)
- Payer Glacier (Lednik Payyera) - Franz Josef Land
- Petersen Glacier (Lednik Petersena)
- Pioneer Glacier (Lednik Pioner) - Severnaya Zemlya
- Popov Glacier (Lednik Popova)
- Polisadov Glacier (Lednik Polisadova)
- Rikachev Glacier (Lednik Rykachëva)
- Roze Glacier (Lednik Roze)
- Rozhdestvensky Glacier (Lednik Rozhdestvenskogo)
- Rusanov Glacier (Lednik Rusanova) - Severnaya Zemlya
- Semyonov-Tyan-Shansky Glacier (Lednik Semënova Tyan-Shanskogo) - Severnaya Zemlya
- Serp i Molot Glacier (Lednik Serp i Molot)
- Severnyy Glacier (Lednik Severnyy)
- Severny Island ice cap (Largest by area in Europe)
- Shirokiy Glacier (Lednik Shirokiy)
- Shokalsky Glacier (Lednik Shokal'skogo)
- Schmidt Island ice cap - Severnaya Zemlya
- Sonklar Glacier (Lednik Sonklar) - Franz Josef Land
- Sredniy Glacier (Lednik Sredniy)
- Stremitel’nyy Glacier (Lednik Stremitel’nyy) - Franz Josef Land
- Taisiya Glacier (Lednik Taisiya)
- University Glacier (Lednik Universitetskiy) - Severnaya Zemlya
- Vavilov Glacier (Lednik Vavilova) - Severnaya Zemlya
- Velken Glacier (Lednik Vel'kena)
- Vershinsky Glacier (Lednik Vershinskogo)
- Vitte Glacier (Lednik Vitte)
- Viz Glacier (Lednik Viz) - Franz Josef Land
- Vize Glacier (Lednik Vize)
- Voyekov Glacier (Lednik Voyekova)
- Vuster Glacier (Lednik Vuster) - Franz Josef Land
- Yuzhnyy Glacier (Lednik Yuzhnyy)
- Zemlya Georga Ice Cap - Franz Josef Land
- Znamenityy Glacier (Lednik Znamenityy) - Franz Josef Land

== Slovakia ==
Glaciers:

- Großes Papirustal (Veľká zmrzlá dolina), specifically in Medená kotlina, a glacieret (18–20 m thick, with a volume of approximately 150,000 cubic metres) situated beneath a layer of rock debris – Vysoké Tatry

Ice caves:

- Demänovská Ice Cave (Demänovská ľadová jaskyňa) – Demänovská Valley, Nízke Tatry (Low Tatras)
- Dobšiná Ice Cave (Dobšinská ľadová jaskyňa) – Slovenský raj (Slovak Paradise / Volovské vrchy)
- Silická ľadnica – Silická Plateau, Slovenský kras (Slovak Karst)

== Slovenia ==
- Triglav Glacier
- Skuta Glacier

== Spain ==
Glaciers in the Sierra Nevada and the Picos de Europa melted by the end of the 19th century. In 2006, ten small glaciers and six glaciers-glacierets remain in the Spanish Pyrenees. The largest are on:

- Aneto: the Maladeta and Aneto glaciers.
- Monte Perdido: Gabietous, Taillon and Monte Perdido glaciers.
- Picos del Infierno: Infierno glacier.
- Posets: Llardana glacier.
- Vignemale: Oulettes and Ossue glaciers.
- Mont Valier: Arcouzan.

The pyrenees have a lot of small glaciers that have stopped moving or haven't been studied since becoming very small. For example, in the Monte Perdido masif there were many more glaciers, like the Grieta, the La cascade, the Marboré, the Paillas (two glaciers), and the Astazou. As of today these glaciers still have glacier snow and some, like the Astazou or the Paillas, that are the biggest, could be considered glaciers, but they haven't been studied in recent years.

== Sweden ==
Sweden has a total of around 300 glaciers. The largest is Stuorrajekna in Sulitelma with an area of 13 km^{2}.

== Switzerland ==
- Aletsch Glacier
- Allalin Glacier
- Brunegg Glacier
- Corbassière Glacier
- Fee Glacier
- Ferpècle Glacier
- Fiescher Glacier
- Findel Glacier
- Gauli Glacier
- Gorner Glacier
- Haut Glacier d'Arolla
- Bas Glacier d'Arolla
- Hufi Glacier
- Kander Glacier
- Lang Glacier
- Lower Grindelwald Glacier
- Mont Miné Glacier
- Morteratsch Glacier
- Oberaletsch Glacier
- Oberaar Glacier
- Otemma Glacier
- Plaine Morte Glacier
- Rhône Glacier
- Saleina Glacier
- Trift Glacier
- Glacier de Tsijiore Nouve
- Glacier de Tsanfleuron
- Unteraar Glacier
- Upper Grindelwald Glacier
- Zinal Glacier
- Zmutt Glacier
- Vorab Glacier

== Images ==
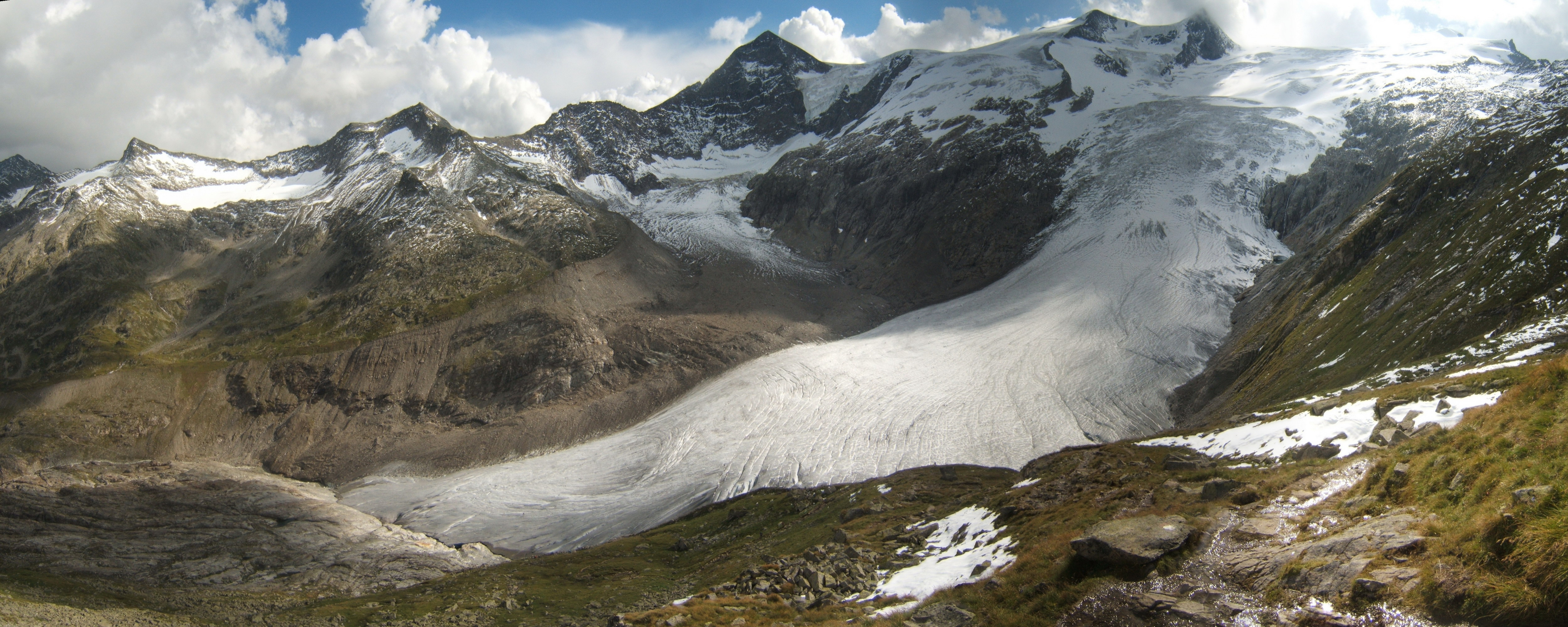
Schlatenkees Glacier, Austria.

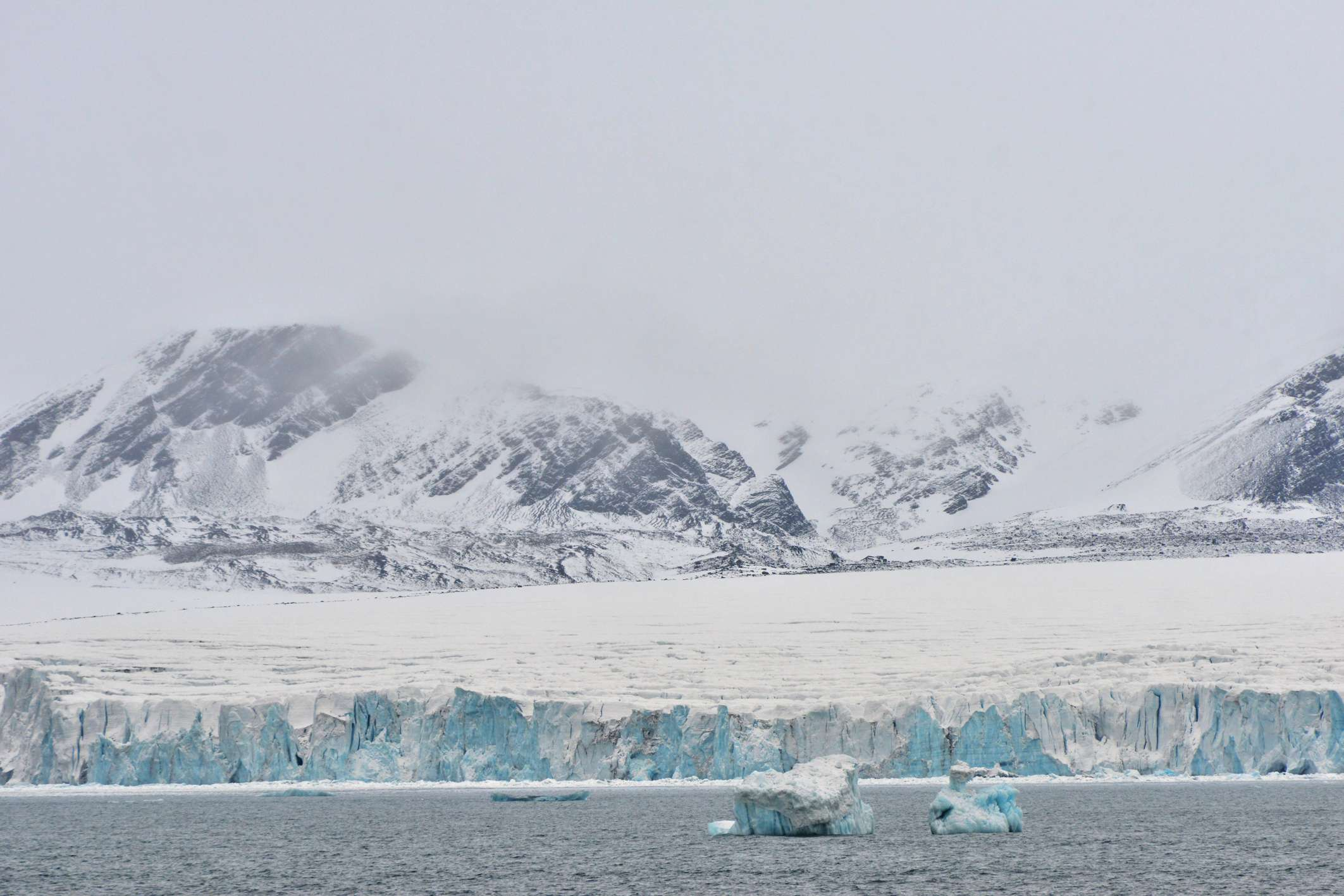
View of Inostrantsev Glacier, Novaya Zemlya.

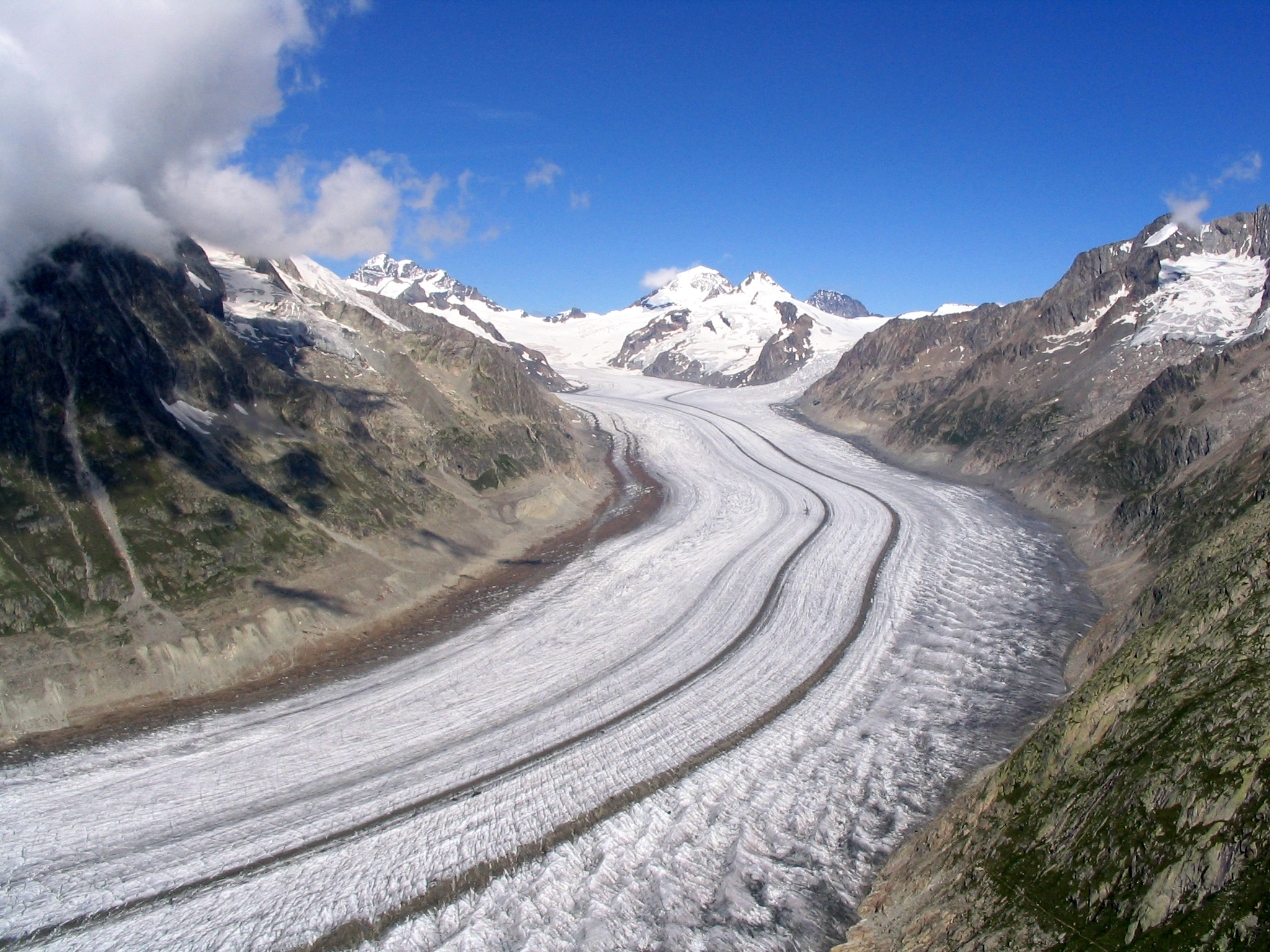
Aletsch Glacier, Switzerland.

== See also ==
- List of glaciers
- Southernmost glacial mass in Europe
