= Tsaneri Glacier =

Glacier in Georgia

Tsaneri
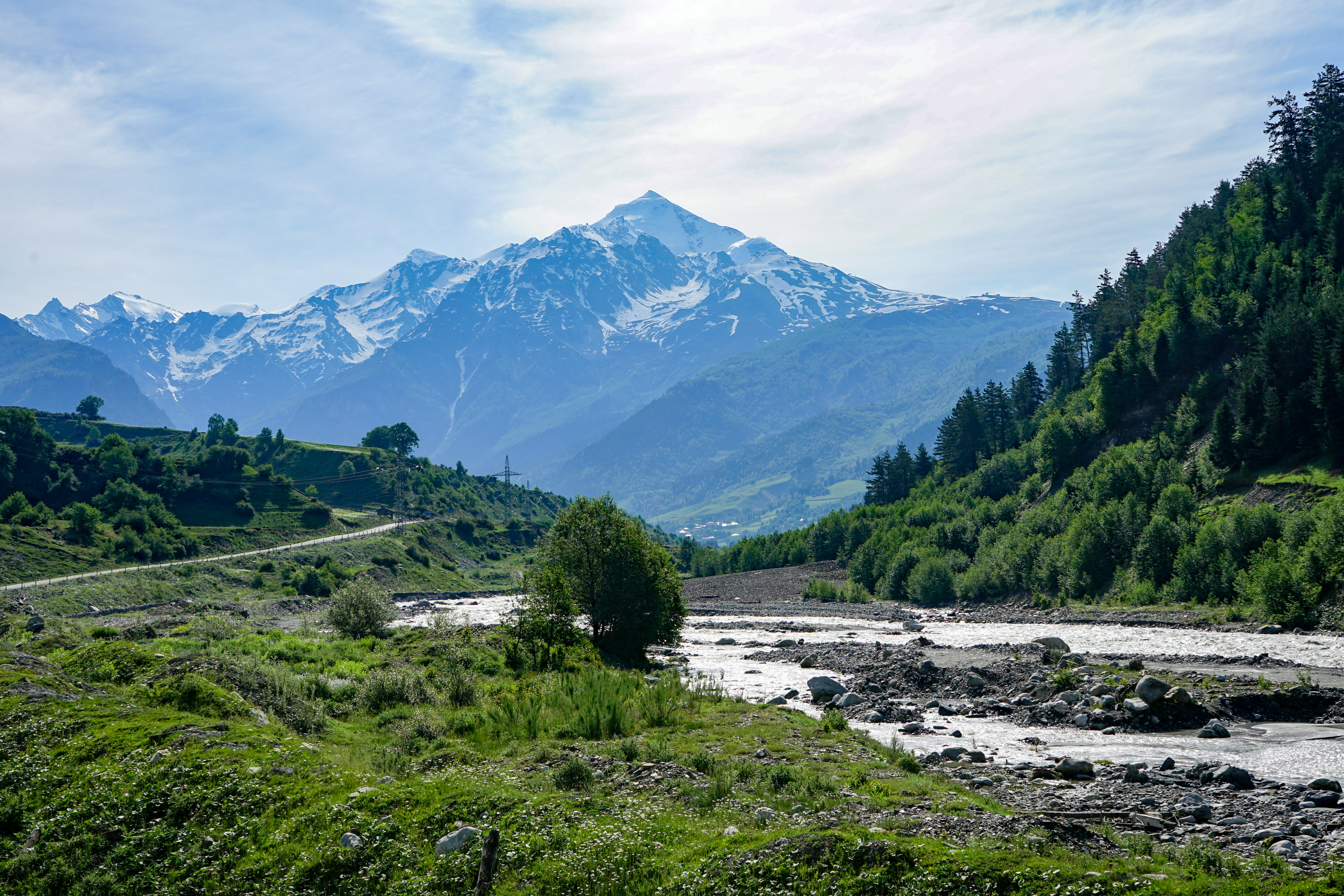
- Mount Tetnuldi and Mulkhra River in the neighborhood of Tsaneri Glacier

- Location within Samegrelo-Zemo Svaneti Location within Georgia
- Interactive map of Tsaneri
- Type: Valley glacier
- Location: Svaneti, Georgia
- Coordinates: 43°04′29″N 42°57′31″E
- Area: 28.8 km^{2} (7,117 acres)
- Length: 11.2 km^{2} (2,768 acres)

Tsaneri is a valley glacier located on the southern slopes of the Greater Caucasus Mountain Range in the Svaneti Region of Georgia. The glacier lies at and above the source the river Mulkhra. The length of the Tsaneri Glacier is 11.2 kilometres (7.0 mi) and its surface area is 28.8 km^{2} (11.1 sq mi). Tsaneri consists of two branches that feed off of the adjacent glaciers that are located on the slopes of Mt. Tikhtengeni, Lalveri, Tetnuldi, and Gistola.

== Size ==
In the 19th century, Tsaneri Glacier was the second largest glacier in Georgia after the glacier Tviberi Glacier: according to topographic maps from 1887, the surface of the glacier with the connected Nageba Glacier was about 48.9 km².

In 1960, the area of Tsaneri Glacier without the Nageba Glacier was about 28.3 km2. In the following years, the glacier was divided into the southern and northern parts, which in 2014 covered respectively 12.6 km² and 11.5 km².

== See also ==
- Glaciers of Georgia
