= Glazov Glacier =

Glacier in Russia

Glazov Glacier ледник Глазов
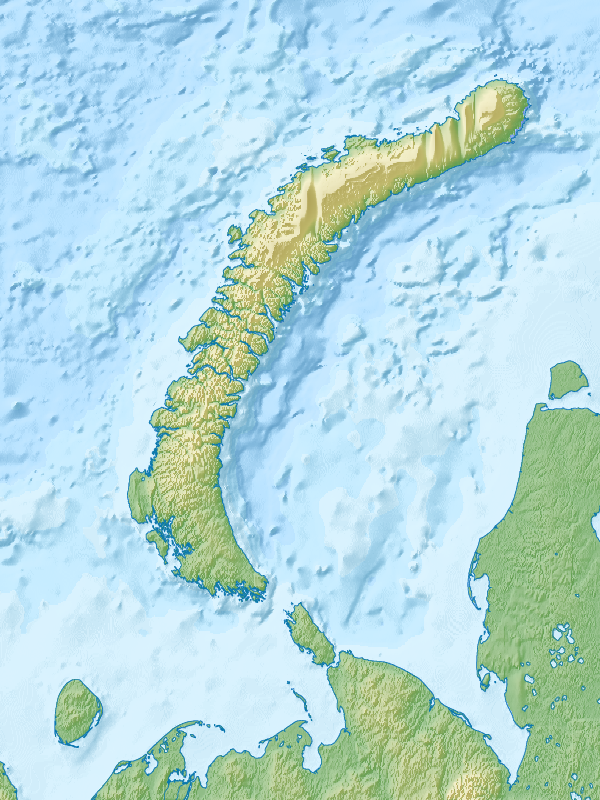
- Location within Novaya Zemlya
- Interactive map of Glazov Glacier ледник Глазов
- Type: Tidewater glacier
- Location: Novaya Zemlya; Russian Federation
- Coordinates: 75°9′N 57°24′E
- Length: 30 km (19 mi)
- Width: 3.5 km (2.2 mi)
- Terminus: Glazov Bay; Barents Sea

The Glazov Glacier (Russian: ледник Глазов; lednik Glazov) is a glacier in Novaya Zemlya, Arkhangelsk Oblast, Russia.

The Glazov glacier has retreated between 2 kilometres (1.2 mi) and 3 kilometres (1.9 mi) in recent years. Two new islands and two headlands have been exposed in the area of the mouth of the fjord as a result.

== Geography ==
The Glazov Glacier is located on the western side of northern Severny Island of Novaya Zemlya. It is a tidewater glacier flowing from the Severny Island ice cap in a roughly southeast–northwest direction. Its terminus is at Glazov Bay, a 5 kilometres (3.1 mi) wide fjord located just south of Nordenskiöld Bay in the Barents Sea.

1,547 metres (5,075 ft) high Mount Kruzenshtern, the highest point of Novaya Zemlya, rises on the northern side of the head of the Glazov Glacier.

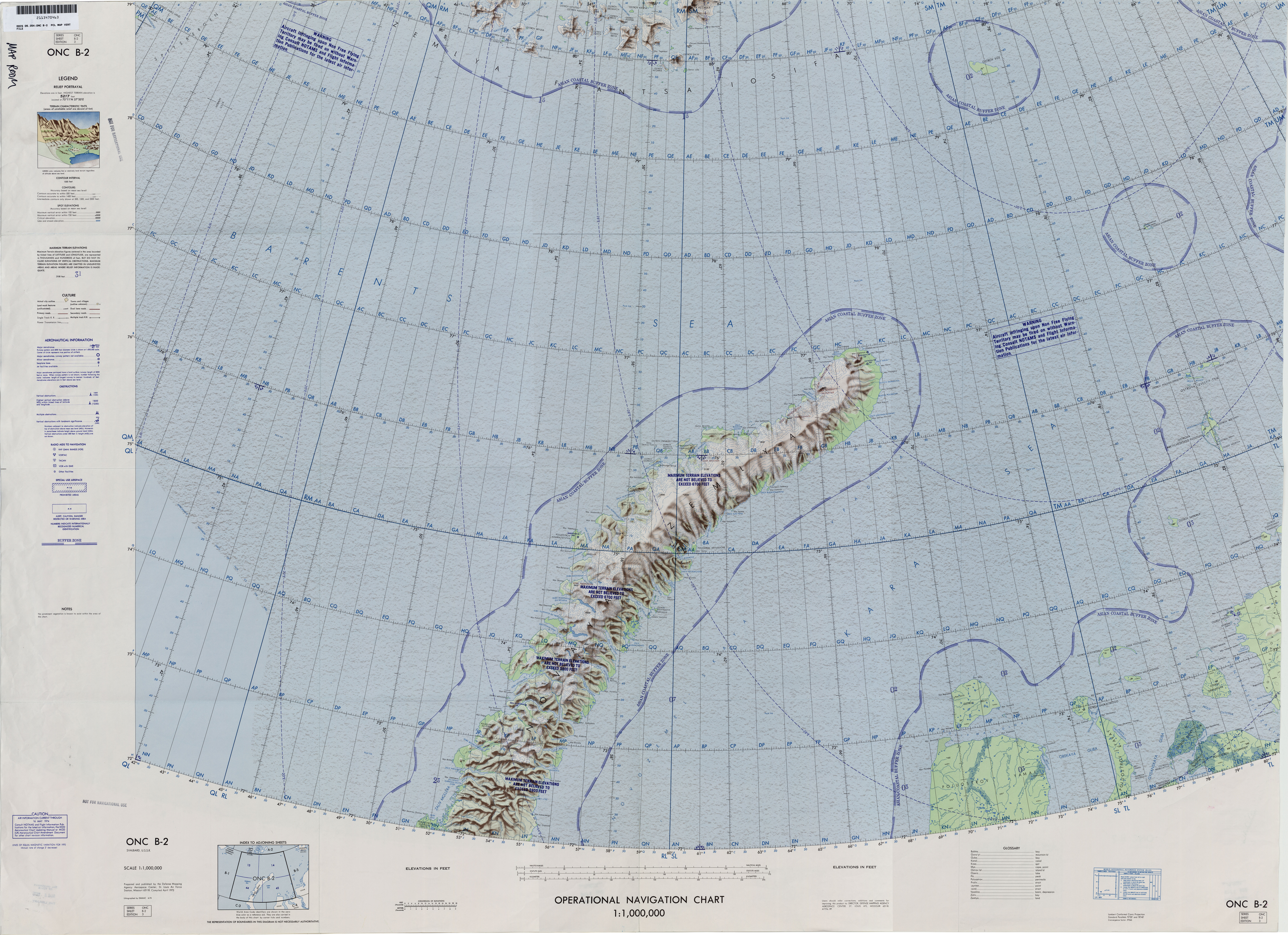
Map of northern Novaya Zemlya and southern Franz Josef Land.

== See also ==
- List of glaciers in Europe
- List of glaciers in Russia
