= Nordenskiöld Bay, Novaya Zemlya =

Fjord in Barents Sea, Russia

Nordenskiöld Bay
- Nordenskiöld Fjord
- Залив Норденшельда (Russian)
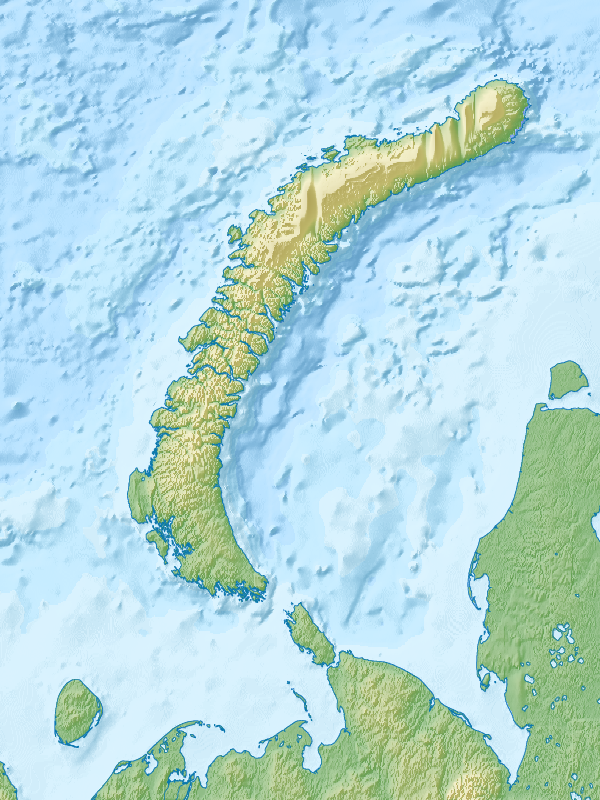
- Location
- Location: Far North
- Coordinates: 75°24′56″N 57°30′0″E
- Ocean/sea sources: Barents Sea
- Basin countries: Russia
- Max. length: 20 km (12 mi)
- Max. width: 6 km (3.7 mi)

Nordenskiöld Bay (Russian: Залив Норденшельда) or Nordenskiöld Fjord is a fjord on the Barents Sea coast of Severny Island in Novaya Zemlya, Russia. The fjord is named after Arctic explorer Adolf Erik Nordenskiöld.

== Geography ==
The fjord opens to the northwest in the western coast of the island between Cape Maslennikov in the west and Cape Cherny in the north. It narrows about 10 km (6.2 mi) from its mouth, bending in a west/east direction. Three glaciers converge at the head of the fjord, discharging from the Severny Island ice cap and covering the inner fjord with ice. Mount Kruzenshtern is located near the fjord.

== See also ==
- List of fjords of Russia
