= Abano Glacier =

Glacier in Georgia

Abano
- Location within Mtskheta-Mtianeti Location within Georgia
- Interactive map of Abano
- Type: Valley glacier
- Location: Kazbegi District, Georgia
- Coordinates: 42°41′47″N 44°32′19″E
- Area: 1.6 km^{2} (395 acres)
- Length: 5.6 km (3 miles)

Abano Glacier is located on the southeastern slope of Mt. Kazbek in the Kazbegi District of Georgia. The length of the glacier is 4.6 km (2.9 mi) and its surface area is 1.6 km^{2} (0.62 sq mi). The maximum width of the Abano Glacier is 610 metres (2,000 ft). Its meltwater is drained towards the river Terek.

== See also ==
- Glaciers of Georgia
