= Inostrantsev Glacier =

Glacier in Russia

Inostrantsev Glacier ледник Иностранцева
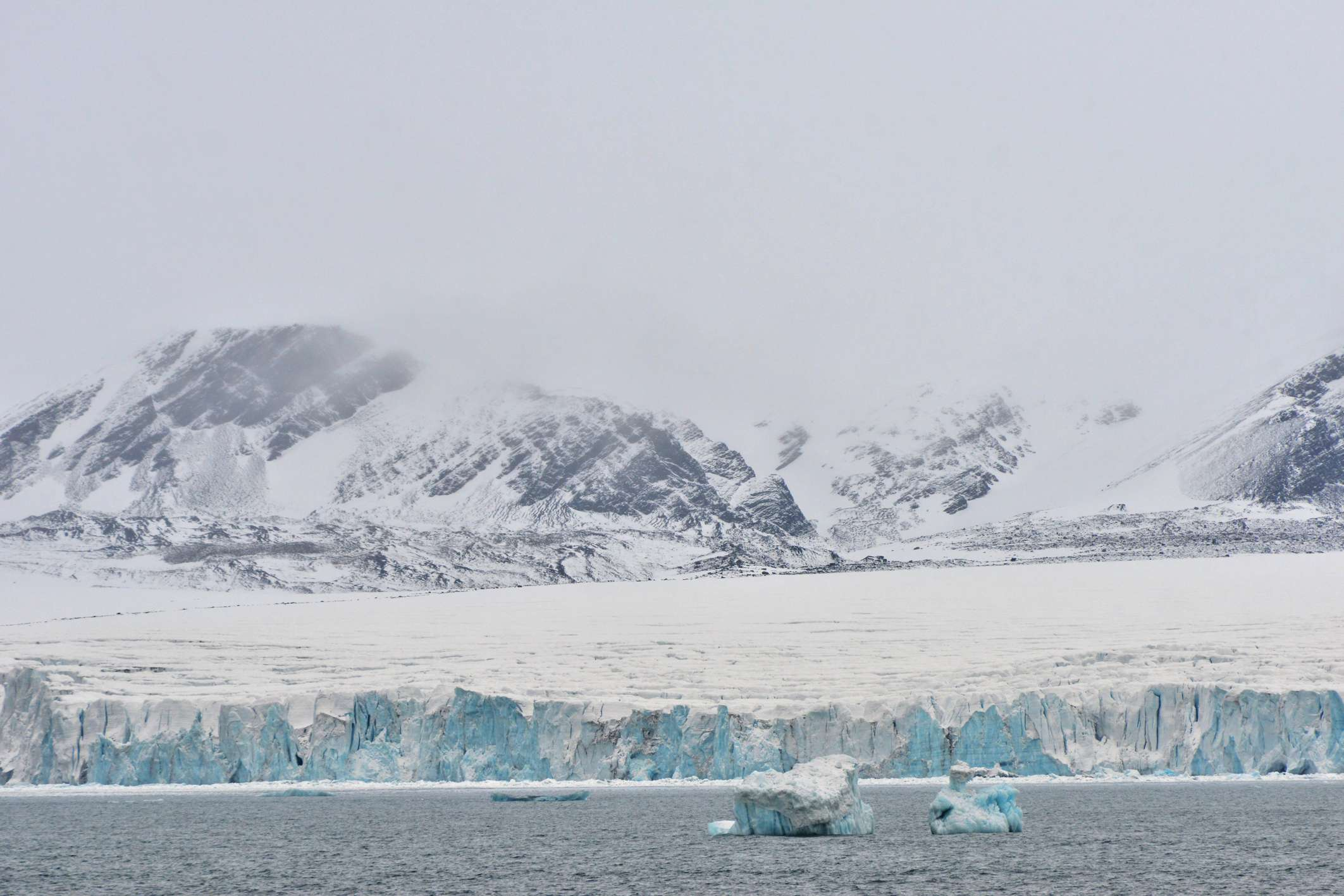
- Inostrantsev Glacier. View of the terminus.

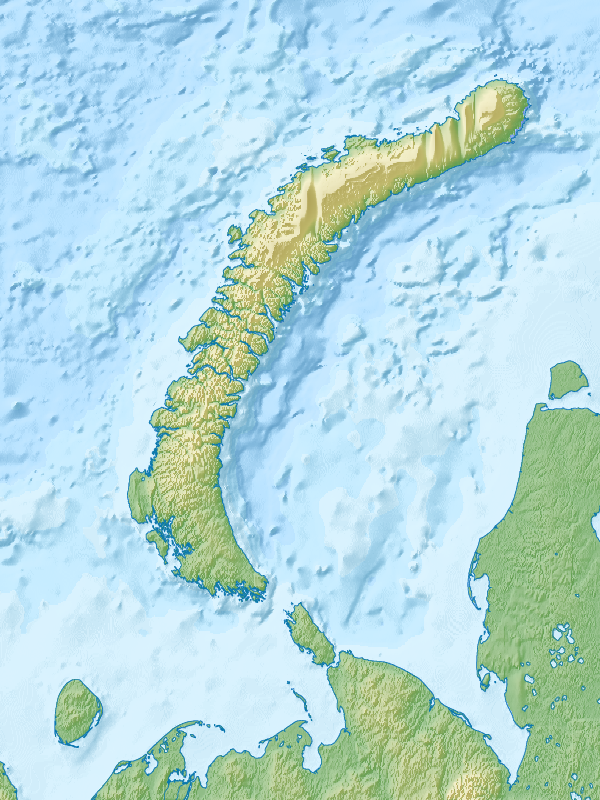
- Location within Novaya Zemlya
- Interactive map of Inostrantsev Glacier ледник Иностранцева
- Type: Tidewater glacier
- Location: Novaya Zemlya; Russian Federation
- Coordinates: 76°27′N 66°11′E
- Length: 35 km (22 mi)
- Width: 3 km (1.9 mi)
- Terminus: Inostransev Bay; Barents Sea

The Inostrantsev Glacier (Russian: ледник Иностранцева; lednik Inostrantseva) is one of the major glaciers in Novaya Zemlya, Arkhangelsk Oblast, Russia.

It was named after Russian geologist, member of the Russian Academy of Sciences and professor at St. Petersburg University Alexander Alexandrovich Inostrantsev (Александр Александрович Иностранцев) by Arctic explorer Georgy Sedov.

== Geography ==
The Inostrantsev Glacier is located on the western side of northern Severny Island of Novaya Zemlya. Flowing from the Severny Island ice cap, it is a roughly southeast-northwest oriented tidewater glacier and its front, where other three smaller tributary glaciers merge, has a width of over 3 km. Its terminus is at the Inostrantsev Bay (zaliv Inostrantseva) of the Barents Sea, a 14 km wide and 130 m deep fjord.

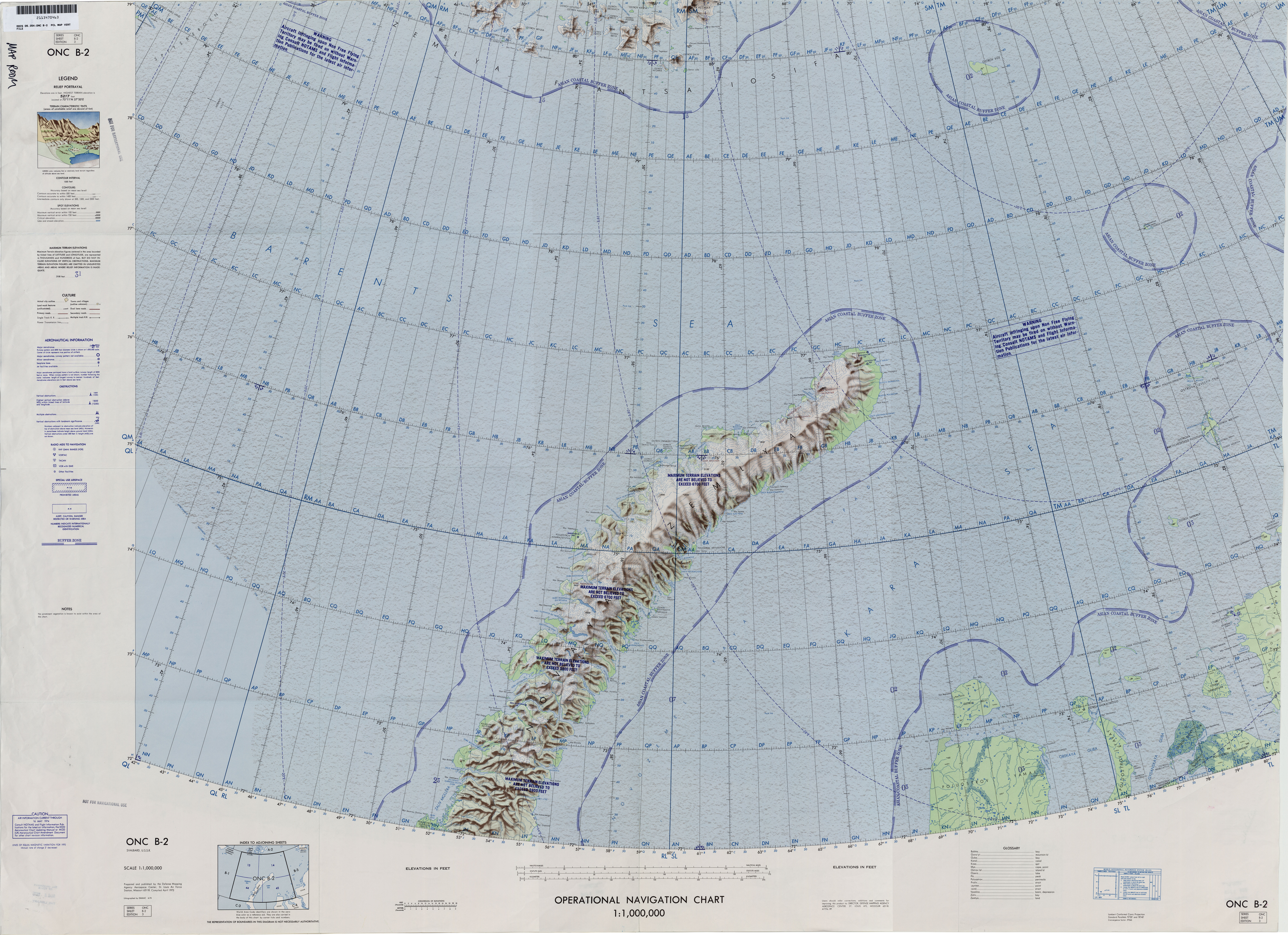
Map of northern Novaya Zemlya and southern Franz Josef Land.

== See also ==
- List of glaciers in Europe
- List of glaciers in Russia
- Inostrancevia, another notable example of Inostrantsev as a namesake.
