= Lekhziri Glacier =

Glacier in Georgia

Coordinates: 43.1553°N 42.7678°E

Lekhziri
- Interactive map of Lekhziri
- Type: Valley glacier
- Location: Svaneti, Georgia
- Area: 33.4 km^{2} (8,253 acres)
- Length: 11.4 km (7 miles)

Lekhziri Glacier (Georgian: ლეხზირი) is a valley glacier located on the southern slopes of the Greater Caucasus Mountain Range in the Svaneti Region of Georgia. The length of the glacier is 11.5 kilometres (7.1 mi) and its surface area is 33.4 square kilometres (12.9 sq mi). The tongue of the glacier descends down to 1,950 metres (6,400 ft) above sea level. Lekhziri consists of three separate glaciers; North, East and West Lekhziri. From the point where the three different glaciers intersect, the surface of Lekhziri becomes largely covered with morainal sediments and debris. The glacier feeds off the ice-flows and avalanches from the adjacent mountains.

== See also ==
- Glaciers of Georgia
