= Mount Kruzenshtern =

Mountain in Arkhangelsk Oblast, Russia

- Гора Крузенштерна
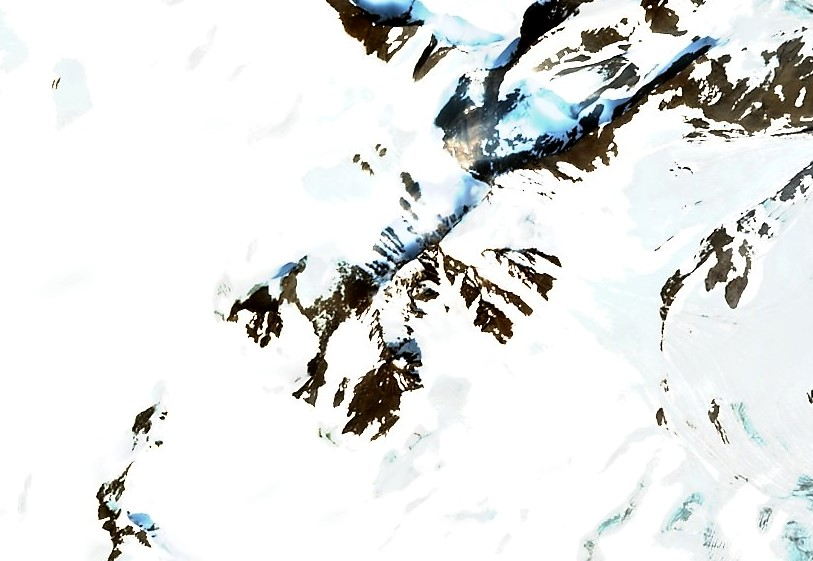
- Sentinel-2 image of Mount Kruzenshtern

Highest point
- Elevation: 1,547 m (5,075 ft)
- Prominence: 1,547 m (5,075 ft)
- Isolation: 1,077.44 km (669.49 mi)
- Coordinates: 75°10′32″N 57°49′33″E

Geography
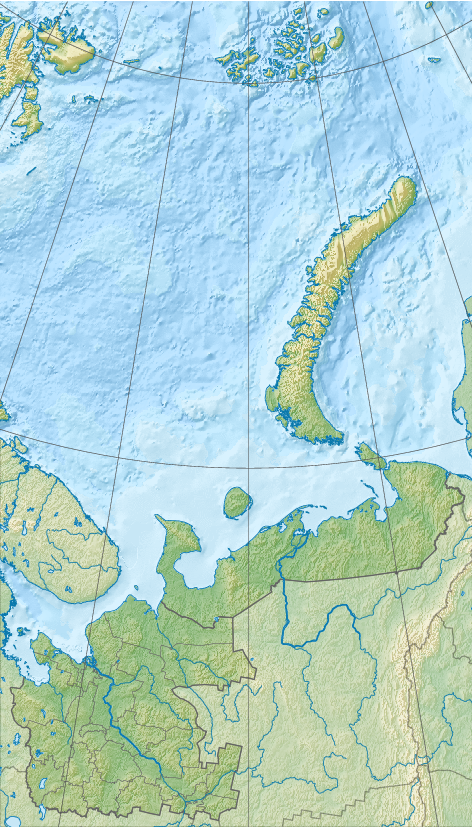
- Location within Arkhangelsk Oblast
- Location: Severny Island, Novaya Zemlya, Arkhangelsk Oblast, Russia

Mount Kruzenshtern (Russian: Гора Крузенштерна) is a peak in Severny Island, Novaya Zemlya, Arkhangelsk Oblast, Russia. It rises inland near the northwestern shore and is the highest point of Arkhangelsk Oblast.

The mountain was first put on the map in the 1820s by Arctic explorer Fyodor Litke (1797–1882) following his Novaya Zemlya explorations. It was named after Imperial Russian Navy Admiral Ivan Kruzenshtern (1770–1846). The mountain's name must have been known to Soviet topographers, but for undisclosed reasons it was omitted in USSR maps printed in the mid-20th century.

== Description ==
Mount Kruzenshtern is a 1,547 metre-high (5,075 ft) mountain located near Nordenskiöld Bay. It is an ultra-prominent peak that rises on the western edge of the Severny Island ice cap, north of the head of the Glazov Glacier.

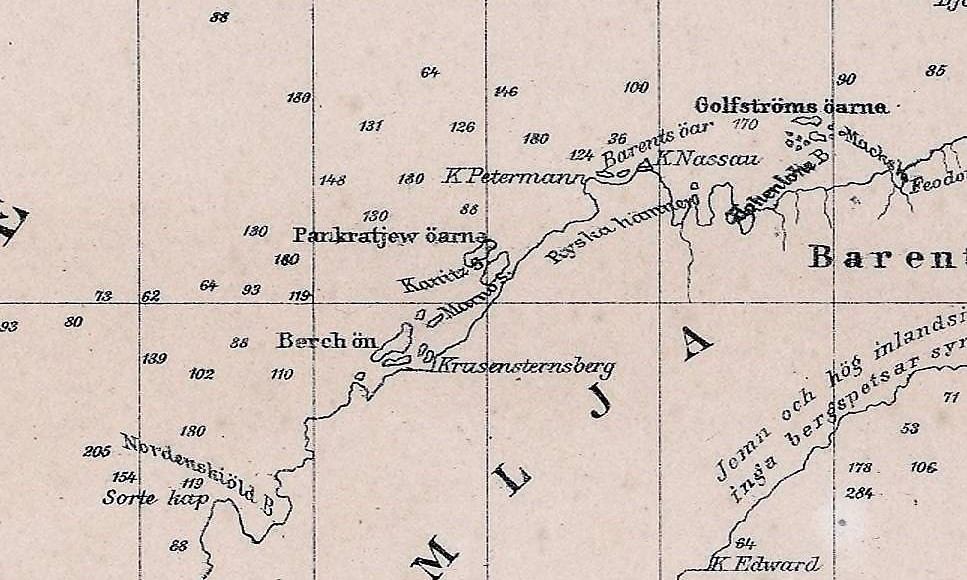
1878 map section centered on Mt Kruzenshtern

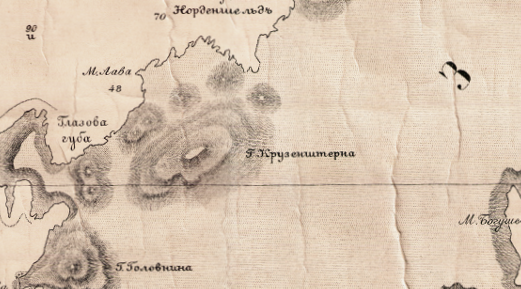
1897 map section centered on Mt Kruzenshtern

== See also ==
- List of highest points of Russian federal subjects
- List of mountains and hills of Russia
- List of European ultra-prominent peaks
- Most isolated major summits of Europe
