= Adishi Glacier =

Glacier in Georgia

Adishi
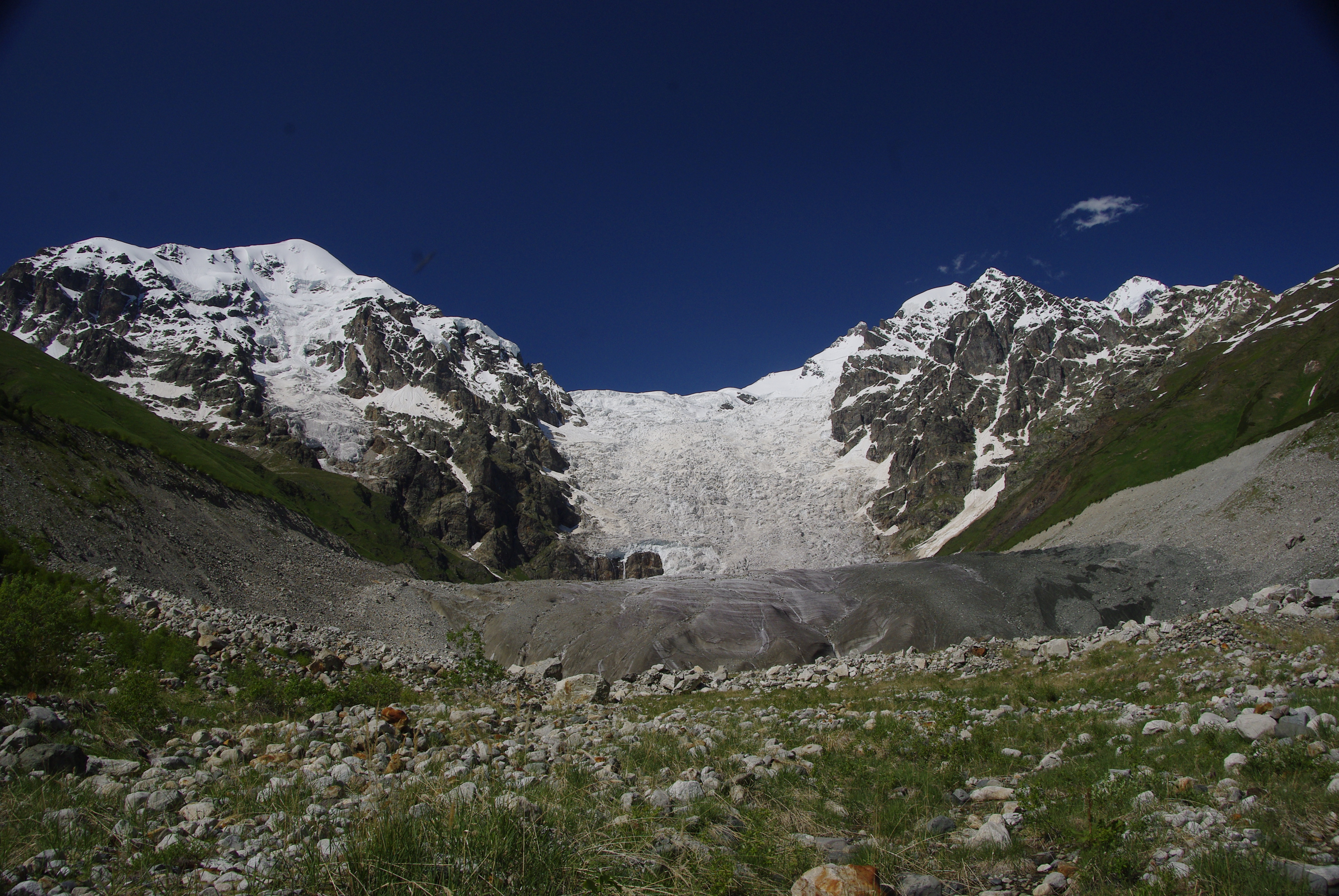

- Location within Samegrelo-Zemo Svaneti Location within Georgia
- Interactive map of Adishi
- Type: Valley glacier
- Location: Svaneti, Georgia
- Coordinates: 43°1′28″N 43°1′5″E
- Area: 12.9 km^{2} (3,188 acres)
- Length: 9 km (6 mi)

Adishi Glacier (Georgian: ადიშის მყინვარი) is a valley glacier located in the central part of the Greater Caucasus Mountain Range in the Svaneti Region of Georgia. The glacier lies on the southern slopes of the Caucasus. The length of the Adishi Glacier is 9 km (5.6 mi) and its surface area is 12.9 km^{2} (5.0 sq mi). The tongue of the glacier descends down to 2,298 m (7,539 ft) above sea level. The glacier feeds off of the runoff and ice flows from the adjacent glaciers that are located on the southern slopes of Tetnuldi, Gistola and Lakutsia. The Adishi Glacier is the source of the river Adishchala. The glacier takes its name from the nearby village Adishi.

== See also ==
- Mount Adishi
- Glaciers of Georgia
