= Nordenskiöld Glacier (Novaya Zemlya) =

Glacier in Russia

Nordenskiöld Glacier ледник Норденшельда
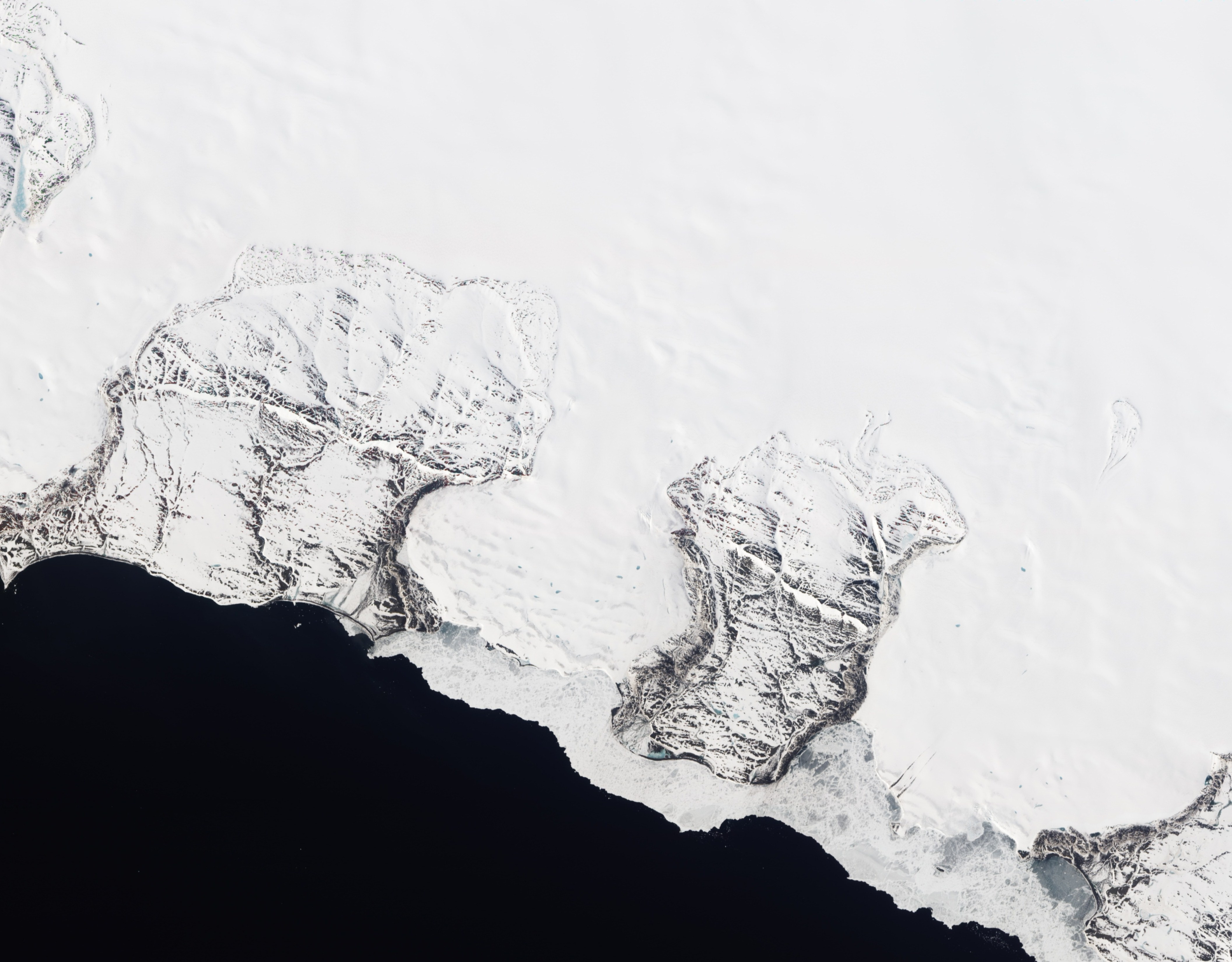
- NASA picture of Rozhdestvensky (left), Novopashenny (middle) and Roze glaciers of the Nordenskiöld Glacier group

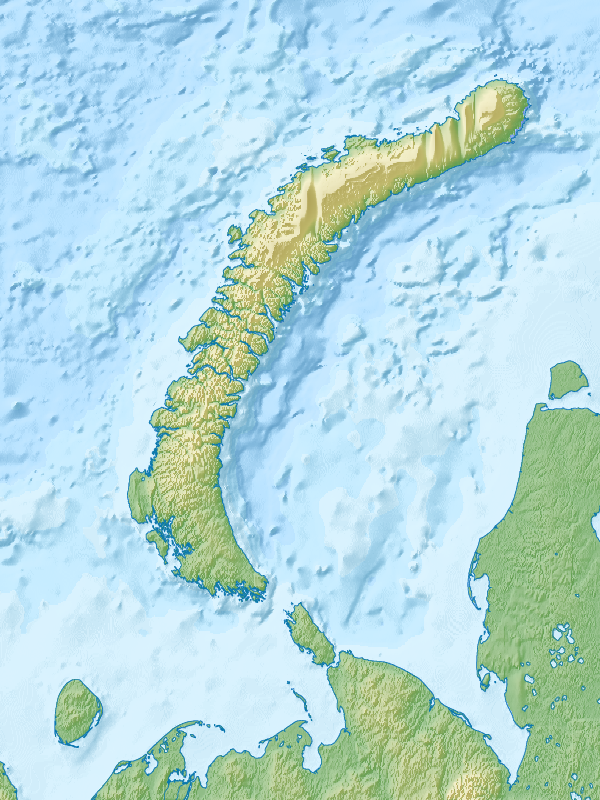
- Location within Novaya Zemlya
- Interactive map of Nordenskiöld Glacier ледник Норденшельда
- Type: Tidewater glacier group
- Location: Novaya Zemlya; Russian Federation
- Coordinates: 75°51′N 64°59′E
- Length: 20 km (12 mi) (average)
- Width: 5 km (3.1 mi) (average)
- Terminus: Kara Sea

The Nordenskiöld Glacier (Russian: ледник Норденшельда; lednik Nordenshel'da) is a group of four glaciers in Novaya Zemlya, Arkhangelsk Oblast, Russia.

This glacier group was named after Arctic explorer Adolf Erik Nordenskiöld.

== Geography ==
The Nordenskiöld Glacier group is located on the eastern side of the northern Severny Island of Novaya Zemlya. Flowing from the Severny Island ice cap, it is composed of four roughly north–south oriented tidewater glaciers:

- Vershinsky Glacier (Lednik Vershinskogo), the southwesternmost
- Rozhdestvensky Glacier (Lednik Rozhdestvenskogo)
- Novopashenny Glacier (Lednik Novopashennogo), also known as Lednik Sredniy
- Roze Glacier (Lednik Roze), the northeasternmost

Their fronts have widths of over 3 km on average and their terminuses are in the Kara Sea between Cape Opasnyy and Cape Middendorff.

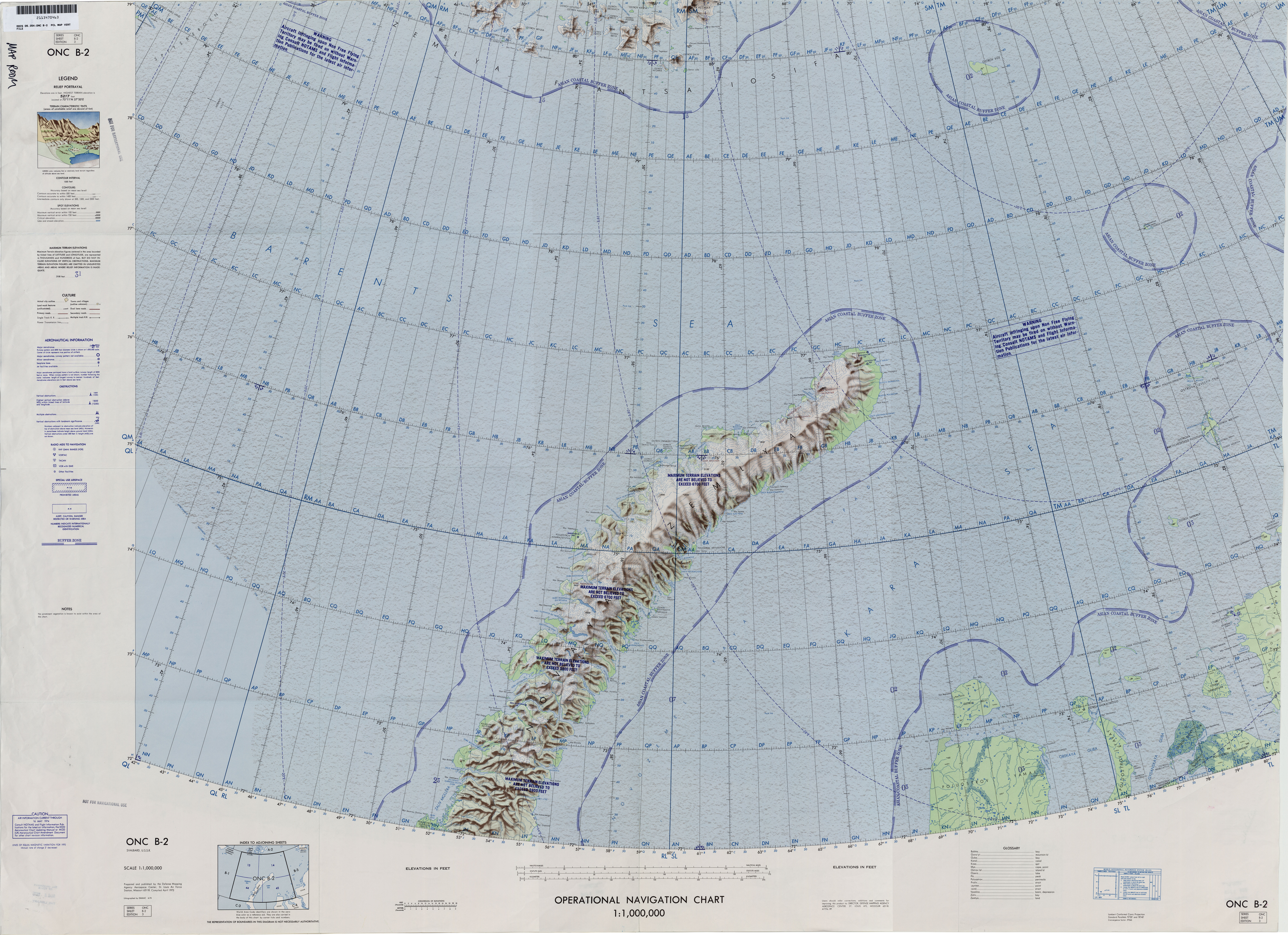
Map of northern Novaya Zemlya and southern Franz Josef Land.

== See also ==
- List of glaciers in Europe
- List of glaciers in Russia
