= Dolra =

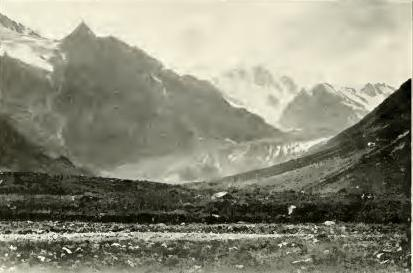

- Location within Samegrelo-Zemo Svaneti Location within Georgia
- Interactive map of Dolra
- Type: Valley glacier
- Location: Svaneti, Georgia
- Coordinates: 43°10′09″N 42°31′25″E
- Area: 5.5 km^{2} (1,359 acres)
- Length: 8.8 km (5 mi)

Dolra is a valley glacier located on the southern slopes of the Greater Caucasus Mountain Range in the Svaneti Region of Georgia. The length of the glacier is 5.5 km (3.4 mi) and its surface area is 8.8 km^{2} (3.4 sq mi). The tongue of the Dolra Glacier descends down to 2,530 metres (8,300 ft) above sea level. The glacier is the source of the river Dolraschala.

== See also ==
- Glaciers of Georgia
