= Glaciers of Georgia =

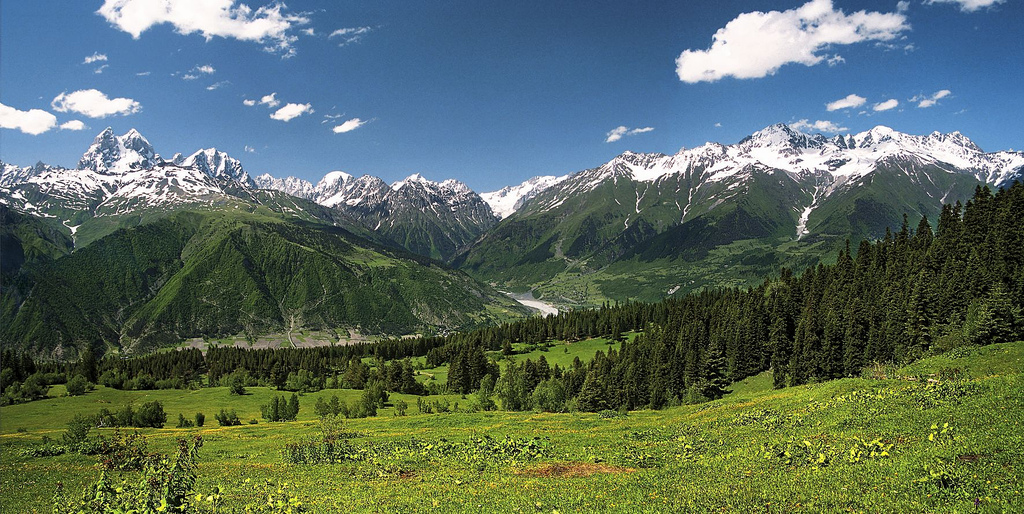
Svaneti contains Georgia's largest glaciers.

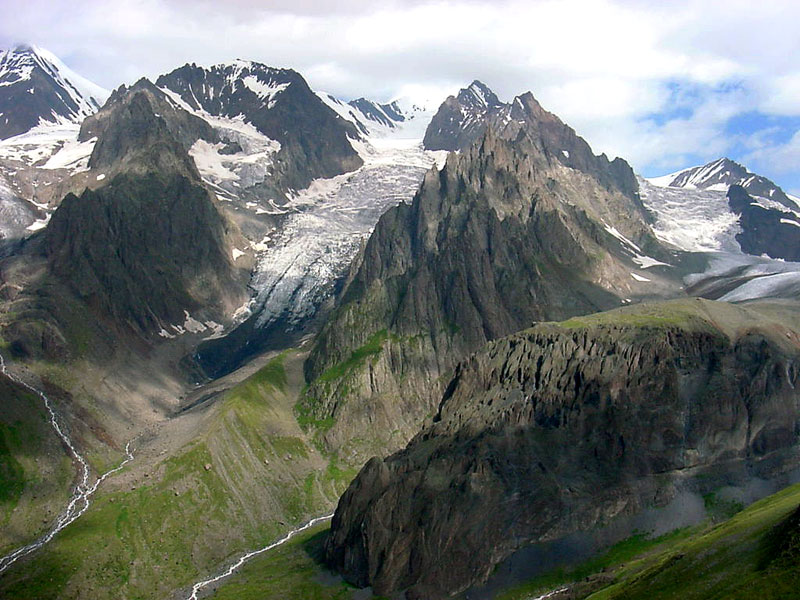
View towards smaller, isolated groups of glaciers in Eastern Georgia

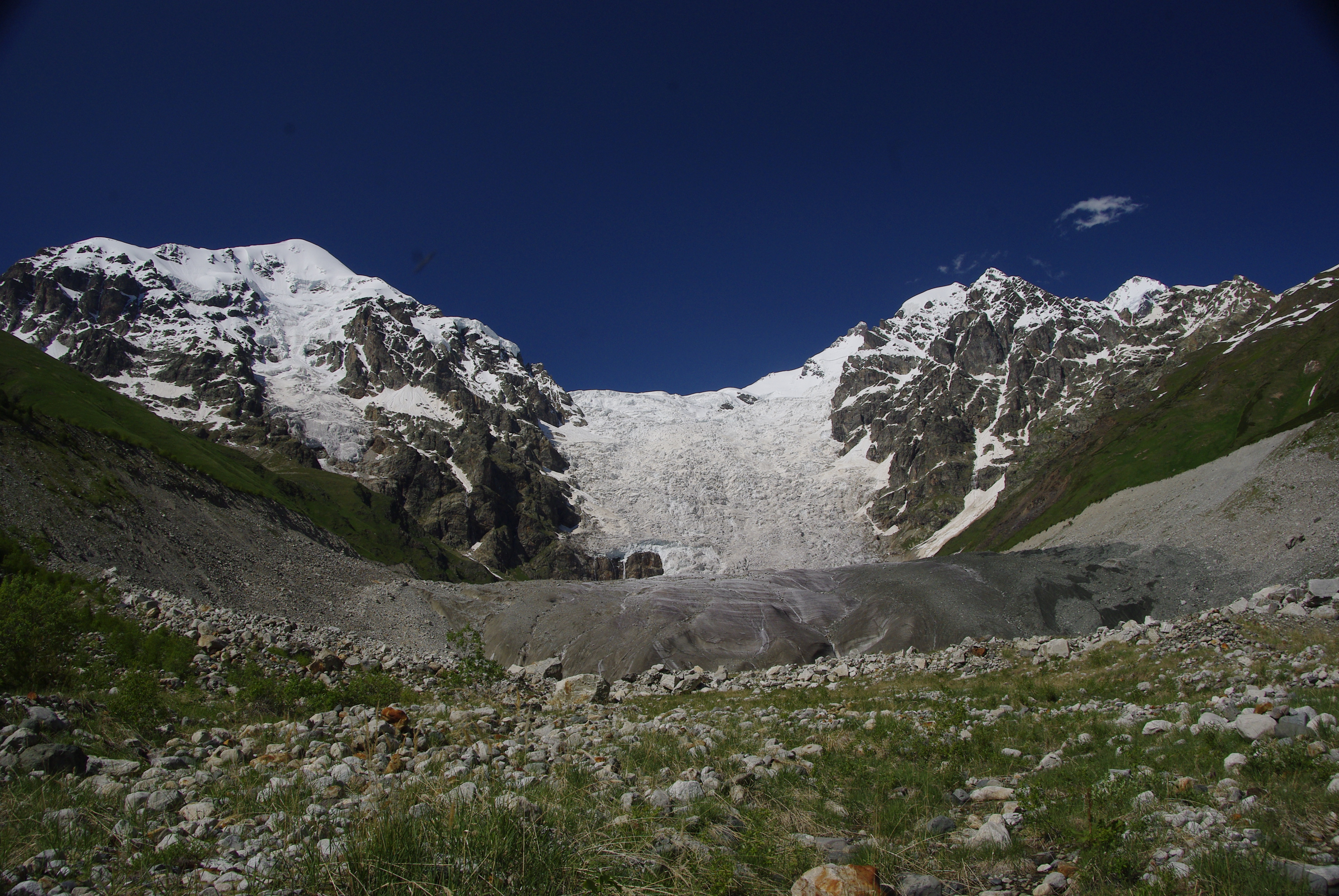
The Adishi Glacier

Glaciers in Georgia are mainly located along the Greater Caucasus Mountain Range.

== Geography ==
The spatial distribution of contemporary glaciers in the territory of Georgia is stipulated by the peculiarities of atmospheric processes, morphological-morphometric conditions of the relief and their interaction. Main centers of glaciation are related to the elevated Greater Caucasus watershed range and Kazbegi massif. Individual centers can be found in the Greater Caucasus branch ranges: Bzipi, Kodori, Samegrelo, Svaneti, Lechkhumi Range, Pirikita, etc. According to the data of 2015 there are 637 glaciers in Georgia with a total area of 355.80 km^{2}. Contemporary glaciers are mainly concentrated in the Enguri, Rioni, Kodori and Tergi River basins, where there are the peaks of 4500 m and higher. 89.32% of the amount and 97.15% of the area of glaciers of Georgia are located in these basins.

Contemporary glaciers are unevenly distributed between the different river basins. Here the leading place belongs to the Enguri River basin; 42.22% of the total number of the glaciers of Georgia is the share of it, as well as 62.78% of the total area of the glaciers of Georgia is a share of the Enguri River basin. Except the Enguri River basin the shares of the other river basins in the total number of the glaciers of Georgia are distributed as follows: the Kodori River basin – 22.76%; the Rioni River basin – 15.22%; the Tergi River basin - 9.10%; the Pirikita Alazani River basin – 3.19%; the Bzipi River basin – 2.82%; the Liakhvi River basin – 1.56% and the Khobistskali River basin – 1.41%. As for the basins of the rivers of Arghuni, Assa, Aragvi and Kelasuri, their joint share is 1.72% of the total number of the glaciers of Georgia. Except the Enguri River basin the shares of the other river basins in the total area of the glaciers of Georgia are distributed as follows: the Rioni River basin – 13.11%; the Kodori River basin – 11.25%; the Tergi River basin – 9.99%; the Bzipi River basin – 1.12%; the Pirikita Alazani River basin – 0.68%. As for the basins of the rivers of Liakhvi, Assa, Khobistskali, Arghuni, Aragvi and Kelasuri, their joint share is 1.07% of the total area of the glaciers of Georgia.

== Overview ==
Western Georgia features a fairly well-developed glacial system, with numerous glaciers occurring from the source of the Bzyb River in western Abkhazia to the Mamison Pass on the border with North Ossetia. The nation's largest glaciers lie in the Inguri River basin of this region. Eastern Georgia's glaciers generally occur in smaller, isolated groups. In addition, the mountain ranges that rise to the north of the Greater Caucasus Mountain Range are more glaciated than the adjacent ranges that branch out from the southern slopes of the Caucasus.

The line of glaciation ranges between 2,800–2,900 meters above sea level in western Georgia to 3,600 meters in extreme eastern Georgia, near Lagodekhi. The contrast occurs mainly due to differences in climate caused by a general west-east reduction in precipitation, which results in a more continental climate in parts of eastern Georgia.

== List of glaciers ==
Notable glaciers in Georgia include:

- Abano Glacier
- Adishi Glacier
- Devdaraki
- Dolra
- Gergeti
- Lahili Glacier
- Lekhziri Glacier
- Tsaneri Glacier
- Tviberi Glacier
- Chaladi Glacier

== History of research ==
Great Georgian scientist Prince Vakhushti of Kartli gives the first scientific information on the glaciers of Georgia in the beginning of the 18th century. [“There are big mountains, which have the Caucasus to the North from the Black Sea to the Caspian Sea, the height of which is of one day walking and the highest of it is permanently frosty, the length of the ice is of k-l arm, and in summer it breaks and, if a man stays there, he cannot endure the cold even for a little time; and under it the rivers flow, and the ice is green and red, as a rock due to its age”].

After almost hundred years the foreign scientists began to describe the glaciers of Georgia. Information about the glaciers of Georgia can be found in the works of von Abich (1865), Gustav Radde (1873), N. Dinnik (1884), N. Rashevskiy (1904), A. L. Reinhardt (1916, 1917) and others. This information is related to the individual glaciers and mostly is of descriptive nature. However, their findings greatly assist us in determining the dynamics of the individual glaciers.

In the years of 1880-1910 the topographical surveying of the Greater Caucasus was carried out. On the basis of the created maps K. I. Podozerskiy (1911) compiled the first detailed catalogue of the glaciers, which still has not lost its importance, but it must be mentioned, that the errors were made during its compilation. A. L. Reinhardt (1916, 1917) noted these errors further, who compiled the new catalogue for many glacial basins of the investigated region and defined the location of the snow line. The research conducted by A. Reinhardt is of high quality and more reliable by its scientific value in comparison with its previous researchers.

Interesting researches were conducted by F. Rutkovskaia (1936) in connection with the 2nd International Polar Year. In 1932-1933 the glaciations of the Enguri River was studied and the dynamics (in the one-year period) of the individual glaciers were identified. In 1959 P. A. Ivankov gave us the total number and area of glaciers of the study area based on the new topographic maps and the aeroimages of 1946. In the same year P. Kovalev (1961) described in details the glaciers and carried out their labeling. Much work has been conducted by D. Tsereteli for the study of the glaciers of Georgia, who in 1937 together with Al. Aslanikashvili surveyed several glaciers and in 1963 gave us the dynamics of the glaciers during the period of 1937-1960. Particularly should be mentioned the great and versatile work, which was done by the Glaciological Laboratory of Vakhushti Bagrationi Institute of Geography, the multiannual work of which is summarized in the 1975 year’s edition of the Catalogue of Glaciers, as well as by the Hydrographical Division of the Hydro-Meteorological Department, which published the work about the Glaciers of the Greater Caucasus (Editors: V. Tsomaia and E. Drobishev, 1970). It should be also noted the many years research of various glaciers in the major river basins by R. Gobejishvili. It can be considered his honor that after the 1990s the glaciological studies have not been stopped in Georgia. Levan Maruashvili, David Ukleba. T. Kikalishvili, G. Kurdghelaidze, D. Tabidze, R. Khazaradze, O. Nikolaishvili, V. Tsomaia, O. Drobishevi, R. Shengelia, R. Gobejishvili, K. Mgeladze, T. Lashkhi, Sh. Inashvili, N. Golodovskaia, L. Serebryannii, A. Orlov, O. Nadirashvili, N. Zakarashvili, A. Rekhviashvili, O. Samadbegishvili and others studied the glaciers of Georgia according to the river basins. Glacial-geomorphological works were being carried out from 1968 (R. Gobejishvili). The largest glaciers of the different river basins were surveyed by the phototheodolite method, such as: Zopkhito-Laboda, Kirtisho, Brili, Chasakhtomi, Edena, Khvargula, Boko, Buba, Tbilisa, Adishi, Chalaati, Dolra, Kvishi, Ladevali, Shkhara, Namkvani, Koruldashi, Marukhi, Klichi and the cirque type glaciers of the Klichi basin.

Today Glaciological group by the leadership of Levan Tielidze, every year conducts glaciological expeditions to the Caucasus glaciers in the different river basins.

== See also ==
- Glaciology
