= Gergeti =

Glacier in Georgia

Coordinates: 42°41′02″N 44°30′10″E

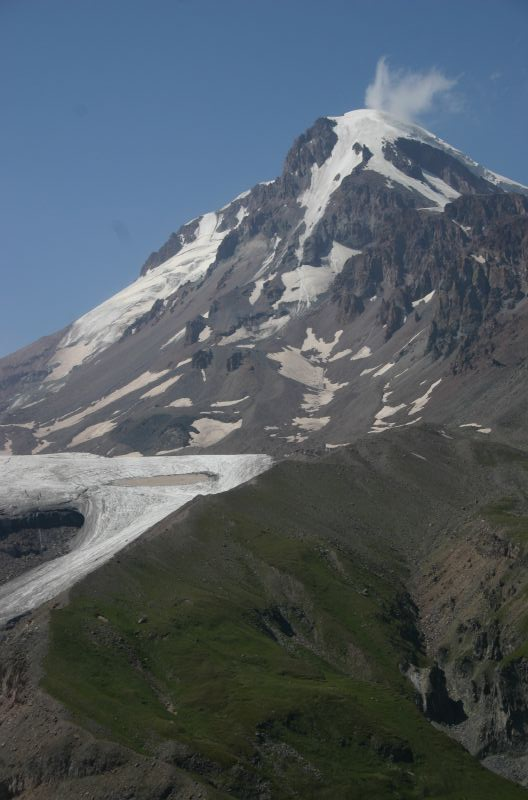
- View of a portion of the Gergeti Glacier within the caldera of Mt. Kazbek
- Interactive map of Gergeti
- Type: Valley glacier
- Location: Georgia
- Area: 11 km^{2} (2,718 acres)
- Length: 7.1 km (4 miles)

Gergeti (Georgian: გერგეთი; also known as Ortsveri) is a glacier located on the southeastern slope of Mt. Kazbek in the Kazbegi District of Georgia. The length of the Gergeti glacier is 7.1 km (4.4 mi) and its surface area is 11 km^{2} (4.2 sq mi). The tongue of Gergeti descends to 2,900 metres (9,500 ft) above sea level. Most of the glacier is located within an old and eroded volcanic caldera, where, at the edge of the caldera's northern rim, rises the cone of Mt. Kazbek. The southern rim of the caldera where the glacier descends, is bounded by Mount Ortsveri. There is a meteorological station located on the left edge of the Gergeti Glacier at an elevation of 3,650 m (11,980 ft) above sea level.

== See also ==
- Glaciers of Georgia
