= Lalveri =

Mountain in the Greater Caucasus Mountain Range

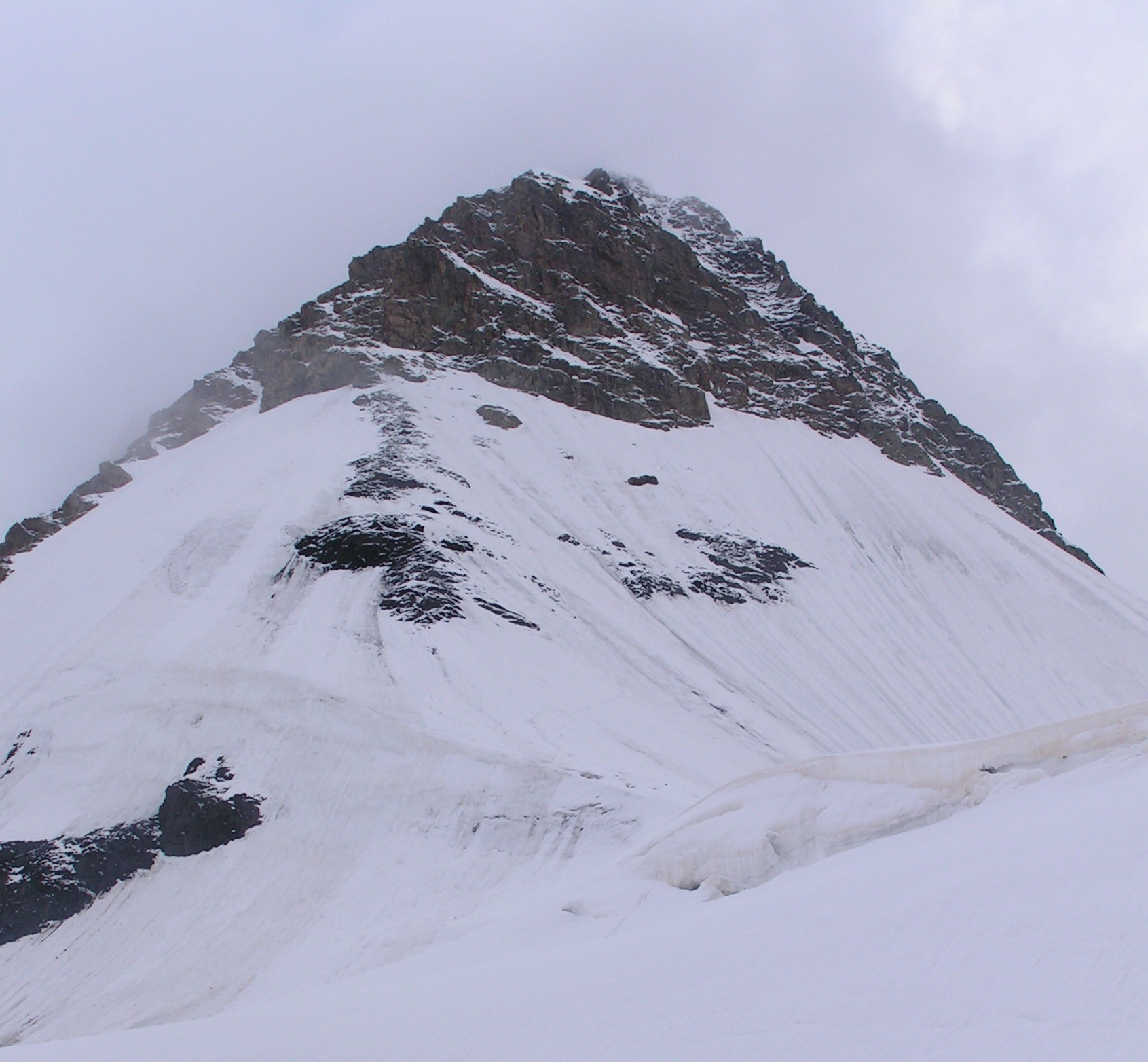
- View from Tsaneri pass.

Highest point
- Elevation: 4,350 m (14,270 ft)
- Prominence: 155 m (509 ft)
- Isolation: 1.67 km (1.04 mi)
- Listing: Ultra
- Coordinates: 43°04′15″N 43°00′58″E

Geography
- Location within Georgia
- Location: Georgia and Russia
- Countries: Georgia and Russia
- Parent range: Caucasus

Lalveri (Georgian: ლალვერი) is a peak of the Greater Caucasus Mountain Range in the Svaneti region of Georgia adjacent to the Georgia–Russia border. The elevation of the mountain is 4,350 meters (14,268 ft.) above sea level. The most accessible climbing route to the summit of Lalveri is through the Tsaneri Glacier.
