= Gistola =

Mountain in Georgia

- Gestola
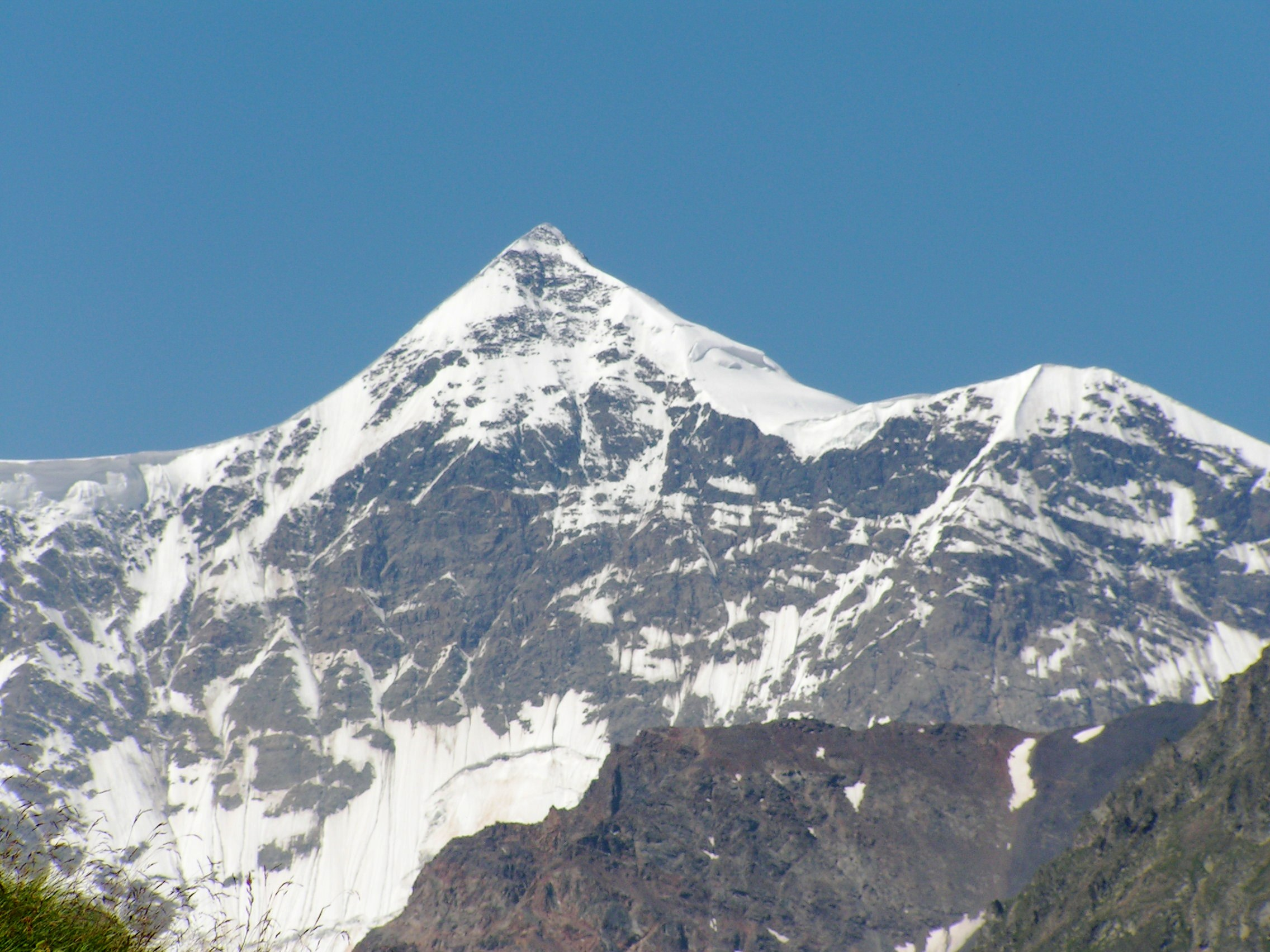

Highest point
- Elevation: 4,860 m (15,940 ft)
- Prominence: 320 m (1,050 ft)
- Isolation: 2.09 km (1.30 mi)
- Coordinates: 43°02′51.2″N 43°01′33.6″E

Naming
- Native name: გისტოლა (Georgian); Гестола (Karachay-Balkar)

Geography
- Location within Georgia
- Location: Kabardino-Balkaria, Russia / Svaneti, Georgia
- Country: Georgia / Russia
- Parent range: Greater Caucasus

Gistola (Georgian: გისტოლა; Karachay-Balkar: Гестола, romanized: Gestola) is a peak in the central part of the Greater Caucasus Mountain Range on Georgia–Russia border. The elevation of the mountain is 4,860 m (15,940 ft) above sea level. The mountain is made up of paleozoic granites. The slopes of Gistola are covered with ice.

== See also ==
- Adishi Glacier

== Sources ==
- Georgian State (Soviet) Encyclopedia. 1978. Book 3. p. 172.
