= Platigliole Glacier =

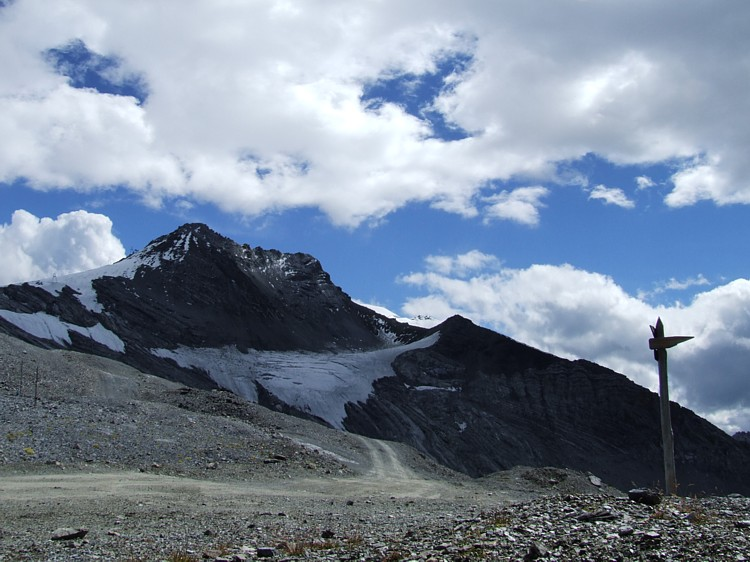
The Platigliole mountain pass

The Platigliole Glacier was a glacier in the Northern Italian Alps near to the border with Switzerland. It marked the border between Italian Lombardy and the Austro-Hungarian Empire until the First World War, when it was the scene of mountain warfare, during the White War. After the war the Treaty of Saint-Germain-en-Laye granted the glacier to Italy. The glacier fragmented later in the 20th century and by 2021 had largely melted, releasing artefacts from the war.

== Glaciological history ==
The Platigliole Glacier lay near the Platigliole Pass, a mountain pass of 2,908 metres (9,541 ft) elevation above sea level in the Stelvio National Park in Northern Italy. Platigliole lies in the Province of Sondrio, Lombardy, close to the border with Trentino-Alto Adige/Südtirol. It lies close to the modern border with Switzerland on the north-west face of a peak with altitude of 3,271 metres (10,732 ft). Historically, until the 1919 Treaty of Saint-Germain-en-Laye, the glacier marked the boundary between the Kingdom of Italy and the Austro-Hungarian Empire. Because of its political situation it was little-studied compared to other Alpine glaciers.

Historical maps show the Platigliole Glacier was joined to the Trafoi Glacier until around 1872. Meltwater from the glacier disappeared into karst sinkholes. In the 20th century the glacier reduced in size and split into four fragments. It had a total ice area of 0.59 square kilometres (0.23 sq mi) in 1954, 0.39 square kilometres (0.15 sq mi) in 1981, 0.27 square kilometres (0.10 sq mi) in 1990 and 0.17 square kilometres (0.066 sq mi) in 2003. The Italian Glacialogical Committee registered the glacier on 31 August 2006 and recorded the location as 46.511°N 10.454°E. The committee's survey noted the glacier had a maximum elevation of 3,165 metres (10,384 ft), a minimum elevation of 2,938 metres (9,639 ft) and a total length of 252 metres (827 ft). The surface area was recorded as 0.12 square kilometres (0.046 sq mi), this had fallen to 0.11 square kilometres (0.042 sq mi) when measured in 2007. The glacier was described as "largely melted" by 2021. The former extent of the glacier has been quickly vegetated, potentially assisted by the fine-grained moraine.

== First World War ==
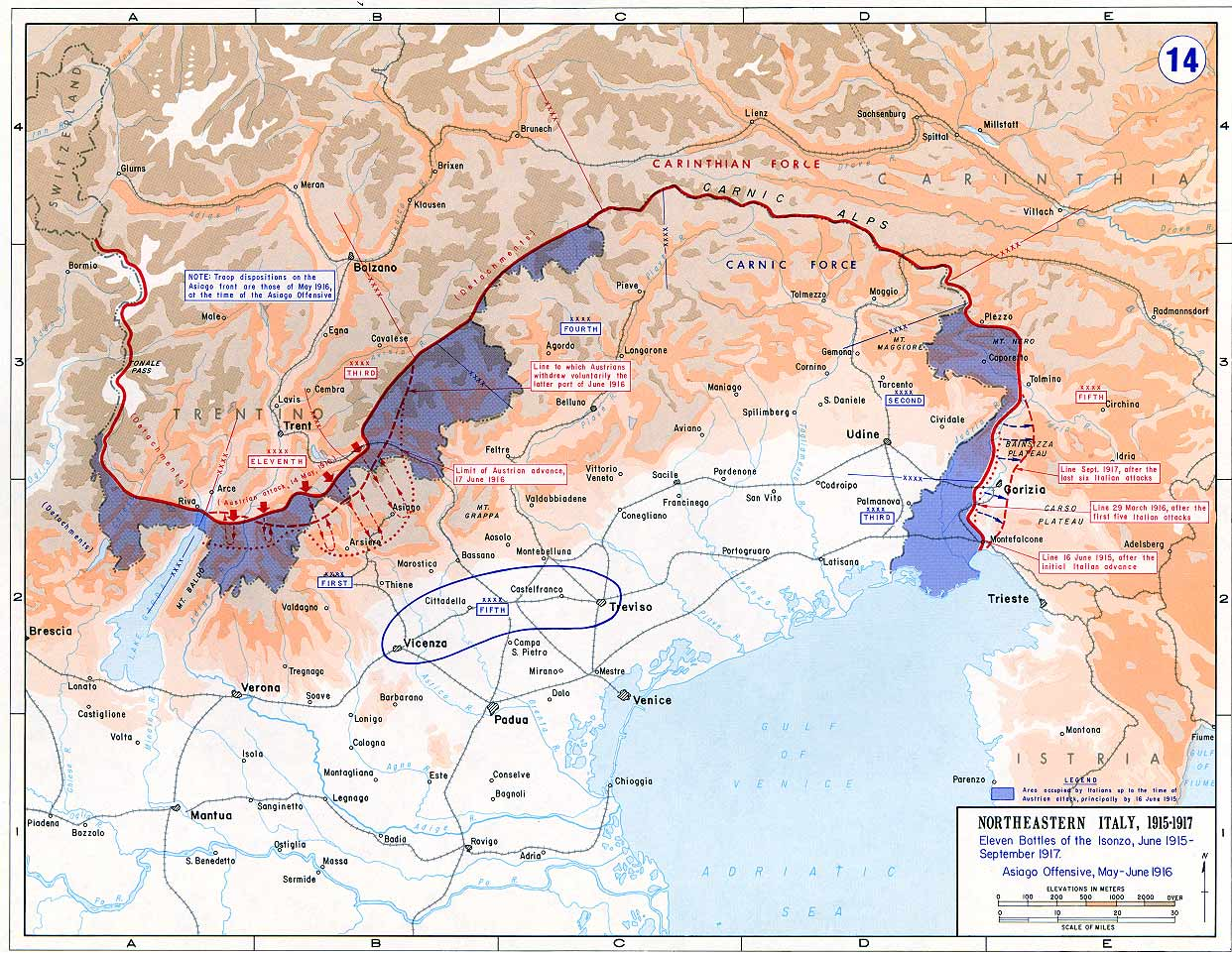
Map of the Italian Front 1915-17. Platigliole lies to the north-east of Bormio, close to the Swiss border.

The glacier was a site of combat during the First World War, as part of the so-called White War in the Alps. When Italy declared war on the Central Powers in May 1915 Austro-Hungarian troops moved quickly to occupy the high ground on the border. The frontier at Platigliole remained largely static, with Italian attempts to dislodge the Austro-Hungarians proving fruitless and costly. As elsewhere on the Italian Front both sides constructed fortifications and shelters in the mountains, at Platigliole some were dug into the glacier itself and reinforced with rocks and timber. At this location the opposing trench lines were less than 500 metres (1,600 ft) apart.

The melting of the glacier has revealed artefacts of the war, which has been described as one positive outcome of climate change. One particularly valuable find was a near-intact Austro-Hungarian platoon bunker. The structure survived structurally intact, though around half of it remains inaccessible due to persistent ice. Its contents included paper, clothing and hay bedding from its wartime occupants. The bunker was discovered in 2020 and, as of November 2021, was being studied by military historians. Any exposed artefacts needed to quickly be recovered and preserved as organic material soon decomposes when defrosted. A number of trench lines have also been discovered.
