= Tetnuldi =

Mountain in Georgia

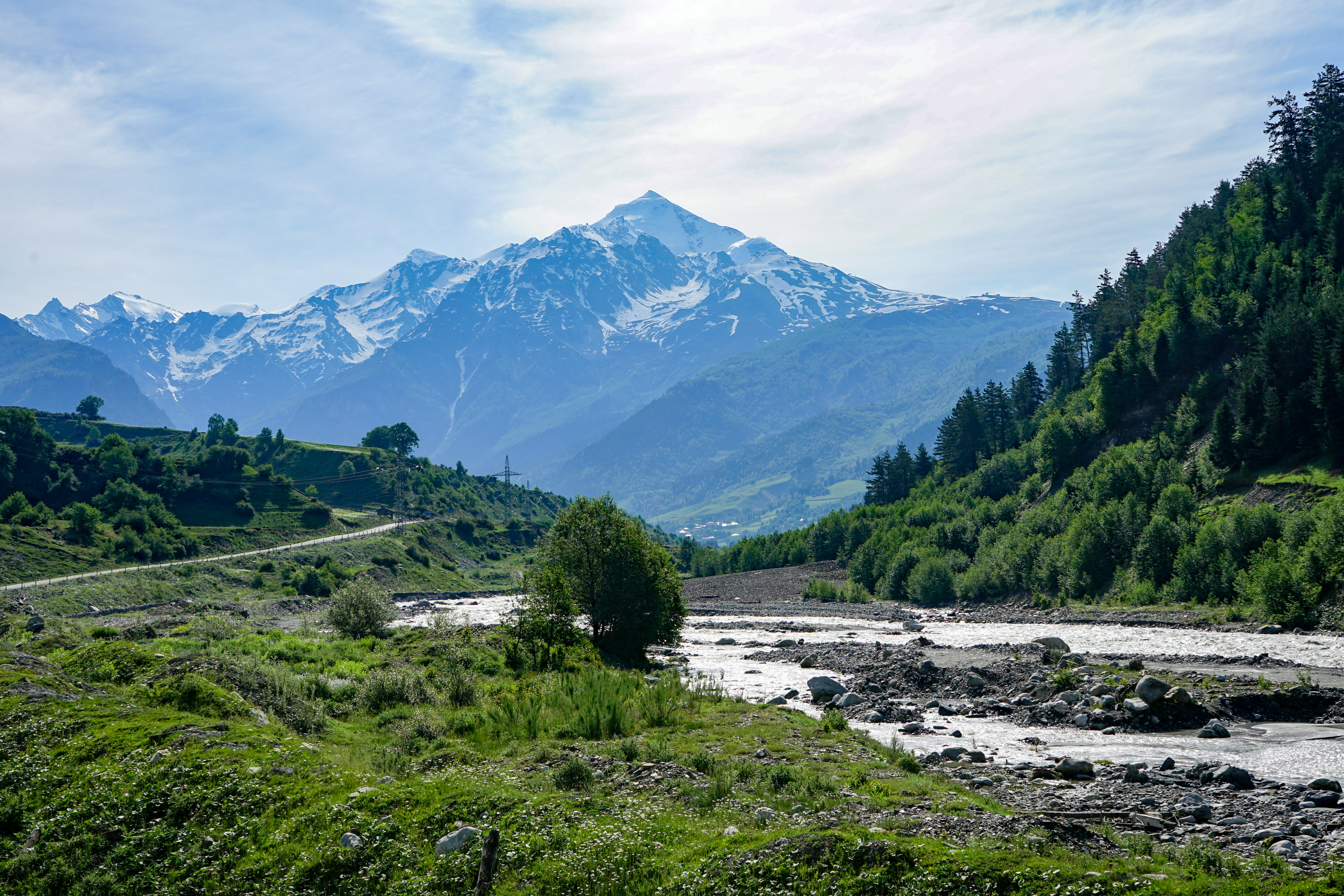
- View of Tetnuldi, with the river Mulkhra in the foreground.

Highest point
- Elevation: 4,858 m (15,938 ft)
- Prominence: 672 m (2,205 ft)
- Isolation: 3.33 km (2.07 mi)
- Coordinates: 43°01′52″N 42°59′35″E

Geography
- Location within Caucasus Mountains Location within Samegrelo-Zemo Svaneti
- Location: Svaneti, Georgia
- Country: Georgia
- Parent range: Caucasus Mountains

Climbing
- Easiest route: basic snow/ice climb

Tetnuldi (Georgian: თეთნულდი) is a prominent peak in the central part of the Greater Caucasus Mountain Range, located in the Svaneti region of Georgia. According to most sources, Tetnuldi is the 10th highest peak of the Caucasus. The slopes of the mountain are glaciated generally above the 3,000 metre (9,840 ft) line. The most prominent glacier of the mountain is called Adishi.

It was first climbed by Douglas Freshfield in 1896. The first ascent of the north face was completed by Michael S. Taylor and John R. Jenkins.

New ski resort in Tetnuldi was opened during 2015-2016 winter season.

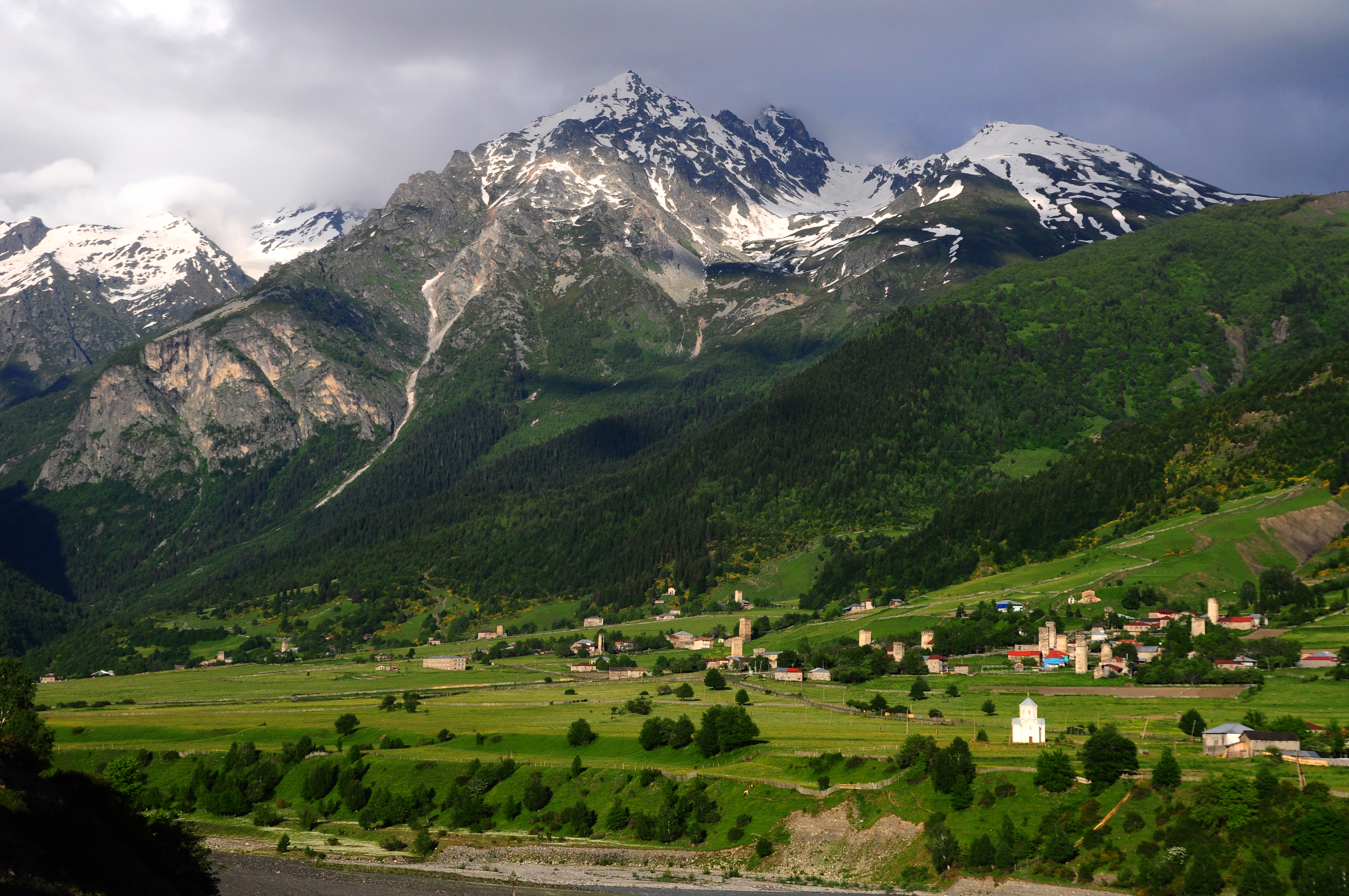
Tetnuldi rising above the village Latali
