= Tsijiore Nouve Glacier =

Glacier in Switzerland

Coordinates: 46°0′28″N 7°27′23″E

The Tsijiore Nouve Glacier (French: Glacier de Tsijiore Nouve) is a 4 km (2.5 mi) long glacier (2005) situated in the Pennine Alps in the canton of Valais in Switzerland. In 1973 it had an area of 3.2 km^{2} (1.2 sq mi).

== See also ==
- List of glaciers in Switzerland
- Swiss Alps
