= Severny Island ice cap =

Russian Glacier

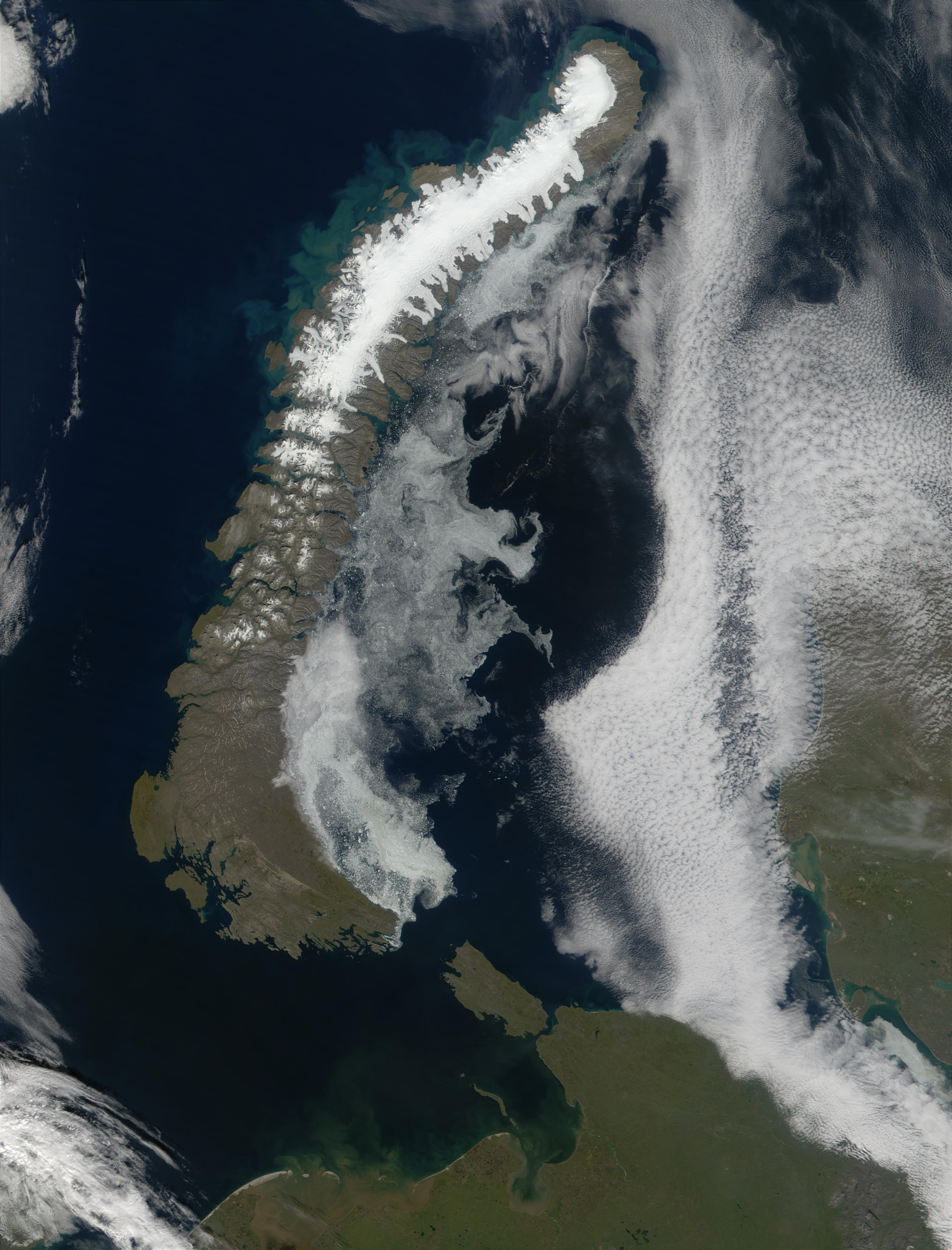
- Interactive map of Severny Island ice cap
- Location: Severny Island, Novaya Zemlya, Russian Federation
- Coordinates: 75°30′N 60°00′E
- Area: 18,661 km^{2} (7,210 sq mi)
- Length: 400 km (250 mi)
- Width: 50 km (30 mi)

Severny Island ice cap is an ice cap on Severny Island, northern island of the Novaya Zemlya archipelago in Russia. It covers approximately 40% of Severny Island (which is the 30th largest island in the world) at total area (per 2021) of 18,661 km^{2} (7,205 sq mi) which, if Novaya Zemlya is considered within Europe, makes it the largest glacier by area in Europe ahead of Vatnajökull at 8,100 km^{2} (3,100 sq mi), and Austfonna at 7,800 km^{2} (3,000 sq mi).

== Glaciers ==
A number of glaciers flow from the inner ice cap to Severny Island's coastline. Mount Kruzenshtern, the highest point of Novaya Zemlya, rises on the western edge of the Severny Island ice cap, near the head of the Glazov Glacier.

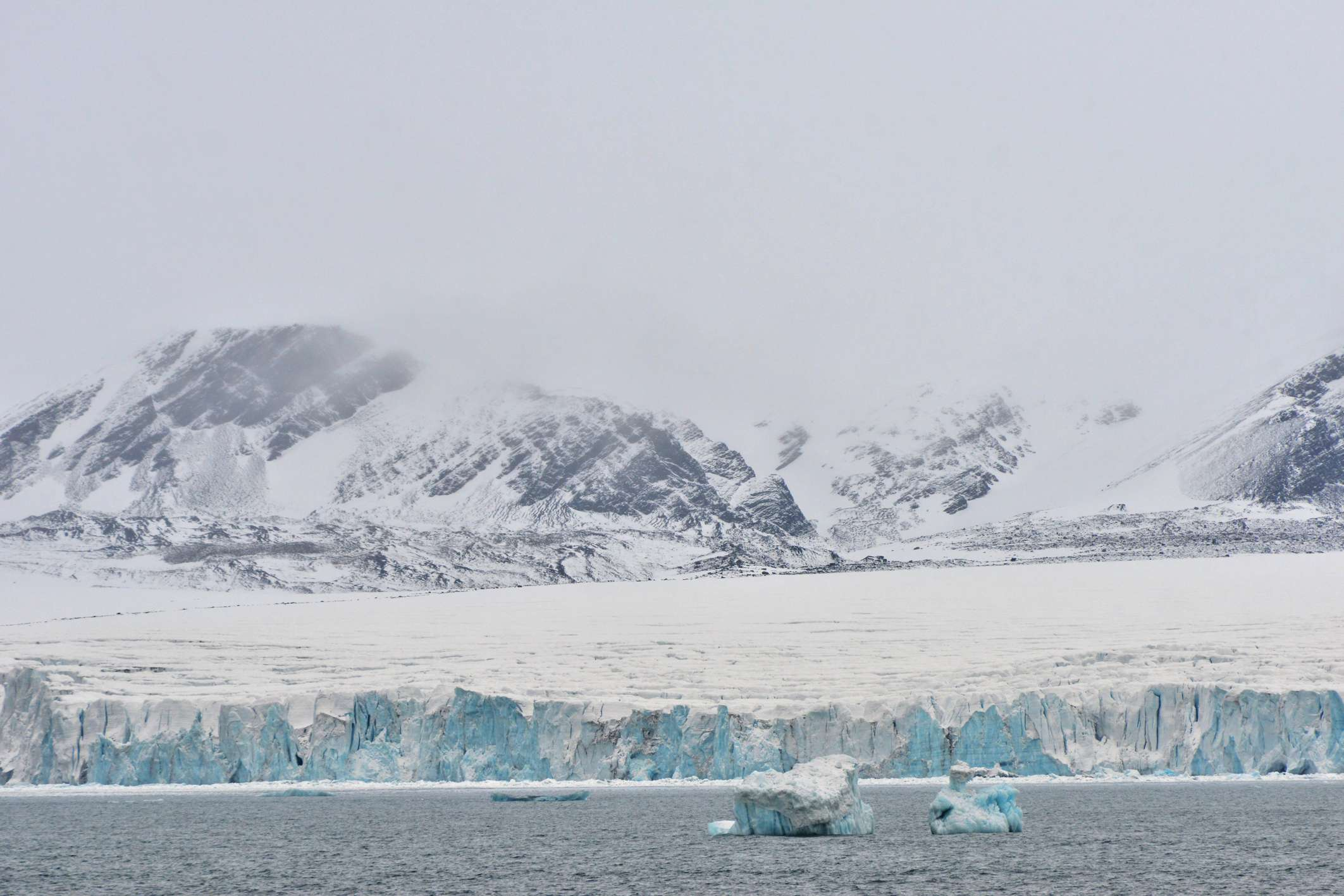
View of Inostrantsev Glacier (Lednik Inostrantseva). West coast.

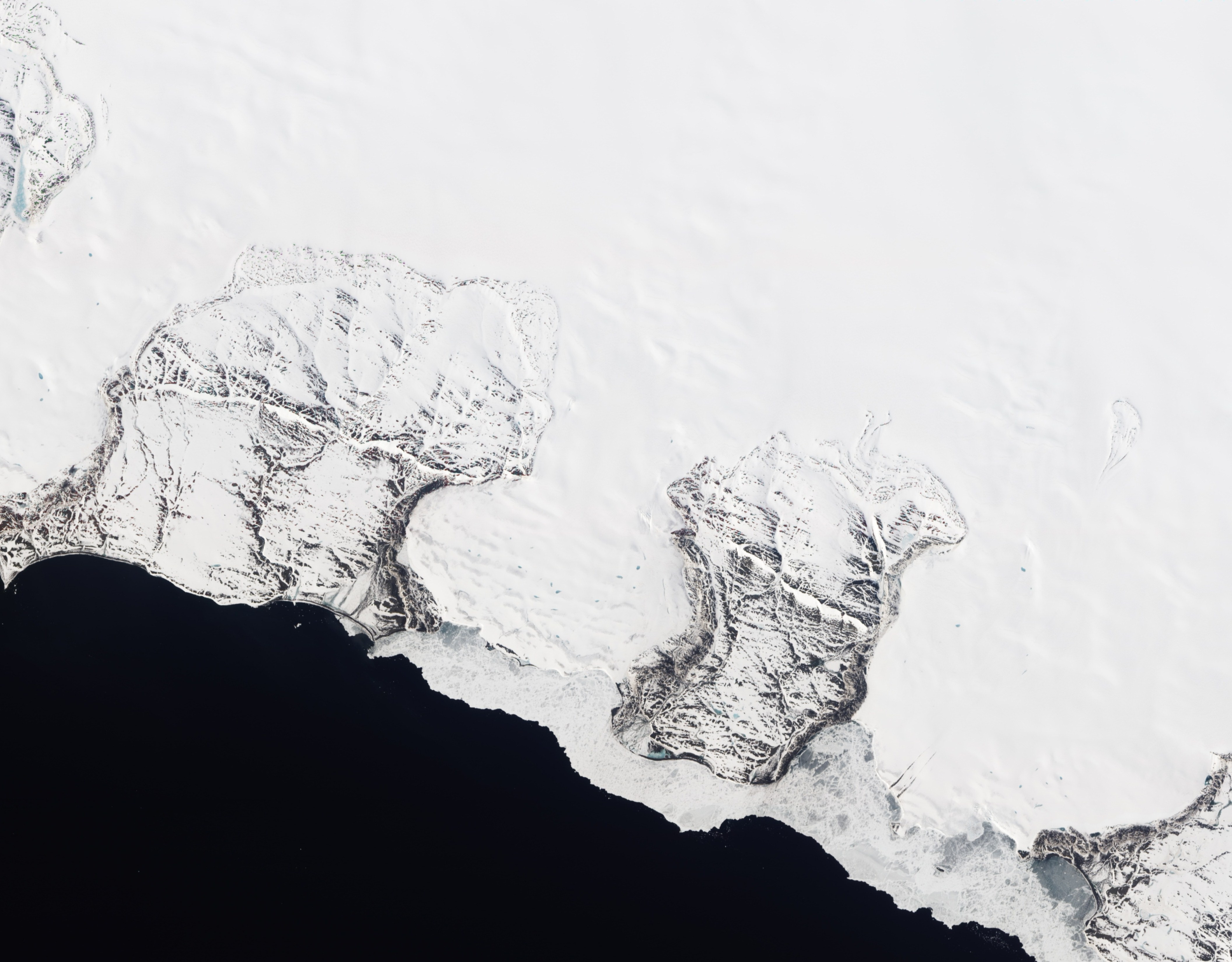
NASA picture of Rozhdestvensky (left), Novopashenny (middle) and Roze glaciers of the Nordenskiöld Glacier group. East coast.

=== West coast ===
The following glaciers have their terminus on the coast of the Barents Sea.

- Anna Glacier (Lednik Anny)
- Anuchin Glacier (Lednik Anuchina)
- Arkhangel Bay Glacier (Lednik Arkhangel'skoy Guby)
- Brounov Glacier (Lednik Brounova)
- Borzov Glacier (Lednik Borzova)
- Bull Glacier (Lednik Bull)
- Bunge Glacier (Lednik Bunge)
- Chayev Glacier (Lednik Chayeva)
- Chernishev Glacier (Lednik Chernishëva)
- Glazov Glacier (Lednik Glazov)
- Inostrantsev Glacier (Lednik Inostrantseva)
- Karbasnikov Glacier (Lednik Karbasnikova)
- Krayniy Glacier (Lednik Krayniy)
- Lakrua Glacier (Lednik Lakrua)
- Mack Glacier (Lednik Maka)
- Nizkiy Glacier (Lednik Nizkiy)
- Pavlov Glacier (Lednik Pavlova)
- Petersen Glacier (Lednik Petersena)
- Popov Glacier (Lednik Popova)
- Rikachev Glacier (Lednik Rykachëva)
- Severnyy Glacier (Lednik Severnyy)
- Shirokiy Glacier (Lednik Shirokiy)
- Shokalsky Glacier (Lednik Shokal'skogo)
- Taisiya Glacier (Lednik Taisiya)
- Velken Glacier (Lednik Vel'kena)
- Vera Glacier (Lednik Vera)
- Vize Glacier (Lednik Vize)
- Voyekov Glacier (Lednik Voyekova)
- Yuzhnyy Glacier (Lednik Yuzhnyy)

=== East coast ===
The following glaciers have their terminus on the coast of the Kara Sea.

- Goluboy Glacier (Lednik Goluboy)
- Kropotkin Glacier (Lednik Kropotkina)
- Moschnyy Glacier (Lednik Moschnyy)
- Nansen Glacier (Lednik Nansena)
- Polisadov Glacier (Lednik Polisadova)
- Serp i Molot Glacier (Lednik Serp i Molot)
- Vitte Glacier (Lednik Vitte)
- Nordenskiöld Glacier (Lednik Nordenshel'da), group of four glaciers:
  - Vershinsky Glacier (Lednik Vershinskogo)
  - Novopashenny Glacier (Lednik Novopashennogo), also known as Lednik Sredniy
  - Rozhdestvensky Glacier (Lednik Rozhdestvenskogo)
  - Roze Glacier (Lednik Roze)

=== Other glaciers ===
- Lednikovoye Glaciers with their terminus in Lednikovoye Lake

== Nunataks ==
Gora Severny Nunatak is a nunatak located in the northern section of the long ice cap not far from the western coast of the island. Further to the northeast there is another nunatak between the two outlets of the Bunge Glacier.

== See also ==
- List of glaciers in Europe
- List of glaciers in Russia
- List of fjords of Russia
