= Tviberi Glacier =

Glacier in Georgia

Tviberi
- Location within Samegrelo-Zemo Svaneti Location within Georgia
- Interactive map of Tviberi
- Type: Valley glacier
- Location: Svaneti, Georgia
- Coordinates: 43.1228°N 42.8575°E
- Area: 27.9 km^{2} (6,894 acres)
- Length: 9.5 km^{2} (2,348 acres)

Tviberi (Georgian: ტვიბერი) is a glacier located in the Svaneti Region of Georgia on the southern slopes of the Greater Caucasus Mountain Range. The length of the Tviberi Glacier is 9.5 km (5.9 mi) and its surface area is 27.9 km^{2} (10.8 sq mi). The tongue of the glacier descends to 2,150 metres (7,050 ft) above sea level. Tviberi represents a polisynthetic type of a valley glacier. It has many tributaries among which are Laskhedari, Iriti, Asmashi, Toti, Seri and others. The surface of Tviberi is mainly covered with morainal sediments and debris. The glacier feeds off of the runoff and ice flows from the adjacent peaks. The nearest larger community is Mestia, 13.5 km southwest of Tviberi Glacier. The area around Tviberi Glacier consists mainly of grassland.

== See also ==
- Glaciers of Georgia
