= Glacier morphology =

Geomorphology of glaciers

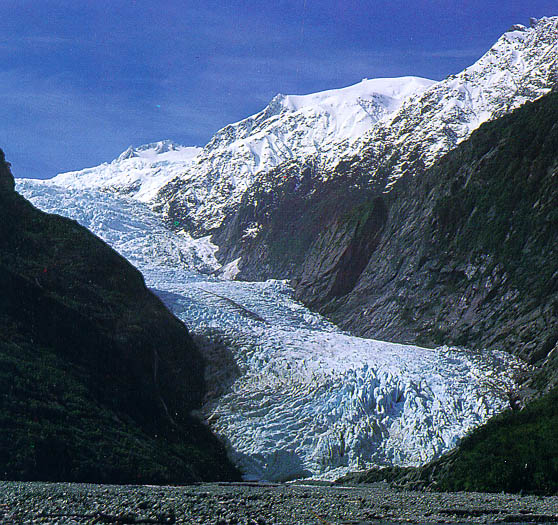
Franz Josef Glacier in New Zealand

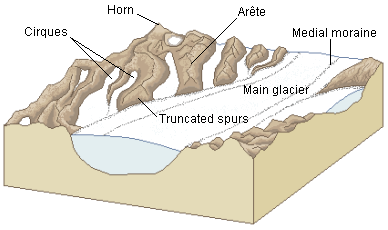
Features of a glacial landscape

Glacier morphology, or the form a glacier takes, is influenced by temperature, precipitation, topography, and other factors. The goal of glacial morphology is to gain a better understanding of glaciated landscapes and the way they are shaped. Types of glaciers can range from massive ice sheets, such as the Greenland ice sheet, to small cirque glaciers found perched on mountain tops. Glaciers can be grouped into two main categories:

- Ice flow is constrained by the underlying bedrock topography
- Ice flow is unrestricted by surrounding topography

== Unconstrained Glaciers ==
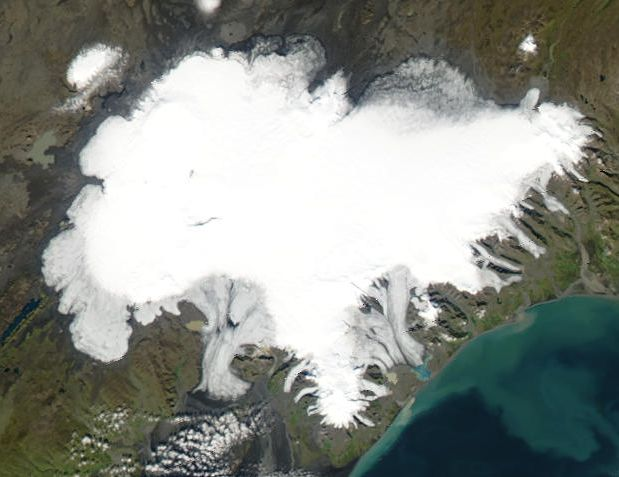
Vatnajökull ice cap in Iceland

=== Ice sheets and ice caps ===
Ice sheets and ice caps cover the largest areas of land in comparison to other glaciers, and their ice is unconstrained by the underlying topography. They are the largest glacial ice formations and hold the vast majority of the world's fresh water.

==== Ice sheets ====
Ice sheets are the largest form of glacial formation. They are continent-sized ice masses that span areas over 50,000 square kilometers (19,000 square miles). They are dome-shaped and, like ice caps, exhibit radial flow. As ice sheets expand over the ocean, they become ice shelves. Ice sheets contain 99% of all the freshwater ice found on Earth, and form as layers of snowfall accumulate and slowly start to compact into ice. There are only two ice sheets present on Earth today: the Antarctic ice sheet and the Greenland ice sheet. Although only a tenth of modern Earth is covered by ice sheets, the Pleistocene epoch was characterized by ice sheets that covered a third of the planet. This was also known as the Last Glacial Maximum.

==== Ice caps ====
An ice cap can be defined as a dome-shaped mass of ice that exhibits a radial flow. They are often easily confused with ice sheets, but these ice structures are smaller than 50,000 km^{2}, and obscure the entirety of the topography they span. They mainly form in polar and sub-polar regions with particularly high elevation but flat ground. Ice caps can be round, circular, or irregular in shape. Ice caps often gradually merge into ice sheets making them difficult to track and document. Examples include:

- Jostedal Glacier, Norway
- Devon Ice Cap, Canada
- Barnes Ice Cap, Canada
- Vatnajökull, Iceland
- Flade Isblink, Greenland

=== Ice domes ===
An ice dome is a part of an ice cap or ice sheet that is characterized by upstanding ice surface located in the accumulation zone. Ice domes are nearly symmetrical, with a convex or parabolic surface shape. They tend to develop evenly over a land mass that may be either a topographic height or a depression, often reflecting the sub-glacial topography. In ice sheets, domes may reach a thickness that may exceed 3,000 meters (9,800 feet). However, in ice caps, the thickness of the dome is much smaller, measuring roughly up to several hundred metres in comparison. In glaciated islands, ice domes are usually the highest point of the ice cap. An example of an ice dome is Kupol Vostok Pervyy in Alger Island, Franz Josef Land, Russia.

=== Ice streams ===
Ice streams rapidly channel ice flow out to the sea, ocean, or an ice shelf. For this reason, they are commonly referred to as the "arteries" of an ice sheet. Ice from continental sheets is drained into the ocean by a complex network of ice streams, and their activity is greatly affected by oceanic and atmospheric processes. They feature a higher velocity in the centre of the stream, and are bounded by slow-moving ice on either side. Periods of greater ice stream flow result in more ice transfer from ice sheets to the ocean, raising sea level. At the margin between glacial ice and water, ice calving takes place as glaciers begin to fracture, and icebergs break off from the large masses of ice. Iceberg calving is a major contributor to sea level rise, but the ocean is not the only place that can experience ice calving. Calving can also take place in lakes, fjords, and continental ice cliffs.

== Constrained glaciers ==
=== Icefields ===
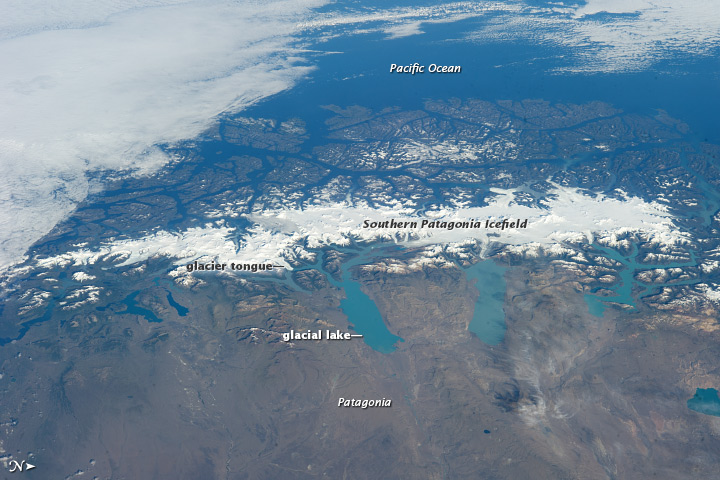
Southern Patagonia Ice Field from ISS, astronaut photo. North is to the right.

An icefield is an example of glacier structure that covers a relatively large area, and is usually located in mountain terrain. Icefields are quite similar to ice caps; however, their morphology is much more influenced by the underlying mountainous topography.

The rock formations found under the icefields are variable, and rocky mountain peaks known as nunataks tend to jut out from under the surface of icefields. Examples include:

- Columbia Icefield, Canada
- Juneau Icefield, Canada / Alaska, United States
- Southern Patagonian Ice Field, Chile and Argentina
- Harding Icefield, Alaska, United States

=== Outlet glaciers ===
Outlet glaciers are often found in valleys, and they originate from major ice sheets and ice caps. They move in a singular direction that is determined by the underlying landscape. Outlet glaciers drain inland glaciers through gaps found in the surrounding topography. A higher amount of inland glacial melt ultimately increases the amount of outlet glacier output. Studies predict that outlet glaciers found in Greenland can increase the global sea level considerably following an increase in global temperature, and a subsequently higher drainage output. Examples include:

- Helheim Glacier, Greenland
- Kangerlussuaq Glacier, Greenland
- Jakobshavn Glacier, Greenland
- Petermann Glacier, Greenland

=== Valley glaciers ===
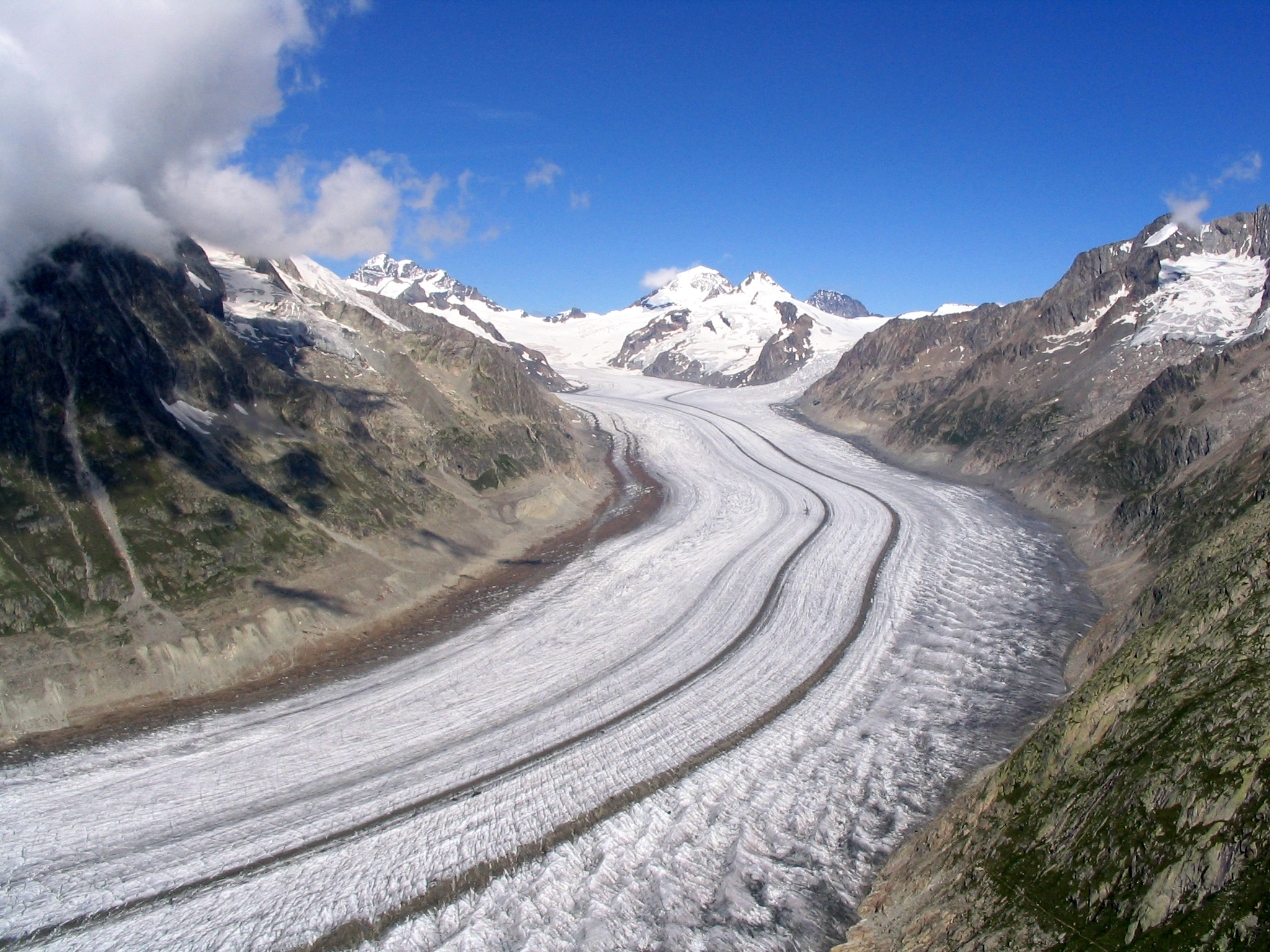
Grosser Aletschgletscher, Bernese Alps, Switzerland

Valley glaciers are outlet glaciers that provide drainage for ice fields, icecaps or ice sheets. The flow of these glaciers is confined by the walls of the valley they are found in; but they may also form in mountain ranges as gathering snow turns to ice. The formation of valley glaciers is restricted by formations such as terminal moraines, which are collections of till (unconsolidated rock material) deposited by the terminus of the glacier. Ice-free exposed bedrock and slopes often surround valley glaciers, providing a route for snow and ice to accumulate on the glacier via avalanches. Examples include:

- Sermilik Glacier, Canada
- Fláajökull, Iceland
- Tviberi Glacier, Georgia

==== Valley-head glaciers ====
Valley head glaciers are types of valley glaciers that are only limited to the valley head. An example of this type of valley glacier is Bægisárjökull, found in Iceland, which does not markedly extend into the valley below it.

==== Fjords ====
True fjords are formed when valley glaciers retreat and seawater fills the now empty valley. They can be found in mountainous, glaciation-affected terrain. Examples include:

- Hvalfjörður, Iceland
- Hornsund, Svalbard
- Sognefjord, Norway
- An existing valley glacier of this type is Jakobshavn Glacier in Greenland

==== Piedmont glaciers ====
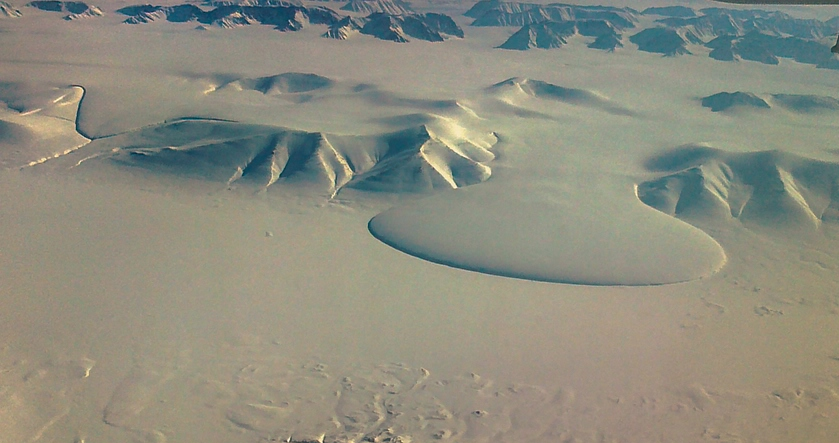
Elephant Foot Glacier, a well-known Piedmont glacier in Romer Lake, northeastern Greenland.

Piedmont glaciers are a sub-type of valley glaciers which have flowed out onto lowland plains, where they spread out into a fan-like shape. Examples include:

- Malaspina Glacier, Alaska, United States
- Endeavor Piedmont Glacier, Antarctica

==== Cirque glaciers ====
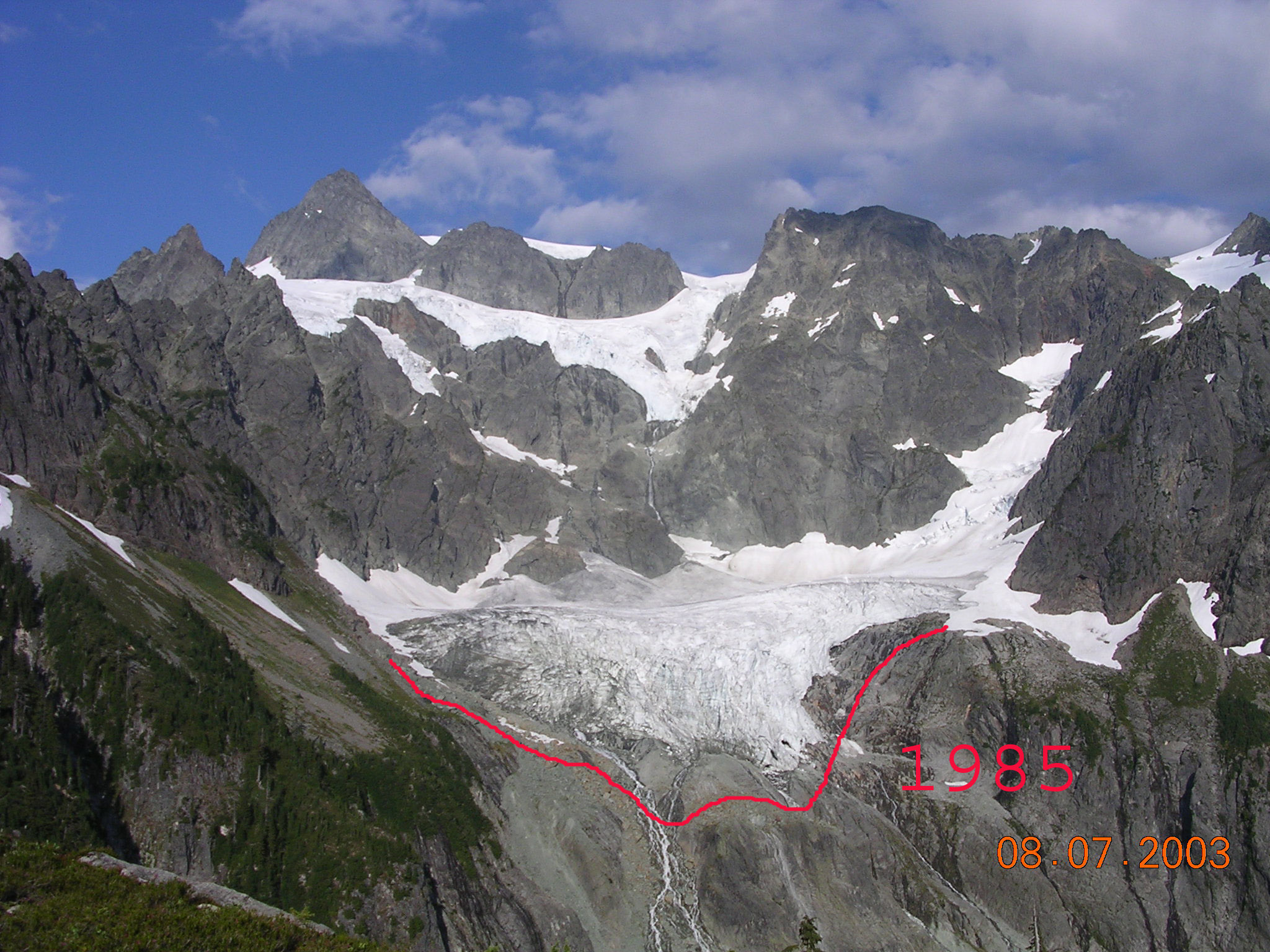
Lower Curtis Glacier is a cirque glacier in the North Cascades in the U.S. state of Washington.

Cirque glaciers are glaciers that appear in bowl-shaped valley hollows. Snow easily settles in the topographic structure; it is turned to ice as more snow falls and is subsequently compressed. When the glacier melts, a cirque structure is left in its place. Examples include:

- Lower Curtis Glacier, Washington, United States
- Eel Glacier, Washington, United States

==== Hanging glacier ====
A hanging glacier appears in a hanging valley, and has the potential to break off from the side of the mountain it is attached to. As bits and pieces of hanging glaciers break off and begin to fall, avalanches can be triggered. Examples include:

- Eiger Glacier, Switzerland
- Angel Glacier, Canada

== Sources ==
- Benn, Douglas I.; Evans, David J.A. (2010). Glaciers & Glaciation (2nd ed.). Abingdon, UK: Hodder. ISBN 978-0-340-905791.
