= Andrei Durnovtsev =

Soviet Air Force pilot (1923–1976)

Andrey Yegorovich Durnovtsev
- Native name: Андрей Егорович Дурновцев
- Born: 14 January 1923; Verkhnye Kuryaty village, Yeniseysk Governorate, RSFSR
- Died: 24 October 1976 (aged 53) Kiev, Ukrainian SSR, USSR
- Allegiance: Soviet Union
- Branch: Soviet Air Force
- Service years: 1942–1962
- Rank: Lieutenant colonel
- Awards: Hero of the Soviet Union

Andrei Yegorovich Durnovtsev (Russian: Андрей Егорович Дурновцев) was a Soviet lieutenant colonel who was awarded Hero of the Soviet Union. Born in 1923, in the village of Upper Kuryaty, part of the Karatuzsky District of Krasnoyarsk Krai, he was a pilot of the Soviet Air Force. In July 1942, Andrei was drafted into the Red Army. One year later, he would graduate from the Irkutsk Higher Military Aviation Engineering School and from the Engels Military Aviation School in 1948. He was appointed Lead nuclear weapons test pilot, in charge of dropping the Tsar Bomba as part of the Nuclear weapons testing program of the Soviet Union.

The test took place on October 30, 1961 At Cape Sukhoi Nos, 15 km (9.3 mi) from Mityushikha Bay, north of Matochkin Strait, at 11:33 am. The tests were monitored by a government commission headed by Marshal of the Soviet Union Kirill Moskalenko. He flew a specially modified Tu-95V which utilized special white paint to reflect the enormous amount of heat radiation given off by the Tsar Bomba's fusion reaction; the release plane was accompanied by a Tu-16 observer plane that took air samples and filmed the test. He was promoted to Lt. Colonel after the mission and named a Hero of the Soviet Union. He was also awarded the Order of the Red Star, among 13 other medals
