= Sukhoy Nos =

Cape on Severny, Novaya Zemlya, Russia

Sukhoy Nos Сухой Нос
- Cape
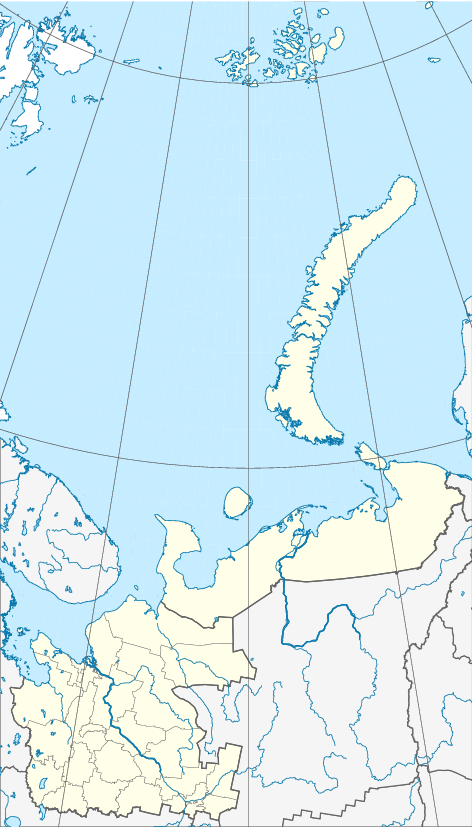
- Location within Arkhangelsk Oblast
- Coordinates: 73.787287°N 53.712845°E
- Location: Severny Island, Novaya Zemlya; Arkhangelsk Oblast, Russian Federation
- Water bodies: Barents Sea

Sukhoy Nos (Russian: Сухой Нос, lit. 'Dry Nose') is a cape on Severny Island, the northern island of the archipelago Novaya Zemlya in the Northern Arctic Ocean, projecting westward into the Barents Sea.

It was the location for the detonation of the most powerful bomb ever built – the 50-megaton hydrogen bomb Tsar Bomba – in October 1961.

== Location ==
The site lies near the southwestern corner of the island, 15 km (9.3 mi) from Mityushikha Bay, north of Matochkin Strait, which separates Severny from Yuzhny Island, the southern island of the archipelago.

Sukhoy Nos is located within the Russian Arctic National Park, a protected area of approximately 74,000 km^{2}, 16,000 km^{2} in land area and 58,000 km^{2} in sea area.

The cape is composed of black and reddish shale. Underwater sandbars are located off its northern shore. In the 19th century, numerous birds nested on the steep cliffs, particularly loons.

== History ==
Sukhoy Nos was one of three sites of nuclear testing in Novaya Zemlya for the former Soviet Union. It was the third and the northernmost detonating site of three on the archipelago. Sukhoy Nos was designated Zone C.

The Soviet Union conducted more than 200 nuclear tests between 1955 and 1990. Sukhoy Nos was used for testing between 1958 and 1961.

On 30 October 1961, the record-breaking Tsar Bomba was tested over Sukhoy Nos. The 50-megaton hydrogen bomb destroyed every building within 55 km of Sukhoy Nos and several others for over 100 km away.

Very few people have been allowed to visit the site due to the radiation from Tsar Bomba. Military guards accompany visitors who are forbidden from taking souvenirs. GPS or Geiger counters are also prohibited.
