= Avgust Tsivolko =

Russian explorer (1810–1839)

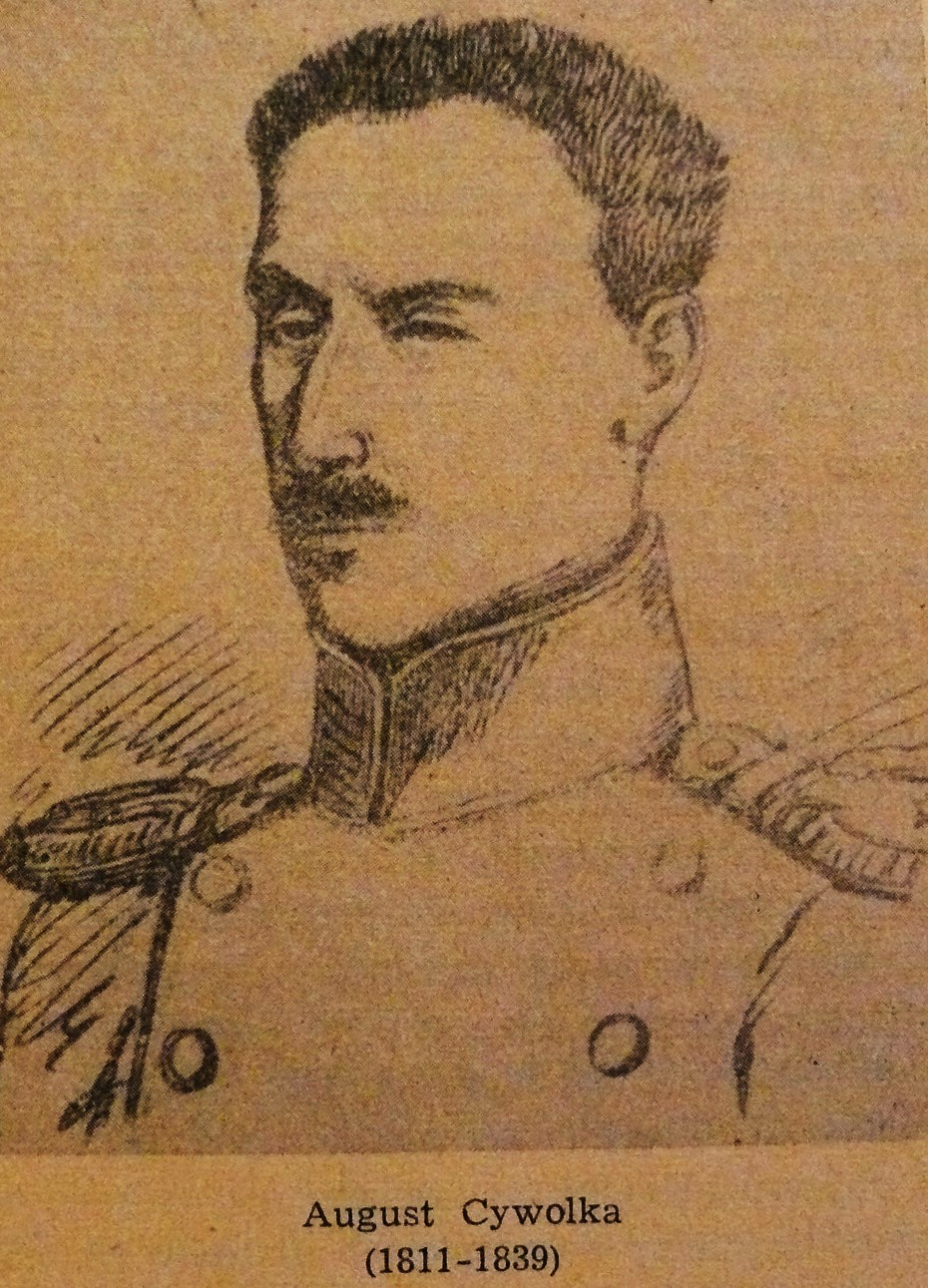
- Born: 1810
- Died: March 28, 1839 (aged 28–29)
- Occupations: Navigator; Arctic explorer

Avgust Karlovich Tsivolko (also spelled Tsivolka; Russian: Август Карлович Циволько; 1810 – 28 March [O.S. 16 March] 1839) was a Russian navigator and Arctic explorer.

== Career ==
In 1834–1835, Avgust Tsivolko took part in the Pakhtusov expedition towards Novaya Zemlya. They charted the entire east coast of Yuzhny Island and much of the east coast of Severny Island. In 1837, Tsivolko commanded a schooner named Krotov during the Baer expedition towards Novaya Zemlya. He was the one to map the Matochkin Strait in the course of this expedition. In 1838 Tsivolko was put in charge of the mapping expedition and sent towards the northern shores of Novaya Zemlya. Avgust Tsivolko died of scurvy during this expedition.

== Legacy ==
A gulf in the Kara Sea and a group of islands in the Nordenskiöld Archipelago are named after Avgust Tsivolko.

== Sources ==
- "Циволька, Август Карлович" . Brockhaus and Efron Encyclopedic Dictionary (in Russian). 1906.
