= Extreme points of Europe =

This is a list of the extreme points of Europe: the geographical points that are higher or farther north, south, east or west than any other location in Europe. Some of these positions are open to debate, as the definition of Europe is diverse.

== Extremes of the European continent, including islands ==
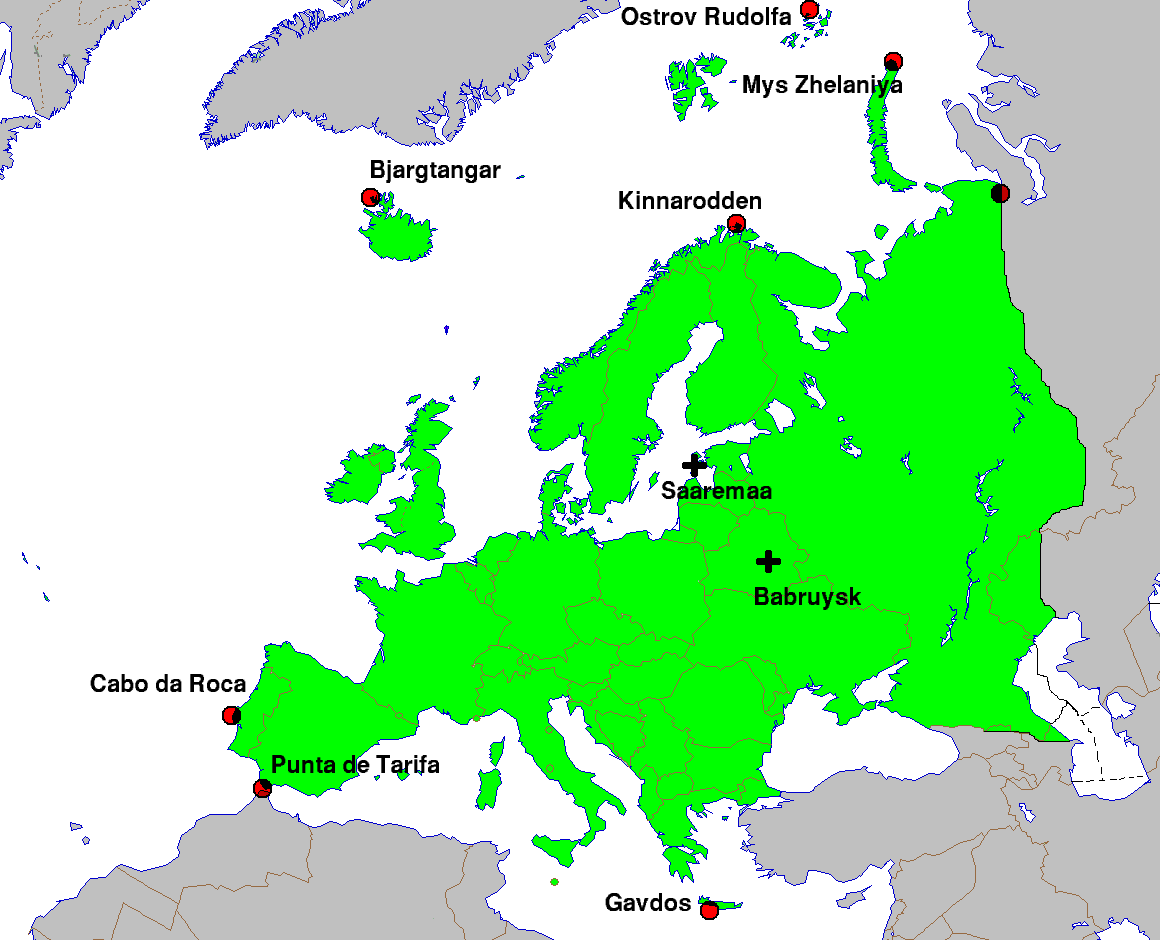
Map of the extreme points of Europe

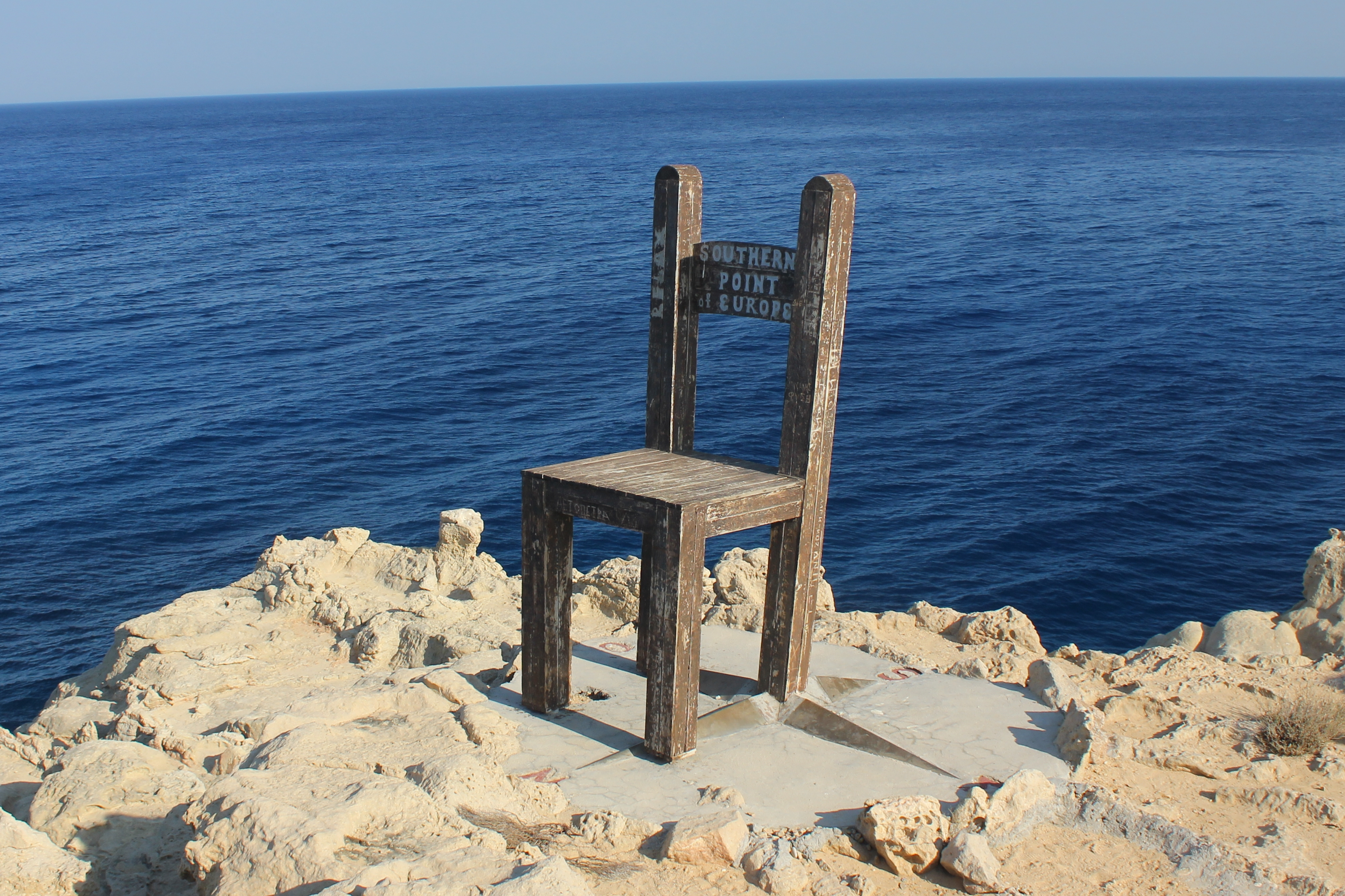
Southernmost point of Europe on the island of Gavdos, Greece

- Northernmost point. Cape Fligely, Rudolf Island, Franz Josef Land, Russia (81° 48′ 24″ N). Franz Josef Land is near the ill-defined border between Europe and Asia; if it is not considered a part of Europe, then the northernmost point is on the island of Rossøya, Svalbard, Norway (81°N).
- Southernmost point. Cape Trypiti, Gavdos Island, Greece (34° 48′ 02″ N) is the least ambiguous southernmost point of Europe. However, there are other contenders, depending on definition. The island of Cyprus, although geographically in Asia, has cultural links with Europe and is also part of the European Union; Cyprus's southernmost point is the British base at Akrotiri (34°35′N). The Portuguese islands of Madeira are borderline between Europe and Africa; their southernmost point is at Bugio Island, at (32°24′14″N). La Restinga on the island of El Hierro (27°45′N) in the Spanish Canary Islands is yet further south and could be considered politically, though not physiographically as part of Europe.
- Westernmost point. Monchique Islet, Azores Islands, Portugal (31° 16′ 30″ W) (If considered part of Europe, though it sits on the North American Plate). If not, then the Capelinhos Volcano, Faial Island, Azores Islands, Portugal (28° 50′ 00″ W), the westernmost point of the Eurasian Plate above sea level.
- Easternmost point. Cape Flissingsky (69° 02′ E), Severny Island, Novaya Zemlya, Russia.

== Extreme points of Mainland Europe ==
- Northernmost point. Cape Nordkinn (Kinnarodden), Norway (71°08′02″N 27°39′00″E)
- Southernmost point. Punta de Tarifa, Spain (36°00'00.2"N). This is the southernmost point of a small island connected to the coast by a causeway in 1808, so no longer an island. If manmade land is not accepted, the continental southernmost point is located slightly more to the North at 36°00'25"N.
- Westernmost point. Cabo da Roca, Portugal (9°29'56.44 W). (Note: Ireland, which is part of the European continental shelf and which was connected to the continent by land during the last glacial period, includes points that are further west than Cabo da Roca (see Extreme points of Ireland).)
- Easternmost point. The easternmost point is dependent upon the various definitions of Europe's eastern border, in particular, the most common definition of Europe's eastern edge to be the watershed divide of the Ural Mountains.
  An alternative easternmost point of mainland Europe has been identified in the Polar Urals on Mount Ngodyayakha (Russian: Нгодяяха). According to Russian sources, the location was determined by researchers and a monument has been erected at the site at approximately 67°43′00″N 66°13′30″E (67.72255°N 66.232033°E), to be a tourist attraction. Elevation: 793m, close to the border between Komi Republic and Yamalo-Nenets Autonomous Okrug.

== Extreme points of the Eurasian Tectonic Plate West of the Urals ==
- Northernmost point. Arctic Ocean, where the North American tectonic plate meets the Eurasian plate, 86°48′17.6″N 61°30′20.2″E.
- Southernmost point. Near Oued Jdida, Morocco, 33°59′06″N 05°23′47.7″W.
- Westernmost point. Atlantic Ocean, where the North American plate meets the Eurasian plate, 800 km (500 mi) southeast of the southern tip of Greenland, 54°19′52.7″N 35°29′16.1″W.
- Easternmost point. Continental divide, Ural Mountains, 67°44′00″N 66°15′06.6″E.

== Elevation ==
- Highest point. The highest point is dependent upon the definition of Europe:
  - The Caucasus Mountains watershed divide is the most common definition for the European/Asian border. This places the highest point at Mount Elbrus, Russia (5,642 metres; 18,506 feet), which is 11 km (6.8 mi) on the European side of the Caucasus watershed divide.
  - If the Caucasus mountains are excluded, the highest point is Mont Blanc, on the border between France and Italy (4,810 metres; 15,781 feet).
- Lowest point (natural, with open sky). Caspian Sea shore, Russia (28 metres; 92 feet below sea level).
- Lowest point (natural, under water). Calypso Deep, Ionian Sea, Greece (5,267 metres; 17,280 feet below sea level).
- Lowest point (natural, underground). Dependent upon the definition of Europe: either Krubera Cave, Abkhazia, Georgia (2196 metres; 7205 feet below surface) (also the deepest cave in the world) or Lamprechtsofen, Austria (1,632 metres; 5,354 feet below surface).
- Lowest point (artificial, with open sky). Hambach surface mine (open-pit mine), Germany (293 metres; 961 feet below sea level).
- Lowest point (artificial, underground). Kola Superdeep Borehole, Russia (12,262 metres; 40,230 feet below surface). Also the deepest artificial point on Earth.

=== Highest attainable by transportation ===
- Cable car (and lift) – Klein Matterhorn, Switzerland (3,883 metres; 12,736 feet)
- Funicular – Mittelallalin, Switzerland (3,456 metres; 11,339 feet)
- Train (dead end) – Jungfraujoch, Switzerland (3,454 metres; 11,330 feet)
- Train (mountain pass) – Bernina Pass, Switzerland (2,253 metres; 7390 feet)
- Restricted access paved road (dead end) – Veleta (Sierra Nevada), Spain (3,300 metres; 10,827 feet)
- Paved road (dead end) – Ötztal Glacier Road, Austria (2,830 metres; 9,285 feet)
- Paved road (mountain pass) – Col de l'Iseran, France (2,770 metres; 9,090 feet)
- See also: List of highest paved roads in Europe and List of highest railways in Europe

=== Lowest attainable by transportation ===
- Lowest public tunnel – Ryfast Tunnel, Norway (292 metres (958 ft) below sea level)

== Extreme points attainable by train ==
=== Extreme station of the European continent, including islands ===
- Northernmost station: Terminal station: unclear which is in service: Pechenga (railway station), Murmansk Oblast, Murmansk Oblast, Russia (274 kilometres (170 mi) from Cape Nordkinn)
- Easternmost station: Crossing of the watershed border of the Ural: Polyarnyj Ural station, literally named after the region of Polar Urals, Komi Republic, Russia (180 km (110 mi) from the easternmost point)
- Southernmost station: Terminal station: Algeciras, Andalusia, Spain (20 kilometres (12 mi) northeast from Punta de Tarifa)
- Westernnmost station: Terminal station: Tralee railway station, County Kerry, Ireland (70 km (43 mi) east from the westernmost point of Ireland)

=== Continental Schengen area ===
- Northernmost station: Terminal station: Narvik, Nordland, Norway
- Easternmost station: Stop on the line Joensuu–Kontiomäki: Uimaharju, North Karelia, Finland
- Southernmost station: Terminal station: Algeciras, Andalusia, Spain
- Westernmost station: Terminal station: Cascais, Lisbon Region, Portugal

== See also ==
- Extreme points of Africa-Eurasia
- Extreme points of Earth
- Extreme points of Eurasia
- Extreme points of the European Union
- Geographical midpoint of Europe
- Geography of Europe
- List of highest points of European countries
- The world's most northern city, capital, island etc.
