= Raduga (nuclear test) =

Coordinates: 73.8700°N 54.3500°E

Information
- Country: Soviet Union
- Test site: Novaya Zemlya Test Range, Russian Federation
- Period: October 1961
- Number of tests: 1
- Test type: Atmospheric Test
- Device type: Fusion
- Max. yield: Total yield 1,450 kilotons of TNT (6,100 TJ)

Test chronology

Raduga (in Russian Радуга, Rainbow) is the codename of a Soviet thermonuclear test, conducted on October 20, 1961, in Mityushikha Bay, Severny Island of Novaya Zemlya, in the 1961 Soviet nuclear tests.

The test was conducted by the Northern Fleet. An R-13 missile with a thermonuclear warhead was fired from the submarine K-102. When the submarine reached the specified point in the Barents Sea, she could not establish her position due to cloudiness and snowfall. A R-13 missile without a nuclear warhead was fired first, which missed the aiming point by a wide margin. It was decided to continue the test in spite of bad weather. The second missile performed better and its miss distance was less than the previous one, and detonated at 1,000 m (3,300 ft) height, yielding 1.45 megatons.

== See also ==
- Tsar Bomba
