= Mityushikha Bay =

Bay on Severny Island in Novaya Zemlya, Russia

- Губа Митюшиха (Russian)
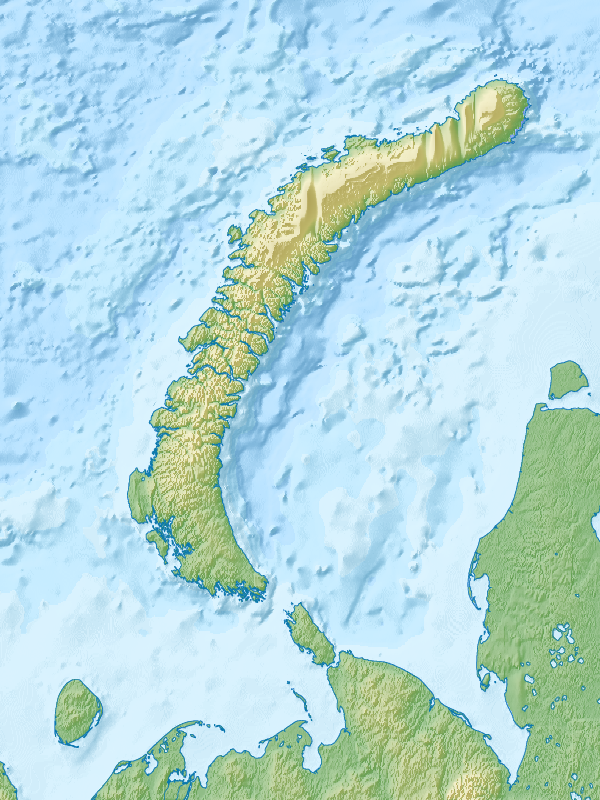
- Location
- Location: Far North
- Coordinates: 73°38′26″N 54°34′48″E
- Ocean/sea sources: Barents Sea
- Basin countries: Russia
- Max. length: 50 km (31 mi)
- Max. width: 6 km (3.7 mi)
- Islands: Gagachy Island

Mityushikha Bay (Russian: Губа Митюшиха) is a bay on Severny Island in Novaya Zemlya, Russia. Nuclear tests were conducted in 1961 in the area of the bay, including the 50-57 megaton Tsar Bomba.

== Geography ==
It is a long fjord open to the west near the SW end of the island, just north of the western end of the Matochkin Strait. The fjord narrows about 20 km (12 mi) to the east from its mouth. Gagachy Island is located in the middle of the bay, before the stretch that becomes narrow.

== See also ==
- List of fjords of Russia
- Raduga (nuclear test)
