= Gusinaya Zemlya =

Russian peninsula in the Barents Sea

Coordinates: 71°47′N 51°59′E

The Gusinaya Zemlya (Russian: Гусиная Земля means Goose Land) is a peninsula in the western portion of Yuzhny Island located in Arkhangelsk Oblast, Russia. It is the biggest peninsula on the archipelago Novaya Zemlya. It protrudes into the Barents Sea, with Kostin Shar to the south, and Mollera Bay to the north.

== Sources ==
- Map of north of peninsula
- Map of south of peninsula
