= Mezhdusharsky Island =

Island in Barents Sea, Russia, part of Novaya Zemlya

Coordinates: 71°12′N 52°50′E

Mezhdusharsky Island and Novaya Zemlya

Mezhdusharsky Island (Russian: о́стров Междуша́рский) is the third largest island of the Novaya Zemlya archipelago, lying north of Russia's mainland. It lies in the Barents Sea to the west of the much larger Yuzhny Island. The area of the Mezhdusharsky Island is 742 square kilometres (286 sq mi).

== See also ==
- List of islands of Russia
