= Cape Zhelaniya =

Headland on Novaya Zemlya, Russia

Cape Zhelaniya Мыс Желания
- Cape
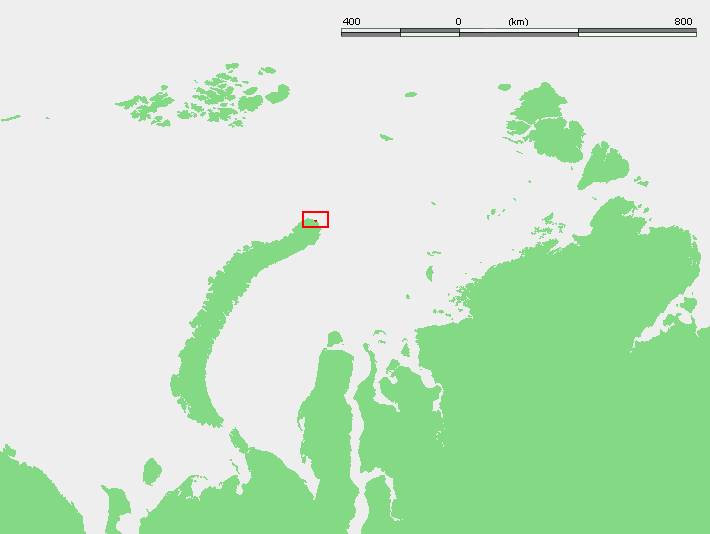
- Location of Cape Zhelaniya

- Coordinates: 76°57′16.08″N 68°34′54.41″E
- Location: Arkhangelsk Oblast, Russia
- Offshore water bodies: Barents Sea / Kara Sea

Area
  - Total: Russian Far North

Cape Zhelaniya (Russian: Мыс Желания, Mys Zhelaniya; желание being Russian for 'wish/desire') is a headland in the Russian Federation. It is an important geographical landmark. The area in the vicinity of the cape is a desolate place, exposed to bitter Arctic winters. The cape along with the surrounding part of Novaya Zemlya is protected as part of Russian Arctic National Park.

== Geography ==
Cape Zhelaniya is located at the northern end of Severny Island, the northern island of Novaya Zemlya. This headland is a geographic point of reference to mark the separation between the northern ends of the Barents Sea and the Kara Sea.

It belongs administratively to the Arkhangelsk Oblast of the Russian Federation.

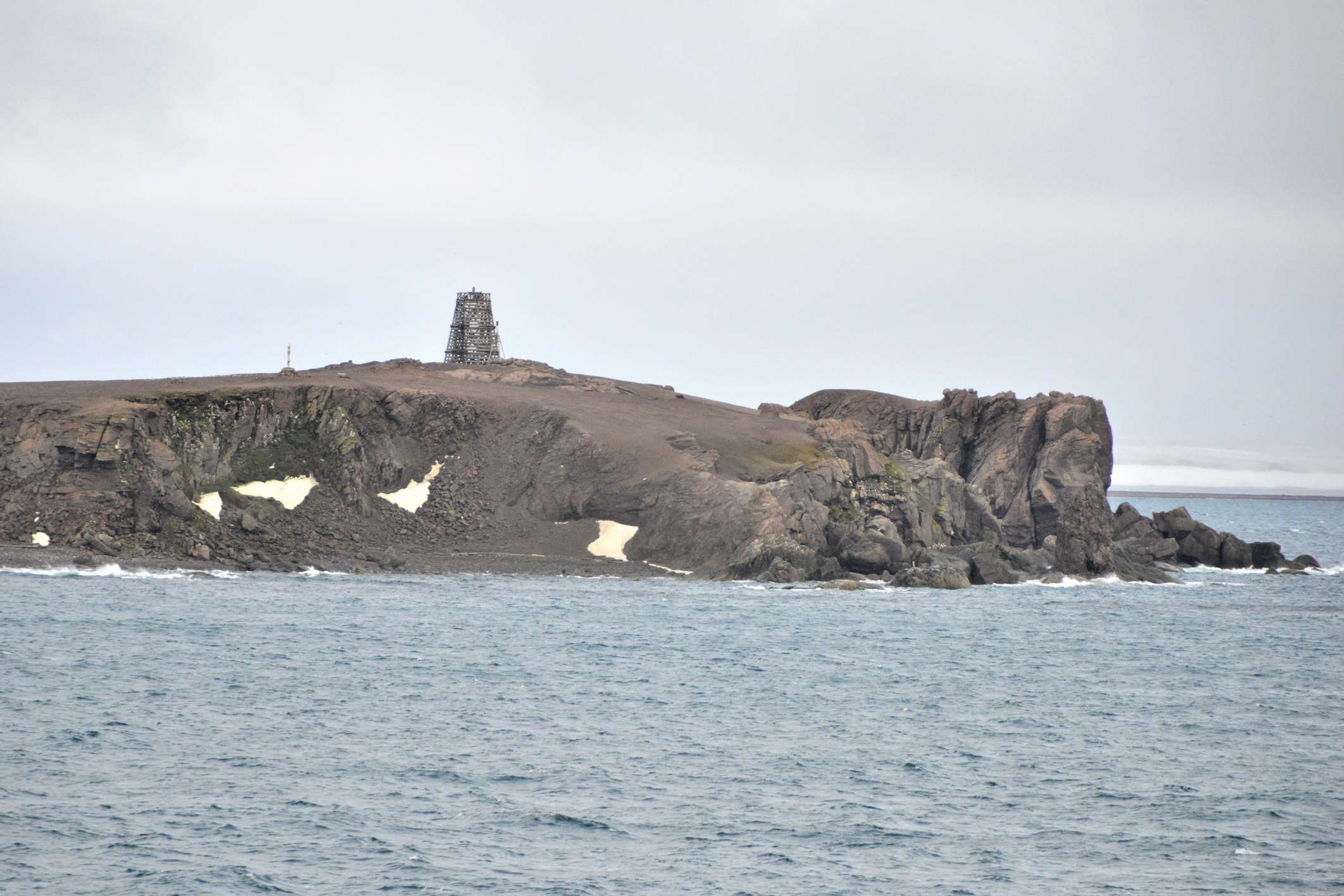
View of Cape Zhelaniya

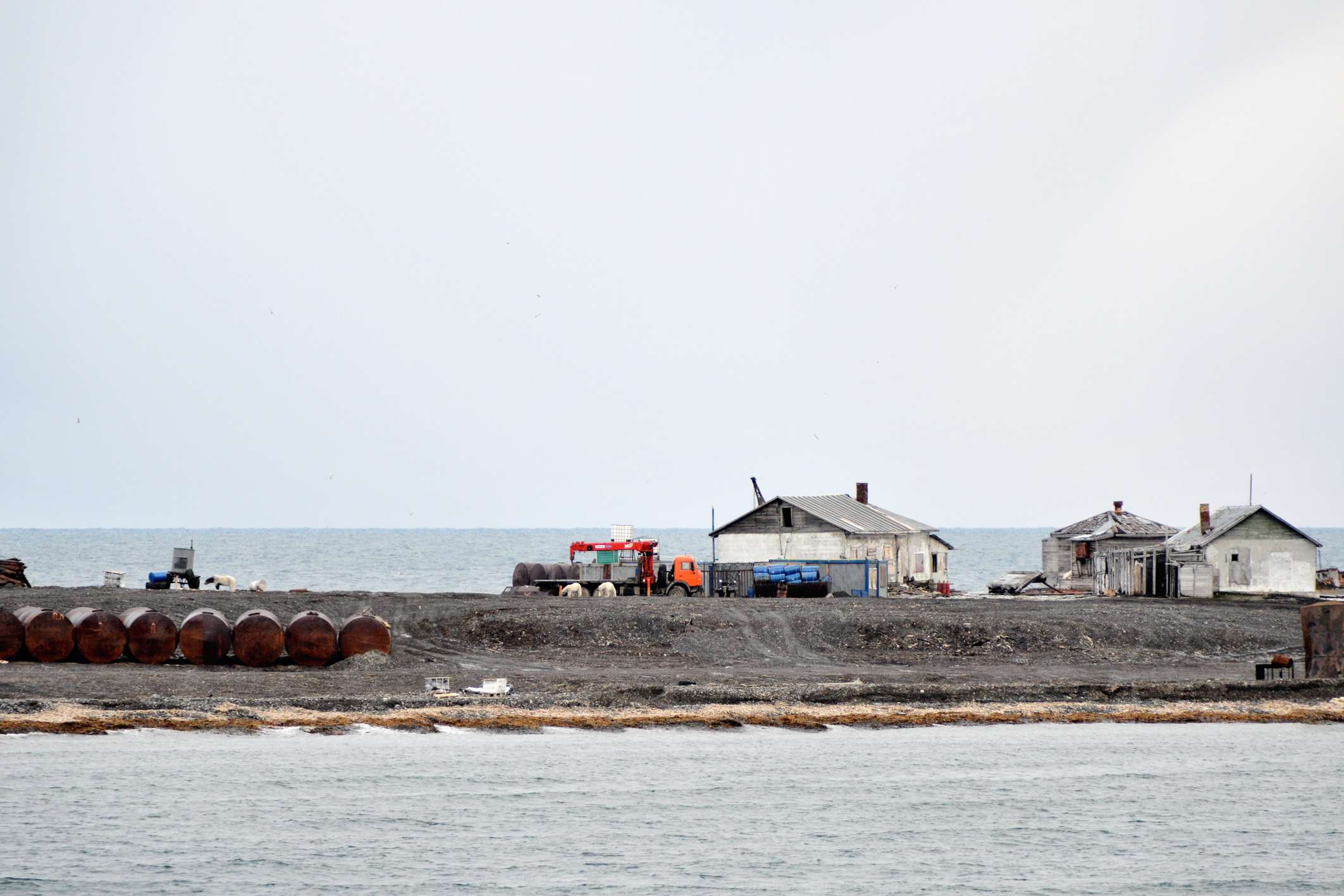
Cape Zhelaniya weather station

== History ==
The cape was named by Dutch explorer William Barents in 1595 as Den Hoeck der Begeerte, which means "Cape Desire".

There was a Soviet Arctic station in Cape Zhelaniya in World War II which was shelled by the Kriegsmarine during Operation Wunderland.

It became a secret experimental station during the Cold War while a multitude of nuclear tests, including 88 atmospheric ones, were conducted in Novaya Zemlya. It functioned as a weather station until 1994, and since 2005 there has been an automatic meteorological station located here.

== Climate ==
Climate data for Cape Zhelaniya (1981-2010 normals) (Climate ID:20353)
Month	Jan	Feb	Mar	Apr	May	Jun	Jul	Aug	Sep	Oct	Nov	Dec	Year
Record high °C (°F)	1.1 (34.0)	1.5 (34.7)	3.6 (38.5)	8.3 (46.9)	11.1 (52.0)	14.4 (57.9)	19.0 (66.2)	16.0 (60.8)	18.7 (65.7)	14.0 (57.2)	5.0 (41.0)	1.2 (34.2)	19.0 (66.2)
Mean daily maximum °C (°F)	−17.0 (1.4)	−17.4 (0.7)	−15.9 (3.4)	−13.6 (7.5)	−5.5 (22.1)	0.7 (33.3)	3.8 (38.8)	3.8 (38.8)	1.6 (34.9)	−4.5 (23.9)	−11.3 (11.7)	−16.7 (1.9)	−7.7 (18.2)
Daily mean °C (°F)	−20.7 (−5.3)	−20.9 (−5.6)	−19.4 (−2.9)	−16.9 (1.6)	−7.8 (18.0)	−0.9 (30.4)	2.0 (35.6)	2.2 (36.0)	0.1 (32.2)	−6.5 (20.3)	−13.9 (7.0)	−19.6 (−3.3)	−10.2 (13.7)
Mean daily minimum °C (°F)	−24 (−11)	−24.2 (−11.6)	−22.7 (−8.9)	−20.1 (−4.2)	−10.0 (14.0)	−2.5 (27.5)	0.3 (32.5)	0.6 (33.1)	−1.3 (29.7)	−8.5 (16.7)	−16.5 (2.3)	−22.5 (−8.5)	−12.6 (9.3)
Record low °C (°F)	−40 (−40)	−40 (−40)	−39 (−38)	−39 (−38)	−31.1 (−24.0)	−18.9 (−2.0)	−5.4 (22.3)	−7.2 (19.0)	−10.6 (12.9)	−29.5 (−21.1)	−35 (−31)	−39 (−38)	−40 (−40)
Average precipitation mm (inches)	9.7 (0.38)	11.3 (0.44)	16.0 (0.63)	7.9 (0.31)	17.5 (0.69)	16.0 (0.63)	23.3 (0.92)	27.9 (1.10)	25.6 (1.01)	21.3 (0.84)	14.2 (0.56)	16.0 (0.63)	206.7 (8.14)
Average precipitation days (≥ 1 mm)	12.6	11.8	13.8	11.3	18.9	15.8	15.6	19.7	19.7	21.1	15.6	11.7	187.6
Source: Météo Climat

== Literature ==
- F. Romanenko, O. Shilovtseva, Russian-Soviet polar stations and their role in the Arctic Seas exploration.
- History of the Northern Sea Route
- Geology
