= Cape Flissingsky =

Cape on Novaya Zemlya, Russia

Coordinates: 76°42′07″N 69°05′28″E

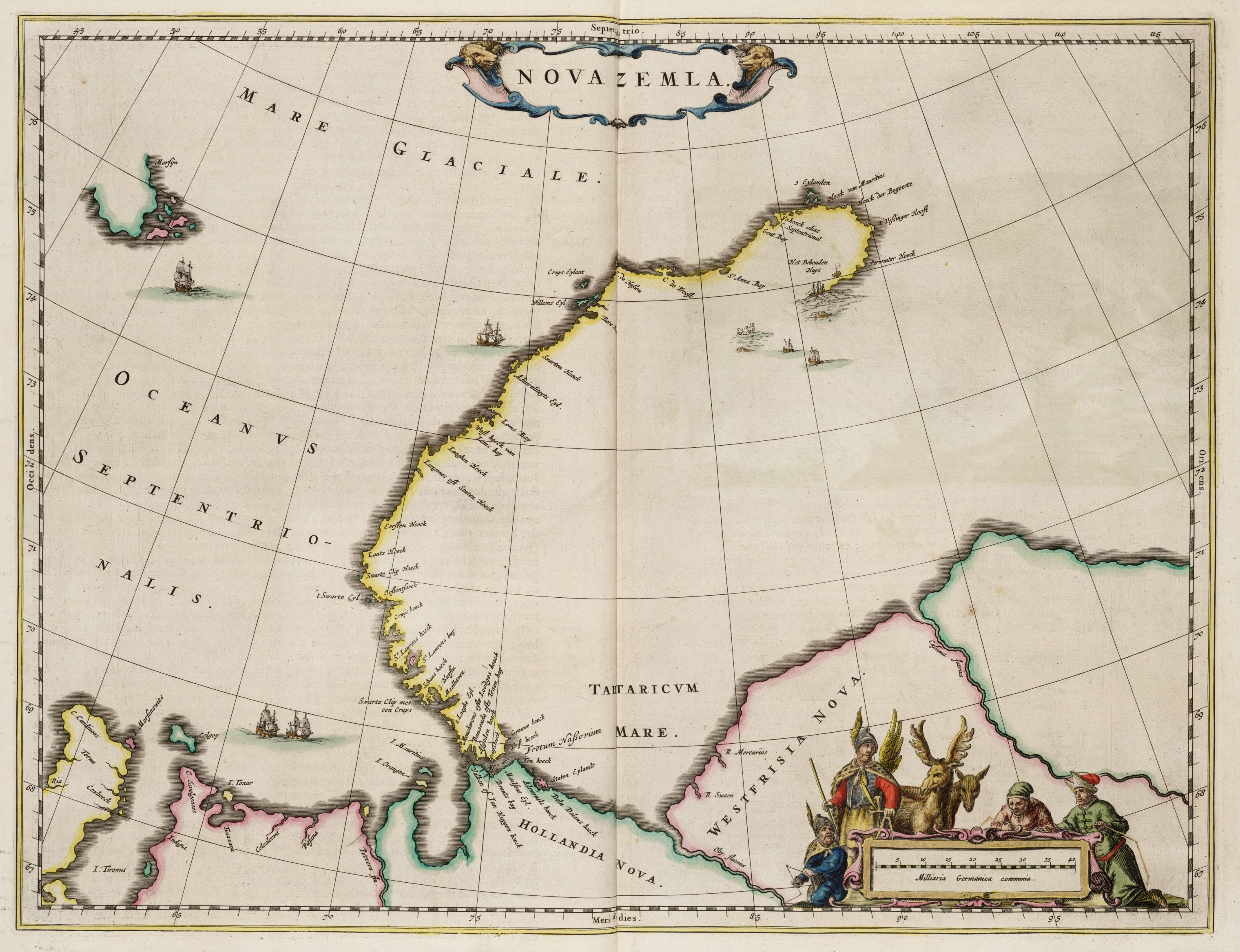
Dutch map of Novaya Zemlya with Cape Flissingsky indicated by t' Vlißinger Hooft on the Northeastern edge (Atlas van Loon, 1664)

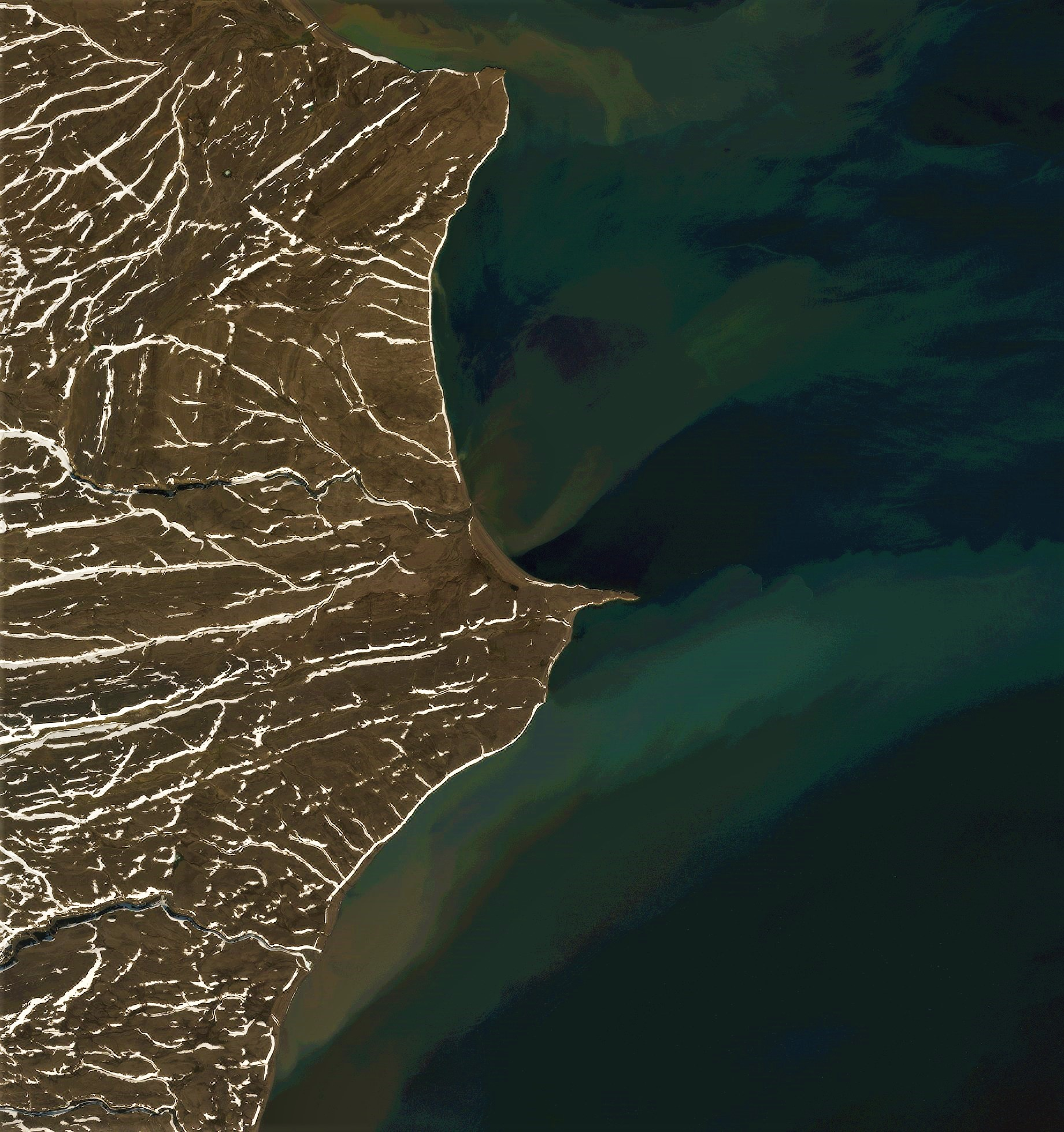
Satellite image of Cape Flissingsky

Cape Flissingsky (Russian: Мыс Флиссингский; Mys Flissingskiy) is a cape on Northern Island, Novaya Zemlya, Russia. It is considered the easternmost point of Europe, including islands.

The cape was discovered by Willem Barents in 1596, during his pursuit of the northern sea route to Asia. It is named after the Dutch city of Vlissingen, the original name being 't Vlissinger Hooft.

The cape is a few kilometers from the shelter that Barents and his crew built to overwinter from 1596 to 1597, and where he ultimately died the following year. A memorial cross in his honor is erected in the area.

== See also ==
- Extreme points of Europe
