= Gora Severny Nunatak =

Nunatak in Novaya Zemlya, Russia

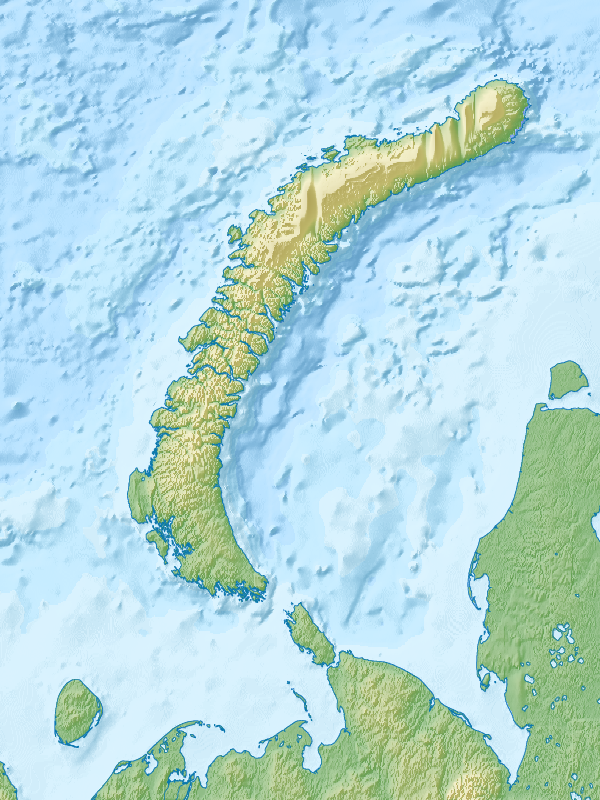
- Location within Novaya Zemlya

Highest point
- Elevation: 727 m (2,385 ft)
- Coordinates: 76°36′N 66°20′E

Naming
- Native name: Гора Северный Нунатак (Russian)

Geography
- Location: Novaya Zemlya, Russia

Climbing
- First ascent: Unknown

Gora Severny or Gora Severnyy Nunatak (Russian: Гора Северный Нунатак) is a nunatak in Novaya Zemlya, northern Russia. It is one of the very few nunataks of the Russian Federation. Administratively it falls under the Arkhangelsk Oblast.

== Geography ==
Gora Severny Nunatak is located in the northern section of Severny Island ice cap, the long ice cap covering most of inner Severny Island, Novaya Zemlya. It is not far from the western coast of the island.

The nunatak is 4.9 km in length and its maximum width is 2.4 km. Its highest elevation is 727 metres (2,385 ft) high.

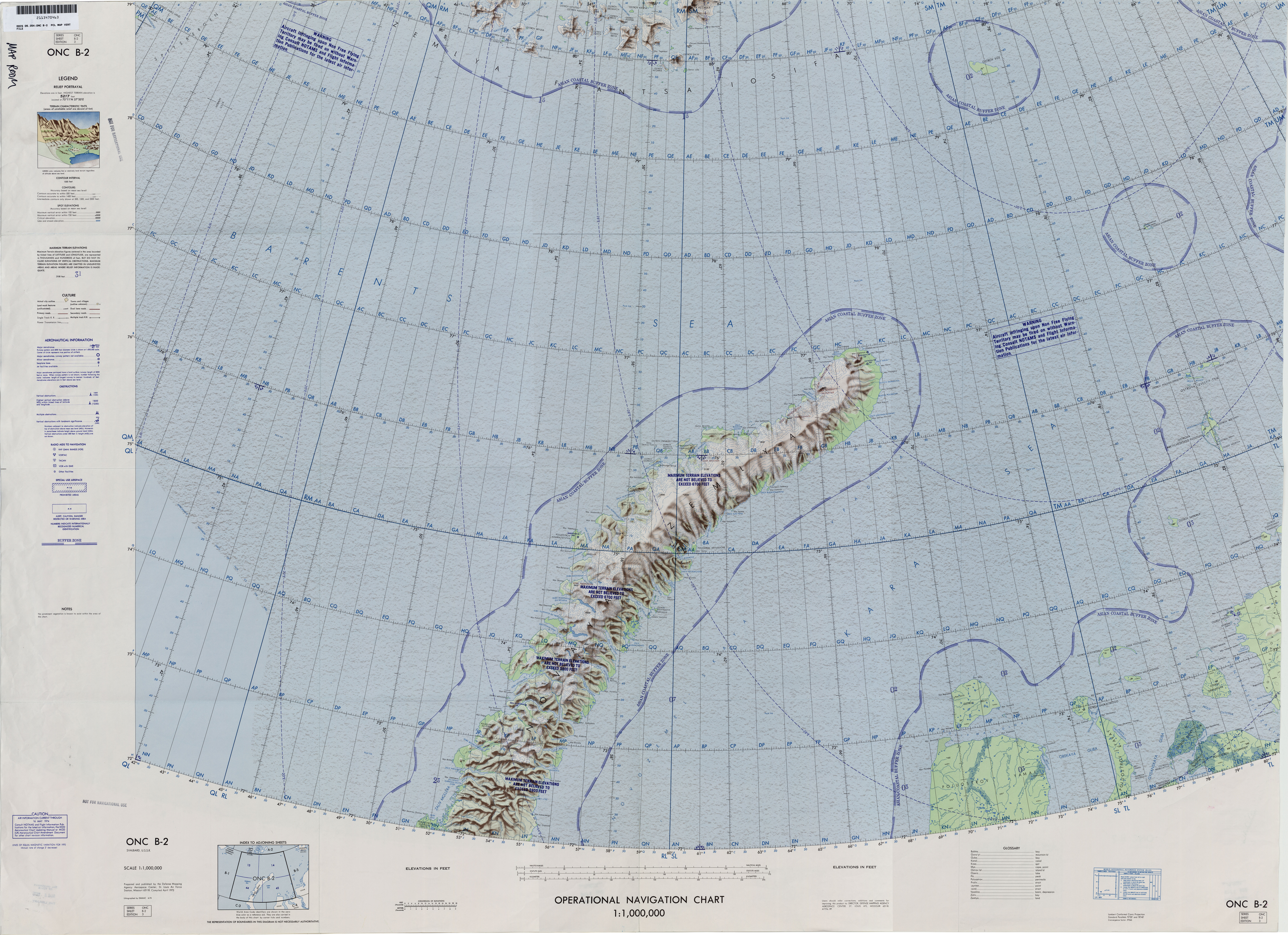
Map of northern Novaya Zemlya and southern Franz Josef Land.

== See also ==
- List of nunataks
