= Russian Arctic National Park =

National park of Russia

- Русская Арктика
- IUCN category II (national park)
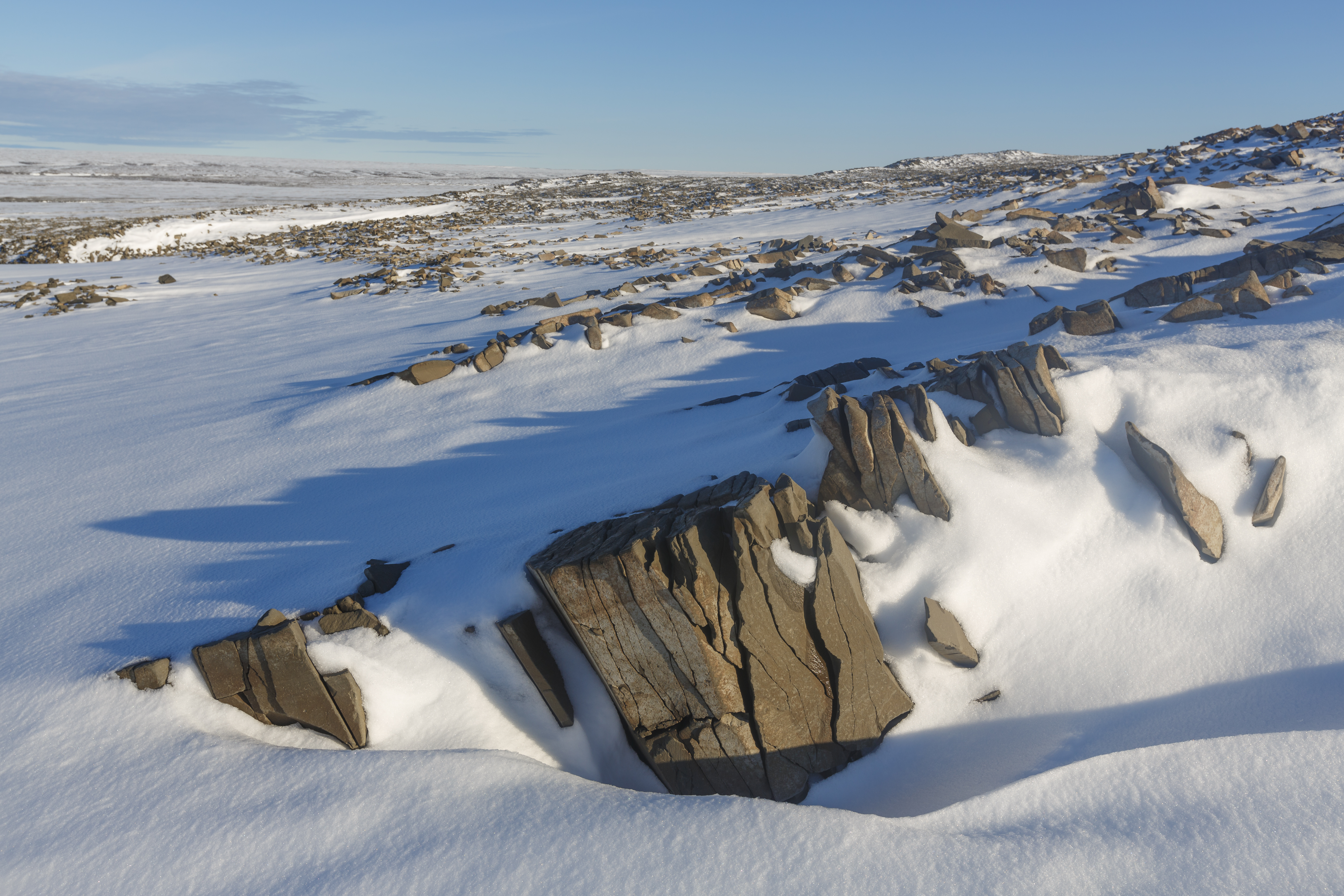
- Landscape in Novaya Zemlya, Russian Arctic National Park

- Location within Russia
- Location: Novaya Zemlya and Franz Josef Land, Arkhangelsk Oblast, Russia
- Nearest city: Arkhangelsk
- Coordinates: 75°42′N 60°54′E
- Area: 14,260 km^{2} (5,510 sq mi)
- Established: 15 June 2009

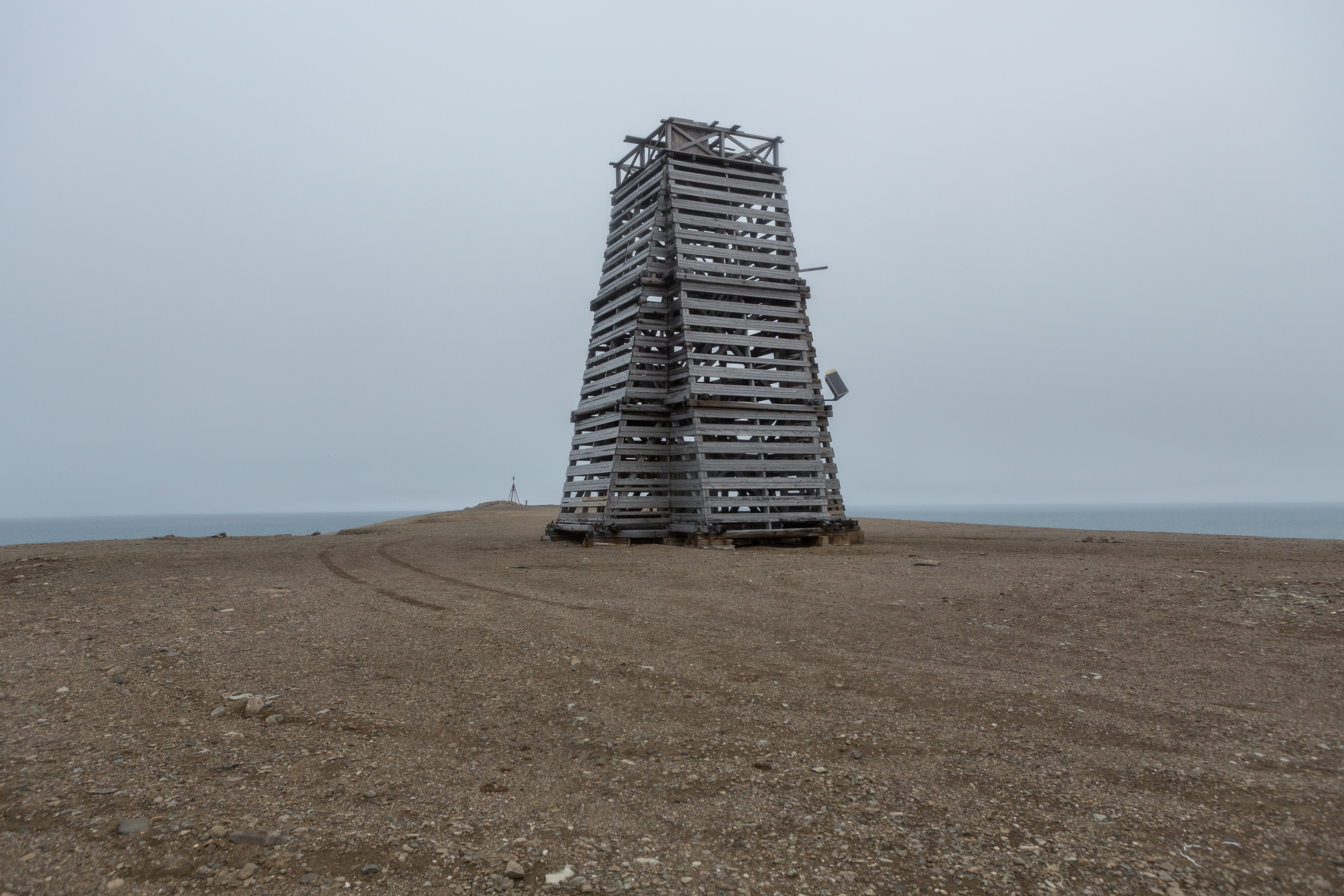
Cape Zhelaniya

Russian Arctic National Park (Russian: Национальный парк "Русская Арктика") is a national park of Russia, which was established in June 2009. It was expanded in 2016, and it covers a large and remote area of the Arctic Ocean, the northern part of Novaya Zemlya (Severny Island), and Franz Josef Land.

== Geography ==
After expansion in 2016, approximately 74,000 km^{2}, 16,000 km^{2} in land area and 58,000 km^{2} in sea area were added to the National Park. In 2009 the total area of the national park was 14,260 km^{2}, including 6,320 km^{2} on the land and 7,940 km^{2} of the Arctic Ocean.

The area is the habitat of polar bears and bowhead whales. The area also includes one of the largest bird colonies in the Northern Hemisphere, as well as walrus and seal rookeries. In addition to preserving natural habitats, the area of the national park is important for preserving the cultural heritage, which is related to the history of discovery and colonisation of the vast Arctic territories starting from the sixteenth century.

The Great Arctic State Nature Reserve is located on counter-side of Kara Sea.

== History ==
The Russian government first established the Franz Joseph Land Conservation Area on 23 April 1994. Plans for a national park covering northern Novaya Zemlya and Franz Josef Land were launched in the 2000s. When Russian Arctic National Park was established on 15 June 2009, Franz Josef Land and Victoria Island were excluded. Announcing the event, Prime Minister Vladimir Putin expressed his hopes that the National Park could help develop tourism in the area. Putin visited the archipelago in 2010, describing it as a "giant rubbish tip".

By 2011 the national park had been expanded to also include Franz Josef Land in a move to better accommodate tourism in the archipelago. Russia commenced a 1.5 billion ruble, three-year clean-up project starting in 2012 to remove more than 100,000 tonnes of waste which had accumulated during the Soviet era. These include a quarter million barrels of oil products, a million old barrels and dilapidated vehicles, radar installations and aircraft, among others.

== Wildlife ==
The park is regarded as one of the most well-established protected areas for marine mammals in the nation. Instances of Bowhead and Gray whales in the area make the park's ecological value to be extraordinary.
