= Pechenga (railway station), Murmansk Oblast =

Pechenga Station Печенга
- Station
- Interactive map of Pechenga Station
- Location of Pechenga Station Pechenga Station (Murmansk Oblast)
- Coordinates: 69°30′37″N 31°10′23″E
- Country: Russia
- Federal subject: Murmansk Oblast
- Administrative district: Pechengsky District

Population (2010 Census)
  - Total: 1,565
  - Estimate (2021): 983 (−37.2%)
- Time zone: UTC+3 (MSK)
- Postal code: 184410
- Dialing code: +7 81554
- OKTMO ID: 47615162126

Pechenga Station (Russian: Печенга, Finnish: Petsamo) is the rural locality (a Station) in Pechengsky District of Murmansk Oblast, Russia. The village is located beyond the Arctic Circle.

The railway station is located at a branch of the Oktyabrskaya Railway. It has been the northernmost railway station in Russia connected to the main network.
