= Novaya Zemlya =

Archipelago in northern Russia

Новая Земля (Russian)
- Map of Novaya Zemlya

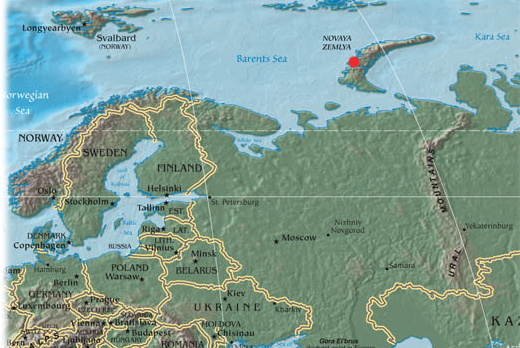
- Location of Novaya Zemlya, including the site of the Tsar Bomba detonation

Geography
- Location: Arctic Ocean
- Coordinates: 74°45′N 57°57′E
- Major islands: 2
- Area: 83,000 km^{2} (32,000 sq mi)
- Highest elevation: 1,547 m (5075 ft)
- Highest point: Gora Kruzenshterna

Administration
- Russia
- Federal subject: Arkhangelsk Oblast
- Largest settlement: Belushya Guba (pop. 1,972)

Demographics
- Population: 3,576 (2021)
- Pop. density: 0.04/km^{2} (0.1/sq mi)

Additional information
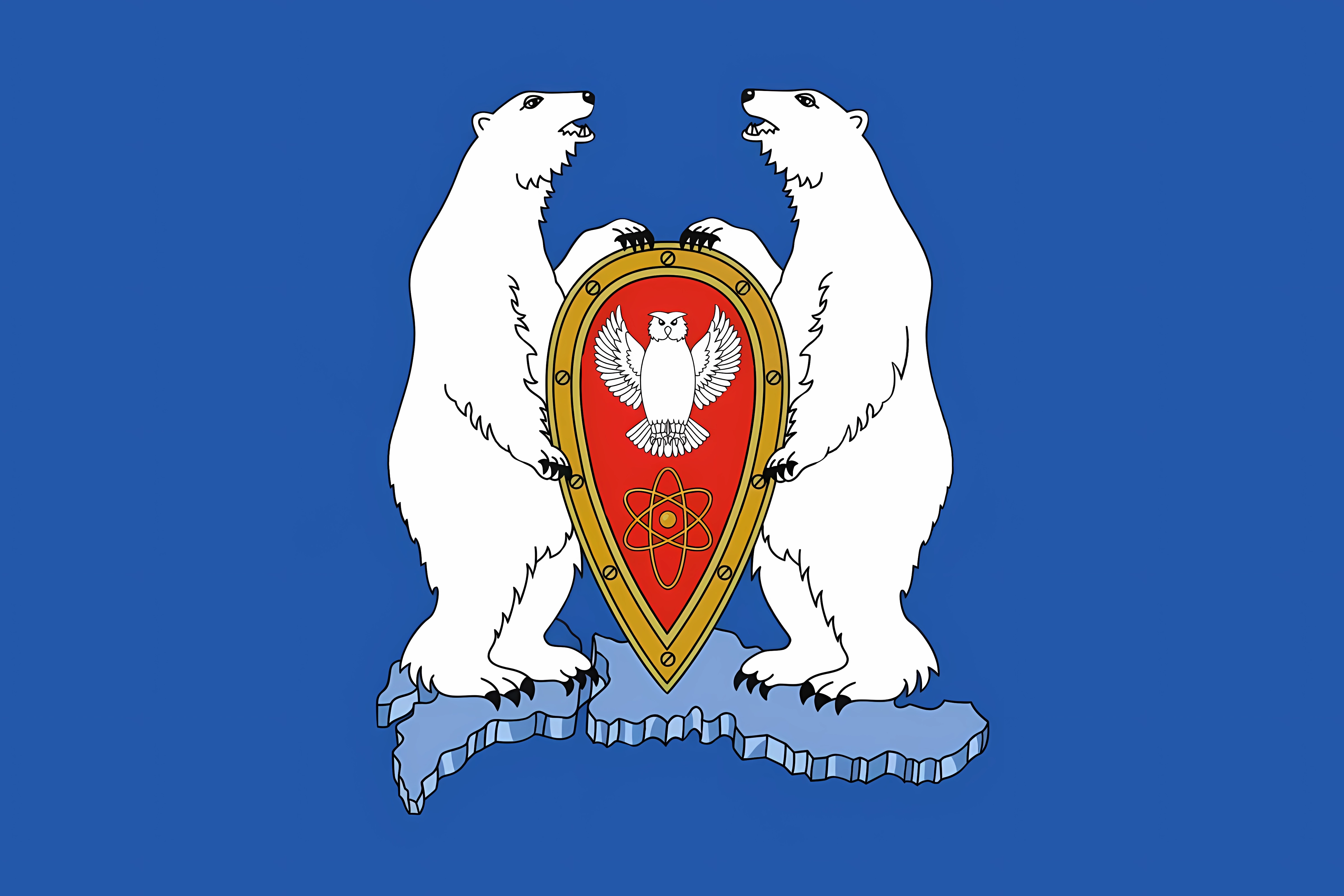
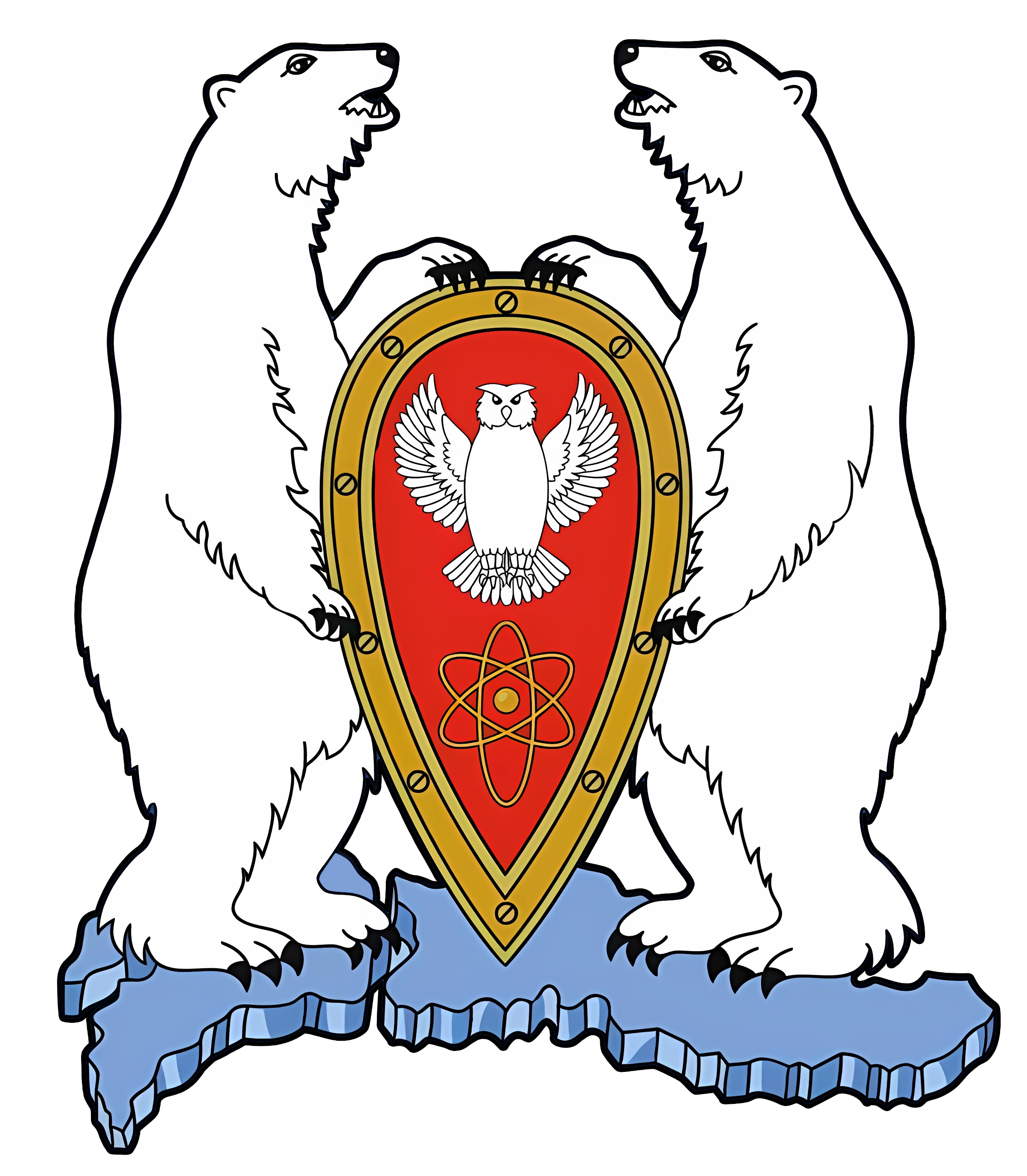
- Flag Seal

Novaya Zemlya, (Note: /ˌnoʊvəjə ˈzɛmliə/, also UK: /ˌnɒv-, -aɪ.ə -/, US: /- zɛmˈl(j)ɑː/; Russian: Новая Земля, IPA: [ˈnovəjə zʲɪmˈlʲa]; lit. 'New Land') also spelled Novaja Zemlja, is an archipelago in northern Russia. It is situated in the Arctic Ocean, in the extreme northeast of Europe, with Cape Flissingsky, on the northern island, considered the easternmost point of Europe. To Novaya Zemlya's west lies the Barents Sea and to the east is the Kara Sea. The name literally translates to 'new land' or 'new Earth' in the Russian language.

Novaya Zemlya consists of two main islands, the northern Severny Island and the southern Yuzhny Island, which are separated by the Matochkin Strait. Administratively, it is incorporated as Novaya Zemlya District, one of the twenty-one in Arkhangelsk Oblast, Russia. Municipally, it is incorporated as Novaya Zemlya Urban Okrug.

Novaya Zemlya was a sensitive military area during the Cold War, and parts of it are still used for airfields today. The Soviet Air Force maintained a presence at Rogachevo on the southern part of the southern island, on the westernmost peninsula (71.61787°N 52.47884°E). It was used primarily for interceptor aircraft operations, but also provided logistical support for the nearby nuclear test area. Novaya Zemlya was one of the two major nuclear test sites managed by the USSR along with the Semipalatinsk Test Site; it was used for air drops and underground testing of the largest of Soviet nuclear bombs, in particular the 30 October 1961 air burst explosion of Tsar Bomba, the largest, most powerful nuclear weapon ever detonated.

== History ==
The Russian people knew of Novaya Zemlya from the 11th century, when hunters from Novgorod visited the area. For Western Europeans, the search for the Northern Sea Route in the 16th century led to its exploration. The first visit from a Western European was by Hugh Willoughby in 1553. Dutch explorer Willem Barentsz reached the west coast of Novaya Zemlya in 1594, and in a subsequent expedition of 1596, he rounded the northern cape and wintered on the northeastern coast. (Barentsz died during the expedition and may have been buried on Severny Island.) During a later voyage by Fyodor Litke in 1821–1824, the western coast was mapped. Henry Hudson was another explorer who passed through Novaya Zemlya while searching for the Northeast Passage.

The islands were systematically surveyed by Pyotr Pakhtusov and Avgust Tsivolko during the early 1830s. The first permanent settlement was established in 1870 at Malye Karmakuly, which served as the capital of Novaya Zemlya until 1924. Later, the administrative center was transferred to Belushya Guba, in 1935 it was transferred to Lagernoe, but then returned to Belushya Guba.

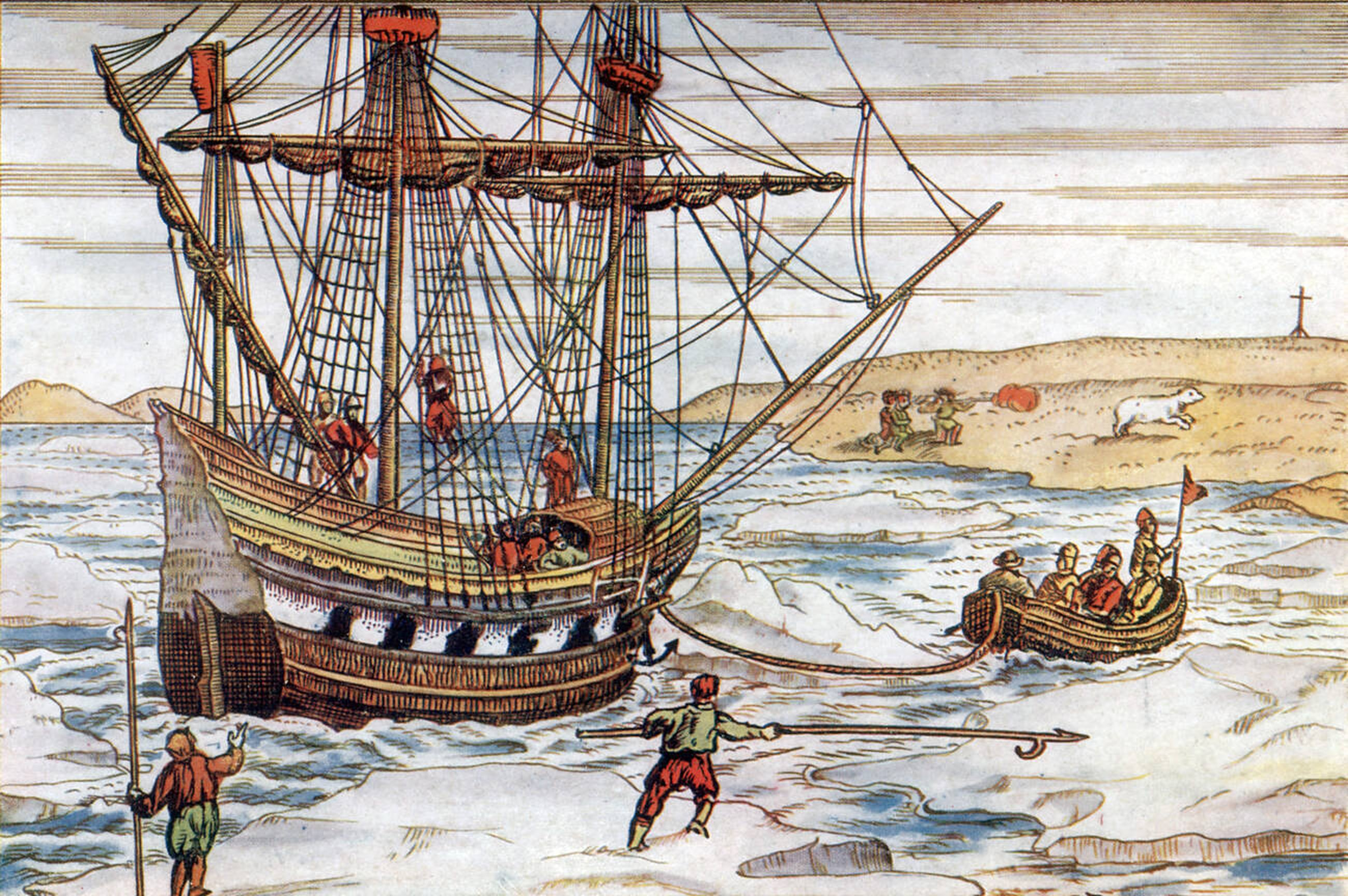
Willem Barentsz' ship among the Arctic ice.

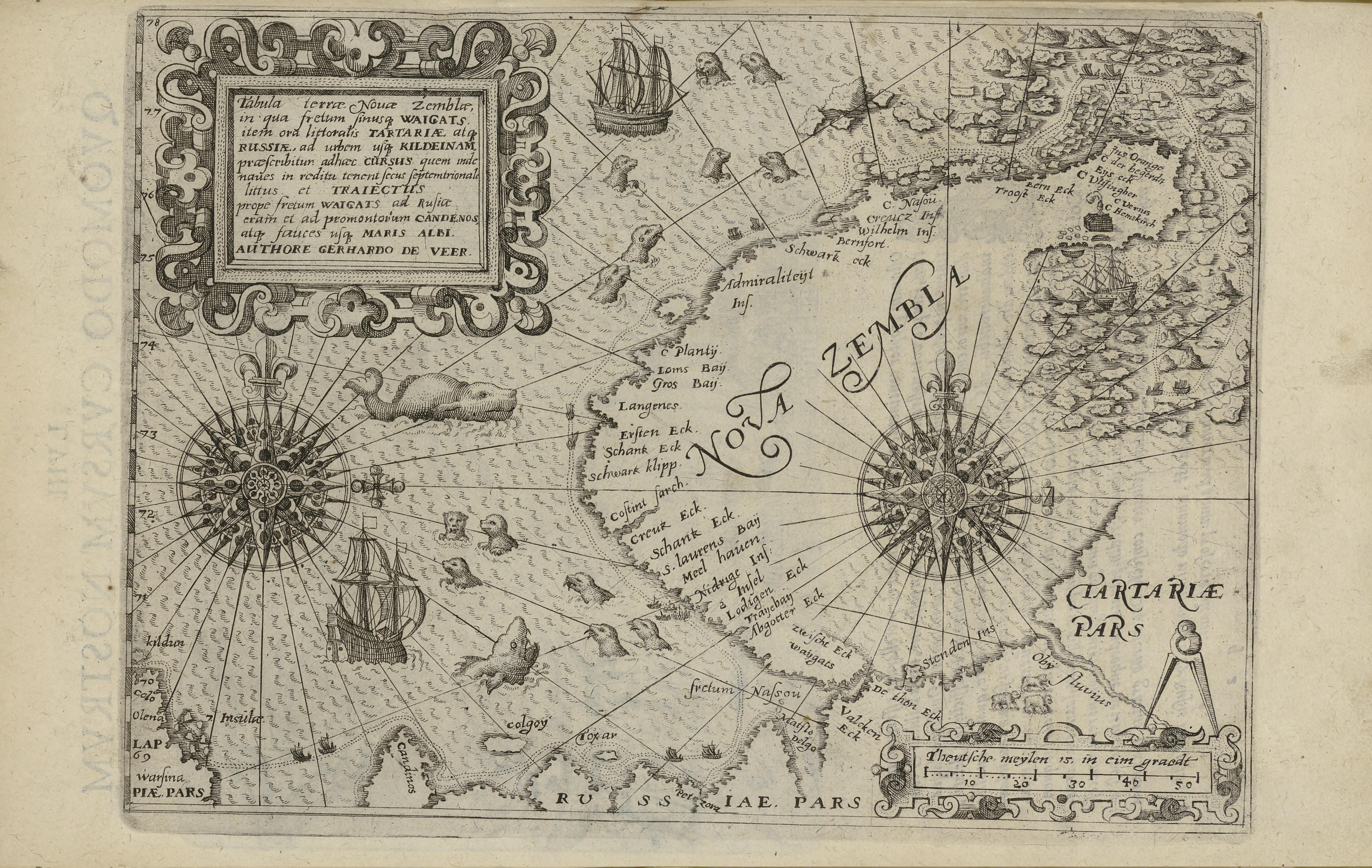
1599–1601 map of Novaya Zemlya.

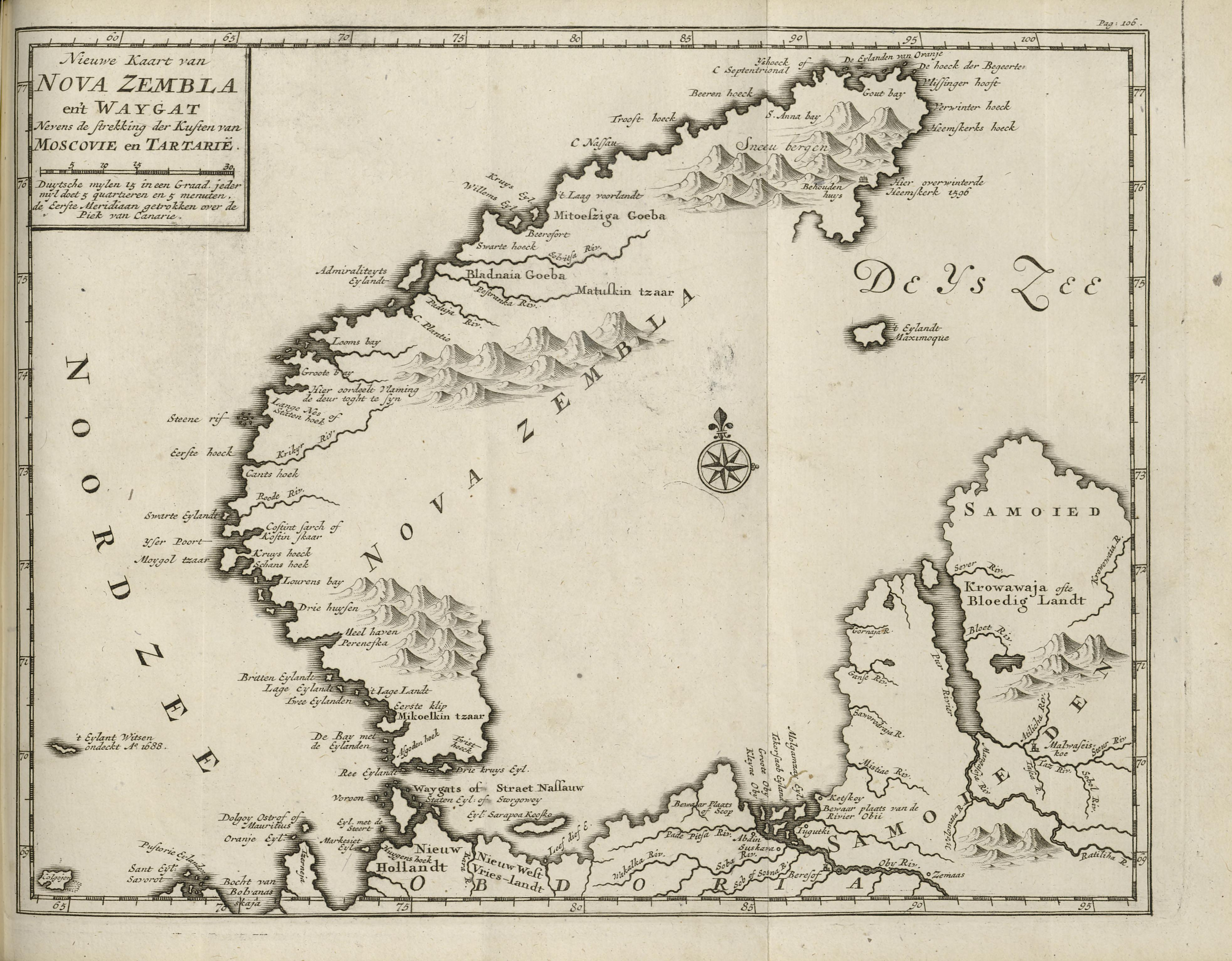
Map of Novaya Zemlya from 1720.

=== World War II ===
In the months following Hitler's June 1941 invasion of the Soviet Union, the United States and Great Britain organized convoys of merchant ships under naval escort to deliver Lend-Lease supplies to northern Soviet seaports. The Allied convoys up to PQ 12 arrived unscathed but German aircraft, ships and U-boats were sent to northern Norway and Finland to oppose the convoys.

==== Convoy PQ 17 ====
Convoy PQ 17 consisted of 36 merchant ships containing 297 aircraft, 596 tanks, 4,286 other vehicles and more than 150,000 long tons (152,407 t) of other cargo, six destroyer escorts, fifteen additional armed ships (among which were two Free-French corvettes) and three small rescue craft. The convoy departed Iceland on June 27, 1942, one ship running aground and dropping out of the convoy. The convoy was able to sail north of Bear Island but encountered ice floes on June 30; a ship was damaged too badly to carry on and broke radio silence. On the following morning, the convoy was detected by German U-boats and German reconnaissance aircraft and torpedo bomber attacks began on July 2.

On the night of July 2/3, the German battleship Tirpitz and the heavy cruiser Admiral Hipper, sortied from Trondheim with four destroyers and two smaller vessels. The pocket battleships Admiral Scheer and Lützow and six destroyers sailed from Narvik, but Lützow and three destroyers ran aground. The British Admiralty responded on July 4 by diverting the escort vessels to the west to rendezvous with the Home Fleet and ordered the merchant vessels to scatter. Seeking safety in the Matochkin Strait, several ships headed toward Novaya Zemlya.

==== Operation Wunderland ====
In August 1942, the German Navy commenced Operation Wunderland, to enter the Kara Sea and sink as many Soviet ships as possible. Admiral Scheer and other warships rounded Cape Desire, entered the Kara Sea and attacked a shore station on Dikson Island, badly damaging the Soviet ships Dezhnev and Revolutionist. Later that year, Karlo Štajner made the acquaintance of a new prisoner, a Captain Menshikov, who told him that:

In August 1942, another…transport arrived in Novaya Zemlya. The escort ships turned around and went back. Just a few hours later, the watchman in the tower announced that a ship was in sight. Everyone assumed it was one of the Allied warships and didn't give the matter any importance. Shortly after, the watchman announced that the ship was nearing the bay. I went outside…to see for myself. As soon as I had climbed the tower, I realized to my horror that this was a German warship. I gave the alarm, but it was too late… the German cruiser was coming closer. One of the Allied freighters — the first ship we managed to get moving — steered its way out of the bay. That's all the Germans were waiting for. At the moment when the ship reached the narrowest part of the bay, the German guns sent off their first salvo — a direct hit… our coastal batteries opened fire… but the guns didn't reach far enough… [they] came closer and destroyed all the ships in the bay, as well as a large part of the harbor [and] left a hundred dead and wounded.

Whether the attack on Menshikov's battery occurred on Dikson Island or on Novaya Zemlya, Stajner's account illuminated the fate of a Soviet officer imprisoned by his countrymen for the "crime" of suffering defeat at the hands of the enemy. Not surprisingly, Menshikov's arrest was never announced in the Soviet press.

==== 1943 operations ====
In August 1943, a German U-boat sank the Soviet research ship Akademic Shokalskiy near Mys Sporyy Navolok but the Soviet Navy, now on the offensive, destroyed the German submarine U-639 near Mys Zhelaniya.

In 1943, Novaya Zemlya briefly served as a secret seaplane base for Nazi Germany's Kriegsmarine, to provide German surveillance of Allied shipping en route to Siberia. The seaplane base was established by U-255 and U-711, which were operating along the northern coast of Soviet Russia as part of 13th U-boat Flotilla. Seaplane sorties were flown in August and September 1943.

=== Nuclear testing ===
Novaya Zemlya
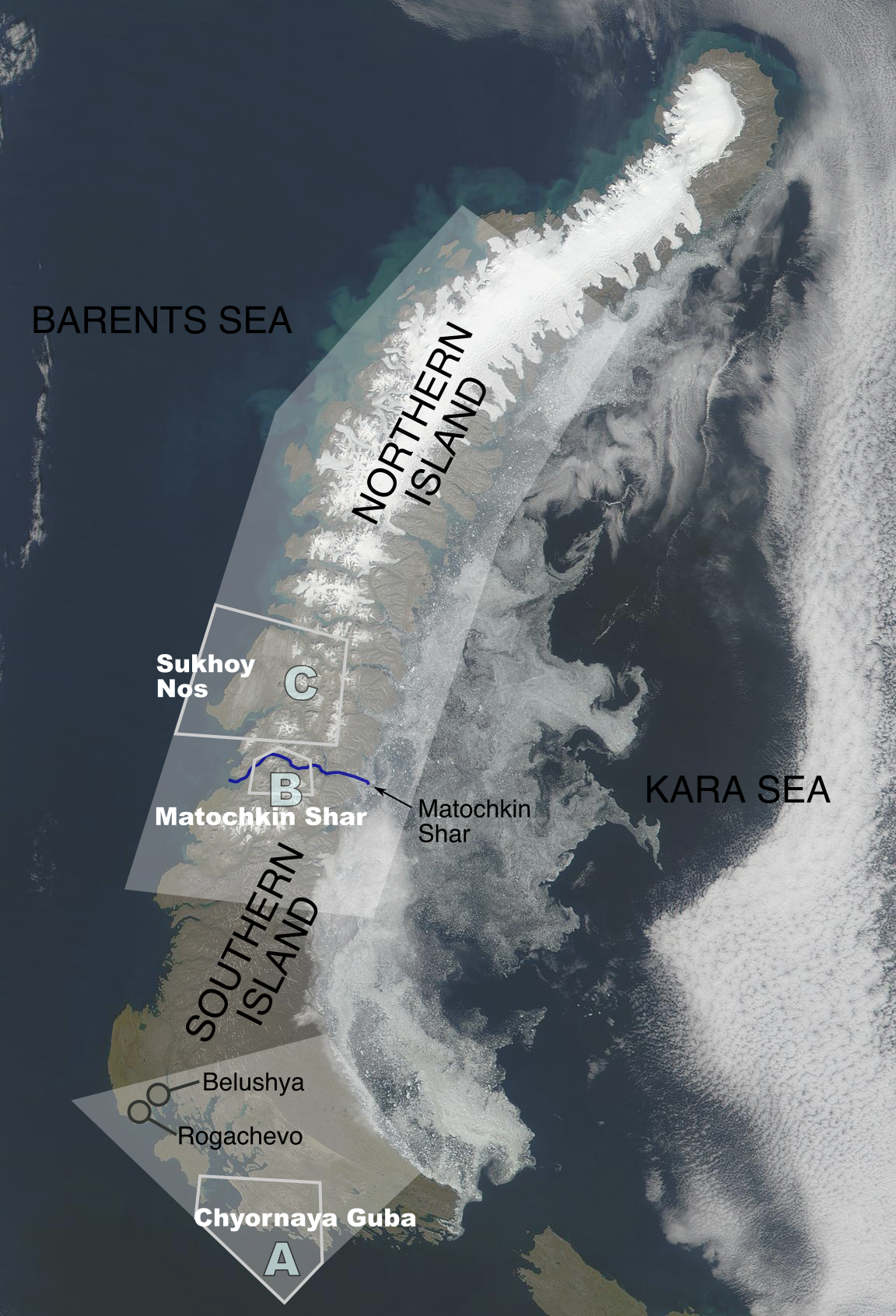
- Novaya Zemlya was the site of the world's largest nuclear explosion, the 50 Mt Tsar Bomba

Site information
- Type: Nuclear test site
- Operator: Russian Federation (formerly Soviet Union)
- Status: Active

Location
- Novaya Zemlya Test Site boundaries and facilities
- Area: land: 55,200 km^{2} (21,300 sq mi) water: 36,000 km^{2} (14,000 sq mi)

Site history
- In use: 1955–present

Test information
- Subcritical tests: not known
- Nuclear tests: 224

In July 1954, Novaya Zemlya was designated as the nuclear weapons testing venue, construction of which began in October and existed during much of the Cold War. "Zone A", Chyornaya Guba (70.7°N 54.6°E), was used in 1955–1962 and 1972–1975. "Zone B", Matochkin Shar (73.4°N 54.9°E), was used for underground tests in 1964–1990. "Zone C", Sukhoy Nos (73.7°N 54.0°E), was used in 1958–1961 and was the site of the 1961 test of the Tsar Bomba, the most powerful nuclear weapon ever detonated.

Other tests occurred elsewhere throughout the islands, with an official testing range covering over half of the landmass. In September 1961, two propelled thermonuclear warheads were launched from Vorkuta Sovetsky and Salekhard to target areas on Novaya Zemlya. The launch rocket was subsequently deployed to Cuba.

1963 saw the implementation of the Limited Test Ban Treaty which banned most atmospheric nuclear tests. The largest underground test in Novaya Zemlya took place on September 12, 1973, involving four nuclear devices of 4.2 megatons total yield. Although far smaller in blast power than the Tsar Bomba and other atmospheric tests, the confinement of the blasts underground led to pressures rivaling natural earthquakes. In the case of the September 12, 1973 test, a seismic magnitude of 6.97 on the Richter scale was reached, setting off an 80-million-ton avalanche that blocked two glacial streams and created a lake 2 kilometres (1.2 mi) in length.

Over its history as a nuclear test site, Novaya Zemlya hosted 224 nuclear detonations with a total explosive energy equivalent to 265 megatons of TNT. For comparison, all explosives used in World War II, including the detonations of two US nuclear bombs, amounted to only two megatons. A 2015 expedition measuring the glaciers of Novaya Zemlya reported 65–130 times more radioactivity than the background in neighboring areas.

In 1988–1989, glasnost helped make the Novaya Zemlya testing activities public knowledge, and in 1990 Greenpeace activists staged a protest at the site. The last nuclear test explosion was in 1990 (also the last for the entire Soviet Union and Russia). The Ministry for Atomic Energy has performed a series of subcritical underwater nuclear experiments near Matochkin Shar each autumn since 1998. These tests reportedly involve up to 100 grams (3.5 oz) of weapons-grade plutonium.

In October 2012, it was reported that Russia would resume subcritical nuclear testing at "Zone B". In spring 2013, construction of what would become a new tunnel and four buildings was initiated near the Severny settlement, 3 kilometres (1.9 mi) west-northwest to the Mount Lazarev.

In 2023, CNN reported that commercial satellite imagery showed new tunneling activity and surface construction at Novaya Zemlya test sites (including published imagery at 73.385°N 54.740°E) that indicated possible preparation for resumption of nuclear testing.

== Population ==
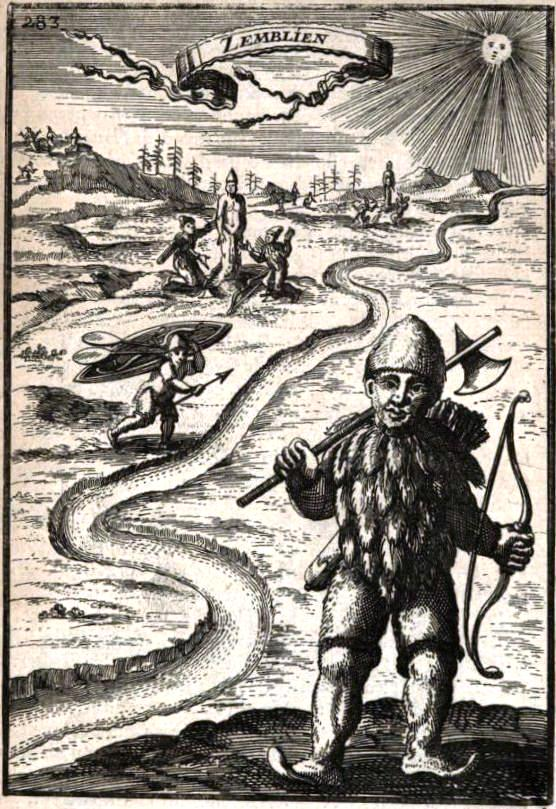
A perception of a "Zemblien", a Novaya Zemlya native, by a 17th-century French traveller

Historical population
Year	Pop.	±%
1911	108	—
1936	390	+261.1%
1955	536	+37.4%
2002	2,716	+406.7%
2010	2,429	−10.6%
2021	2,302	−5.2%
Source: Census data and estimates

A 17th-century traveller to the North, ship surgeon Pierre Martin de La Martinière, gave a description of the indigenous population of the archipelago, whom he called Zembliens, from Nova Zembla or Nouvelle Zemble for "Novaya Zemlya". He noted that the Zembliens worshipped the Sun and wooden idols.

In 1870s several Nenets families were resettled from elsewhere as part of the colonization of the territory by the Russian Empire, which established a settlement of Malye Karmakuly (Малые Кармакулы).

The indigenous population (from 1872 to the 1950s) consisted of about 50–300 Nenets who subsisted mainly on fishing, trapping, reindeer herding, polar bear hunting and seal hunting. Natural resources include copper, lead, and zinc.

The entire civilian population was transferred to the mainland in 1957 before nuclear testing began.

The population of Novaya Zemlya as of the 2010 Census was about 2,429, of whom 1,972 resided in Belushya Guba, an urban settlement that is the administrative center of Novaya Zemlya District. 457 more persons resided in the second largest settlement of Rogachevo. The population consists mainly of military and construction workers. Severny Island is virtually unpopulated.

== Geography and geology ==
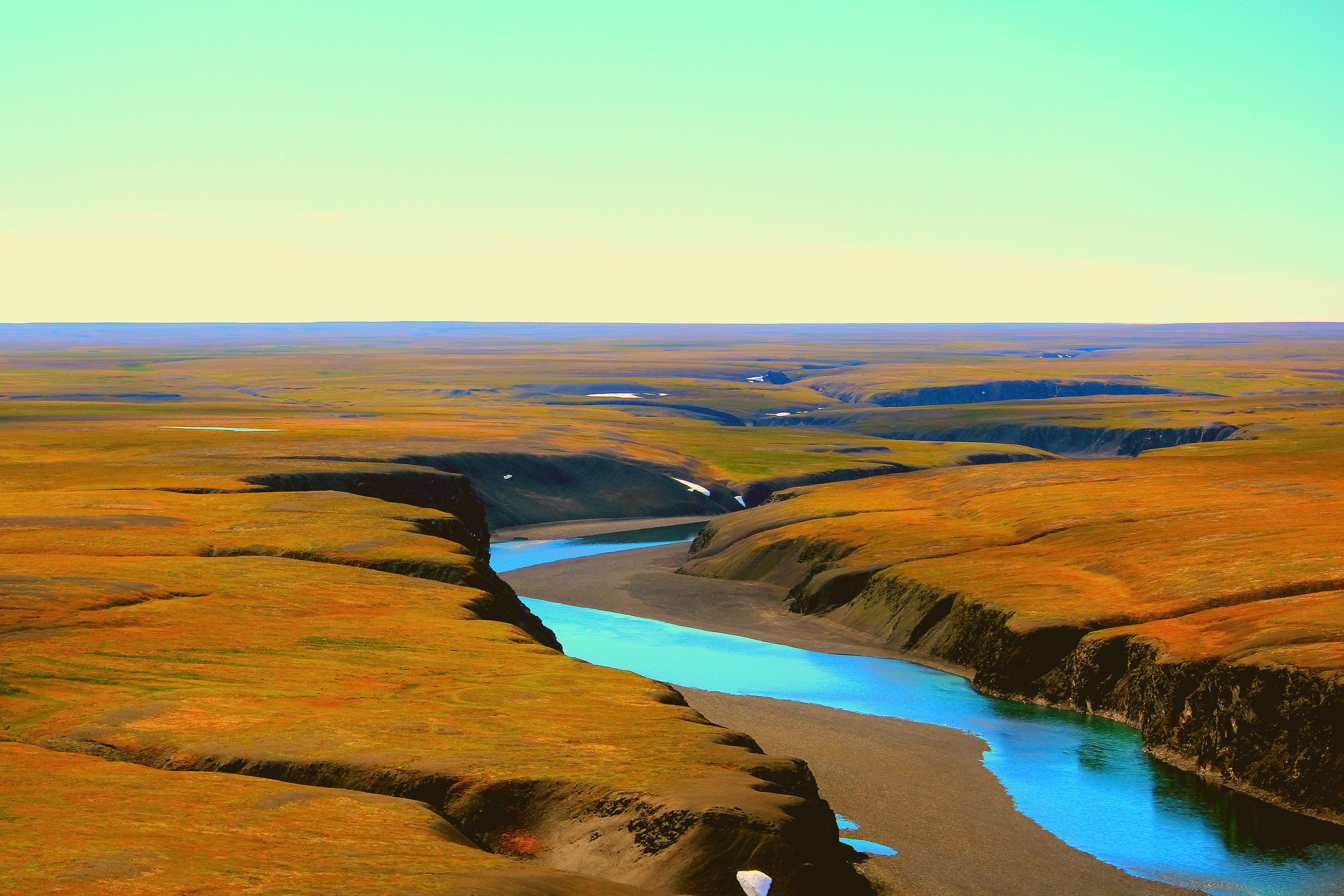
Landscape in Novaya Zemlya, Russian Arctic National Park

Novaya Zemlya is an extension of the northern part of the Ural Mountains, and the interior is mountainous throughout. It is separated from the mainland by the Kara Strait. Novaya Zemlya consists of two major islands, separated by the narrow Matochkin Strait, as well as a number of smaller islands. The two main islands are:

- Severny (Northern), which has a large ice cap, the Severny Island ice cap, as well as many active glaciers. It has an area of 48,904 square kilometres (18,882 sq mi).
- Yuzhny (Southern), which is largely unglaciated and has a tundra landscape. It has an area of 33,275 square kilometres (12,800 sq mi).

The coast of Novaya Zemlya is very indented, and it is the area with the largest number of fjords in the Russian Federation. Novaya Zemlya separates the Barents Sea from the Kara Sea. The total area is about 83,000 square kilometers (32,000 sq mi). The highest mountain is located on the Northern island and is 1,547 meters (5,075 ft) high.

Compared to other regions that were under large ice sheets during the last glacial period, Novaya Zemlya shows relatively little isostatic rebound. Possibly this is indebted to a counter-effect created by the growth of glaciers during the last few thousand years.

=== Geology ===
The geology of Novaya Zemlya is dominated by a large anticlinal structure that forms an extension of the Ural Mountains. The geology is primarily formed of Paleozoic sedimentary rocks, including both carbonate and siliciclastic rocks spanning the Cambrian to Permian, ranging from deep marine turbidites and flysch to shallow marine and terrestrial sandstones and reef limestones. Small areas of late Neoproterozoic (~600 mya) granite and associated metasedimentary rocks are also exposed.

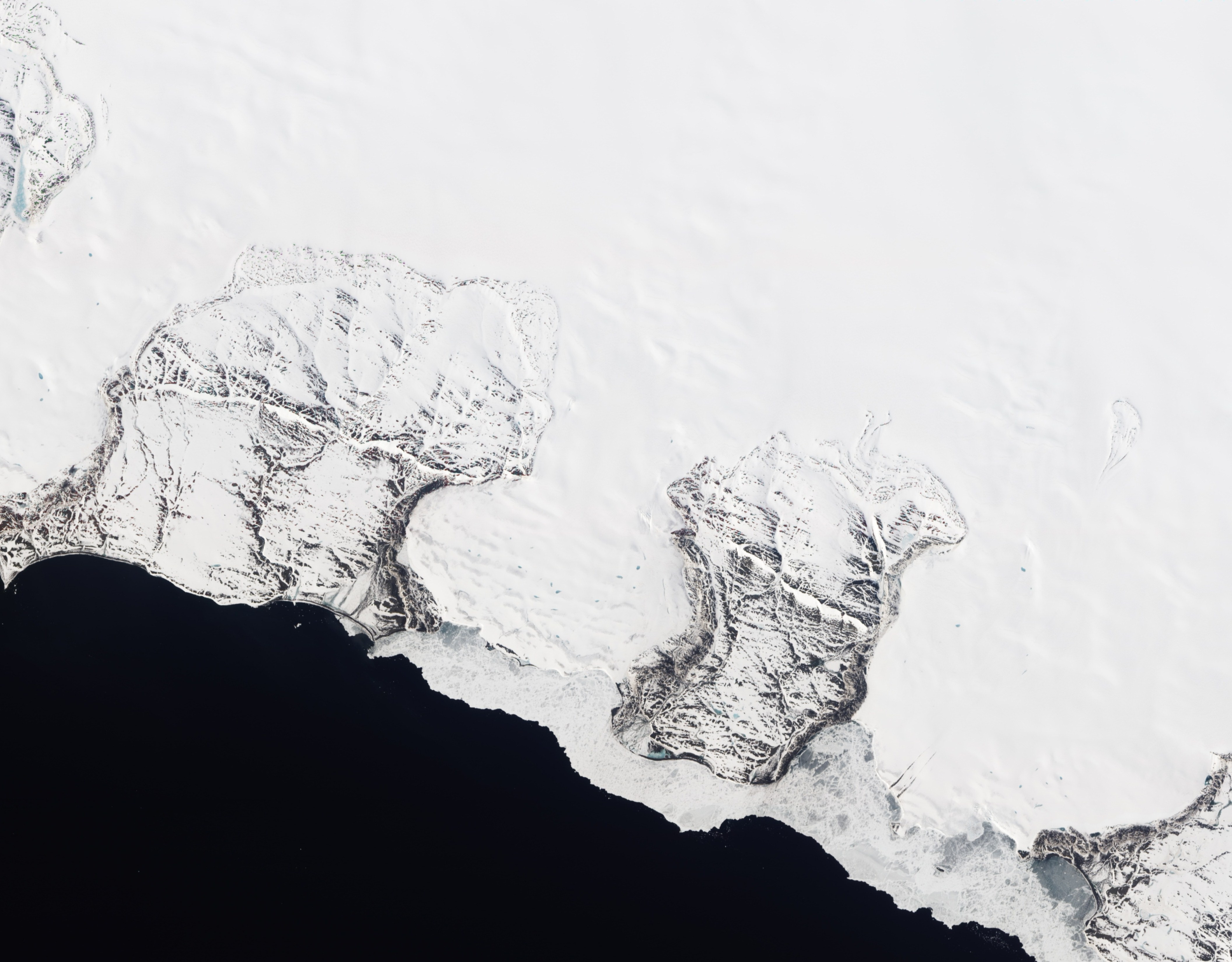
Natural-color satellite image of the Nordenskiöld Glacier group. East coast, Severny

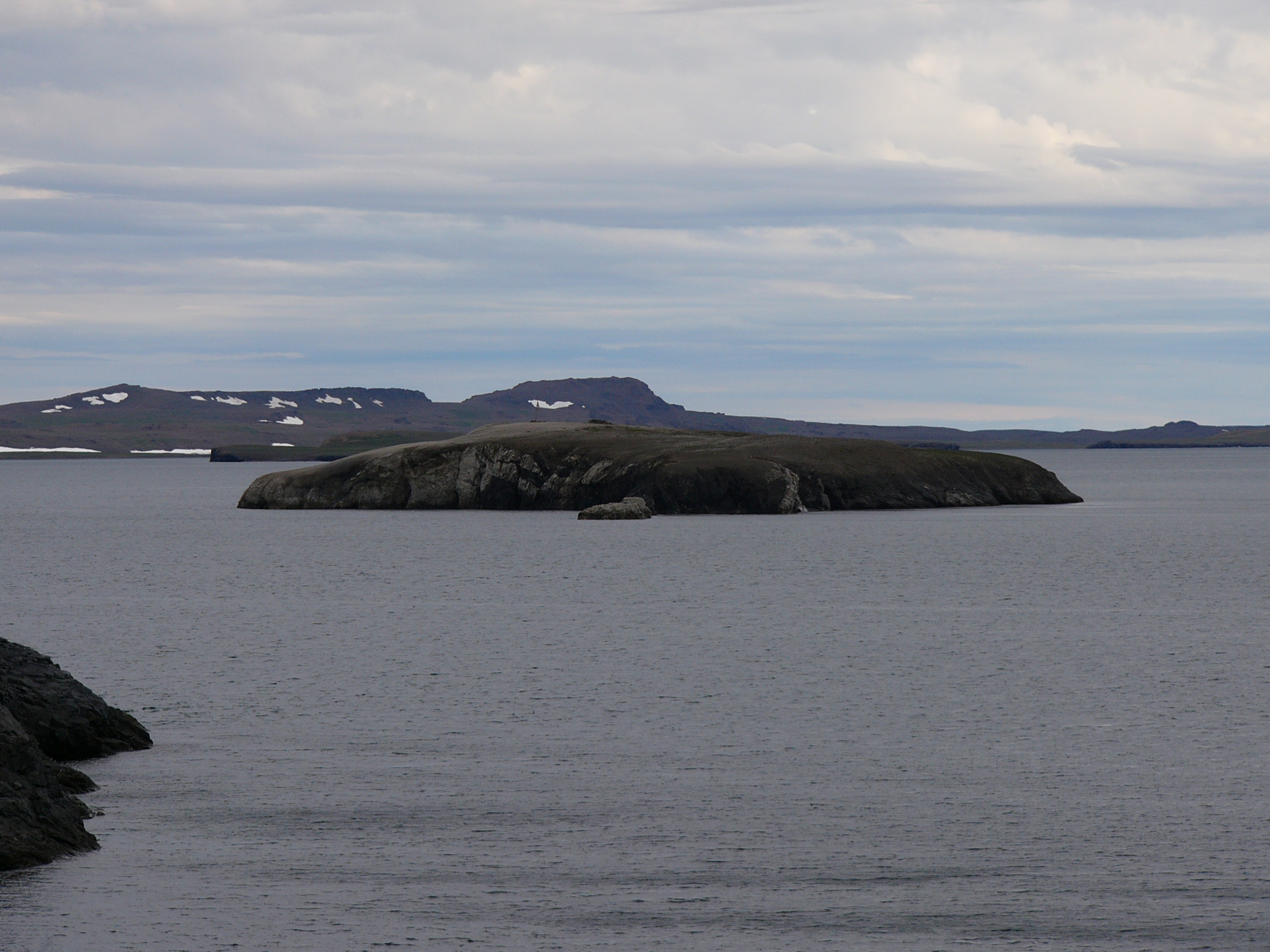
Wide shot of Novaya Zemlya

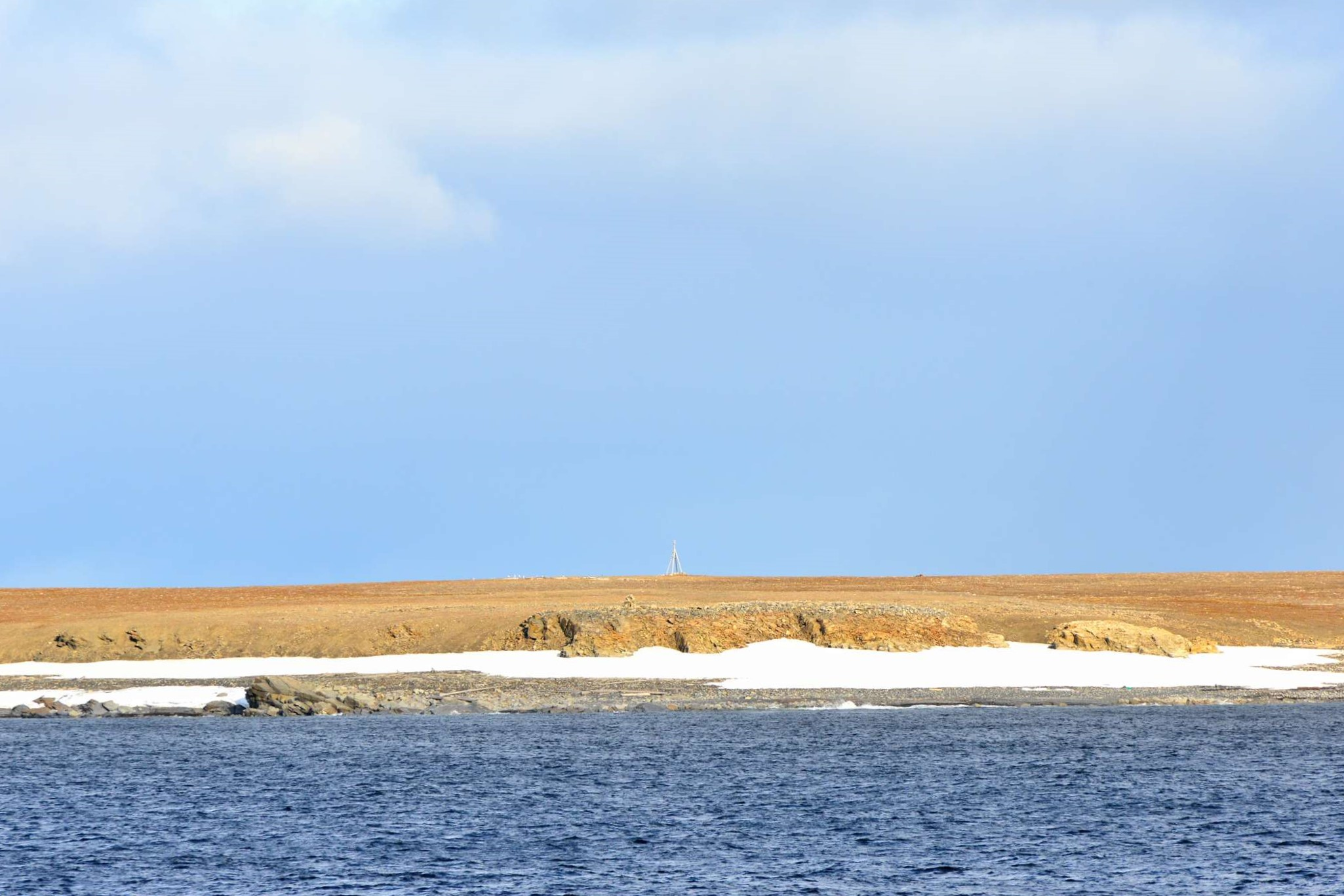
Barents Bay (Willem Barents' gravesite; 76°27′N 68°42′E)

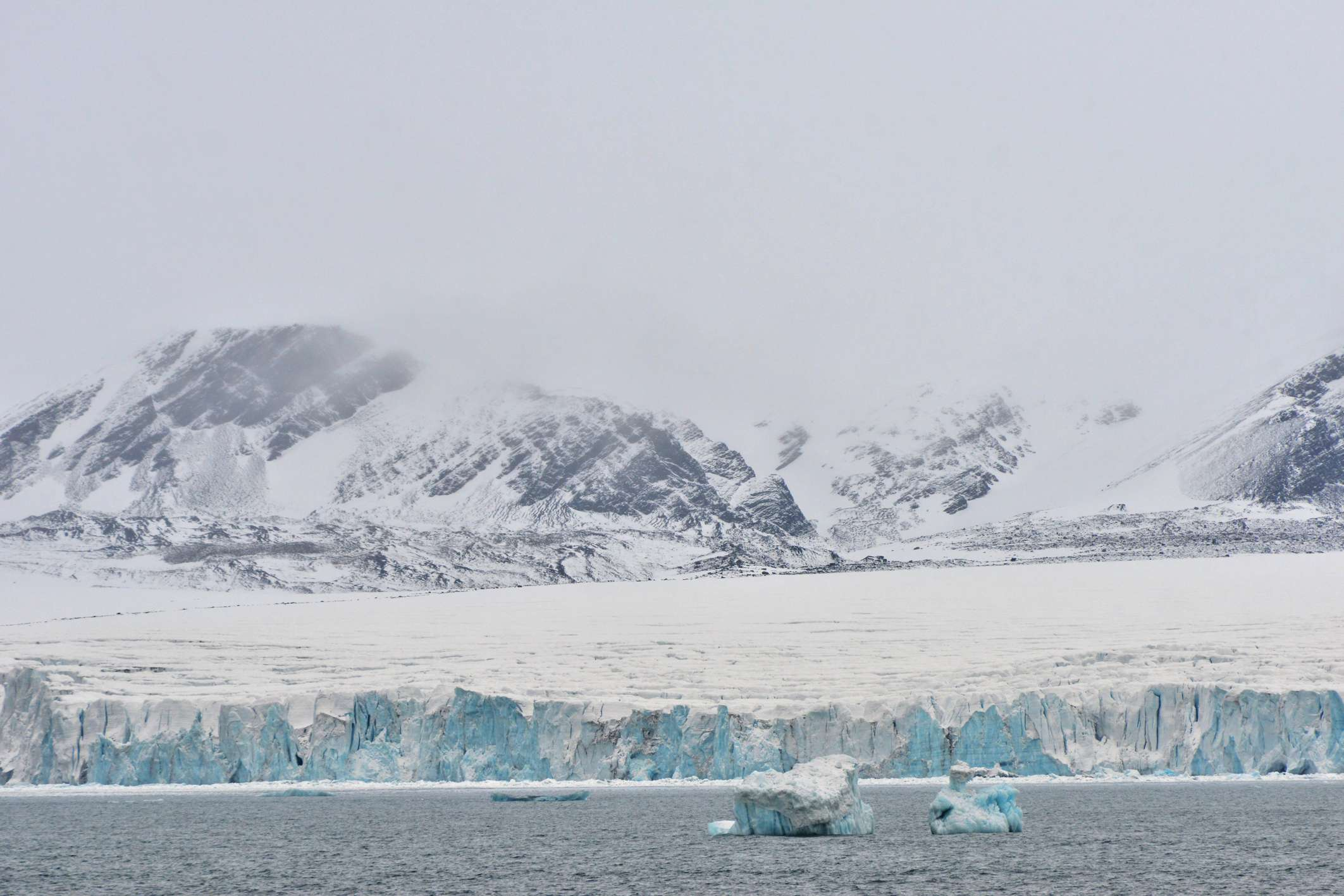
Inostrantsev Glacier terminus (76°28′N 66°5′E)

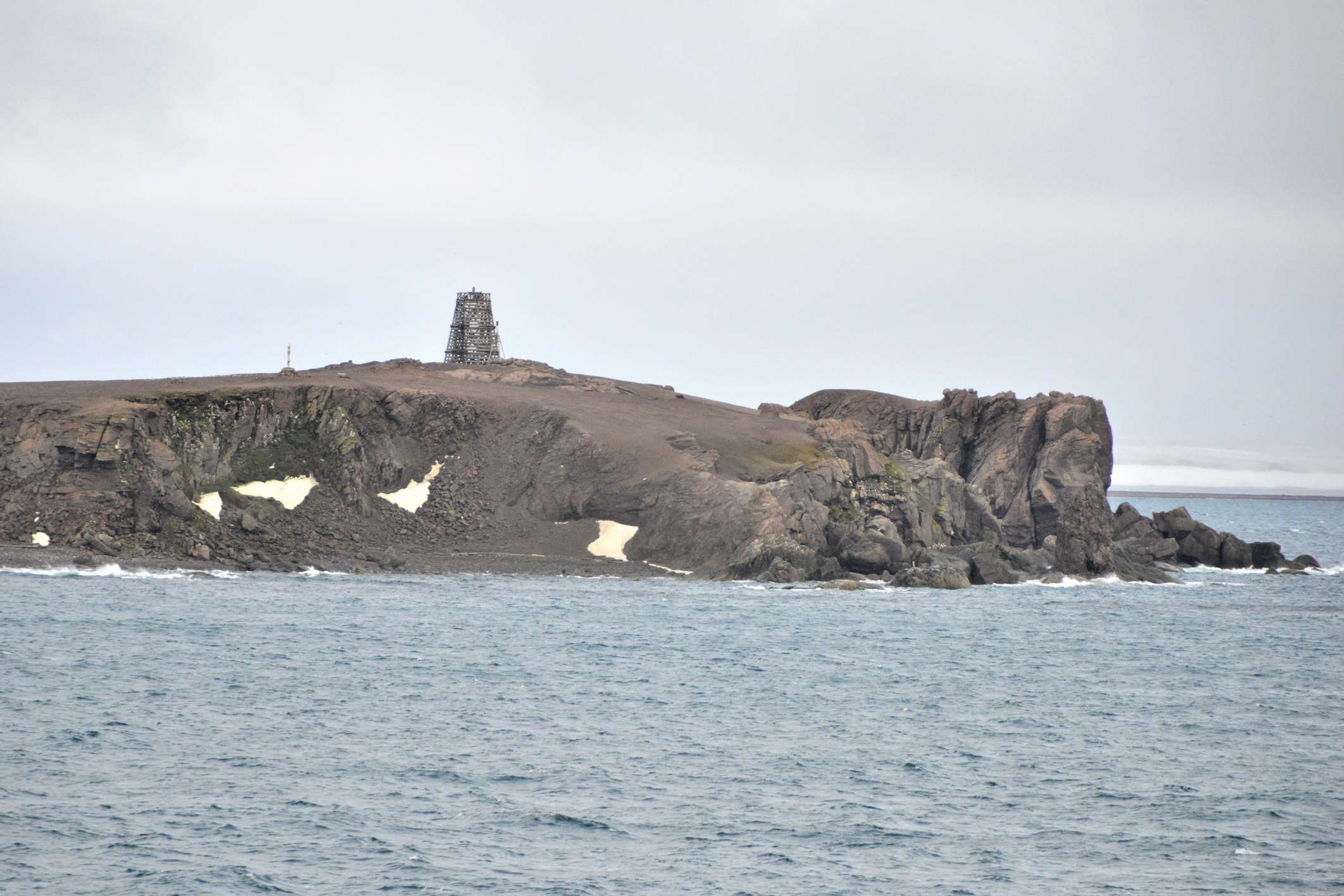
Cape Zhelaniya (Northernmost cape of Severny; 76°57′N 68°35′E)

== Environment ==
=== Climate ===
Novaya Zemlya has a maritime-influenced variety of a tundra climate (Köppen ET). Due to some effect from the Gulf Stream and its offshore position, winters are much less severe than in much lower latitudes inland in Siberia, but instead last up to eight months a year. The milder waters to its west delays the onset of sea ice and causes vast seasonal lag in shoulder seasons. Due to latitudinal differences, the temperatures and daylight varies quite a bit throughout the archipelago, with the Malye Karmakuly station being located in the southern part. Novaya Zemlya is cloudy in general, but snowfall and rainfall is relatively scarce for being a maritime location. Even so, glaciers dominate the northern interior and there is strong snow accumulation each winter due to the length of the season.

Climate data for Malye Karmakuly, Novaya Zemlya
Month	Jan	Feb	Mar	Apr	May	Jun	Jul	Aug	Sep	Oct	Nov	Dec	Year
Record high °C (°F)	2.6 (36.7)	3.0 (37.4)	3.3 (37.9)	7.8 (46.0)	17.6 (63.7)	22.2 (72.0)	28.3 (82.9)	27.3 (81.1)	19.7 (67.5)	9.7 (49.5)	4.5 (40.1)	2.5 (36.5)	28.3 (82.9)
Mean daily maximum °C (°F)	−9.9 (14.2)	−10.3 (13.5)	−8.6 (16.5)	−5.2 (22.6)	−0.7 (30.7)	5.3 (41.5)	10.4 (50.7)	9.1 (48.4)	6.0 (42.8)	0.5 (32.9)	−3.9 (25.0)	−6.8 (19.8)	−1.2 (29.8)
Daily mean °C (°F)	−12.8 (9.0)	−13.2 (8.2)	−11.4 (11.5)	−8.1 (17.4)	−2.9 (26.8)	3.1 (37.6)	7.7 (45.9)	7.0 (44.6)	4.4 (39.9)	−1.2 (29.8)	−6.1 (21.0)	−9.4 (15.1)	−3.6 (25.5)
Mean daily minimum °C (°F)	−15.7 (3.7)	−16.1 (3.0)	−14.2 (6.4)	−10.8 (12.6)	−4.9 (23.2)	1.4 (34.5)	5.6 (42.1)	5.2 (41.4)	2.8 (37.0)	−3.1 (26.4)	−8.4 (16.9)	−12.1 (10.2)	−5.9 (21.4)
Record low °C (°F)	−36.0 (−32.8)	−37.4 (−35.3)	−40.0 (−40.0)	−29.9 (−21.8)	−25.9 (−14.6)	−9.6 (14.7)	−2.8 (27.0)	−1.7 (28.9)	−9.9 (14.2)	−21.1 (−6.0)	−29.1 (−20.4)	−36.2 (−33.2)	−40.0 (−40.0)
Average precipitation mm (inches)	25 (1.0)	22 (0.9)	20 (0.8)	18 (0.7)	15 (0.6)	22 (0.9)	36 (1.4)	31 (1.2)	37 (1.5)	33 (1.3)	22 (0.9)	26 (1.0)	304 (12.0)
Average rainy days	1	1	1.1	2	4	10	15	18	18	9	3	1.2	83
Average snowy days	18	16	18	16	15	7	0.4	0.1	3	13	16	19	142
Average relative humidity (%)	78	77	77	76	78	81	83	83	85	82	79	78	80
Mean monthly sunshine hours	0	25	107	215	189	173	229	143	73	40	3	0	1,197
Source 1: Pogoda.ru.net
Source 2: NOAA (sun 1961–1990)

=== Ecology ===
The ecology of Novaya Zemlya is influenced by its severe climate, but the region nevertheless supports a diversity of biota. One of the most notable species present is the polar bear, whose population in the Barents Sea region is genetically distinct from other polar bear subpopulations. Novoya Zemlya is also home to several species of birds, such as the black guillemot, glaucous gull, thick-billed murre, and long-tailed duck, among many more.

Polar bears enter human-inhabited areas more frequently than previously, which has been attributed to climate change. Global warming reduces sea ice, forcing the bears to come inland to find food. In February 2019, a mass migration occurred in the northeastern portion of Novaya Zemlya. Dozens of polar bears were seen entering homes, public buildings, and inhabited areas, so Arkhangelsk region authorities declared a state of emergency on Saturday, February 16, 2019.

Other mammals present in Novaya Zemlya include small animals such as the Norway lemming and arctic fox. The discovery of Norway lemming is recent and may suggest the population of a new subspecies. Two species of seal, the ringed seal and bearded seal, live on the islands; these species are valuable to the food chain, as they serve as prey for polar bears and killer whales while feeding on fish such as arctic cod.

The islands are home to many species of flora. The lingonberry is one of the only edible plants present. Tilesius wormwood, the alpine poppy, several species of buttercup, and the tiny forget-me-not are also notable. Lichen is also very common in the area.

== In popular culture ==
- In Clive Cussler's 1976 novel Raise the Titanic!, Nova Zemlya is the location of a rare mineral, byzanium, mined secretly by Americans in 1911. A map of the island is provided.
- In Pale Fire (1962), Kinbote's home country is named Zembla, and references to Novaya Zemlya are made throughout the novel.
- In 2011, a Dutch feature film, Nova Zembla, depicted the last journey of Willem Barentsz.

== See also ==
- List of fjords of Russia
- List of islands of Russia
- Novaya Zemlya effect
- Gusinaya Zemlya
- Novaya Zemlya (2008 film)
- Nova Zembla (2011 film)
- Tsar Bomba
- Gora Severny Nunatak
- Mezhdusharsky Island
