= Severny Island =

Uninhabited island in Russian Arctic

Severny
Native name: Се́верный о́стров

- Location within Russia

Geography
- Location: Arkhangelsk Oblast, Russia
- Coordinates: 75°30′N 60°00′E
- Archipelago: Novaya Zemlya
- Area: 48,904 km^{2} (18,882 sq mi)
- Area rank: 30th
- Highest elevation: 1,547 m (5075 ft)
- Highest point: Mount Kruzenshtern

Administration
- Russia
- Oblast: Arkhangelsk Oblast

Demographics
- Population: 0 (2000)

Severny Island (Russian: Се́верный о́стров, romanized: Severnyy ostrov, lit. 'Northern Island') is a Russian Arctic island. It is the northern island of the Novaya Zemlya archipelago. It was historically called Lütke Land after Friedrich Benjamin von Lütke, who explored it. It lies approximately 400 km north of the Russian mainland. It has an area of 48,904 square kilometres (18,882 sq mi), making it the 30th-largest island in the world and the 3rd-largest uninhabited island in the world, although there was formerly a settlement at Lagerni on the northern shore of the narrow Matochkin Strait. It is part of the Russian Arctic National Park (along with Franz Josef Land which lies to the north).

== Geography ==
Severny Island is separated from Yuzhny Island (Southern) by the narrow Matochkin Strait. Forty percent of the island is covered by the Severny Island ice cap, which is the largest glacier by area and by volume in Europe (if counted as part of it). Severny Island is known for its numerous glaciers. Cape Flissingsky is the easternmost point of Severny Island, while Cape Zhelaniya is the northernmost point; the most westerly point is Sukhoy Nos.

== Climate ==
Severny Island has a cold tundra climate (Köppen climate classification ET), with average temperatures barely reaching the freezing mark in the warmest months. The temperature varies from −37 to −5 °C (−35 to 23 °F) in winter to −9 to 5 °C (16 to 41 °F) in summer.

Climate data for Severny Island
Month	Jan	Feb	Mar	Apr	May	Jun	Jul	Aug	Sep	Oct	Nov	Dec	Year
Mean maximum °C (°F)	−7 (19)	−7 (19)	−6 (21)	−4 (25)	−1 (30)	3 (37)	5 (41)	4 (39)	1 (34)	−1 (30)	−4 (25)	−5 (23)	5 (41)
Mean daily maximum °C (°F)	−19 (−2)	−18 (0)	−15 (5)	−12 (10)	−6 (21)	−2 (28)	0 (32)	−1 (30)	−3 (27)	−8 (18)	−13 (9)	−17 (1)	−9 (15)
Mean daily minimum °C (°F)	−26 (−15)	−25 (−13)	−23 (−9)	−19 (−2)	−10 (14)	−5 (23)	−2 (28)	−4 (25)	−6 (21)	−13 (9)	−20 (−4)	−24 (−11)	−15 (6)
Mean minimum °C (°F)	−37 (−35)	−36 (−33)	−34 (−29)	−29 (−20)	−18 (0)	−9 (16)	−6 (21)	−8 (18)	−12 (10)	−22 (−8)	−30 (−22)	−35 (−31)	−37 (−35)
Average precipitation mm (inches)	24 (0.9)	28 (1.1)	31 (1.2)	33 (1.3)	33 (1.3)	38 (1.5)	44 (1.7)	47 (1.9)	62 (2.4)	64 (2.5)	42 (1.7)	32 (1.3)	478 (18.8)
Average precipitation days (≥ 0.1 mm)	11.1	11.1	13.4	14.7	14.8	13.8	12.9	14.2	18.8	20.1	15.6	14.3	174.8
Average snowy days	11.1	11.1	13.4	14.6	14.7	12.1	7.5	8.6	15.9	19.8	15.5	14.3	158.6
Source: Meteoblue

=== Ice cap and glaciers ===
Unlike Yuzhny Island, Severny has an inner ice cap with numerous glaciers, most of which have their terminus on the eastern or western shore of the island.

== History ==
The cape of Sukhoy Nos, located at the southern end of the island, was used for nuclear weapons testing between 1958 and 1961. The Tsar Bomba hydrogen bomb test on October 30, 1961, destroyed all buildings in the village of Severny (both wooden and brick). The village was located 55 kilometres (34 miles) from ground zero within the Sukhoy Nos test range. Tsar Bomba was the most powerful nuclear weapon detonated and was the most powerful anthropogenic explosion in human history. It had a yield of 50 megatons of TNT, scaled down from its maximum 100 megaton design yield. Severny is now the site of a Russian Army base and has a harbor.

There is a meteorological station at Cape Zhelaniya, Severny's northernmost cape.

== Gallery ==
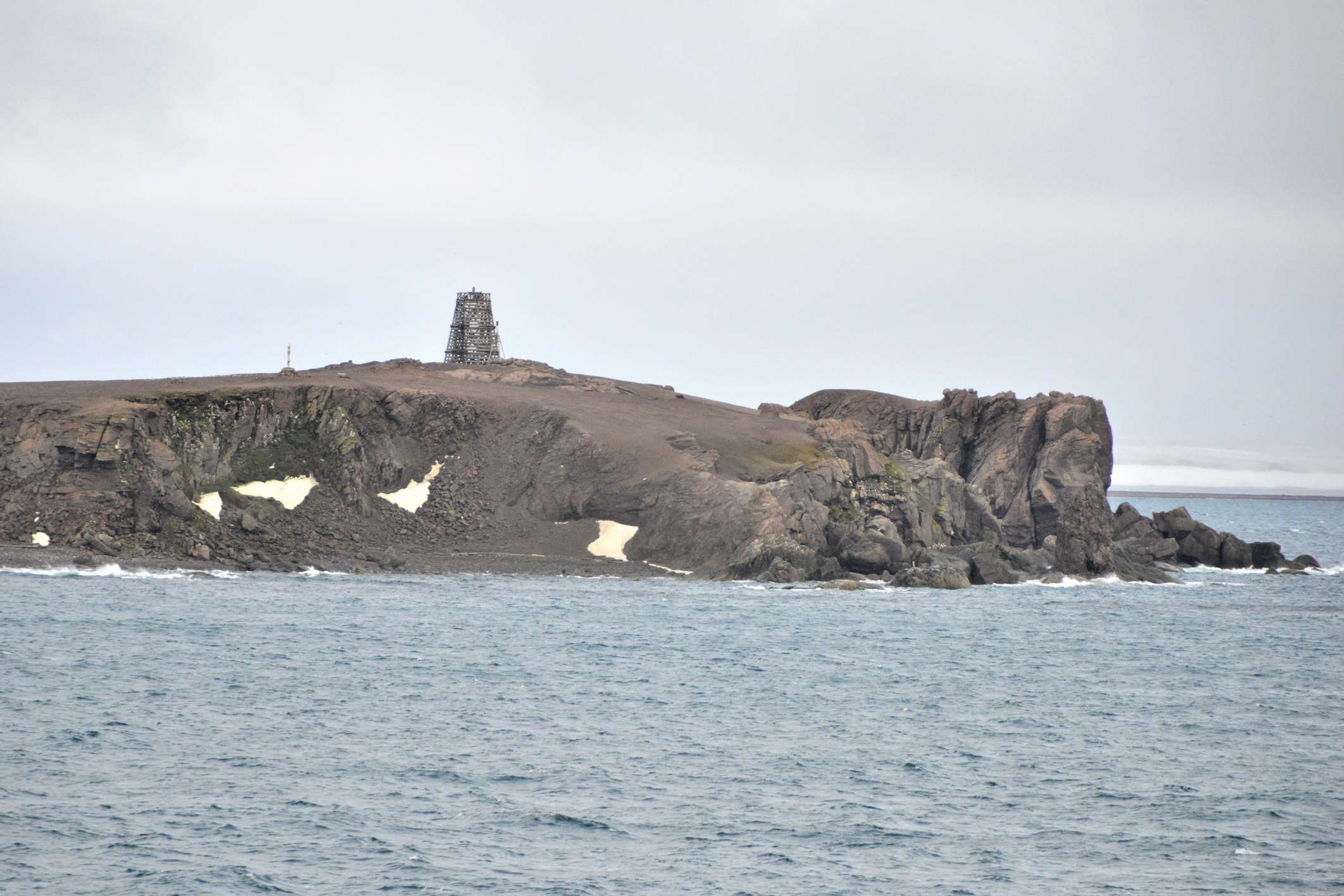
View of Cape Zhelaniya.

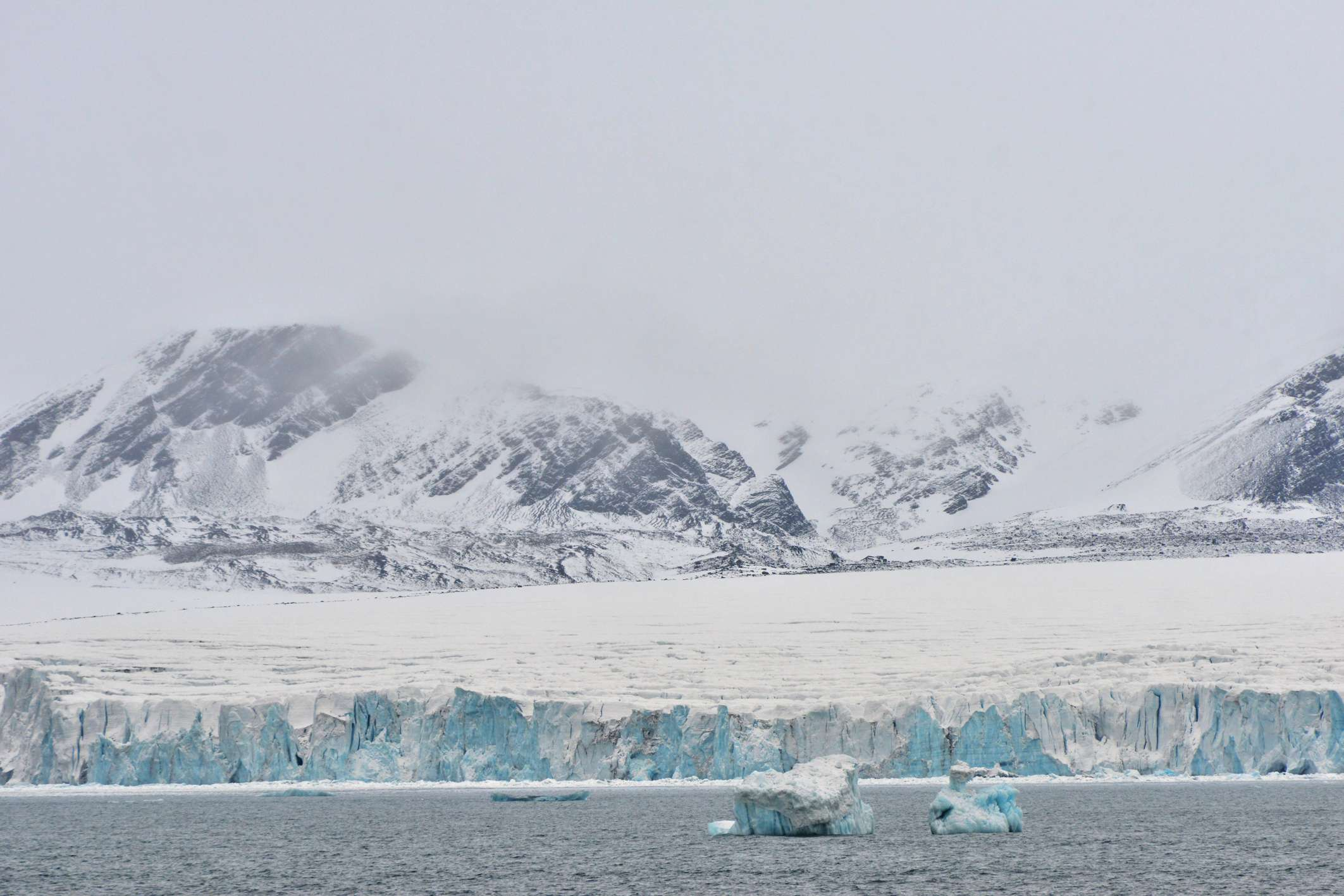
Inostrantsev Glacier terminus. West coast.

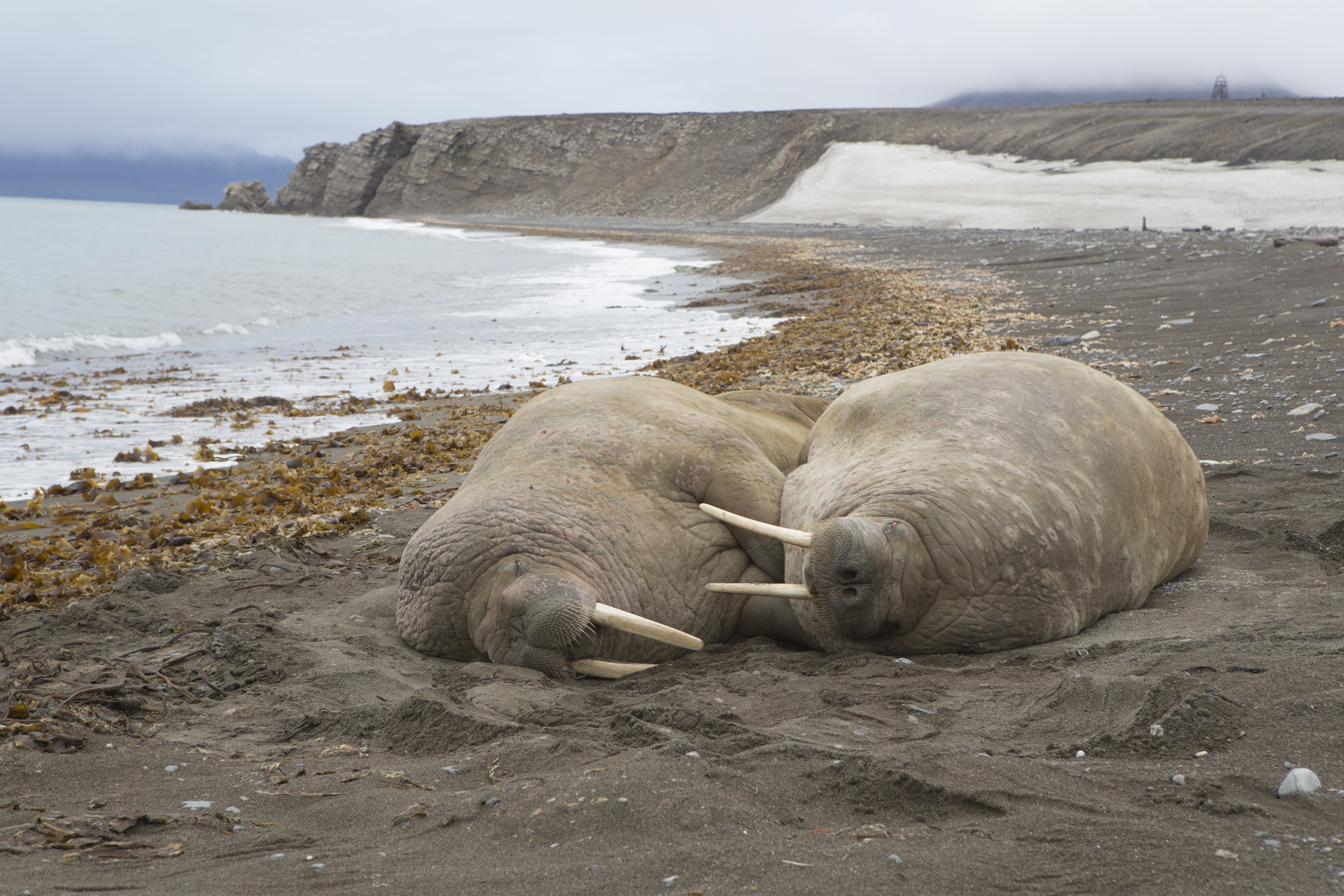
Walruses resting on the shore of Severny Island.

== See also ==
- Desert island
- Gora Severny Nunatak
- List of islands of Russia
- List of glaciers in Russia
- List of fjords of Russia
- Tsar Bomba
