= Yuzhny Island =

Island of the Novaya Zemlya archipelago

Yuzhny
Native name: Южный остров

- Location within Russia

Geography
- Location: Arkhangelsk Oblast, Russia
- Coordinates: 72°N 54°E
- Archipelago: Novaya Zemlya
- Area: 33,275 km^{2} (12,848 sq mi)
- Area rank: 41st
- Highest elevation: 1,291 m (4236 ft)
- Highest point: Mount Pervosvotrennaya

Administration
- Russia
- Oblast: Arkhangelsk Oblast
- Largest settlement: Belushya Guba

Yuzhny Island (Russian: Южный остров, romanized: Yuzhniy ostrov, lit. 'southern island') is the southern island of Russia's Novaya Zemlya archipelago, lying north of mainland Russia. It has an area of 33,275 square kilometres (12,800 sq mi), which while smaller than the northern island of Severny, still makes it one of the largest islands in the world. It is separated from Severny Island by the narrow Matochkin Strait, which is covered with ice most of the year. West of Yuzhny Island lies the Barents Sea, to the north the Arctic Ocean, to the east the Kara Sea, and to the south the Pechora Sea.

== History ==
Originally home to the Nenets people, the island was largely evacuated in the 1950s to make way for nuclear weapons testing.

== Ecology ==
Yuzhny Island is known for its large seabird population. The island's vegetation largely consists of tundra.

== See also ==
- List of islands of Russia
