= Southernmost glacial mass in Europe =

The southernmost persistent glacial masses in Europe are mainly small glaciers, glacierets, and perennial firn fields and patches, located in the highest mountains of the three big southern European peninsulas - the Balkan, the Apennine, and the Iberian, the southernmost ranges of the Alps and the glaciers on the european northwestern slopes of the Greater Caucasus mountains in Russia. There are summer lasting snow patches in Sierra Nevada (Corral de la Veleta glacier at 37°03′24″ disappeared completely for a first time in 1913), in Mount Olympus (40°05′08″) (Kazania cirque), in Mount Korab (41°47′28″), in Rila Mountain (the cirque of the Seven Rila Lakes, Musala and Malyovitsa (42°10′25″) ridges), in Picos de Europa (43°11′51″) in the Cantabrian Mountains, in Mount Maglić (43°16′52″) and others. However, none of them have both persistency and indications of dynamic motion. In southern direction, some 4000 km away, are the glaciers in Africa in Rwenzori Mountains (00°23′09″N), Mount Kenya (00°09′03″S) and Mount Kilimanjaro (03°04′33″S).

List by latitude:

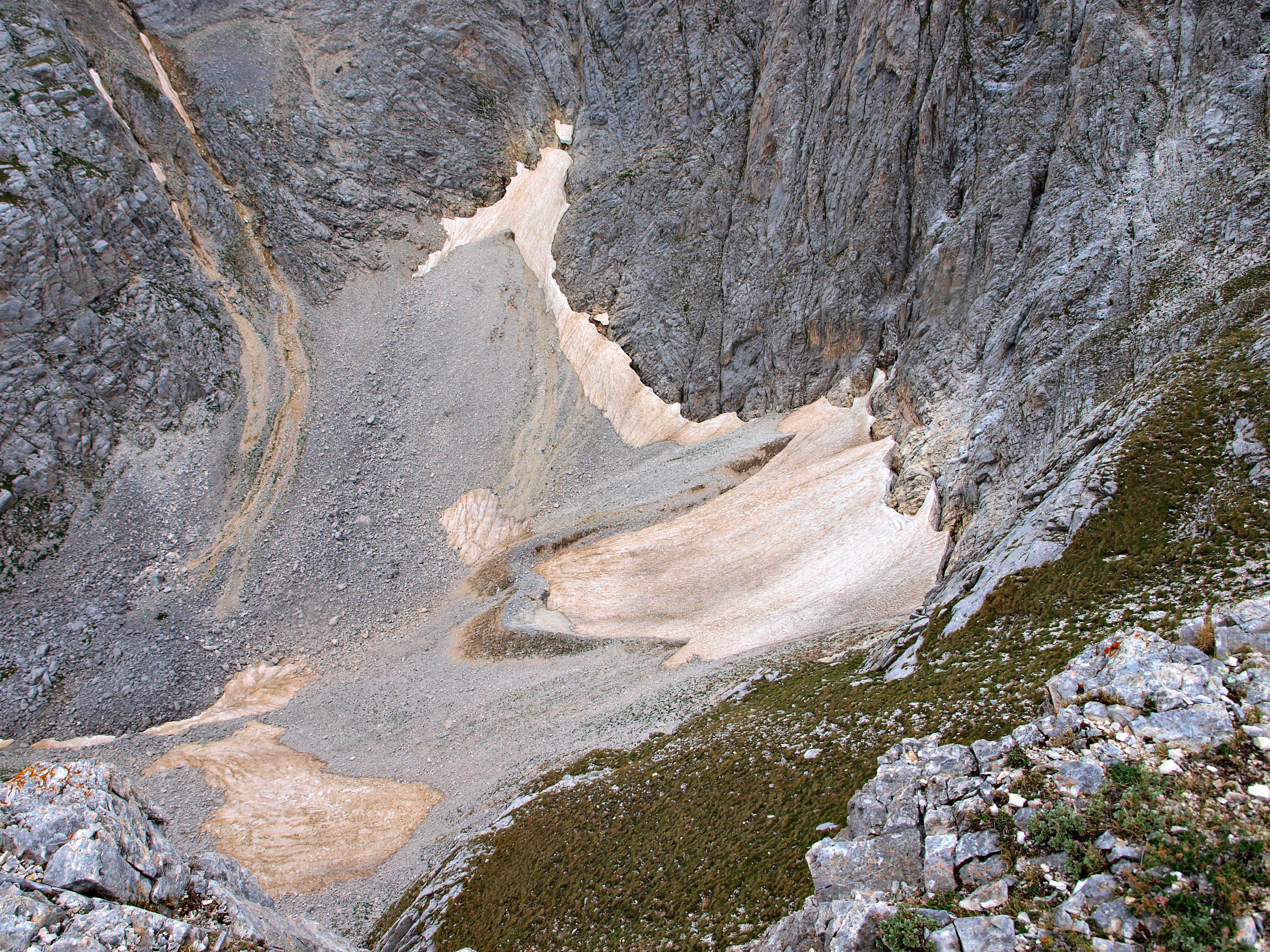
Snezhnika glacieret in July 2012

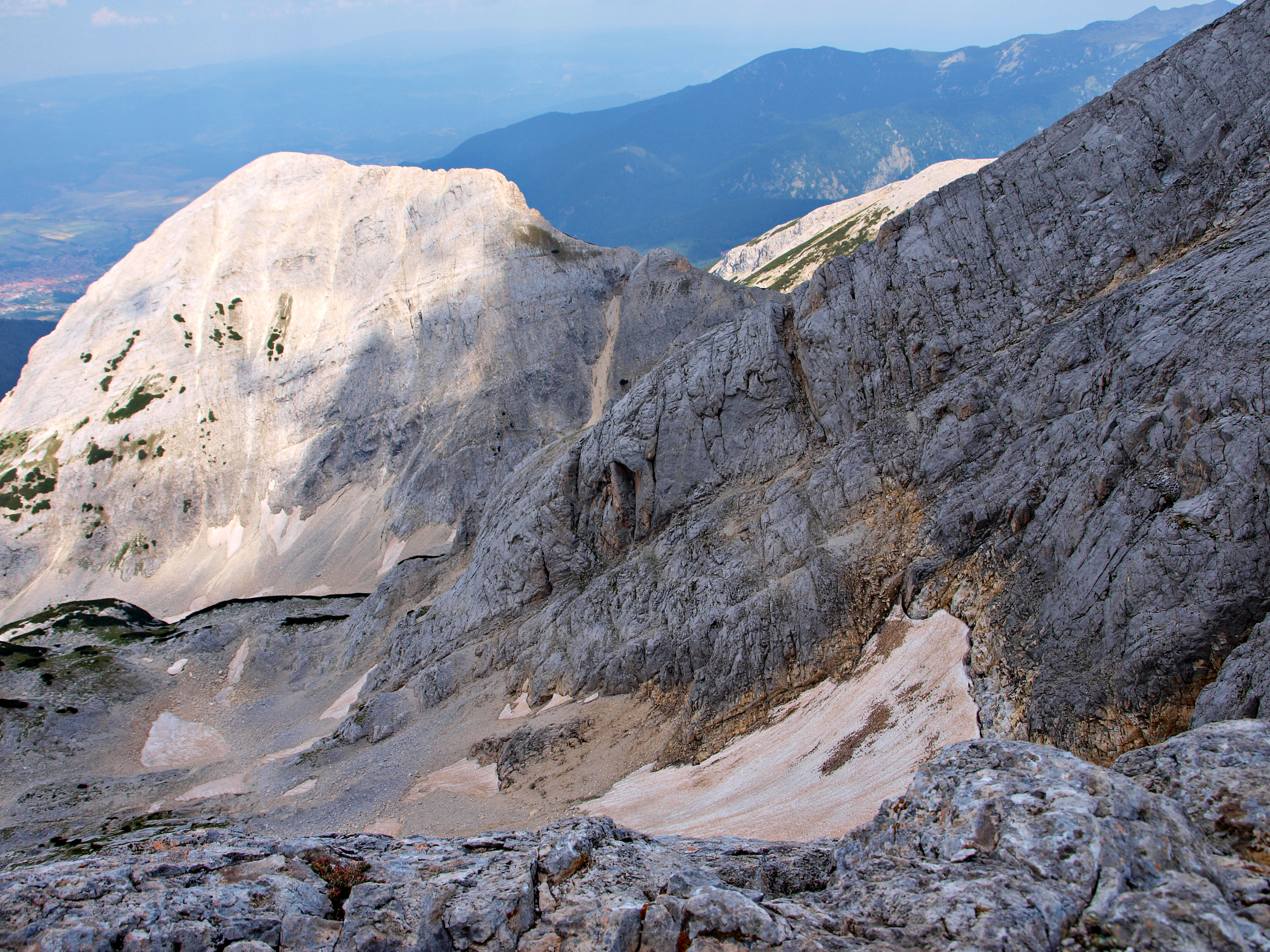
The Banski Suhodol Glacier in July 2012

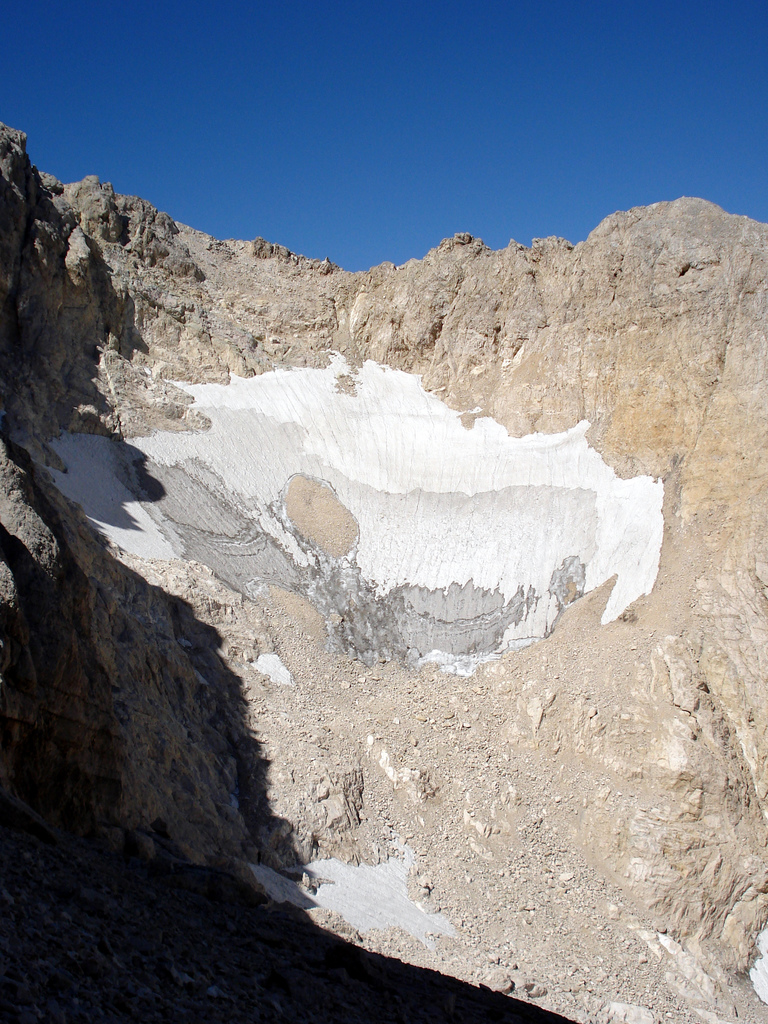
"Il Calderone” as seen in July 2007

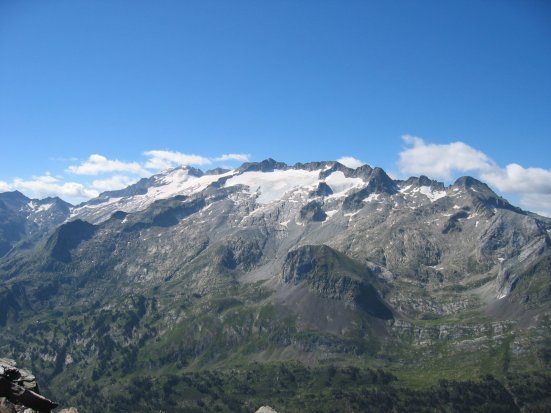
North face of Aneto with the glacier

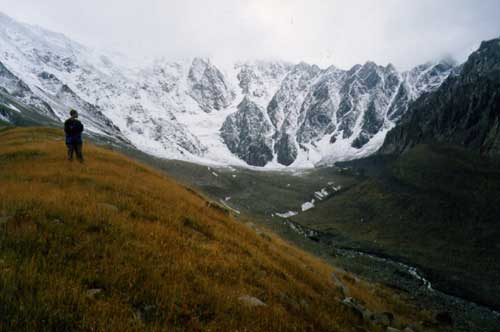
Kolka Glacier in 2001

1. Mount Bazardüzü northeast slope glaciers (41°13′28″), Greater Caucasus, Russia/Azerbaijan

2. Snezhnika glacieret (41°46′09″), Pirin massif, Bulgaria

3. Banski Suhodol Glacier (41°46′54″), Pirin mountain, Bulgaria

4. Mertur cirque glacier (42°23’55”), Hekurave range, Accursed Mountains, Albania

5. Maja Jezercë glaciers and glacierets (42°26’27”), Accursed Mountains, Albania

6. Calderone glacier (42°28′10”) Gran Sasso massif, Apennine Mountains, Italy

7. Kolata glacieret (42°29′00”), Kolata massif, Accursed Mountains, Albania/Montenegro

8. Aneto glacier (42°37′32”), Aneto-Maladeta, Pyrenees, Spain

9. Posets glacier (42°39′10”), Pyrenees, Spain

10. Monte Perdido glacier (42°40′38”), Pyrenees, Spain

11. Mount Jimara Glacier (42°43′15″), the european northwestern slopes of Mount Jimara, Khokh Range, Greater Caucasus, Russia

12. Kolka Glacier (42°44′23″), the european northwestern slopes of Mount Kazbek, Khokh Range, Greater Caucasus, Russia

13. Picos del infierno glacierets (42°46′49”), Pyrenees, Spain

14. Debeli Namet glacier (43°06′50”), Durmitor, Montenegro

15. Monte Clapier glacier (44°06′44″), Maritime Alps, Italy

16. Monte Argentera glaciers (44°10′40″), Maritime Alps, Italy

17. Triglav Glacier (46°22′41.999″N 13°50′12.001″E), Julian Alps, Slovenia

18. Skuta Glacier (46°21′50″N 14°33′11″E), Savinja Alps, Slovenia

== See also ==
- List of glaciers in Europe
- List of mountains in Albania
- List of mountains in Bulgaria
- List of European ultra-prominent peaks
- List of the highest European ultra-prominent peaks
- Most isolated major summits of Europe
