= Sneznik =

Sneznik may refer to:

- Děčínský Sněžník, a mountain in the Czech Republic
- Králický Sněžník, a mountain in the Czech Republic and Poland
- Králický Sněžník Mountains, a mountain range in the Czech Republic and Poland
- Snežnik, the highest peak of the Dinaric Alps in Slovenia
- Snežnik Castle, in Slovenia
- Snezhnika, a glacieret in the Pirin Mountains of Bulgaria
