= Red Eagle =

Red Eagle may refer to:

== People ==
- Jay Red Eagle, Cherokee flutist
- William Weatherford (1781–1824), Creek Indian known as Red Eagle
- Red Eagle, Choctaw indian who toured with Buffalo Bill

== Places in Montana, United States ==
- Red Eagle Mountain
- Red Eagle Lake
- Red Eagle Glacier

== Ships ==
- MV Red Eagle (1945), a coaster which sank in Singapore in 1975
- MV Red Eagle (1996), a car ferry operated by Red Funnel between the Isle of Wight and the British mainland

== Military ==
- 4th Infantry Division (India), an Indian Army unit known as the Red Eagle Division
- 4477th Tactical Evaluation Squadron, a United States Air Force squadron known as the Red Eagles
- Operation Red Eagle, a 2007 Iraq War coalition counterinsurgency operation
- Red Eagle Brigade, the armed wing of the Communist PFLP, renamed the Abu Ali Mustafa Brigades in 2004

== Sports teams ==
- Timrå IK, a Swedish top-division hockey team known as the Red Eagles
- Red Eagle FC, a Cambodian top-division football team
- Rojos del Águila de Veracruz (Veracruz Red Eagles), a Mexican League AAA-level team

== Film and television ==
- The Red Eagle, a 2010 Thai film
- The English title of Águila Roja, a Spanish adventure television series

== Other uses ==
- Red Eagle Formation, a geologic formation of limestone and shale in Kansas and Oklahoma
- Order of the Red Eagle, a Prussian chivalric order
