= Logan Glacier =

Logan Glacier may refer to the following glaciers in United States:

- Logan Glacier (Alaska), in the U.S. state of Alaska and the territory of Yukon, Canada
- Logan Glacier (Montana), in Glacier National Park, Montana
