= Cathedral Peak (Montana) =

Mountain in the state of Montana

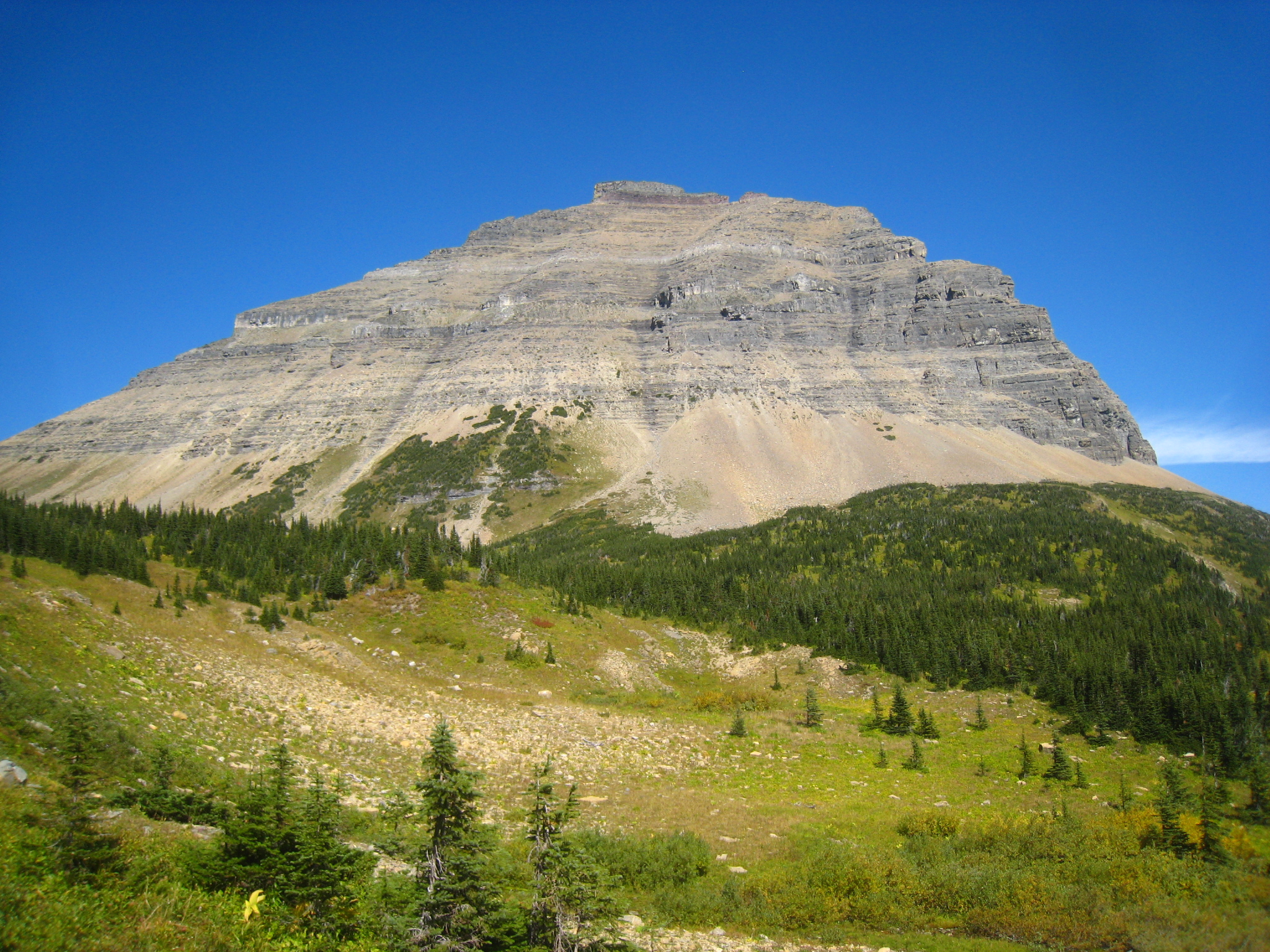
- Cathedral Peak summit

Highest point
- Elevation: 9,045 ft (2,757 m). NAVD 88
- Prominence: 1,481 ft (451 m)
- Coordinates: 48°52′8″N 113°51′58″W

Geography
- Location within Montana Location within the United States
- Location: Glacier County, Montana, U.S.
- Parent range: Lewis Range
- Topo map: USGS Ahern Pass

Climbing
- First ascent: Unknown
- Easiest route: Scramble

Cathedral Peak (9,045 feet (2,757 m)) is located in the Lewis Range, Glacier National Park in the U.S. state of Montana. Shepard Glacier is situated immediately southeast of the peak.

== See also ==
- Mountains and mountain ranges of Glacier National Park (U.S.)

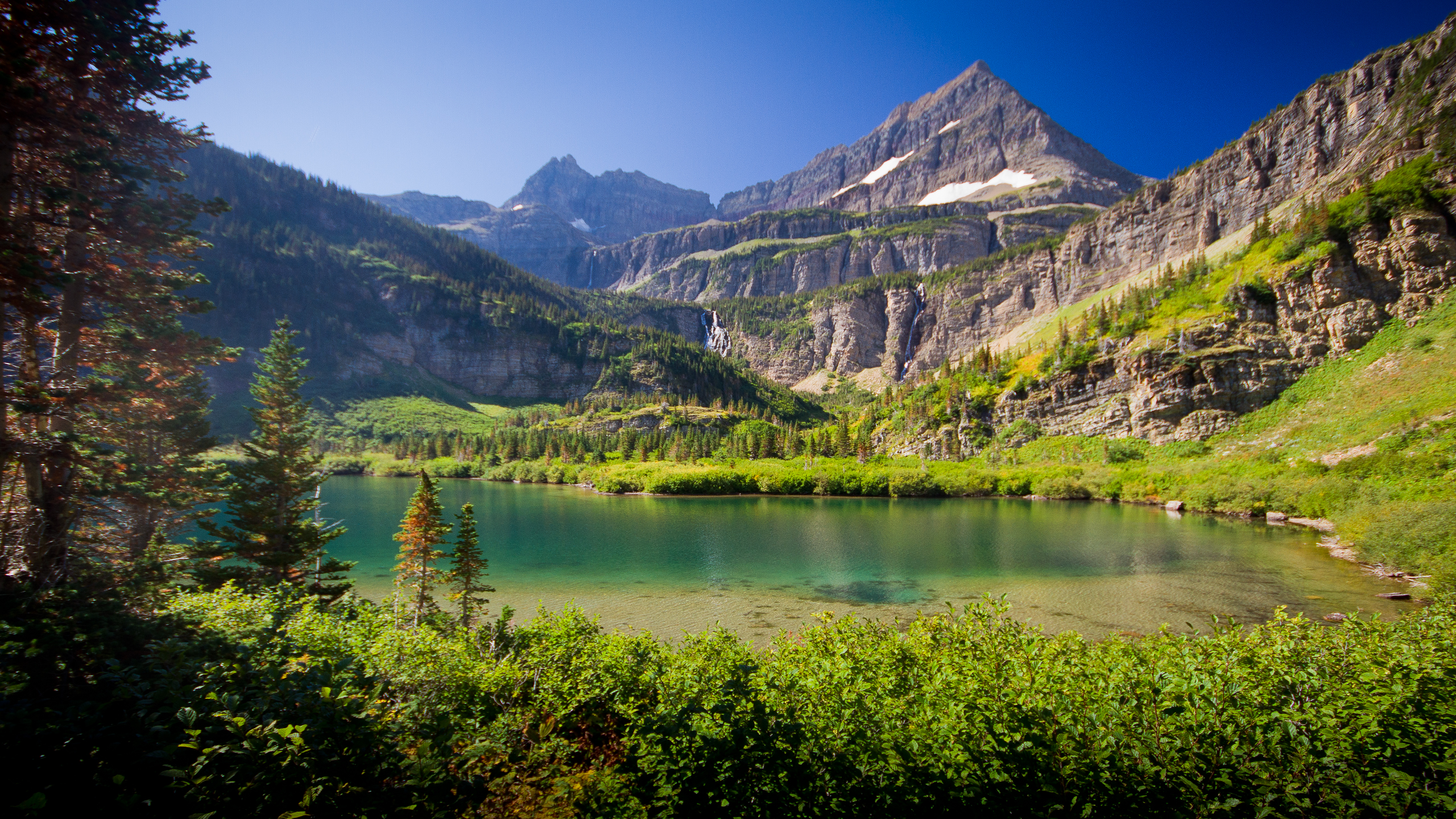
Cathedral Peak with Atsina Lake
