= Debeli Namet =

Glacier

- Location within Montenegro Location within Europe
- Interactive map of Debeli Namet
- Location: Durmitor massif, Montenegro
- Coordinates: 43°06′54″N 19°04′03″E

Debeli Namet is a small glacier below Mount Šljeme (2,455 metres (8,054 ft)) in the Durmitor massif, Montenegro.

== Geography ==
This glacier exists well below the true snowline and is sustained by avalanching snow. Results of recent investigations on the Debeli Namet glacier have been published by a British scientist (Hughes 2007). The Debeli Namet glacier is not quite the southernmost glacier in Europe, as this status currently goes to the Snezhnika glacier (latitude of 41°46′09″ N) followed by Banski Suhodol Glacier also in Pirin mountain in Bulgaria and the Calderone Glacier in Italy.

== Geography and Glaciology ==
Debeli Namet is a small glacier situated in a northeast-facing cirque beneath Mount Šljeme (2,455 meters) within the Durmitor massif of Montenegro. Positioned between approximately 2,030 and 2,170 meters above sea level, it lies significantly below the regional climatic snowline, which is estimated at around 2,700 meters in the western Balkans. The glacier's persistence is attributed to favorable microclimatic conditions, including substantial snow accumulation from avalanches and wind-drifted snow, as well as topographic shading within the cirque. These factors enable Debeli Namet to maintain its mass despite being at a relatively low altitude for a glacier at this latitude. Notably, Debeli Namet is one of the southernmost glaciers in Europe, surpassed only by glaciers such as Snezhnika in Bulgaria and the Calderone Glacier in Italy. Glaciological studies have monitored Debeli Namet's behavior over recent decades. Between 1954 and 2010, the glacier's area fluctuated between approximately 0.022 and 0.037 square kilometers. Despite regional temperature increases, the glacier has exhibited a relatively stable mass balance, with variations in size primarily influenced by annual snowfall and summer temperatures. Research indicates that the glacier's resilience is due to its specific topographic and climatic setting, which buffers it against short-term climatic fluctuations.
