= Shepard Glacier =

Glacier in Montana, United States

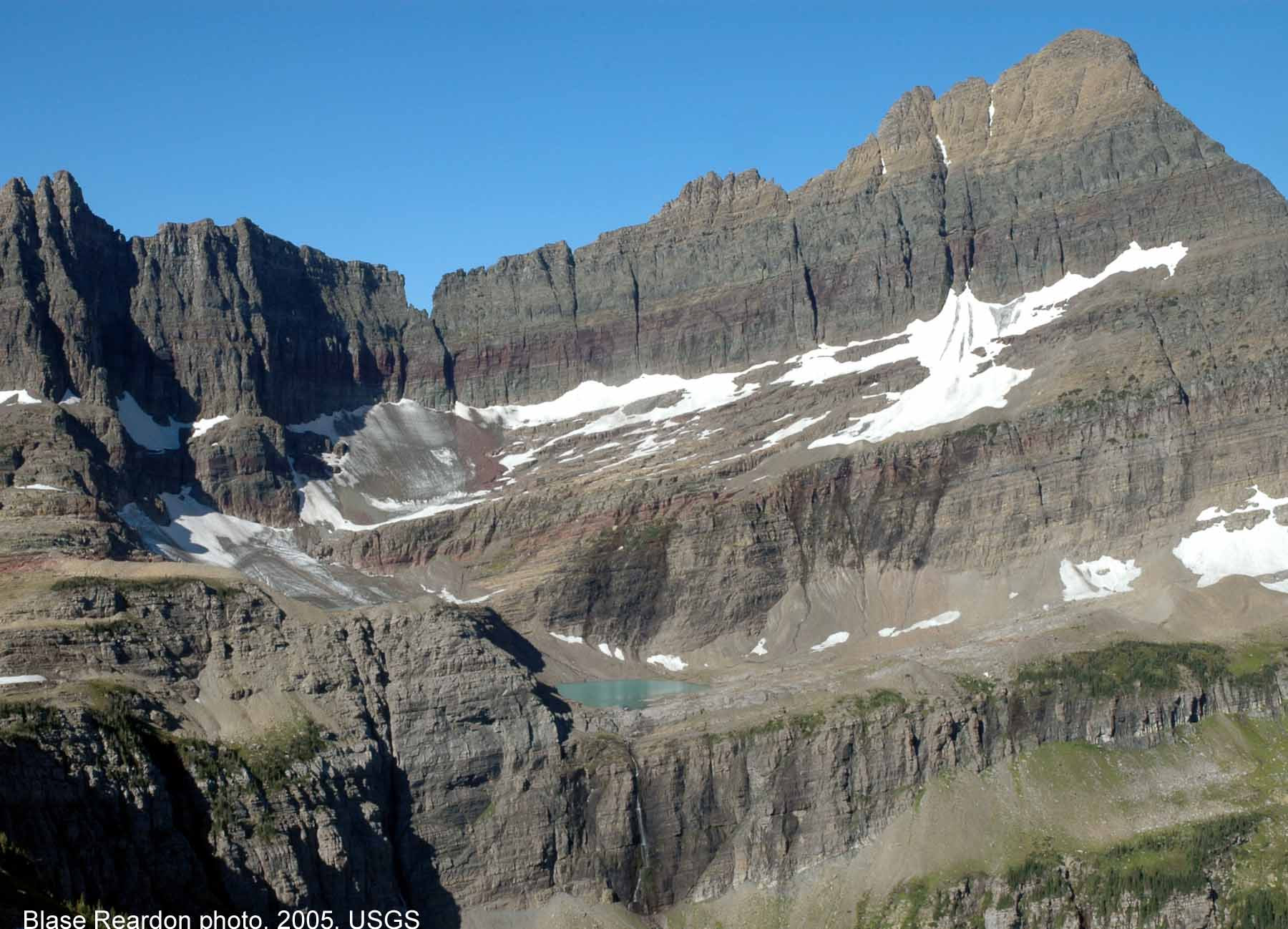
- Shepard Glacier as photographed in 2005

- Location within Montana
- Type: Glacieret
- Location: Glacier National Park, Glacier County, Montana, U.S.
- Coordinates: 48°51′56″N 113°51′32″W
- Area: Less than 25 acres (0.10 km^{2}) in 2009
- Terminus: Talus
- Status: Retreating

Shepard Glacier is a glacier remnant (glacieret) In Glacier National Park in the U.S. state of Montana. The glacieret is immediately southeast of Cathedral Peak. Shepard Glacier was one of a number of glaciers that have been documented by the United States Geological Service (USGS) to have retreated significantly in Glacier National Park. Shepard Glacier was measured in 2009 to have decreased to less than 25 acres (0.10 km^{2}), considered to be a minimal size to qualify as being considered an active glacier. Between 1966 and 2005, Shepard Glacier lost 56 percent of its surface area.

Comparing the 2005 image at right to the one below taken in 1913, it is apparent that Shepard glacier has retreated significantly between these dates.

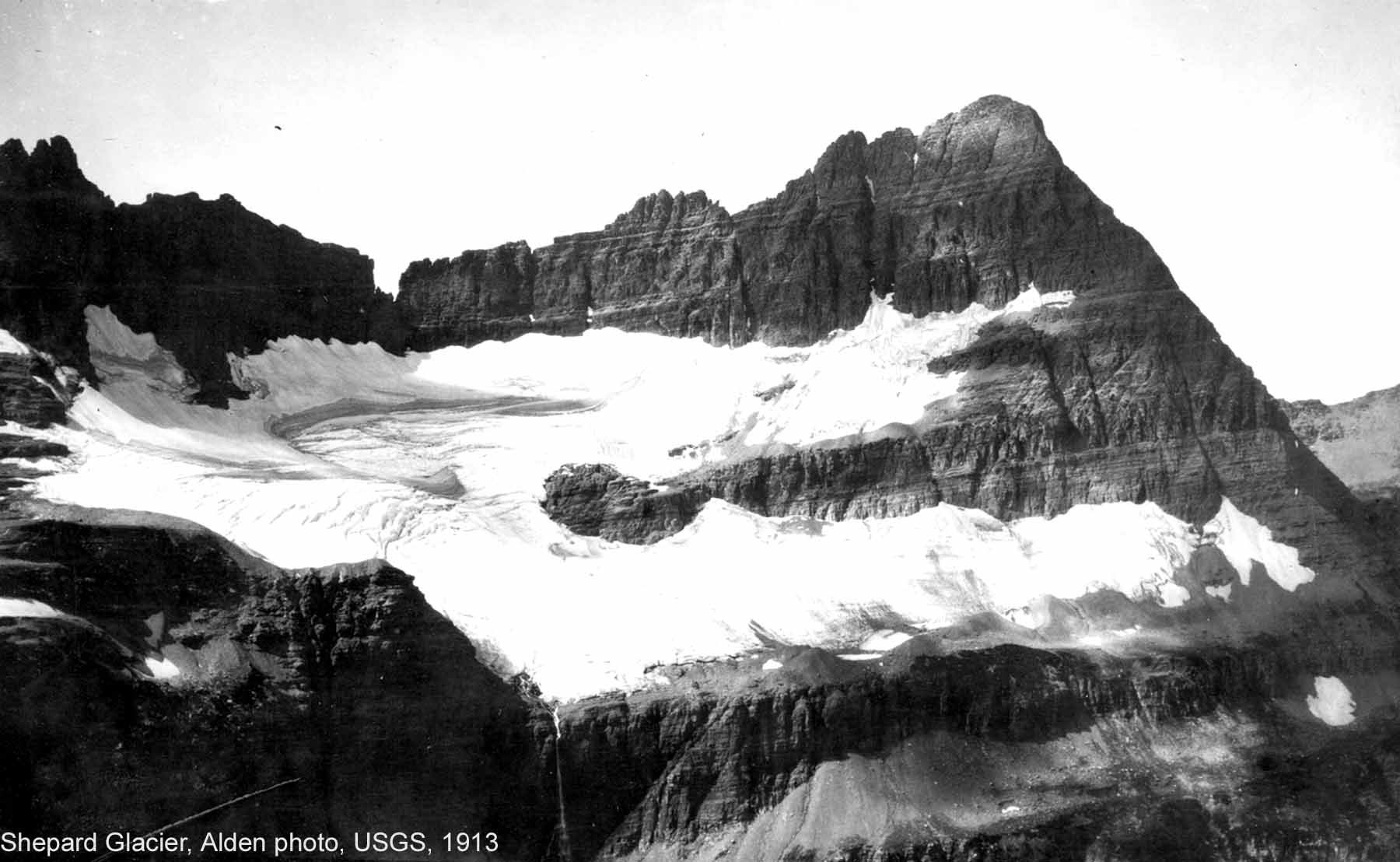
Shepard Glacier as photographed in 1913

== See also ==
- List of glaciers in the United States
- Glaciers in Glacier National Park (U.S.)
