= Calderone glacier =

Glacier in the Apennine Mountains, Abruzzo, Italy

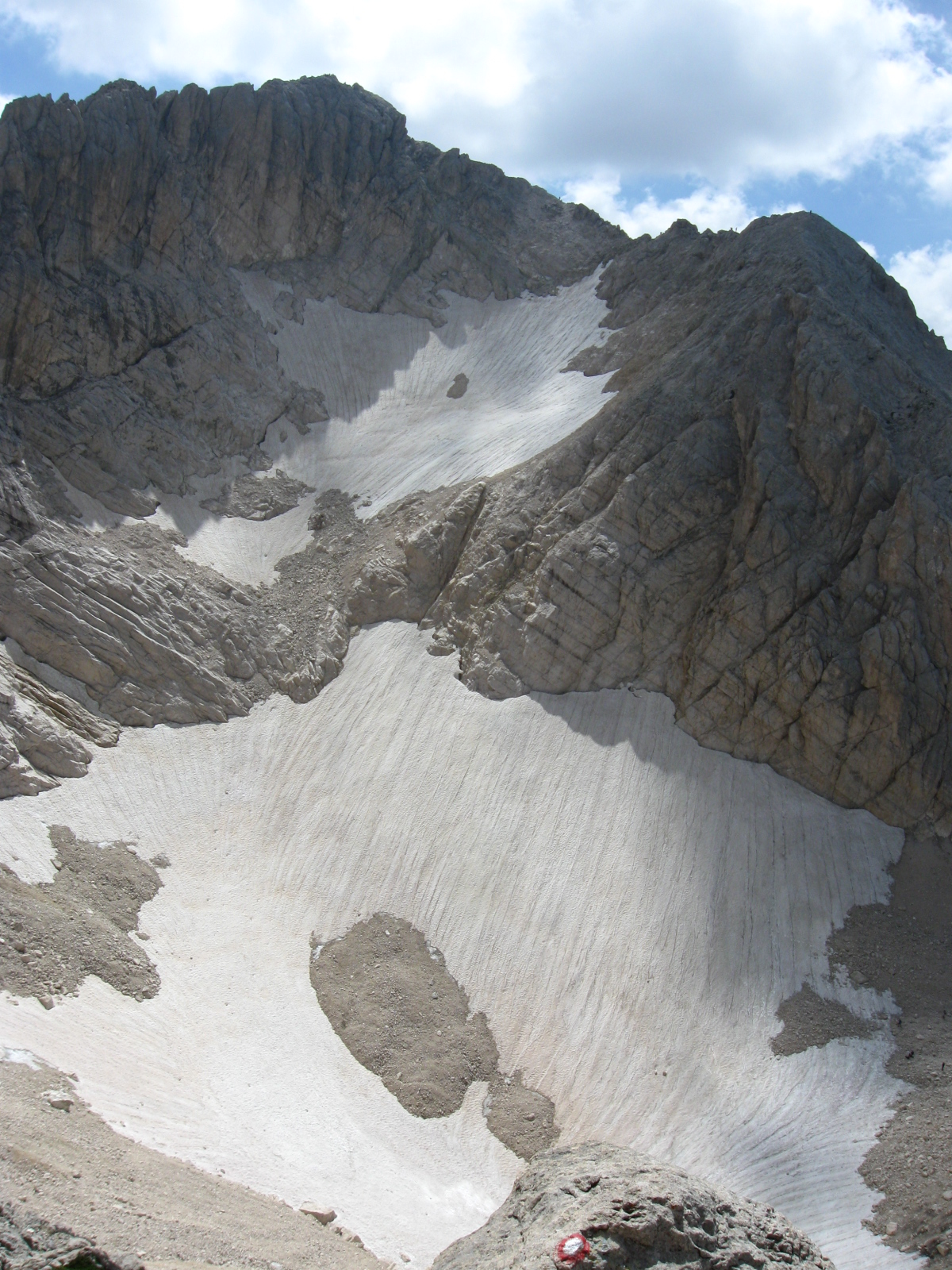
- The fragmented Calderone glacier in 2013. The visible trim line on the enclosing cirque cliffs marks the most recent highest extent of the glacier.

- Location within Italy
- Interactive map of Calderone glacier
- Location: Northern slopes of Mt. Corno Grande.
- Coordinates: 42°28′N 13°33′E

The Calderone glacier (Italian: Ghiacciaio del Calderone) was a historical mountain glacier located in the Gran Sasso d'Italia massif, in the Abruzzi Apennines, in central Italy. Following its fragmentation in 2000, the current glacial system consists of two glacierets found between 2,650 and 2,830 m a.s.l. within a cirque just beneath the summit of Mt. Corno Grande (2,912 m a.s.l.), which is the highest peak in the Apennine Mountains. With the exception of a few small multi-year snow patches, these two glacierets constitute the last perennial ice bodies still active in the entire Apennine range. In 1998, Italian glaciologists at a symposium in L'Aquila predicted that the Calderone glacier would vanish within a couple of decades, with more recent estimates indicating that the remaining glacierets could disappear entirely by 2050, if significant reductions in carbon emissions are not achieved.

After the disappearance of the Corral de la Veleta glacier (37°N, 3°W) in the Sierra Nevada Mountains, in southern Spain, in 1913, the Calderone glacier (42°28'N, 13°34'E) became one of the southernmost glacial systems in Europe, together with a few other small glaciers and glacierets located at similar latitudes. These ice bodies currently include the Snezhnika (41°46'N, 23°24'E) and Banski Suhodol (41°46'N, 23°23'E) glacierets in the Pirin Mountains, in southwestern Bulgaria; the Maja e Kolacit glacier (42°30'N, 19°55'E) in the Prokletije Mountains, in northern Albania; the Maladeta glacier (42°65'N, 0°63'E) in the Pyrenees Mountains, in northeastern Spain; and the Debeli Namet glacier (43°6'N, 19°4'E) in the Durmitor massif, in the Dinaric Alps, in northwestern Montenegro.

== Glacier evolution ==
The glaciers of the Gran Sasso d'Italia massif are believed to have reached their maximum extensions around 22,600 ^{14}C yr BP, during the Last Glacial Maximum (LGM), before starting to retreat around 21,000 yr BP. Since the start of the Holocene, the Calderone glacier experienced at least five major expansion phases that were limited to the enclosing cirque and the upper section of the glacial valley below, although the steepness of the latter may have prevented the formation of additional moraines that could have potentially highlighted further glacial advances. For comparison with previous expansion phases, the equilibrium line altitude (ELA) of the glacier during the formation of the first two moraines is estimated to have been more than 800 m (870 yd) to 1,050 m (1,150 yd) higher than the LGM level, and at least 250 m (270 yd) higher than the Younger Dryas level. The last three expansion phases instead occurred during the Little Ice Age (LIA), during which the ELA of the glacier is estimated to have never been above 2,730 m a.s.l., although still between 1,000 m (1,100 yd) and 1,050 m (1,150 yd) higher than the LGM level, indicating an increasingly warmer local climate. Most notably, the development of soil inside the Calderone cirque around 3,900 yr BP, between the second and third expansion phases, suggests that at the time either the glacier had disappeared completely or it was reduced to a very small ice body covered by a very thick debris layer. On the other hand, during its last major expansion phase, the glacier reached its maximum extension of the last 4,000 years, with its terminus protruding beyond the morphological boundaries of the cirque.

=== Post-LIA reduction trend ===
And since many hunters go to shoot chamois with the arquebuses on said mount, they go to the foot or hike rather high up on the mount. All those who have not been on the summit say that there is a fountain at the top. I say that no fountain is there, but that there is indeed a large valley between the Mount of Saint Niccola and the Mount Corno, where always there is snow fifteen or twenty feet high, and more than any place where snow and ice lie perpetually. And this is a quantity of a large mile in length, and more than half a mile in width, of which always little or much is lost, and that water flows down different precipices, which then create very rare springs at the foot of the mountain, where the three mounts are.
Note. Excerpt translated from the first-hand account of the first ascent to the summit of Mt. Corno Grande by Bolognese alpinist and engineer Francesco De Marchi on 19 August 1573, which provides the earliest description of the Calderone glacier.

Even though the oldest surviving account of the Calderone glacier dates back to the first ascent to the summit of Mt. Corno Grande on 19 August 1573, followed by several other observations particularly during the 19th century, its glacial nature was not clearly established until its first direct study in September 1916. During the 19th century, the Calderone glacier did not significantly change in size with respect to its maximum extension during the LIA, with a surface area reported equal to about 10 ha (0.10 km^{2}; 0.04 mi^{2}), and the maximum thickness estimated roughly between 80 m (87 yd) and 100 m (110 yd). A significant serac zone was also reportedly active until the end of the century, based on the oldest available photographs from 1871 and 1887, as well as morpho-chronological reconstructions. In 1916, the glacier instead had an estimated surface area roughly equal to 7 ha (0.07 km^{2}; 0.03 mi^{2}), and it was still leaning against the frontal moraine, with compact ice observed in the lower section, snow cover in the middle-to-upper section, and a few visible crevasses in the upper section; although it was already noticeably smaller with respect to the previous century. In fact, while the glacier still showed signs of ice flow when it was first added to the Italian Glaciers Inventory in 1925, including several crevasses and a small serac zone, by that time its right flank had significantly retreated from the walls of the enclosing cirque.

After the end of the LIA around 1850, the Calderone glacier entered the current general reduction trend, although significant temporary expansion periods still occurred during the 20th century, namely in the years 1916–1920, 1957–1961, and 1975–1980. Other studies similarly highlight three periods of lower temperatures and higher precipitations, roughly corresponding to the second half of the 1930s, the late 1950s – early 1960s, and the second half of the 1970s, based on meteorological data from Isola del Gran Sasso d'Italia (420 m a.s.l.), located about 8 km (5.0 mi) east-northeast from the glacier. During these periods, the glacier ice was almost always covered by residual snow and firn at the end of the ablation season, indicating generally positive mass balances. Nevertheless, most other periods were characterized by either higher temperatures or lower precipitations, which resulted in negative mass balances throughout the later part of the 20th century, with the most impactful reduction periods having occurred in the years 1942–1949 and 1981–2004.

Systematic observations of the Calderone glacier started in 1934, when its surface area was estimated equal to about 6 ha (0.06 km^{2}; 0.02 mi^{2}); and no significant changes were observed during the 1930s, as extraordinarily abundant accumulation seasons were subsequently cancelled out by particularly torrid ablation seasons. Nevertheless, after the exceptional winter accumulation of 1940, the glacier entered a marked reduction phase, during which it became more and more common for the snow accumulation to be concentrated in the frontal section, while the presence of the now-disappeared supraglacial Lake Sofia became increasingly more significant. In fact, even though the evolution from the previous stable glacier stage to the current surviving glacier stage was a gradual process that roughly spanned from the 1930s to the 1950s, the watershed moment has been placed at around 1940. During the 1950s, with further alternations between snowy winters and hot summers, the glacier continued to shrink ever more noticeably within the cirque, while also starting to be visibly covered by rocky debris. In the early 1960s, the situation remained more or less stationary, before an abrupt loss in 1964 of all the ice that accumulated between 1958 and 1963. Conversely, in the late 1970s, a significant snow accumulation was reported, which temporarily returned the left flank of the glacier to the levels reached in the 1950s, even though the right flank still remained below the levels of 1960. Starting from the 1980s, the glacier entered its present phase of consistent reduction while also becoming over time a debris-covered glacier, with its surface almost consistently appearing devoid of snow from 1983 onward, except for a few good snowy winters. For instance, the significant snow accumulation reported in 1994 completely melted during the following summer.

=== Local conditions ===
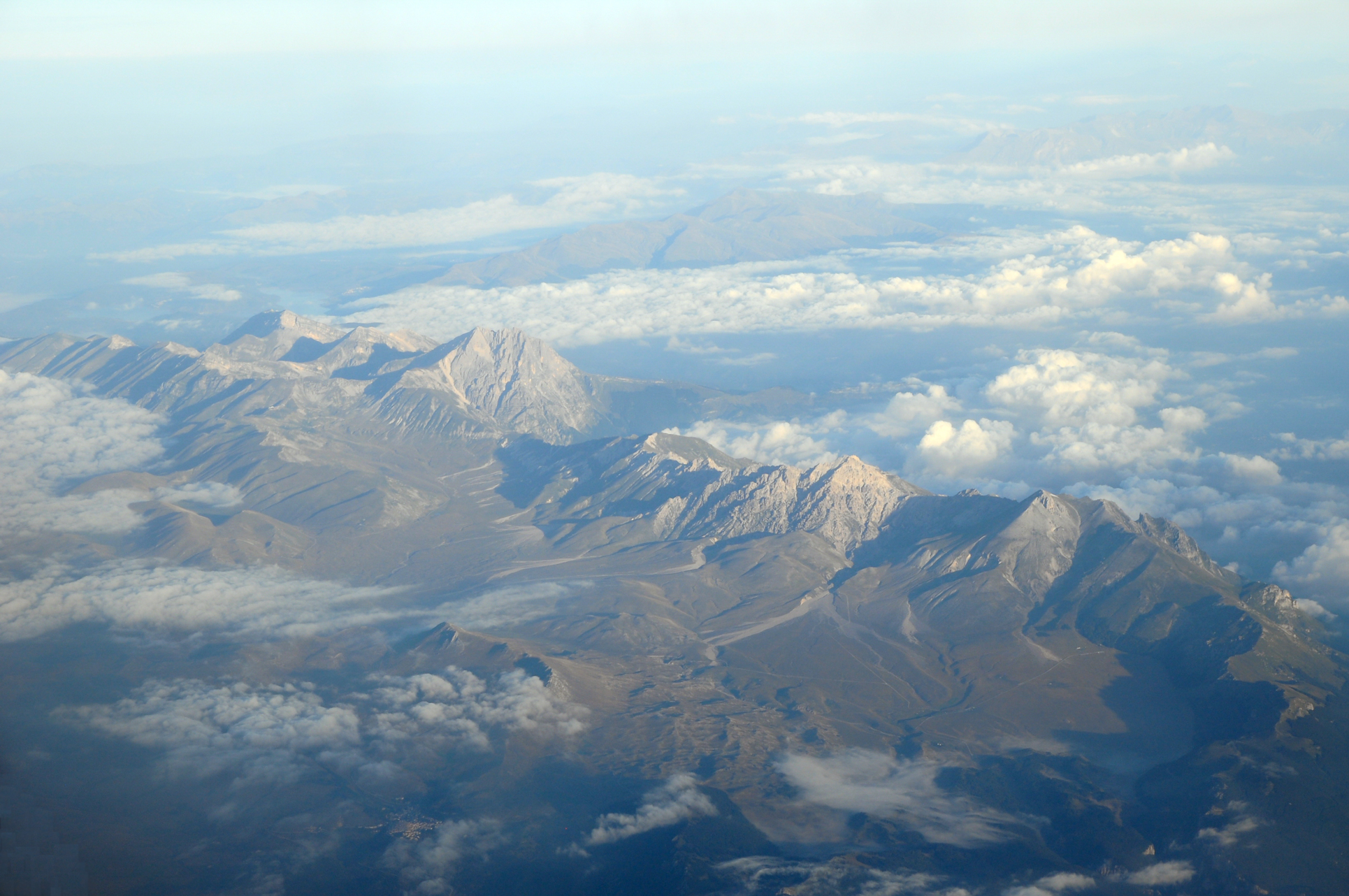
Northwest-looking aerial view of the Gran Sasso d'Italia massif and the Central Apennines, with Mt. Corno Grande reaching the highest point in the entire Apennine range.

The noticeable variability in the evolution of the Calderone glacier is mainly due to the particular local weather patterns, combined with its favorable position, which contribute to its endurance. For instance, despite the current warming trend and the relatively lower latitudes of the Central Apennines, it is still not uncommon to measure winter temperatures as low as −25 °C (−13 °F) in these mountain regions. Moreover, the northeastern orientation of the Calderone cirque, combined with the significant elevation of the enclosing mountain ridges, further reduces the exposure of the glacier to solar radiation, while also leaving it open to the humid north-east winds from the Adriatic Sea, about 45 km (28 mi) away, thus resulting in abundant winter precipitations. Besides wind-driven deposition phenomena, a significant source of indirect accumulation for the glacier is provided by the frequent snow avalanches from the overlooking steep mountain sides. Other factors that favor the permanence of the deposited snow include the calcareous bedrock allowing the drainage of meltwater; a 1,400 m (1,500 yd) tall cliff (known as il Paretone) on the northeastern side of Mt. Corno Grande causing the daily formation of orographic clouds during the hottest summer hours; the lack of barriers to winds from the Adriatic Sea leading to the buildup of stau phenomena; the lower average summer temperatures on the eastern side of the Gran Sasso d'Italia massif caused by cooler north-west air streams; and the general Mediterranean climate focusing precipitations during the fall-winter semester. In addition, thermal inversion phenomena can also develop during periods of stable high pressure within the various basins and valleys of the massif, such as the Calderone cirque, which allow the accumulated snow to last longer.

On the other hand, limiting factors include the generally lower precipitations on the Adriatic side of the massif compared to the Tyrrhenian side, for equal altitudes; elevated winds from chimney effects potentially disrupting the snow accumulation; the limited number of downwind accumulation spots across the glacier; the large frontal moraine intercepting most of the snow from the northern sectors; the overall exposure of the eastern and northeastern parts of the accumulation basin to solar radiation; a low local thermal gradient of about 0.5 °C (0.9 °F) per 100 m (110 yd); and the typically hot and dry summers of the Mediterranean climate. Historically, an additional limiting factor was the lower height of the overlooking cliffs during the periods of maximum glacier expansion. For instance, during the LIA climax of the 19th century, the cliffs rose no more than 50 m (55 yd) above the glacier surface, which resulted in a less effective indirect accumulation.

=== Glacier fragmentation ===
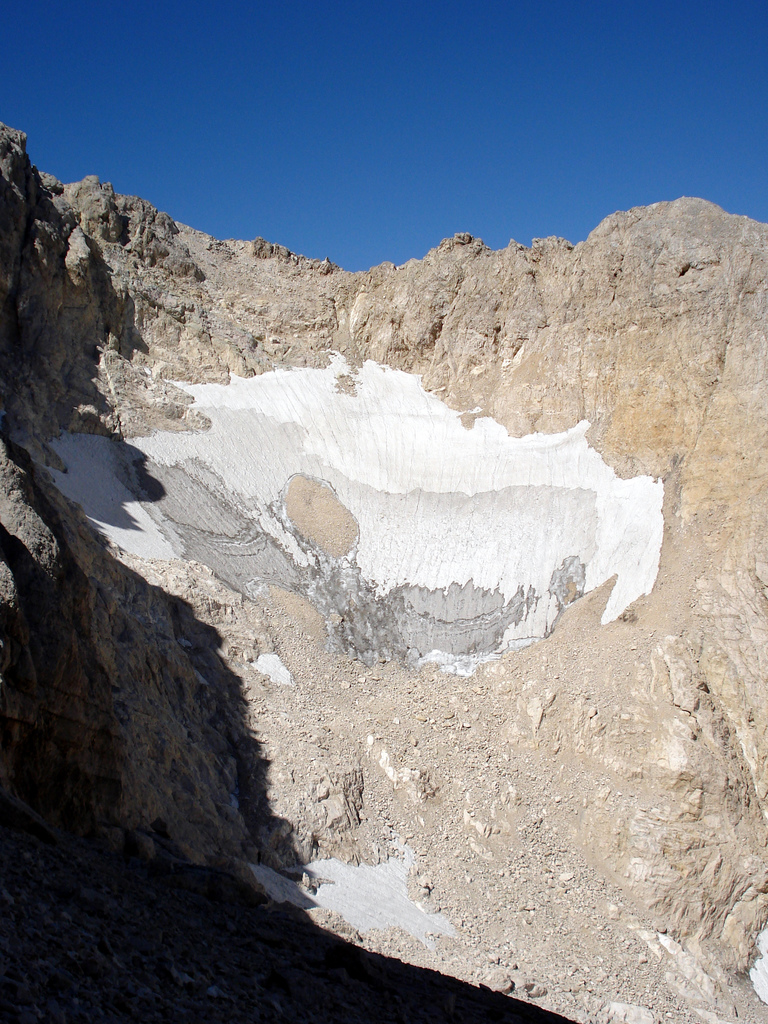
The Upper Calderone glacieret in 2007.

During the 1990s, the surface area of the Calderone glacier was estimated roughly equal to 5 ha (0.05 km^{2}; 0.02 mi^{2}) although, by the turn of the century, it was almost completely concealed by rocky debris, thus making the identification of its boundaries more difficult. On the other hand, the sustained accumulation of rockfalls effectively created a protective layer that helped maintain the buried ice, especially in the lower section of the glacier. Nevertheless, the theoretical ELA is currently believed to be well above the summit of Mt. Corno Grande, thus leaving the entire glacier within the ablation zone. As a consequence of its continued melting, the Calderone glacier eventually fragmented in the summer of 2000 into the current Lower and Upper Calderone glacierets, while exposing the roche moutonnée landform between them. The Lower glacieret is completely buried under a surface debris layer ranging between 5 cm (2.0 in) and 1.5 m (4.9 ft) in thickness, and located at the bottom of the Calderone cirque; while the Upper glacieret consists mostly of ice and firn found in the uppermost part of the cirque, with little debris cover. Both glacial bodies lack any morphological evidence of glacier dynamics, with the last visible crevasses having been reported back in 1994.

From 2000 to 2006, the Lower glacieret experienced an almost constant reduction in thickness, with the exception of the positive mass balances reported in 2004 and 2006; while the Upper glacieret registered an almost constant positive trend, with the exception of the negative mass balance reported in 2002. Most notably, the local area reported on average both a slight decrease in summer temperatures during the ten years after 1995, and a slight increase in the total winter snowfalls in the eight years after 1995, with respect to the preceding ten years, based on meteorological data from Pietracamela (1,000 m a.s.l.), located about 6 km (3.7 mi) north from the glacier. Nevertheless, the combined surface area of the two glacierets had shrunk to about 3.6 ha (0.04 km^{2}; 0.01 mi^{2}) by 2006, down from the 9.09 ha (0.09 km^{2}; 0.04 mi^{2}) covered by the Calderone glacier in 1884.

In March 2022, a joint survey by CNR-ISP, INGV, the Ca' Foscari University of Venice, and the University of Padua found approximately 25 m (27 yd) of ice remaining, largely concealed beneath rocky debris. A subsequent drilling campaign recovered the first ice core from the Lower Calderone glacieret, reaching the bedrock at a depth of 27.2 m (29.7 yd), with the samples being preserved in Antarctica under the UNESCO-recognized Ice Memory program.

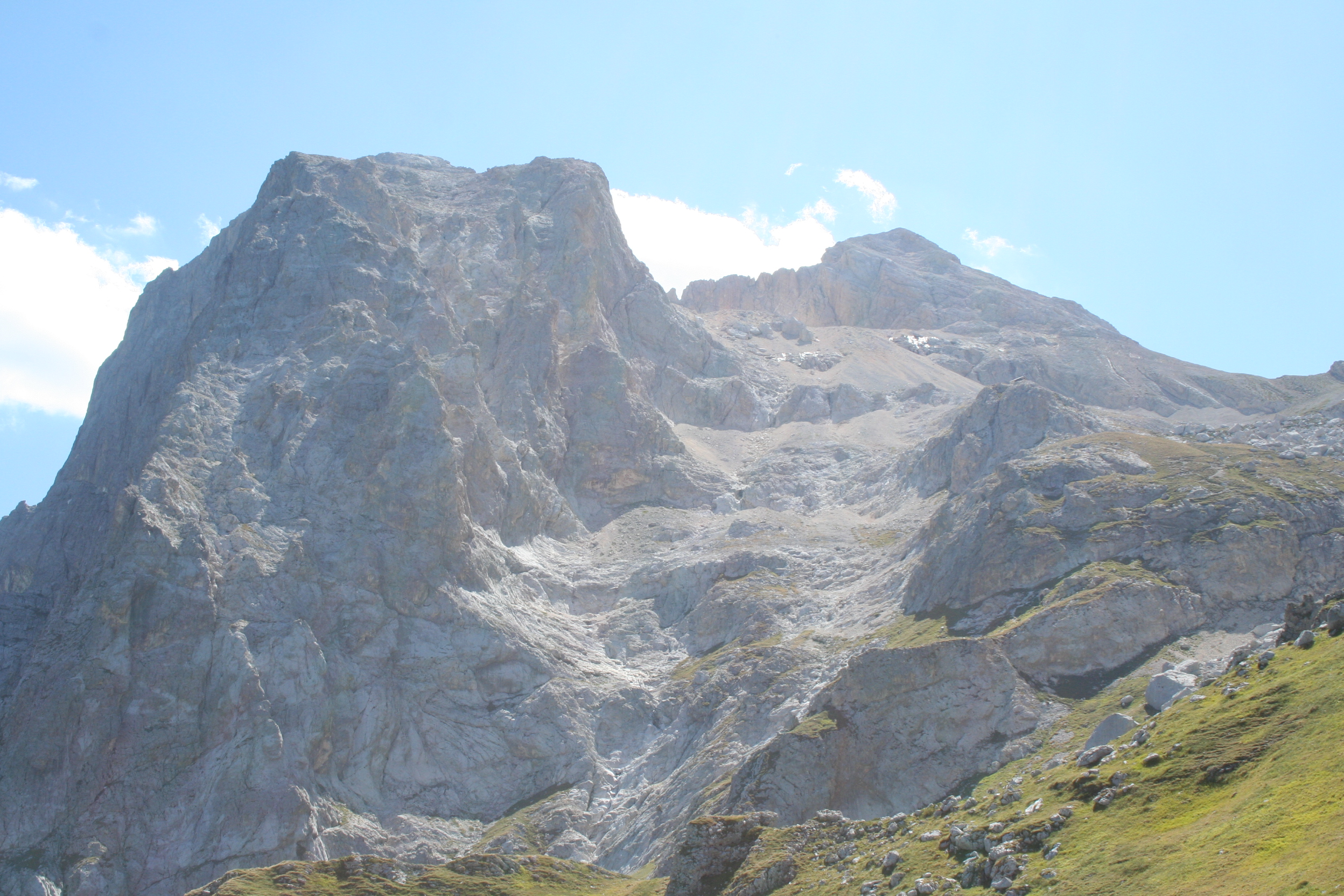
Vallone delle Cornacchie, the glacial valley beneath the Calderone cirque, on the northern side of Mt. Corno Grande.

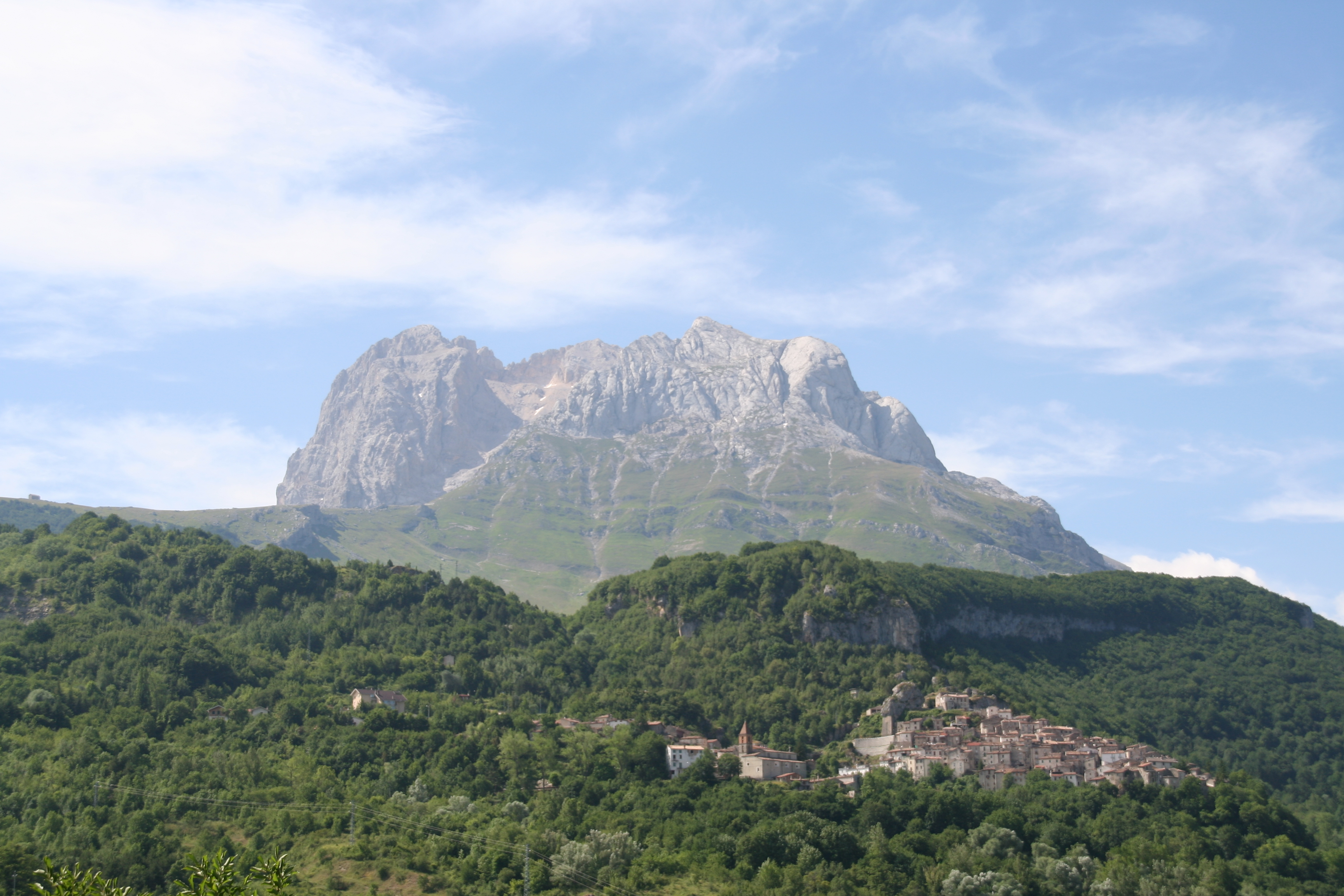
South-looking view of the Gran Sasso d'Italia massif, with the town of Pietracamela visible in the foreground.

Temporal evolution of the Calderone glacier (Note: After the year 2000, the estimates are divided between the Upper (first row) and Lower (second row) Calderone glacierets.)
Year	Surface area [m^{2}]	Volume [m^{3}]	Average thickness (Note: Straightforwardly derived from the surface area and volume estimates, the parameter does not account for the highly irregular topography of the Calderone cirque, which may require different estimates for different sections of the glacier for a better comparison over time.) [m]	Refs.
1794	104,257	4,332,207	41.6	
1884	90,886	3,382,166	37.2	
1916	63,335	3,386,485	53.5	
1917	70,000	–	–	
1934	59,713	2,461,529	41.2	
1954	68,501	–	–	
1960	60,030	1,729,934	28.8	
1966	45,000	–	–	
1982	62,151	–	–	
1990	45,000	360,931	8.0	
1992	70,000	–	–	
1994	–	120,000 (Note: The outlying value most likely reflects the difficulty in accurately estimating the glacier volume, rather than indicating an actual sudden collapse and subsequent rebound.)	–	
1995	62,000	–	–	
1998	50,000	–	–	
1999	52,000	–	–	
2005	–	–	–	
2005	32,900 (Note: Possibly a combined estimate.)	–	–	
2006	9,000	–	–	
2006	27,000	–	–	
2008	–	–	–	
2008	35,545	–	–	
2011	10,000	–	–	
2011	30,000	–	–	
2016	–	–	–	
2016	27,100	315,000	11.6	

== See also ==
- Gran Sasso and Monti della Laga National Park
