= Clyde Peak =

Mountain in Montana, United States

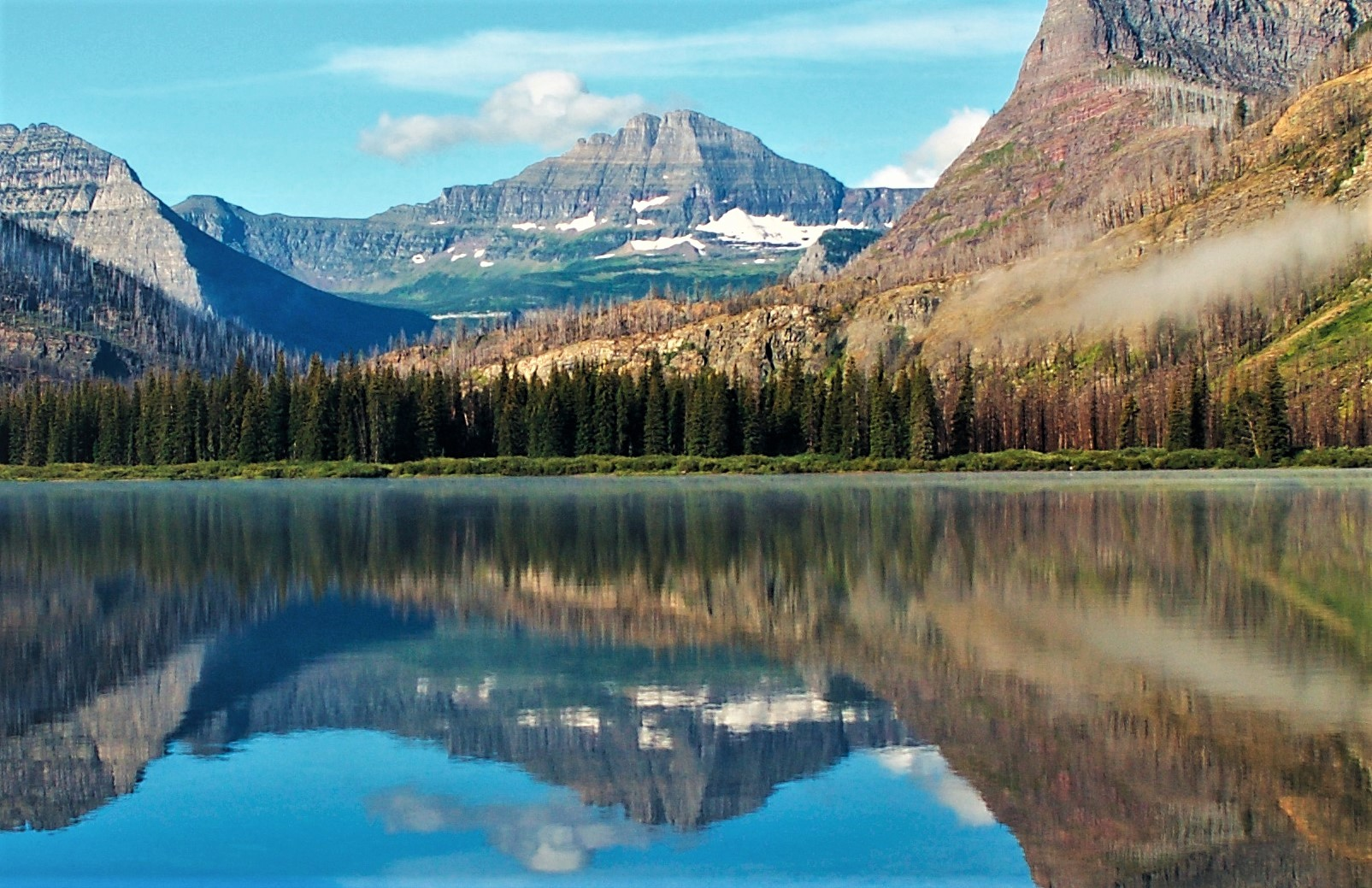
- Northeast aspect, reflected in Red Eagle Lake

Highest point
- Elevation: 8,610 ft (2,624 m)
- Prominence: 770 ft (235 m)
- Parent peak: Mount Logan (9,244 ft)
- Isolation: 1.44 mi (2.32 km)
- Coordinates: 48°35′17″N 113°37′02″W

Naming
- Etymology: Norman Clyde

Geography
- Location within Montana Location within the United States
- Location: Glacier National Park; Flathead County / Glacier County; Montana, U.S.
- Parent range: Lewis Range; Rocky Mountains
- Topo map: USGS Mount Stimson

Climbing
- First ascent: 1923
- Easiest route: class 3 scrambling

Clyde Peak is an 8,610-foot-elevation (2,620-meter) mountain summit located in Glacier National Park in the U.S. state of Montana. The mountain straddles the border shared by Flathead County and Glacier County. It is situated on the Continental Divide so precipitation runoff from the west side of the mountain drains into Thompson Creek which is part of the Middle Fork Flathead River watershed, and the east side drains into headwaters of Red Eagle Creek, which flows to Red Eagle Lake, thence Saint Mary Lake. It is set in the Lewis Range, and the nearest higher neighbor is Mount Logan 1.44 mile to the northwest. Topographic relief is significant as the southwest aspect rises approximately 4,000 feet (1,200 meters) in one mile.

== Etymology ==
The mountain's name commemorates Norman Clyde (1885–1972), who made the first ascent of this peak on July 23, 1923. Clyde is credited with 130 first ascents, most of which were in the Sierra Nevada of California. In 1923 he spent 36 days in Glacier National Park, Montana, where he climbed 36 mountains, including 11 first ascents. This geographical feature's name has not yet been officially adopted by the United States Board on Geographic Names.

== Geology ==
Like other mountains in Glacier National Park, Clyde Peak is composed of sedimentary rock laid down during the Precambrian to Jurassic periods. Formed in shallow seas, this sedimentary rock was initially uplifted beginning 170 million years ago when the Lewis Overthrust fault pushed an enormous slab of precambrian rocks 3 mi (4.8 km) thick, 50 miles (80 km) wide and 160 miles (260 km) long over younger rock of the cretaceous period.

== Climate ==
According to the Köppen climate classification system, Clyde Peak is located in an alpine subarctic climate zone with long, cold, snowy winters, and cool to warm summers. Winter temperatures can drop below −10 °F with wind chill factors below −30 °F. Due to its altitude, it receives precipitation all year, as snow in winter, and as thunderstorms in summer. This climate supports the Red Eagle Glacier remnant on the north slope of the peak.

== Gallery ==
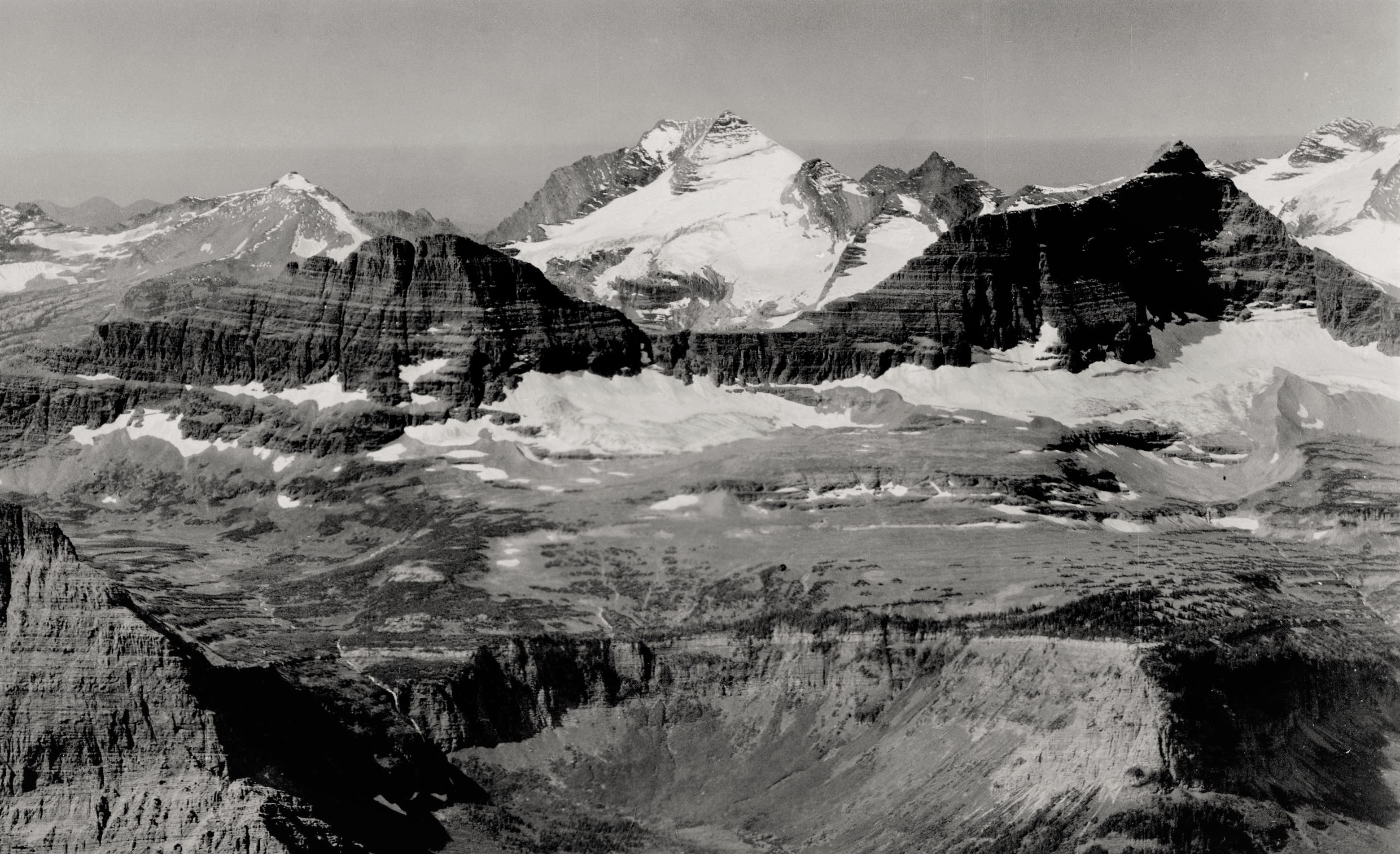
Clyde Peak (left), Blackfoot Mountain (center), Mt. Logan (right).
Aerial view from northeast, circa 1925.

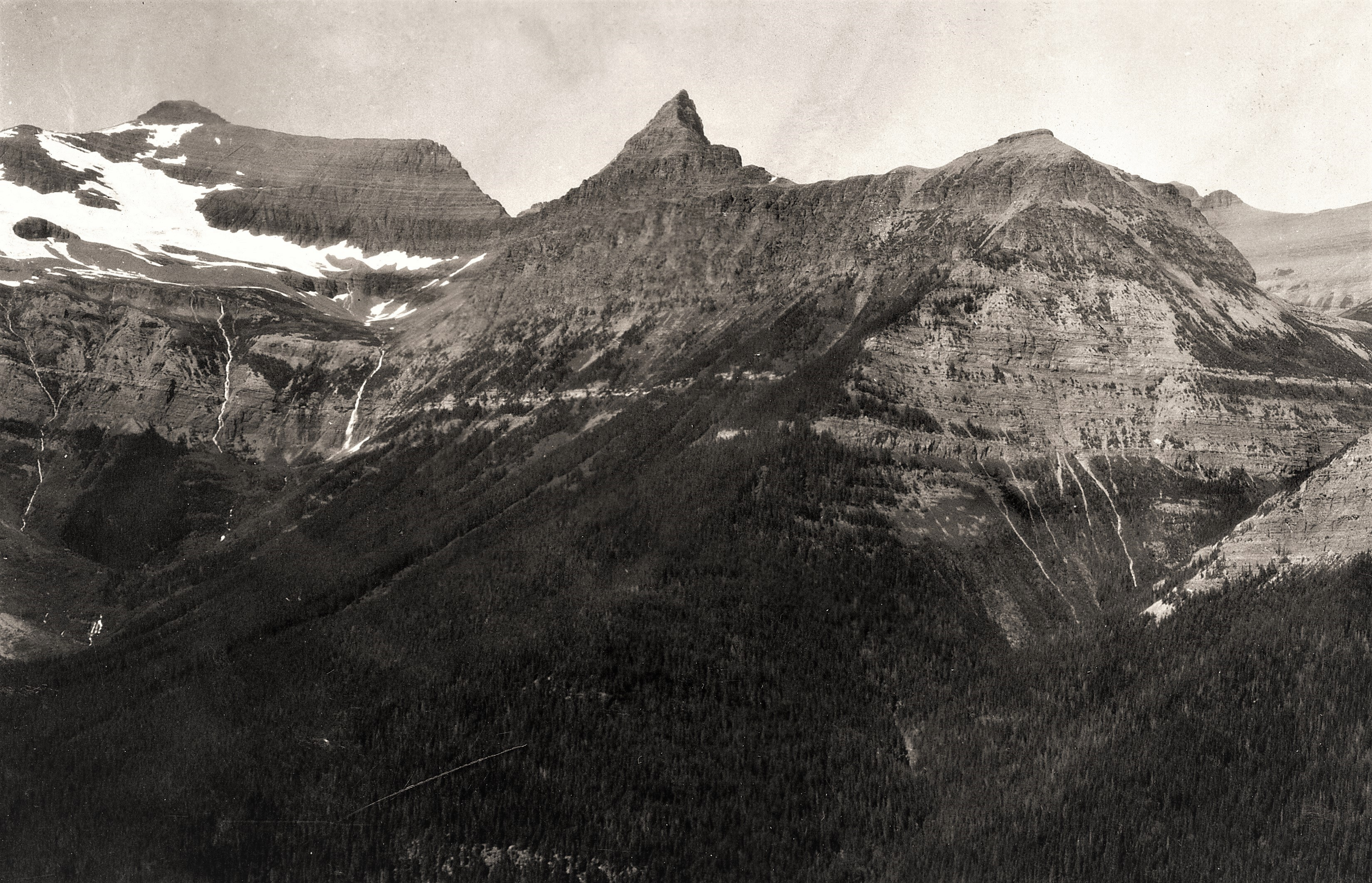
South aspect of Clyde Peak (centered), with Logan upper left. 1914

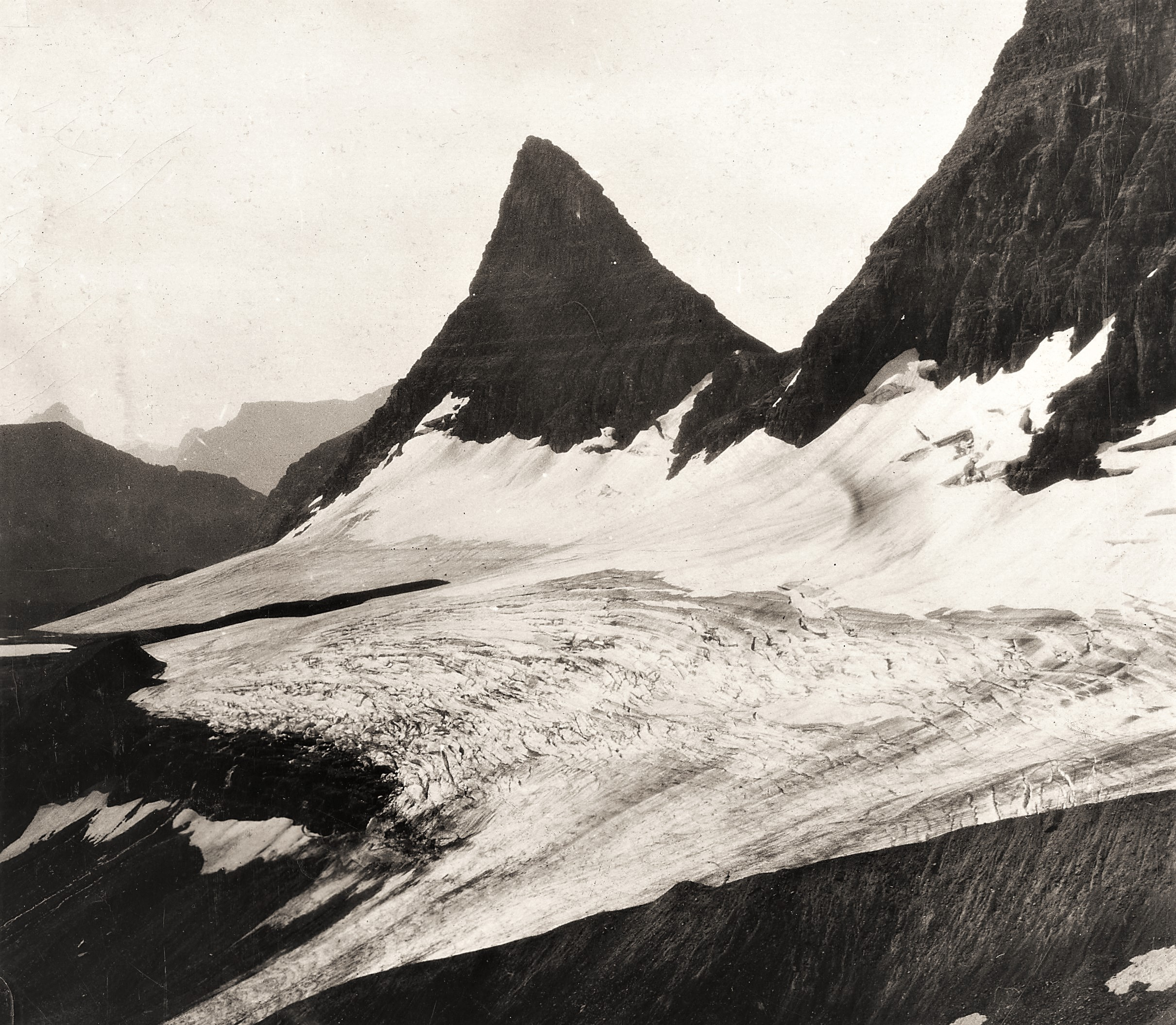
North aspect of Clyde Peak, with Logan and Red Eagle Glaciers. 1914.

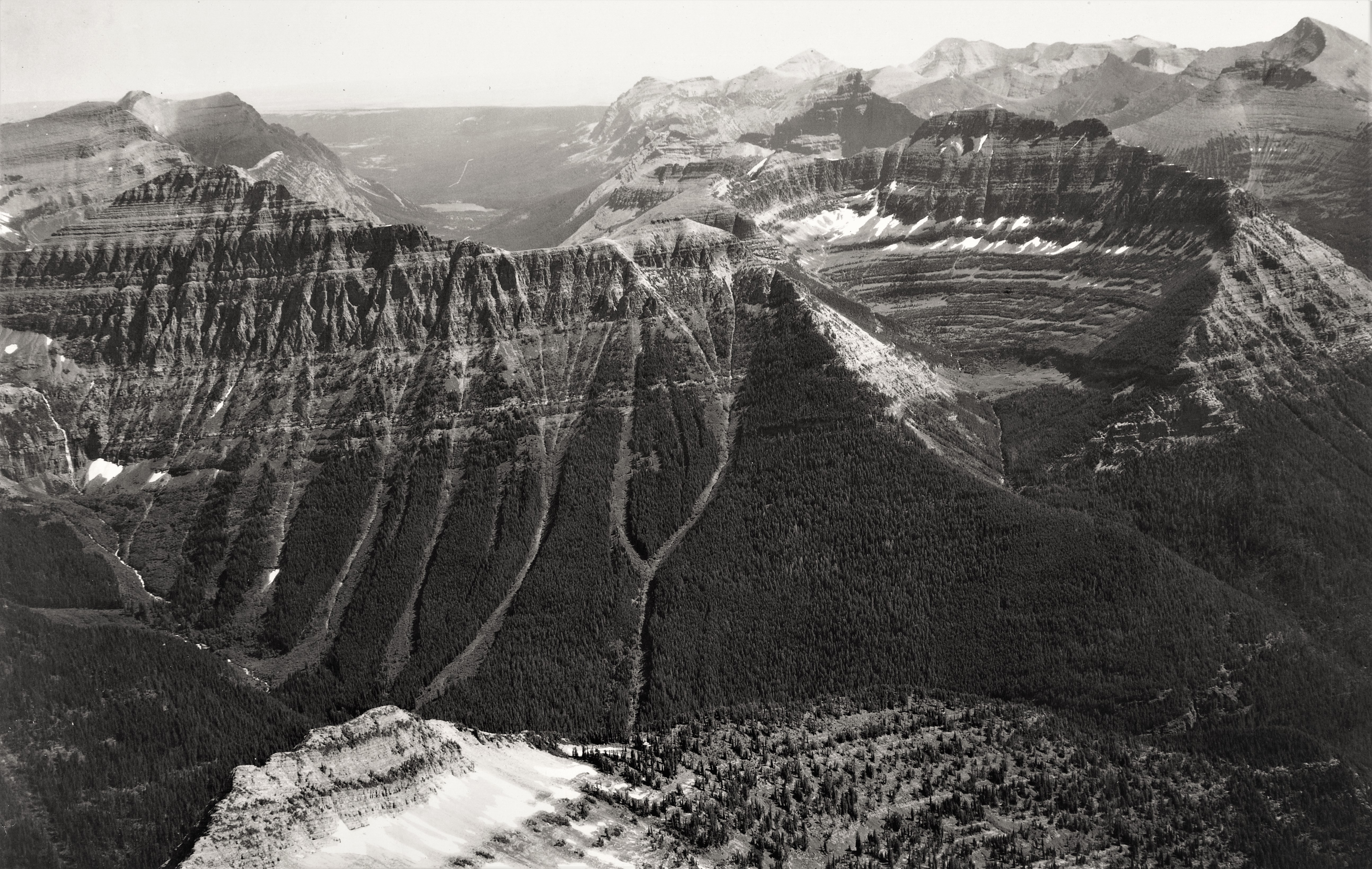
Aerial view of the west aspect of Clyde Peak (left side), circa 1930s

== See also ==
- Mountains and mountain ranges of Glacier National Park (U.S.)
- Norman Clyde Peak
