= Aneto glacier =

Glacier in Spain

- Glaciar d'Aneto
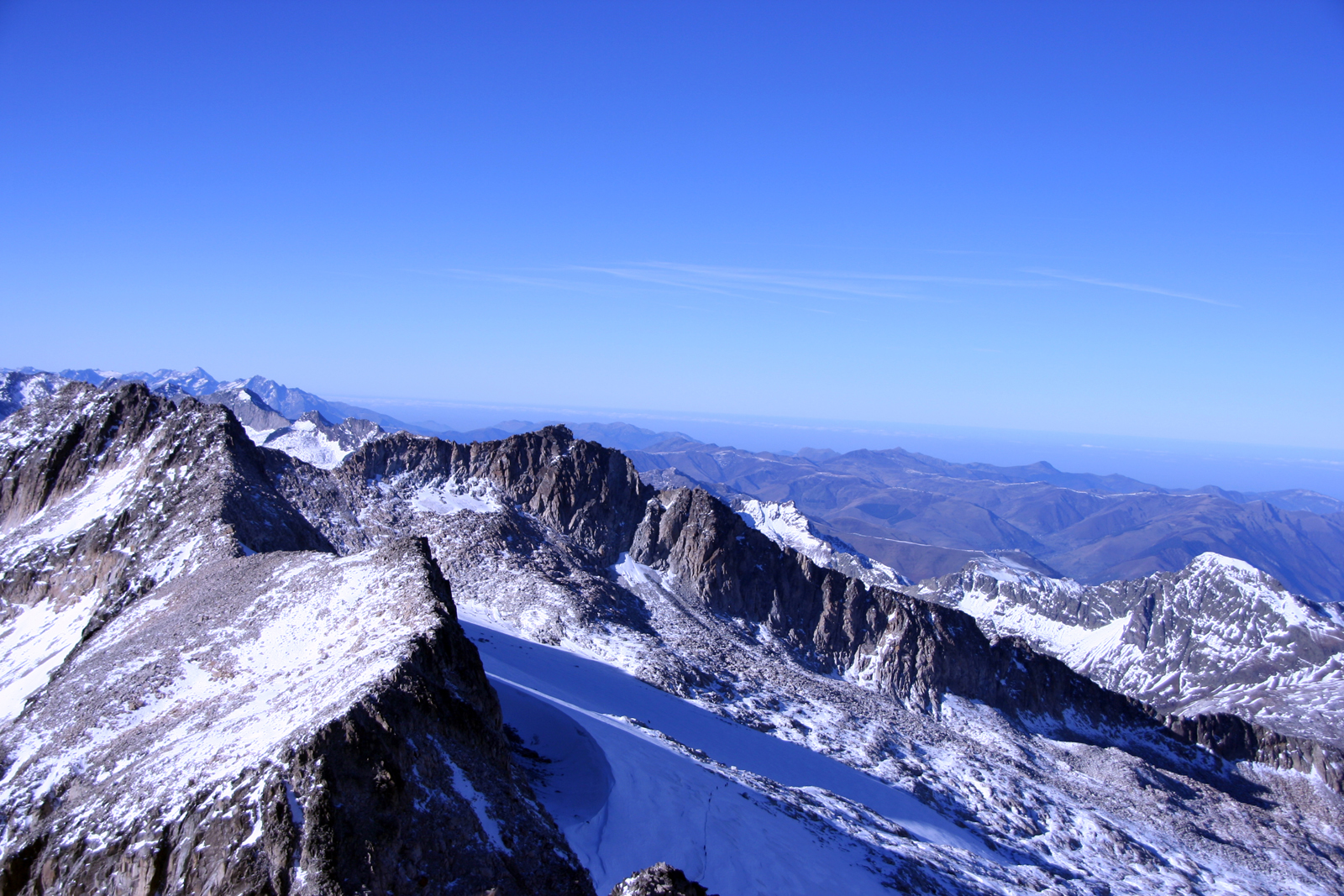
- Aneto glacier
- Interactive map of Aneto glacier
- Location: Benasque, Aragon, Spain
- Coordinates: 42°38′20″N 0°38′53″E
- Area: 90 ha
- Thickness: 50 m
- Status: Retreating

The Aneto glacier (Aragonese: Glaciar d'Aneto, Spanish : Glaciar del Aneto) is a glacier located on the northwestern flank of Aneto in the Pyrenees. It is the greatest glacier in the Pyrenees and the Iberian Peninsula and the 8th southernmost glacier in Europe.

The Aneto glacier has been affected severely by climate change, losing 30 meters of thickness since 1981, and in total losing 64% of its mass. In 2023, scientists conducting a study on the Aneto glacier found the glacier to be in a terminal state, and predicted that the Aneto glacier will be gone by the 2030s.

== See also ==
- Southernmost glacial mass in Europe
- List of glaciers in Europe
