= Mount Logan (Montana) =

Mountain in the state of Montana

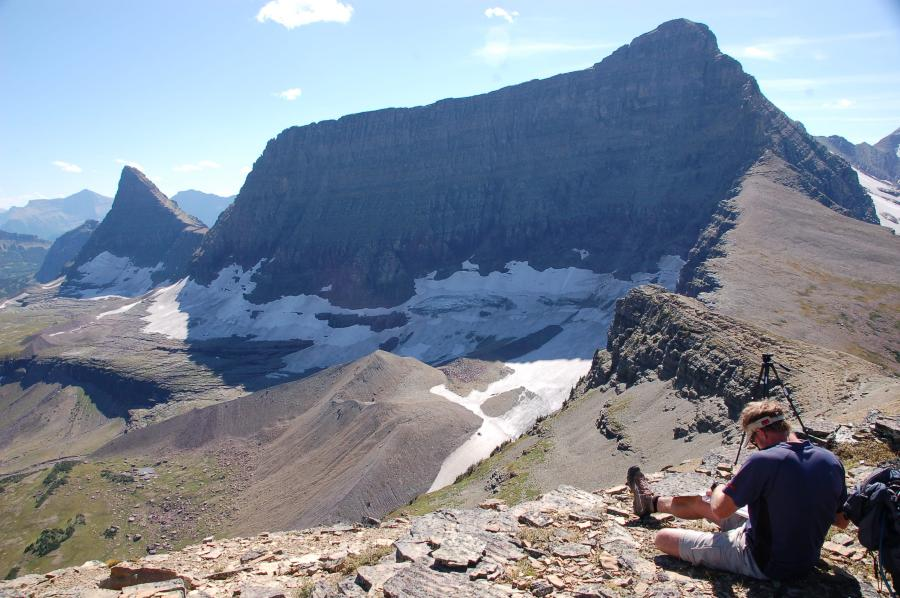
- Mount Logan at upper right looms above Logan Glacier and Clyde Peak (left)

Highest point
- Elevation: 9,244 ft (2,818 m)
- Prominence: 679 ft (207 m)
- Coordinates: 48°36′02″N 113°38′30″W

Geography
- Location within Montana Location within the United States
- Location: Flathead County, Montana, Glacier County, Montana, U.S.
- Parent range: Lewis Range
- Topo map(s): USGS Mount Jackson, MT

Mount Logan (9,244 feet (2,818 m)) is located in the Lewis Range, Glacier National Park in the U.S. state of Montana. Logan Glacier is immediately north of Mount Logan and Red Eagle Glacier lies to the east. Mount Logan is situated along the Continental Divide.

== See also ==
- Mountains and mountain ranges of Glacier National Park (U.S.)
