= Skuta Glacier =

Glacier in Slovenia

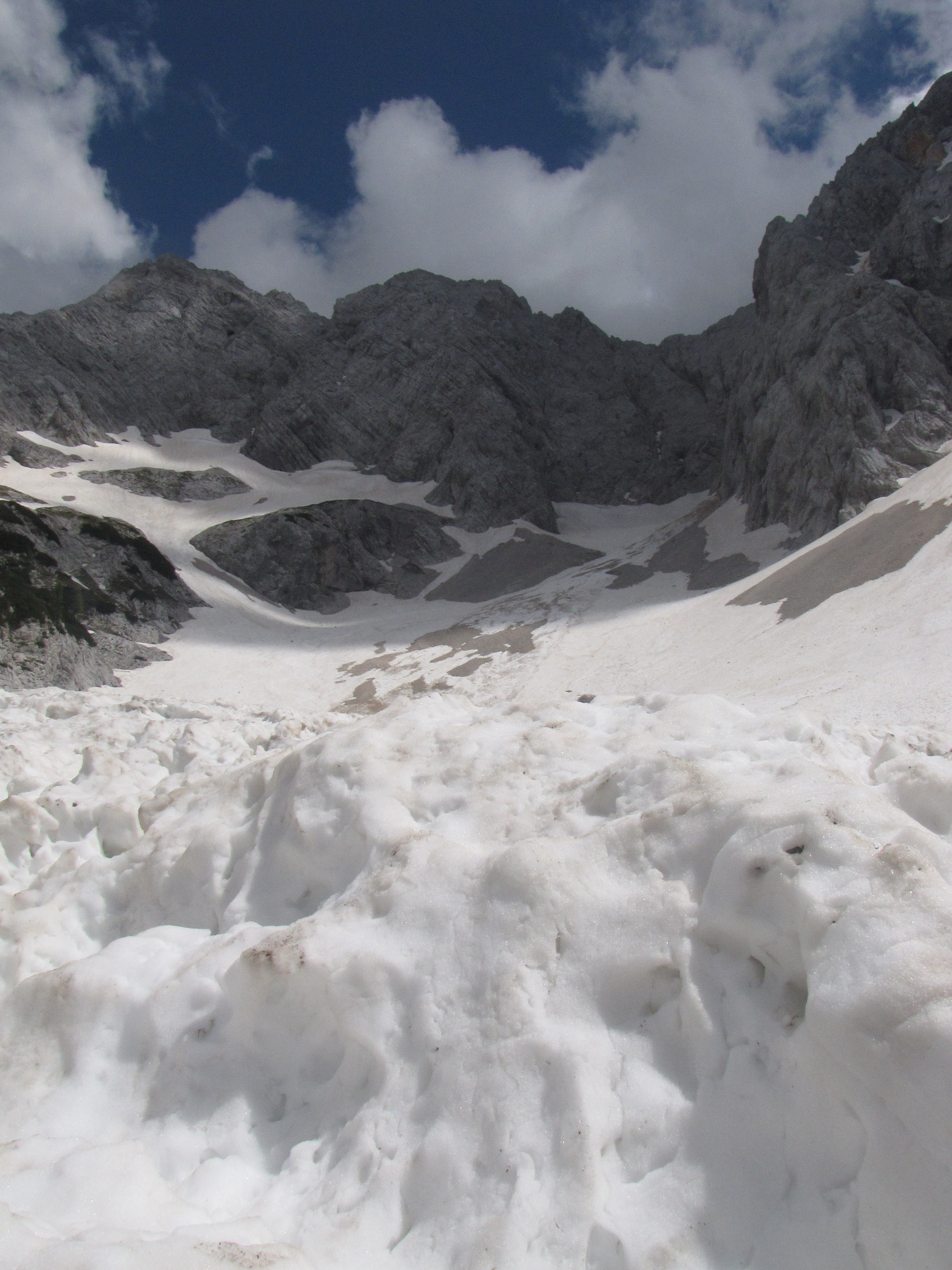
- Skuta Glacier and its snow fields in summer of 2014

- Location within Slovenia Location within Alps
- Interactive map of Skuta Glacier
- Type: Mountain glacier
- Location: mountain Skuta in Kamnik-Savinja Alps in Slovenia
- Coordinates: 46°21′55″N 14°33′36″E
- Area: 1.7 ha (4.2 acres)
- Status: Retreating

Skuta Glacier (Slovenian: Ledenik pod Skuto), located beneath mountain Skuta in Kamnik-Savinja Alps in Slovenia is the most south-eastern glacier in the Alps.

== Geography ==
The Skuta Glacier lies in a north-western facing cirque—a bowl-shaped hollow carved into the limestone mountains—of the Kamnik–Savinja Alps in northern Slovenia. Sheltered by steep rock walls from direct sunlight for much of the year, it sits at an average elevation of 2,070 metres above sea level, and, as of 2020, covers only about 1.5 hectares, making it one of Slovenia's two remaining glaciers alongside the Triglav Glacier. Skuta Glacier had an area of 2.8 hectares (6.9 acres) in 1950 and 1.7 hectares (4.2 acres) in 2013. It is one of the lowest elevation glaciers in the Alps.

Because it occupies a confined depression, the Skuta Glacier is classified as a very small glacier, or glacieret, a term used for ice bodies typically smaller than 0.1 km^{2}. Its position in a shaded cirque has helped it persist despite regional warming, but it remains highly sensitive to changes in temperature and snow accumulation.

== Monitoring and recent changes ==
Systematic field measurements of the Skuta Glacier began in 1946 using fixed reference stakes set into the ice or surrounding rock. At the end of each melt season, observers recorded how far the ice margin had retreated, both vertically and horizontally, with tape-measure and compass. From 1962 onward, regular photographs were taken from a single, non-fixed vantage point known locally as "At the Larch". By comparing these non-metric photographs to a modern digital terrain model (a computer-generated map of ground elevations), researchers applied a monoplotting technique—visually fitting the photo to the terrain model—to trace the glacier's three-dimensional outline and upper edge.

Analyses of seventeen photographs spanning 1970 to 2015 show that, although the glacier's surface area oscillated between about one and two hectares, there was little net loss in planimetric extent. In contrast, the elevation of its highest ice margin fell by nearly 40 metres over the same period, signalling substantial thinning. Independent ice-thickness measurements made in 2006 with a steam drill found an average thickness of 7 metres (maximum nearly 12 metres), giving a total ice volume of just under 80,000 cubic metres.

== Climate influences ==
No weather station exists directly on the Skuta Glacier, so climatologists use data from nearby high-altitude stations on the mountains Krvavec (1,742 m) and Kredarica (2,514 m), adjusted to the glacier's elevation by applying a lapse rate of −0.44 °C per 100 m. These records show a rise in mean annual air temperature from around −0.2 °C in the 1960s to about 1.7 °C by 2015—an increase sufficient to cross the freezing point in summer.

Equally important is the maximum seasonal snow-cover depth, which arrives mainly as avalanches and drifting snow in this cirque setting. Winters with deep snowpacks insulate the glacier, preserving its upper edge through the melt season, whereas years with shallow cover allow the ice margin to retreat to lower elevations. This interplay between rising temperatures and variable snow depth explains much of the glacier's year-to-year fluctuation in thickness, despite its relatively stable footprint.

== Skuta Glacier in figures ==
- Area: 1.7 hectares (4.2 acres) (as of 2007)
- Elevation: 2,020–2,120 m (6,630–6,960 ft)
- Average ice thickness: 7 m (23 ft) (as of September 2006)
- Maximum ice thickness: 12 m (39 ft) (as of September 2006)
- Volume: 80,000 m^{3} (2,800,000 ft^{3}) (as of September 2006)
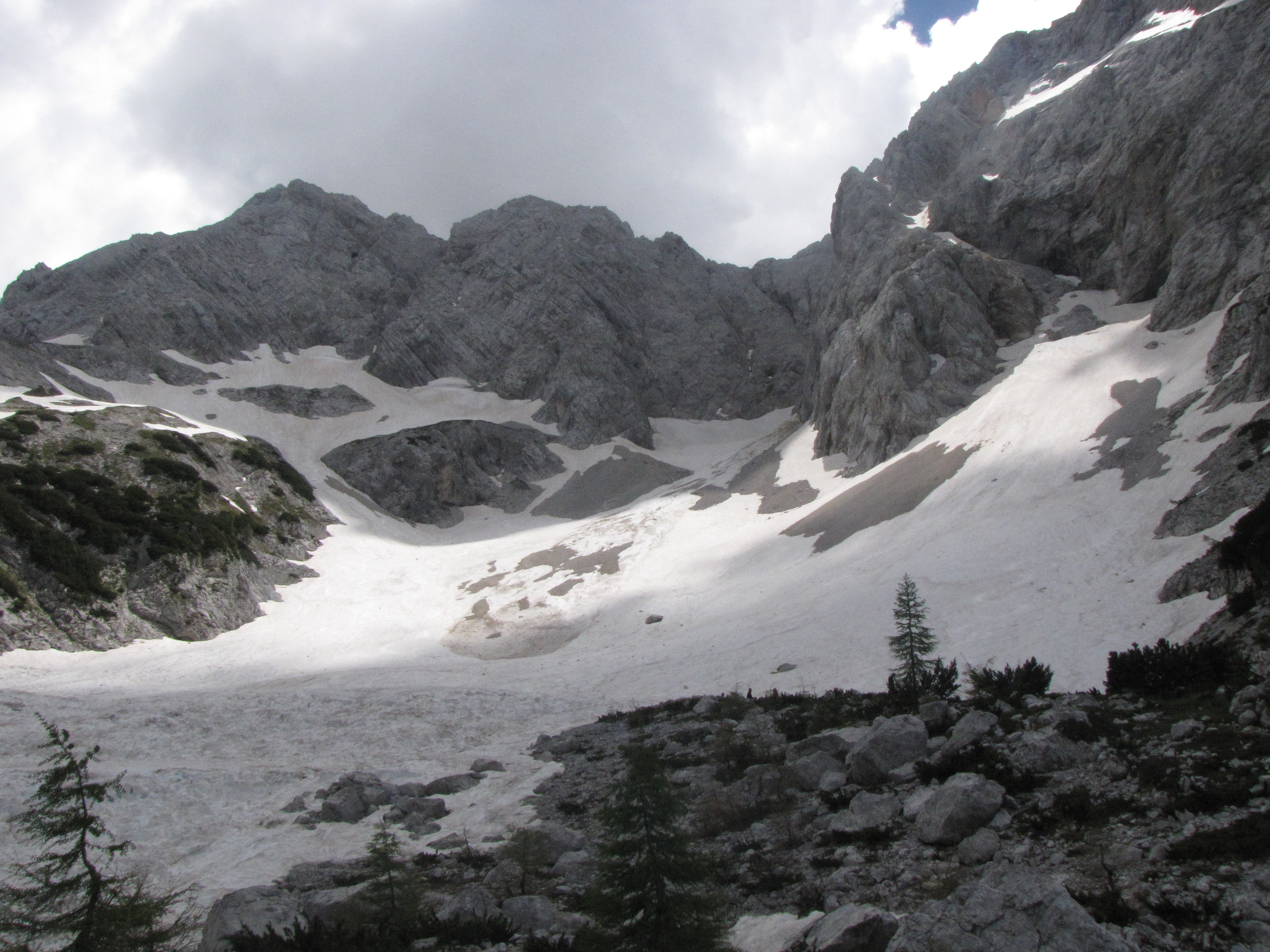
Snow fields beneath the glacier

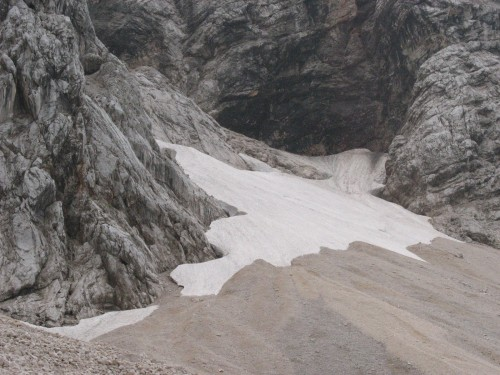
Snow fields around the Skuta Glacier

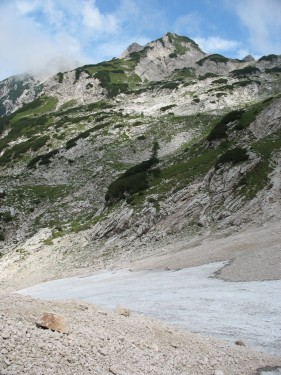
Snow fields beneath the Skuta Glacier

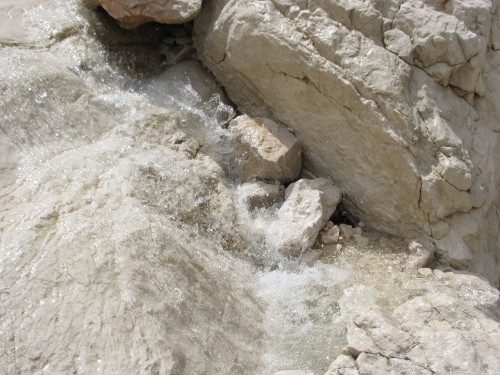
The glacier gives birth to the small stream

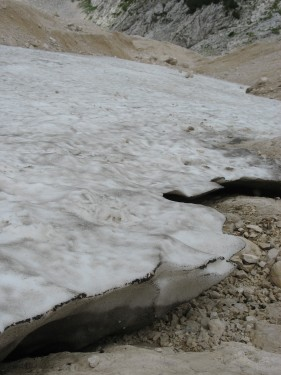
Glacier snow

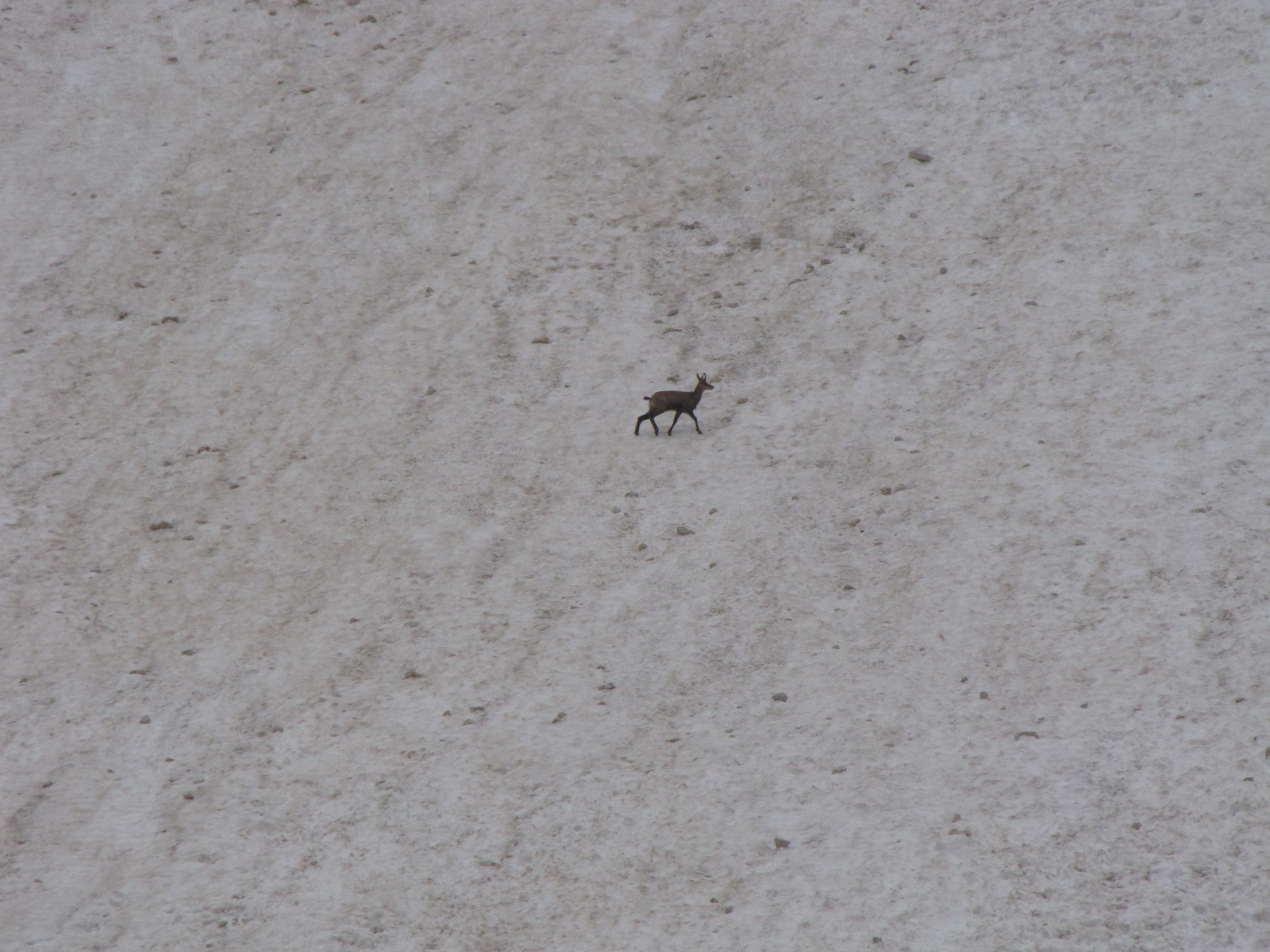
Chamois passing the glacier
