= Red Eagle Lake =

Lake in the American state of Montana

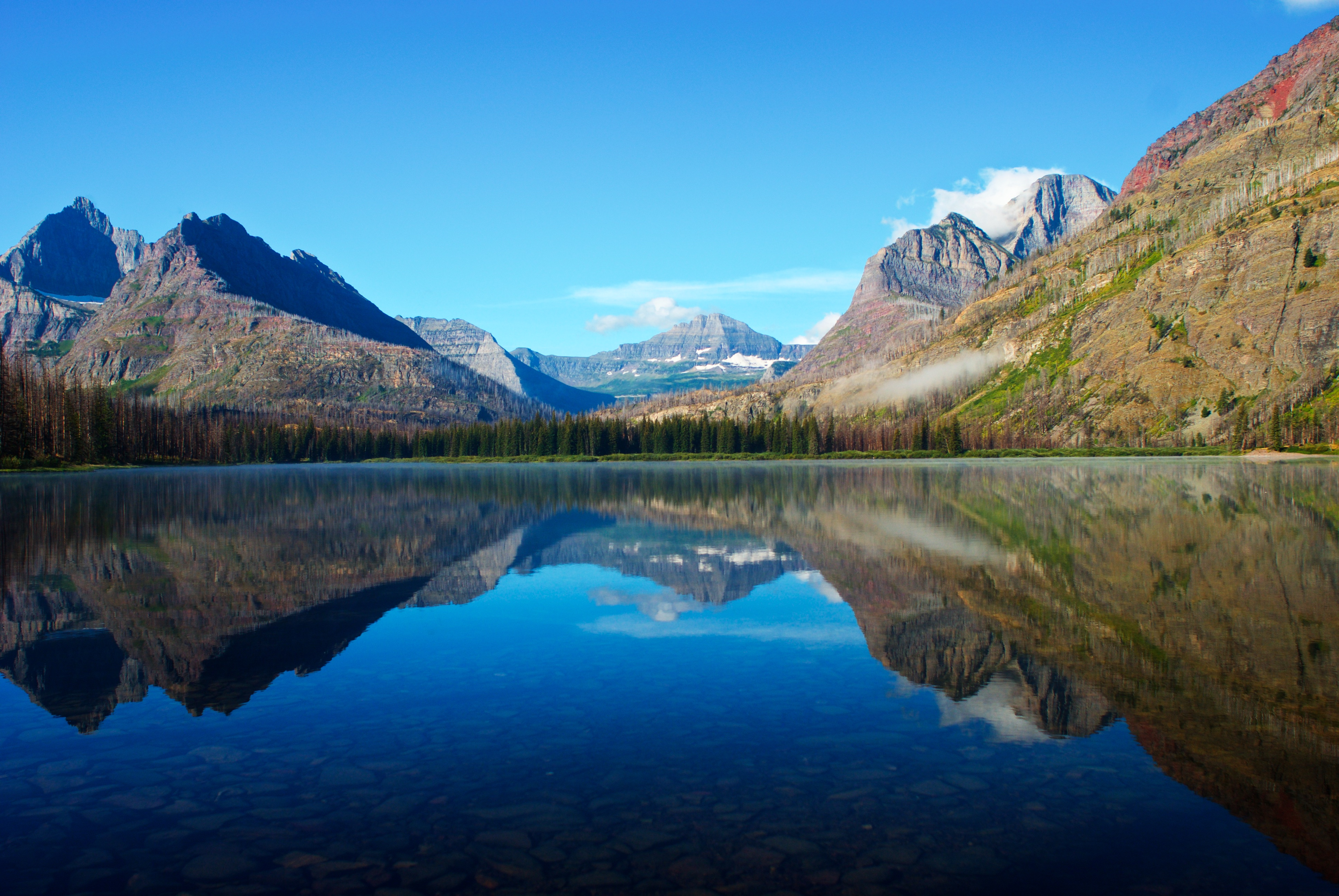
- Red Eagle Lake with Clyde Peak centered in the distance]]

- Location within Montana Location within the United States
- Location: Glacier National Park, Glacier County, Montana, US
- Coordinates: 48°39′12″N 113°30′22″W
- Type: Natural
- Primary inflows: Red Eagle Creek
- Primary outflows: Red Eagle Creek
- Basin countries: United States
- Max. length: .75 miles (1.21 km)
- Max. width: .30 miles (0.48 km)
- Surface elevation: 4,722 ft (1,439 m)

Red Eagle Lake is located in Glacier National Park, in the U. S. state of Montana. Red Eagle Mountain rises to the west of the lake and Saint Mary Lake is to the north. Red Eagle Lake is accessible from the Triple Divide Trail and is a 7.6 miles (12.2 km) hike from St. Mary, Montana.

== See also ==
- List of lakes in Glacier County, Montana
