= Snezhnika =

Glacier in Bulgaria

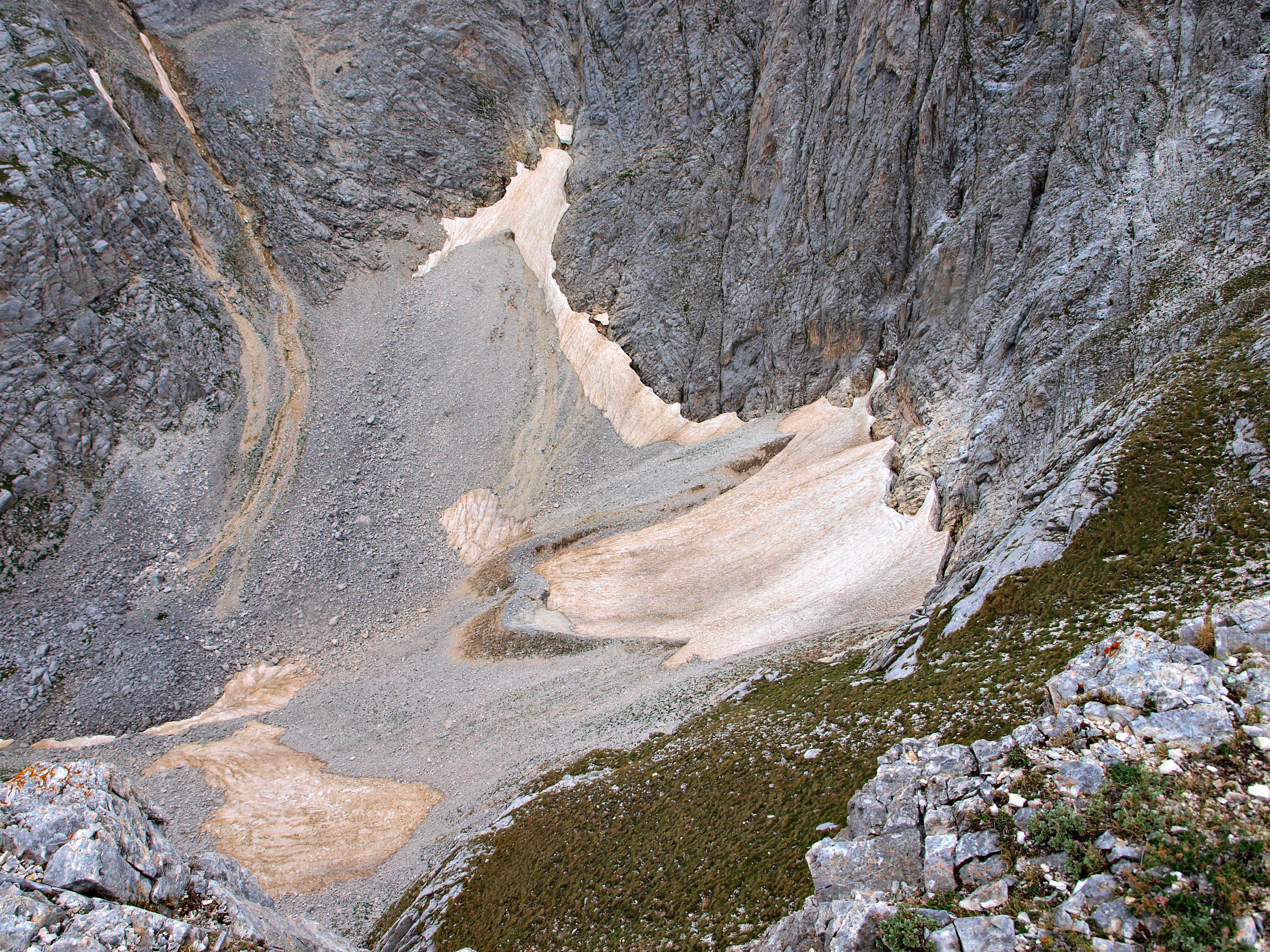
- The Snezhnika glacieret in July 2012

- Location within Bulgaria Location within Europe
- Interactive map of Snezhnika
- Type: cirque glacieret
- Location: Pirin, Bulgaria
- Coordinates: 41°46′09″N 23°24′10″E
- Area: 0.01 km^{2} (0.0039 sq mi)
- Length: 70 to 100 m (230 to 330 ft)
- Thickness: 8 to 11 metres (26 to 36 ft) firn; up to 20 metres (66 ft) snow cover
- Status: stable

Snezhnika (Bulgarian: Снежника 'the snow patch') is a glacieret in the Pirin Mountains of Bulgaria, a remnant of the former Vihren Glacier. The glacieret lies at an elevation between 2,425 m (7,956 ft) and 2,480 m (8,140 ft) in the deep Golemiya Kazan cirque at the steep northern foot of Vihren (2,914 m (9,560 ft)), Pirin's highest summit. Due to the relatively easy access and its location along a popular hiking trail, Snezhnika is Bulgaria's most famous glacieret. Snezhnika has an average area of 0.01 km^{2} (0.0039 sq mi) and in 2006 it had a volume of 30,000 m^{3} (1,100,000 ft^{3}).

Snezhnika's size varies in length from 70 to 100 metres (west to east) and in width from 40 to 90 metres (north to south). Its firn is 8–11 m thick at the base and its snow cover, which is mostly fed by avalanche snow, can be as deep as 20 metres in March and April. Snezhnika's latitude of 41°46′09″ N makes it the southernmost glacial mass in Europe; the nearby Banski Suhodol Glacier below Koncheto, although larger, is slightly to the north.

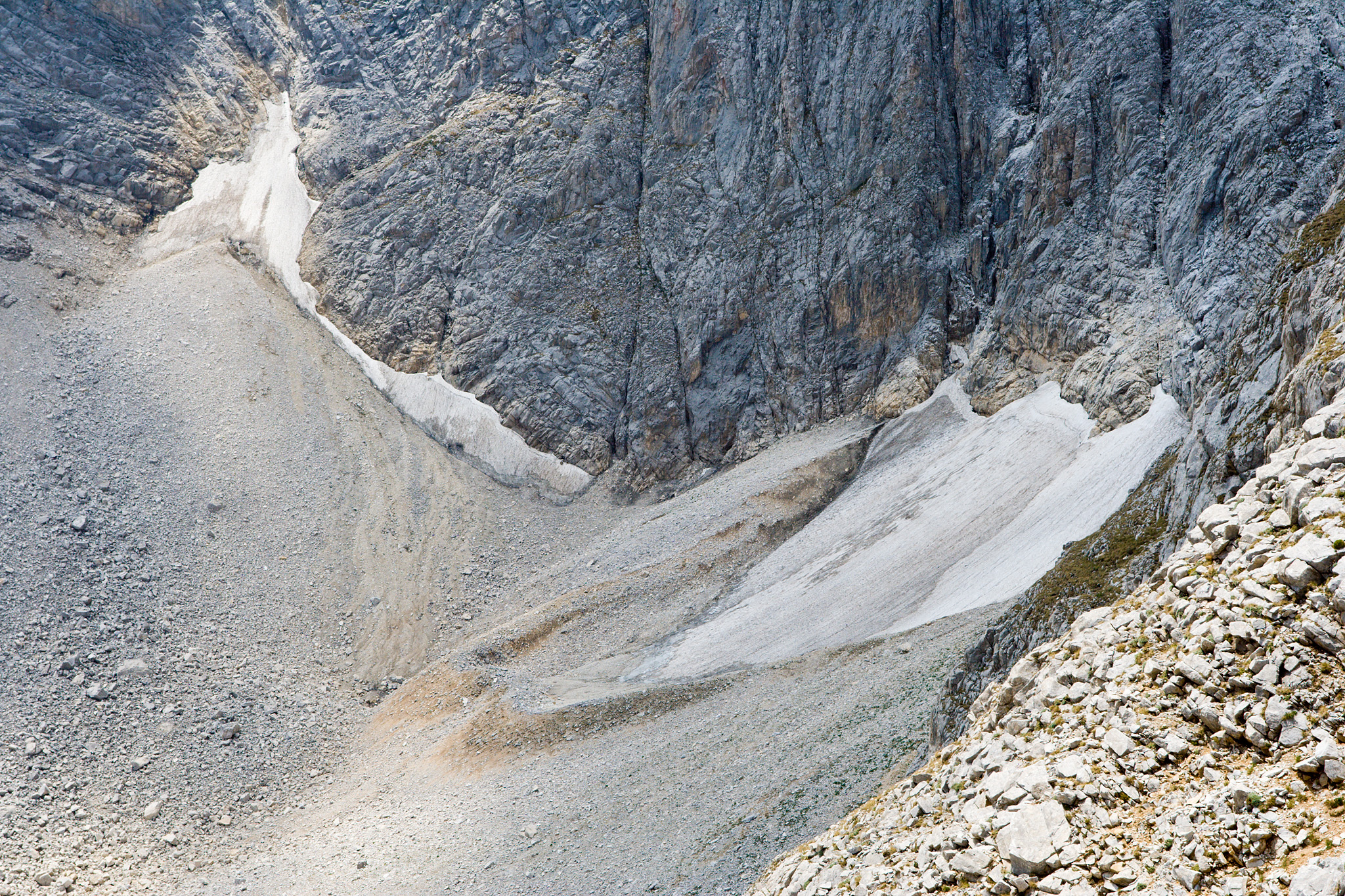
Snezhnika in July 2007

Snezhnika lies in an east-facing hollow adjacent to the almost vertical north wall of Vihren and is surrounded on three sides by a moraine or moraine-like rock debris. The north wall of Vihren supplies Snezhnika with avalanche snow. The strong shade of the high vertical wall and the high albedo of its white marble as well as the karstified bottom of the hollow provide suitable conditions for glaciation.

Snezhnika has existed continuously since at least the Little Ice Age, when it presumably reached a maximum area of 0.93 hectares, and its age is estimated at more than 500 years. While its size varies greatly from year to year, it has remained relatively stable from the mid-20th to the 21st century, despite low precipitation and a relatively high and increasing annual mean temperature. Snezhnika exhibits less variability in size than the glaciers and glacierets of Albania (below Maja Jezercë) and Montenegro (Debeli Namet), which lie at a lower altitude and rely on heavier precipitation. Otherwise, Snezhnika has a very comparable topography to these and to the Calderone glacier of the Apennines.

The presence of perennial snow in Pirin has been documented since the 1920s. The first in-depth study of Snezhnika dates to 1957–61 and was conducted by Vladimir Popov of the Bulgarian Academy of Sciences's Institute of Geography. Further research was done by a team under Karsten Grunewald of the Landscape Research Centre in Dresden, Germany, from 1994 to 2007.
