= Logan Glacier (Montana) =

Glacier in Montana, United States

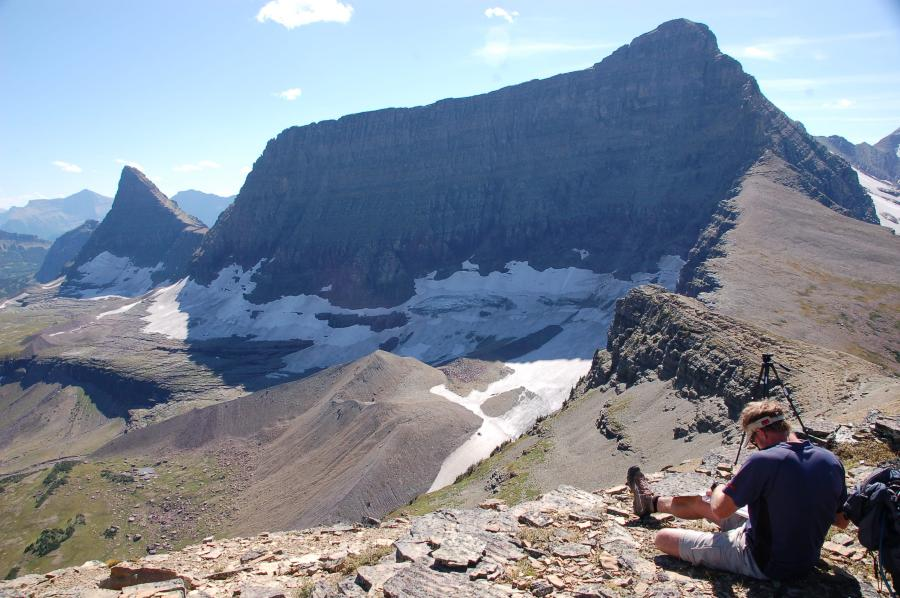
- Logan Glacier at right beneath Mount Logan. Red Eagle Glacier is visible at far left.

- Location within Montana
- Type: Glacieret
- Location: Glacier National Park, Glacier County, Montana, U.S.
- Coordinates: 48°36′07″N 113°37′57″W
- Area: Approximately 75 acres (30 ha) in 2005
- Terminus: Talus
- Status: Retreating

Logan Glacier is in Glacier National Park in the U.S. state of Montana. The glacier is situated in a cirque to the northeast of Mount Logan. Just east of the Continental Divide, Logan Glacier is northwest of Red Eagle Glacier. Estimated in 2005 to cover an area of 75 acres (0.30 km^{2}), Logan Glacier covered almost 125 acres (0.51 km^{2}) in 1966, a reduction in area of 40 percent in about 40 years. Comparing images of the glacier taken in 1914 with those from 2009, indicates that the glacier has experienced extensive retreat.

== See also ==
- List of glaciers in the United States
- Glaciers in Glacier National Park (U.S.)
