= Red Eagle Glacier =

Glacier in Montana, United States

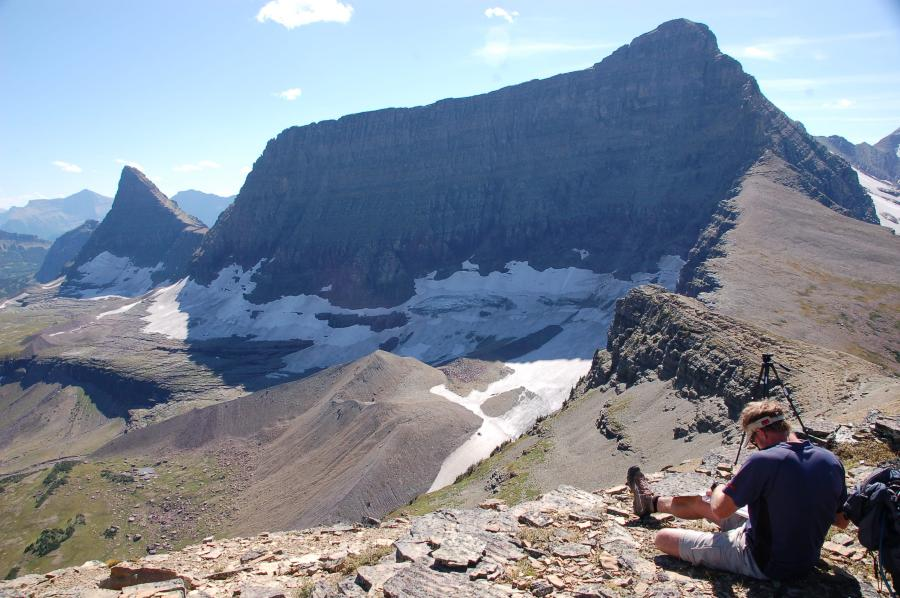
- Red Eagle Glacier at far left beneath Clyde Peak, while Logan Glacier is visible at right beneath Mount Logan.

- Location within Montana
- Type: Glacieret
- Location: Glacier National Park, Glacier County, Montana, U.S.
- Coordinates: 48°35′33″N 113°37′09″W
- Area: 24 acres (9.7 ha) in 2005
- Terminus: Talus
- Status: Retreating

Red Eagle Glacier is a glacier remnant (glacieret) in Glacier National Park in the U.S. state of Montana. The glacieret is a hanging glacier located on the north slope of Clyde Peak, and to the southeast of Mount Logan and Logan Glacier. Between 1966 and 2005, Red Eagle Glacier lost 53 percent of its surface area and now covers less than 25 acres (0.10 km^{2}) which is below the threshold to qualify as an active glacier. Comparing images of the glacier taken in 1914 with those from 2009, indicates that the glacier has experienced extensive retreat.

== See also ==
- List of glaciers in the United States
- Glaciers in Glacier National Park (U.S.)
