= Banski Suhodol Glacier =

Glacier in Bulgaria

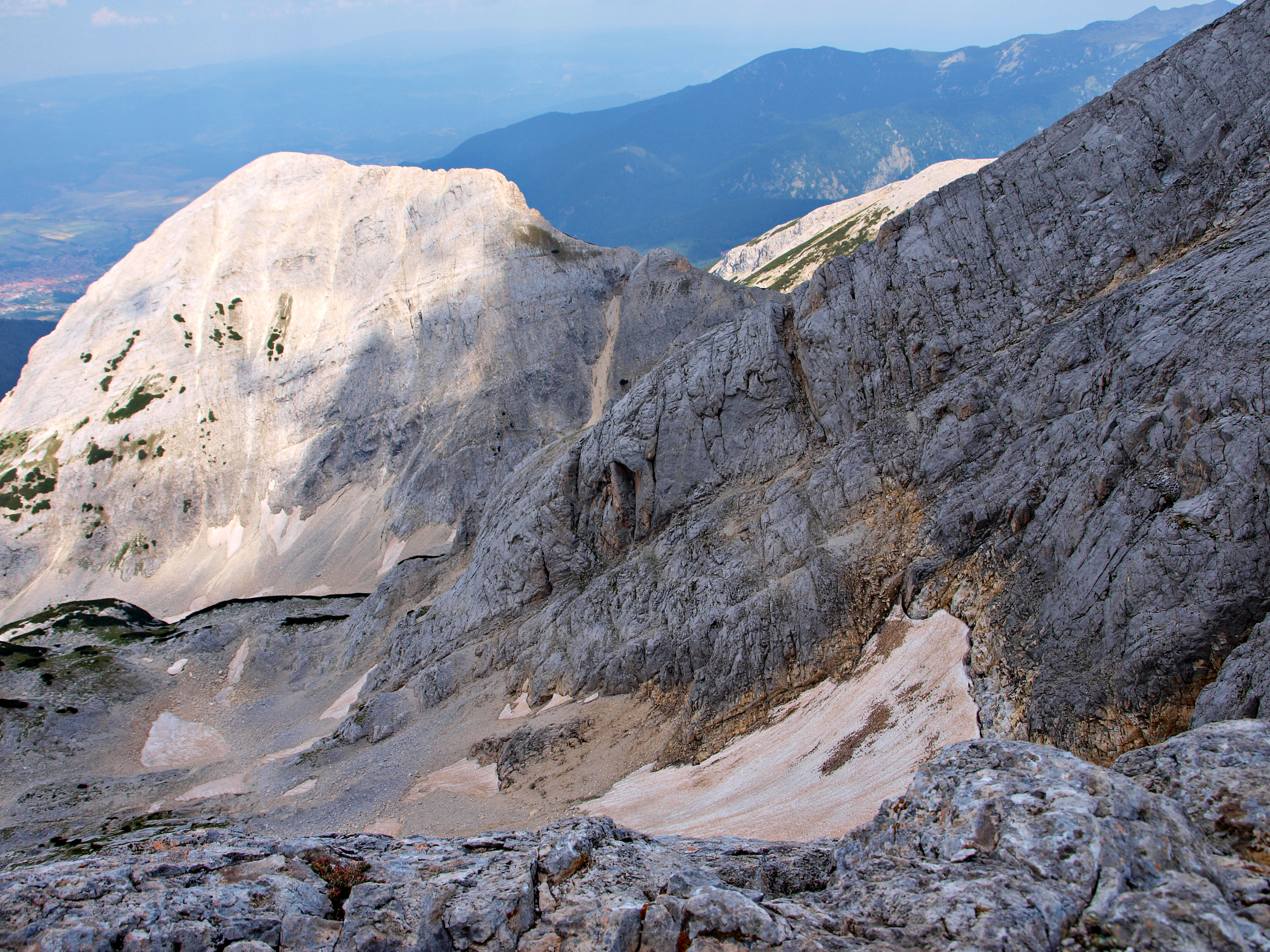
- The Banski Suhodol Glacier in July 2012.

- Location within Bulgaria Location within Europe
- Interactive map of Banski Suhodol Glacier
- Location: Pirin Mountains
- Coordinates: 41°47′00″N 23°23′40″E

The Banski Suhodol Glacier (Bulgarian: Ледника в Бански Суходол, Lednika v Banski Suhodol) is a glacieret in the Pirin Mountains of Bulgaria. It lies below the Kutelo peak (2908 m.) in the upper Banski Suhodol Valley (Bulgarian: Бански Суходол).

== Geography ==
The glacier is on the northern slope of the Kutelo summit and is shaded from the east by the Koncheto ridge. After the nearby Snezhnika glacier (latitude of 41°46′09″ N) Banski Suhodol glacier is the southernmost in Europe, followed by three small glaciers below the Maja Jezerce summit in northern Albania, the Calderone glacier in the Gran Sasso mountain in Italy, and Debeli Namet glacier in Montenegro. Together with the nearby Snezhnika glacieret below Vihren, it is one of two surviving glacial masses in Bulgaria.
