= Glacieret =

Very small glacier

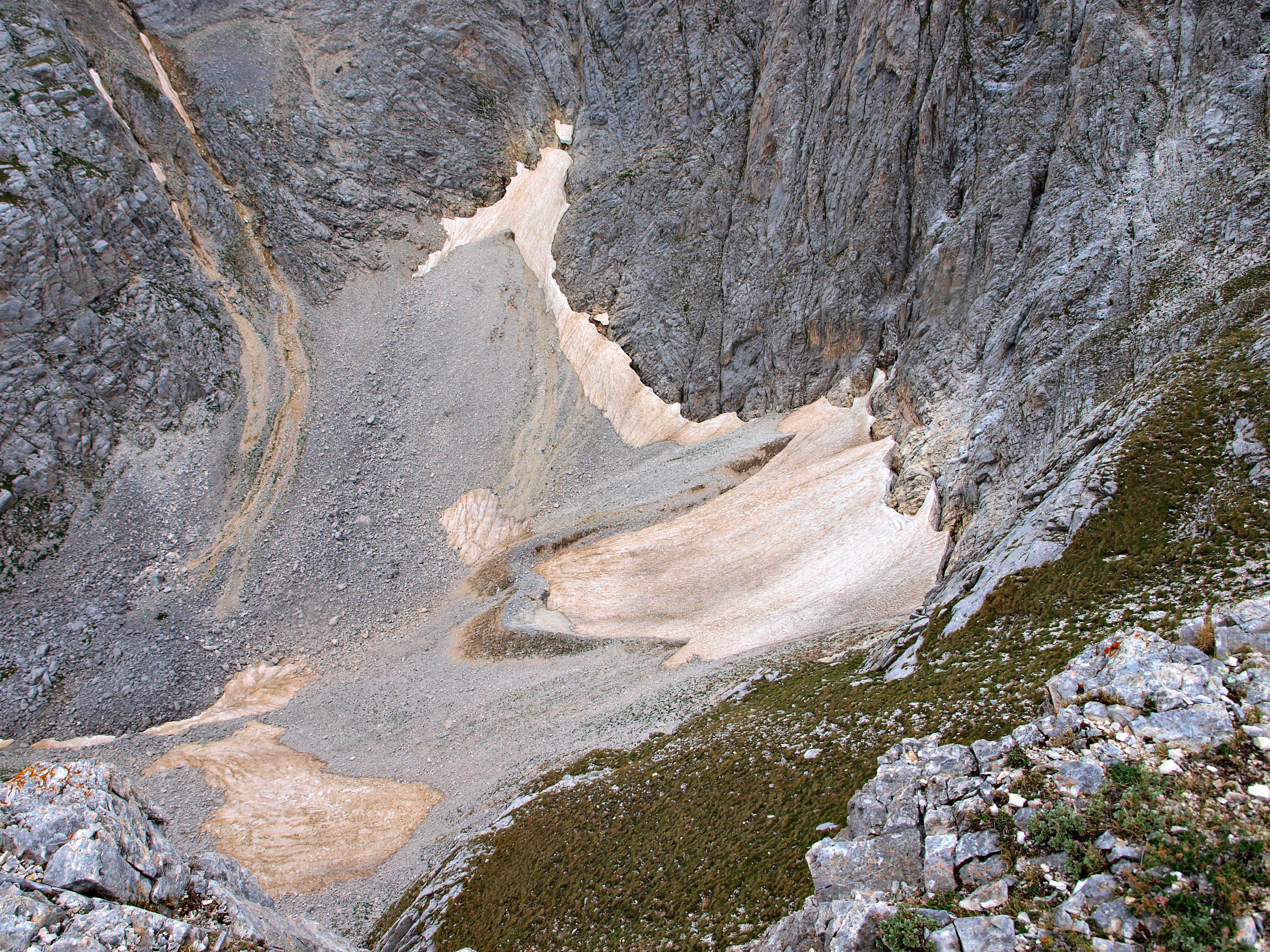
Snezhnika is a glacieret in Bulgaria's Pirin Mountains.

A glacieret is a very small glacier, with a surface area less than 0.1 km^{2} (25 acres). The term is sometimes incorrectly used to refer to a large, persistent snow patch of firn or névé.

== Characteristics ==
Sometimes hardly larger than snowfields and perennial firn patches, glacierets tend to have little ice movement, with accumulation and ablation zones difficult to detect. During the last ice age, glacierets were an intermediate stage between firn patches and fully fledged glaciers, but in the present day, glacierets are usually remnants of larger glaciers that existed. Due to their small size, they are at a higher risk of melting due to climate change than larger glaciers.

== Examples ==
- Snezhnika in the Pirin range of Bulgaria was the southernmost known glacier in Europe before the discovery of glaciers on Mount Bazardüzü.
- The Banski Suhodol Glacieret, also in the Pirin, is the only other surviving glacial mass in Bulgaria.
- There are some glacierets in the Picos del Infierno range of the Pyrenees.
- The Red Eagle Glacier in Montana, following a century of retreat, has dropped below the threshold of an active glacier and become a mere glacieret.
- Shepard Glacier in Glacier National Park converted to a glacieret in 2009.
- There are many glacierets on Mount Kenya, ranging from surface areas of 0.01 to 0.09 km^{2}.
- The last glacier of the Apennines, the Calderone glacier, is a glacieret with a surface area of 0.03 km^{2} in 2001.

=== Former glacierets that melted ===
Glacierets that melt usually remain perennial snow patches and gather back some firn.

- The glacieret on the Corral de la Veleta in Spain's Sierra Nevada was the southernmost glacial mass in Europe until it melted in 1913.
- In the Kazania cirque of Mount Olympus, a glacieret existed during the Little Ice Age.
