= Böblingen (Bundestag electoral district) =

Federal electoral district of Germany

260 Böblingen
- Electoral district for the Bundestag
- Böblingen in 2025
- State: Baden-Württemberg
- Population: 370,000 (2019)
- Electorate: 245,553 (2021)
- Major settlements: Sindelfingen; Böblingen; Leonberg
- Area: 563.2 km^{2}

Current electoral district
- Created: 1949
- Party: CDU
- Member: Marc Biadacz
- Elected: 2017, 2021, 2025

Böblingen is an electoral constituency (German: Wahlkreis) represented in the Bundestag. It elects one member via first-past-the-post voting. Under the current constituency numbering system, it is designated as constituency 260. It is located in central Baden-Württemberg, comprising the district of Böblingen.

Böblingen was created for the inaugural 1949 federal election. Since 2017, it has been represented by Marc Biadacz of the Christian Democratic Union (CDU).

== Geography ==
Böblingen is located in central Baden-Württemberg. As of the 2021 federal election, it comprises the entirety of the Böblingen district excluding the municipalities of Steinenbronn, Waldenbuch, and Weissach.

== History ==
Böblingen was created in 1949. In the 1965 through 1976 elections, it was named Leonberg – Vaihingen. In the 1949 election, it was Württemberg-Baden Landesbezirk Württemberg constituency 5 in the numbering system. In the 1953 through 1961 elections, it was number 167. In the 1965 through 1976 elections, it was number 169. In the 1980 through 1998 elections, it was number 164. In the 2002 and 2005 elections, it was number 261. Since the 2009 election, it has been number 260.

Originally, the constituency comprised the districts of Böblingen, Leonberg, and Vaihingen. In the 1965 through 1976 elections, it comprised the districts of Leonberg and Vaihingen as well as the municipalities of Sindelfingen, Grafenau, and Magstadt from the Böblingen district. In the 1980 through 2002 elections, it was coterminous with the Böblingen district. In the 2005 election, it lost the Steinenbronn and Waldenbuch municipalities. In the 2017 election, it further lost the Weissach municipality.

Election	No.	Name	Borders
1949	5	Böblingen	Böblingen district; Leonberg district; Vaihingen district
1953	167	Böblingen	Böblingen district; Leonberg district; Vaihingen district
1957	167	Böblingen	Böblingen district; Leonberg district; Vaihingen district
1961	167	Böblingen	Böblingen district; Leonberg district; Vaihingen district
1965	169	Leonberg – Vaihingen	Leonberg district; Vaihingen district; Böblingen district (only Sindelfingen, Grafenau, and Magstadt municipalities)
1969	169	Leonberg – Vaihingen	Leonberg district; Vaihingen district; Böblingen district (only Sindelfingen, Grafenau, and Magstadt municipalities)
1972	169	Leonberg – Vaihingen	Leonberg district; Vaihingen district; Böblingen district (only Sindelfingen, Grafenau, and Magstadt municipalities)
1976	169	Leonberg – Vaihingen	Leonberg district; Vaihingen district; Böblingen district (only Sindelfingen, Grafenau, and Magstadt municipalities)
1980	164	Böblingen	Böblingen district
1983	164	Böblingen	Böblingen district
1987	164	Böblingen	Böblingen district
1990	164	Böblingen	Böblingen district
1994	164	Böblingen	Böblingen district
1998	164	Böblingen	Böblingen district
2002	261	Böblingen	Böblingen district
2005	261	Böblingen	Böblingen district (excluding Steinenbronn and Waldenbuch municipalities)
2009	260	Böblingen	Böblingen district (excluding Steinenbronn and Waldenbuch municipalities)
2013	260	Böblingen	Böblingen district (excluding Steinenbronn and Waldenbuch municipalities)
2017	260	Böblingen	Böblingen district (excluding Steinenbronn, Waldenbuch, and Weissach municipalities)
2021	260	Böblingen	Böblingen district (excluding Steinenbronn, Waldenbuch, and Weissach municipalities)
2025	260	Böblingen	Böblingen district (excluding Steinenbronn, Waldenbuch, and Weissach municipalities)

== Members ==
The constituency has been held by the Christian Democratic Union (CDU) during all but one Bundestag term since its creation. It was first represented by Paul Bausch from 1949 to 1965, followed by Peter Petersen from 1965 to 1972. Hans Geiger of the Social Democratic Party (SPD) was elected in 1972 and served one term. Former member Petersen regained it for the CDU in 1976 and served until 1990. Brigitte Baumeister was representative from 1990 to 2002, followed by Clemens Binninger from 2002 to 2017. Marc Biadacz was elected in 2017 and re-elected in 2021.

Election	Member	Party	%
1949	Paul Bausch	CDU	29.8
1953	Paul Bausch	CDU	45.6
1957	Paul Bausch	CDU	50.1
1961	Paul Bausch	CDU	36.9
1965	Peter Petersen	CDU	45.4
1969	Peter Petersen	CDU	47.2
1972	Hans Geiger	SPD	46.2
1976	Peter Petersen	CDU	48.5
1980	Peter Petersen	CDU	48.0
1983	Peter Petersen	CDU	56.8
1987	Peter Petersen	CDU	50.7
1990	Brigitte Baumeister	CDU	47.7
1994	Brigitte Baumeister	CDU	50.3
1998	Brigitte Baumeister	CDU	44.0
2002	Clemens Binninger	CDU	46.8
2005	Clemens Binninger	CDU	49.8
2009	Clemens Binninger	CDU	45.1
2013	Clemens Binninger	CDU	54.3
2017	Marc Biadacz	CDU	38.8
2021	Marc Biadacz	CDU	29.7
2025	Marc Biadacz	CDU	37.3

== Election results ==
=== 2025 election ===
Federal election (2025): Böblingen
Notes:	Blue background denotes the winner of the electorate vote. Pink background denotes a candidate elected from their party list. Yellow background denotes an electorate win by a list member, or other incumbent. A ✓ or ✗ denotes status of any incumbent, win or lose respectively.						
Party	Candidate	Votes	%	±%	Party votes	%	±%
CDU	✓ Marc Biadacz	76,031	37.3	▲7.7	67,755	33.2	▲7.1
SPD	Jasmina Hostert	34,197	16.8	▼4.3	29,831	14.4	▼6.2
FDP	Florian Toncar	12,438	6.1	▼10.5	14.311	7.0	▼ -11.1
Greens	Tobias Bacherle	27,409	13.5	▼2.1	28,451	13.9	▼2.8
AfD	Markus Frohnmaier	34,826	17.1	▲8.8	35,768	17.5	▲8.9
FW	Norbert Volz	6,045	3.0	▲0.5	2,980	1.5	▼0.2
Left	Thomas Walz	9,936	4.9	▲2.5	12,167	6.0	▲3.3
dieBasis				▼1.5	456	0.2	▼1.1
Tierschutzpartei					1,372	0.7	▼0.2
PARTEI				▼0.9	778	0.4	▼0.4
Team Todenhöfer							▼0.7
Pirates							▼0.4
ÖDP				▼0.4	329	0.2	▼0.1
Independent	Friedhild Miller	590	0.3				
Volt	Hasso Kraus	1,826	0.9	▲0.6	1,323	0.6	▲0.3
Bündnis C					422	0.2	0.0
Bürgerbewegung							▼0.4
BSW					8,192	4.0	
BD					{{{party votes}}}	{{{party percent}}}	{{{party change}}}
Humanists							▼0.1
Gesundheitsforschung							▼0.1
MLPD	Johanna Jäckh-Vermeulen	280	0.1	0.0	109	0.1	0.0
Informal votes		1,381			942		
Total valid votes		203,578			204,016		
Turnout		204,959	84.3	▲4.8			
CDU hold	Majority			▲7.7			

=== 2021 election ===
Federal election (2021): Böblingen
Notes:	Blue background denotes the winner of the electorate vote. Pink background denotes a candidate elected from their party list. Yellow background denotes an electorate win by a list member, or other incumbent. A ✓ or ✗ denotes status of any incumbent, win or lose respectively.						
Party	Candidate	Votes	%	±%	Party votes	%	±%
CDU	✓ Marc Biadacz	57,504	29.7	▼9.1	50,675	26.1	▼9.3
SPD	Jasmina Hostert	40,844	21.1	▲1.5	39,955	20.6	▲5.0
FDP	Florian Toncar	32,184	16.6	▲3.8	35,082	18.1	▲2.9
Greens	Tobias Bacherle	30,211	15.6	▲3.6	32,594	16.8	▲4.1
AfD	Markus Frohnmaier	16,175	8.3	▼2.9	16,810	8.7	▼3.1
FW	Norbert Volz	4,790	2.5		3,306	1.7	▲1.0
Left	Richard Pitterle	4,548	2.3	▼2.7	5,141	2.6	▼2.7
dieBasis	Annabel Jones	2,856	1.5		2,593	1.3	
Tierschutzpartei					1,767	0.9	▲0.2
PARTEI	Tim Manojlović	1,815	0.9		1,447	0.7	▲0.1
Team Todenhöfer					1,267	0.7	
Pirates					691	0.4	▼0.2
ÖDP	André Mondry	783	0.4		442	0.2	0.0
Independent	Hans Tolzin	690	0.4				
Volt	Birgit Seibel	665	0.3		654	0.3	
Bündnis C					471	0.2	
Bürgerbewegung					246	0.1	
DiB	Guido Drehsen	320	0.2		197	0.1	▼0.1
Independent	Friedhild Miller	239	0.1				
Humanists					197	0.1	
Gesundheitsforschung					183	0.1	
NPD					150	0.1	▼0.2
MLPD	Johanna Jäckh-Vermeulen	170	0.1	▼0.1	97	0.0	0.0
Bündnis 21					67	0.0	
LKR					48	0.0	
DKP					34	0.0	0.0
Informal votes		1,541			1,221		
Total valid votes		193,794			194,114		
Turnout		195,335	79.5	▼0.5			
CDU hold	Majority	16,660	8.6	▼10.6			

=== 2017 election ===
Federal election (2017): Böblingen
Notes:	Blue background denotes the winner of the electorate vote. Pink background denotes a candidate elected from their party list. Yellow background denotes an electorate win by a list member, or other incumbent. A ✓ or ✗ denotes status of any incumbent, win or lose respectively.						
Party	Candidate	Votes	%	±%	Party votes	%	±%
CDU	Marc Biadacz	75,323	38.8	▼15.4	68,991	35.4	▼11.4
SPD	Jasmina Hostert	38,053	19.6	▼4.2	30,296	15.5	▼4.5
FDP	Florian Toncar	24,867	12.8	▲9.4	29,510	15.1	▲8.0
Greens	Tobias Bacherle	23,206	11.9	▲2.6	24,746	12.7	▲2.4
AfD	Markus Frohnmaier	21,842	11.2		22,874	11.7	▲6.6
Left	Richard Pitterle	9,715	5.0	▲0.9	10,434	5.4	▲1.0
FW					1,429	0.7	▲0.1
Tierschutzpartei					1,361	0.7	0.0
PARTEI					1,262	0.6	
Pirates					1,028	0.5	▼1.7
Independent	Friedhild Miller	934	0.5				
NPD					487	0.2	▼0.7
ÖDP					469	0.2	0.0
DM					380	0.2	
Tierschutzallianz					371	0.2	
DiB					336	0.2	
BGE					244	0.1	
V-Partei³					229	0.1	
Menschliche Welt					215	0.1	
MLPD	Johanna Jäckh-Vermeulen	346	0.2	0.0	157	0.1	0.0
DIE RECHTE					55	0.0	
DKP					26	0.0	
Informal votes		2,271			1,657		
Total valid votes		194,286			194,900		
Turnout		196,557	80.0	▲2.8			
CDU hold	Majority	37,270	19.2	▼11.4			

=== 2013 election ===
Federal election (2013): Böblingen
Notes:	Blue background denotes the winner of the electorate vote. Pink background denotes a candidate elected from their party list. Yellow background denotes an electorate win by a list member, or other incumbent. A ✓ or ✗ denotes status of any incumbent, win or lose respectively.						
Party	Candidate	Votes	%	±%	Party votes	%	±%
CDU	✓ Clemens Binninger	102,408	54.3	▲9.1	88,734	46.9	▲13.0
SPD	Joachim Rücker	44,676	23.7	▲3.6	37,808	20.0	▲0.9
Greens	Sven Reisch	17,750	9.4	▼3.8	19,613	10.4	▼3.5
Left	Richard Pitterle	7,621	4.0	▼1.3	8,234	4.4	▼1.7
FDP	Florian Toncar	6,501	3.4	▼9.6	13,516	7.1	▼13.7
AfD					9,666	5.1	
Pirates	Hagen Stanek	4,482	2.4	▲0.8	4,133	2.2	▲0.1
NPD	Bernd Geider	2,581	1.4	▼0.2	1,743	0.9	▼0.3
Tierschutzpartei					1,331	0.7	▲0.1
FW	Hasso Kraus	2,425	1.3		1,291	0.7	
PBC					613	0.3	▼0.3
REP					566	0.3	▼0.4
Volksabstimmung					546	0.2	▲0.1
ÖDP					533	0.3	0.0
RENTNER					331	0.2	
BIG					184	0.1	
MLPD	Peter Bäuerle	305	0.2	0.0	163	0.1	0.0
PRO					161	0.1	
Party of Reason					116	0.1	
BüSo					85	0.0	0.0
Informal votes		2,400			1,872		
Total valid votes		188,749			189,277		
Turnout		191,149	77.3	▲1.7			
CDU hold	Majority	57,732	30.6	▲5.5			

=== 2009 election ===
Federal election (2009): Böblingen
Notes:	Blue background denotes the winner of the electorate vote. Pink background denotes a candidate elected from their party list. Yellow background denotes an electorate win by a list member, or other incumbent. A ✓ or ✗ denotes status of any incumbent, win or lose respectively.						
Party	Candidate	Votes	%	±%	Party votes	%	±%
CDU	✓ Clemens Binninger	82,344	45.1	▼4.6	61,918	33.9	▼5.0
SPD	Franziska Engehausen	36,550	20.0	▼12.8	34,915	19.1	▼10.2
Greens	Florian Haßler	24,138	13.2	▲6.1	25,364	13.9	▲3.5
FDP	Florian Toncar	23,717	13.0	▲8.0	38,125	20.9	▲6.9
Left	Richard Pitterle	9,657	5.3	▲2.8	11,118	6.1	▲3.0
NPD	Janus Nowak	2,914	1.6	▲0.1	2,265	1.2	▲0.2
Pirates	Thomas Melchinger	2,798	1.5		3,861	2.1	
REP					1,273	0.7	▼0.4
Tierschutzpartei					1,089	0.6	
PBC					1,085	0.6	▼0.3
ÖDP					552	0.3	
DIE VIOLETTEN					356	0.2	
Volksabstimmung					346	0.2	
MLPD	Peter Bäuerle	328	0.2	▼0.1	197	0.1	0.0
DVU					88	0.0	
BüSo					68	0.0	0.0
ADM					49	0.0	
Informal votes		2,730			2,507		
Total valid votes		182,446			182,669		
Turnout		185,176	75.6	▼6.0			
CDU hold	Majority	45,794	25.1	▲8.2			

=== 2005 election ===
Federal election (2005): Böblingen
Notes:	Blue background denotes the winner of the electorate vote. Pink background denotes a candidate elected from their party list. Yellow background denotes an electorate win by a list member, or other incumbent. A ✓ or ✗ denotes status of any incumbent, win or lose respectively.						
Party	Candidate	Votes	%	±%	Party votes	%	±%
CDU	✓ Clemens Binninger	96,605	49.8	▲3.0	75,622	38.9	▼3.1
SPD	Helmut Roth	63,778	32.9	▼2.9	56,981	29.3	▼3.8
Greens	Anngret Stötzer-Rapp	13,908	7.2	▼9.3	20,247	10.4	▼1.0
FDP	Florian Toncar	9,621	5.0	▼0.48	27,128	14.0	▲5.2
Left	Matthias Reinke	4,791	2.5	▲1.5	5,916	3.0	▼2.2
NPD	Klemens Lockfisch	2,866	1.5		2,003	1.0	▲0.8
REP					2,068	1.1	0.0
PBC	Gerhard Koch	2,058	1.1	▼0.1	1,671	0.9	0.0
Familie					1,153	0.6	
GRAUEN					894	0.5	▲0.3
MLPD	Peter Bäuerle	452	0.2		296	0.2	
BüSo					129	0.1	
Informal votes		2,690			2,571		
Total valid votes		194,079			194,198		
Turnout		196,769	81.6	▼1.8			
CDU hold	Majority	32,827	16.9				
