= Quinsac, Gironde =

Quinsac
- Commune
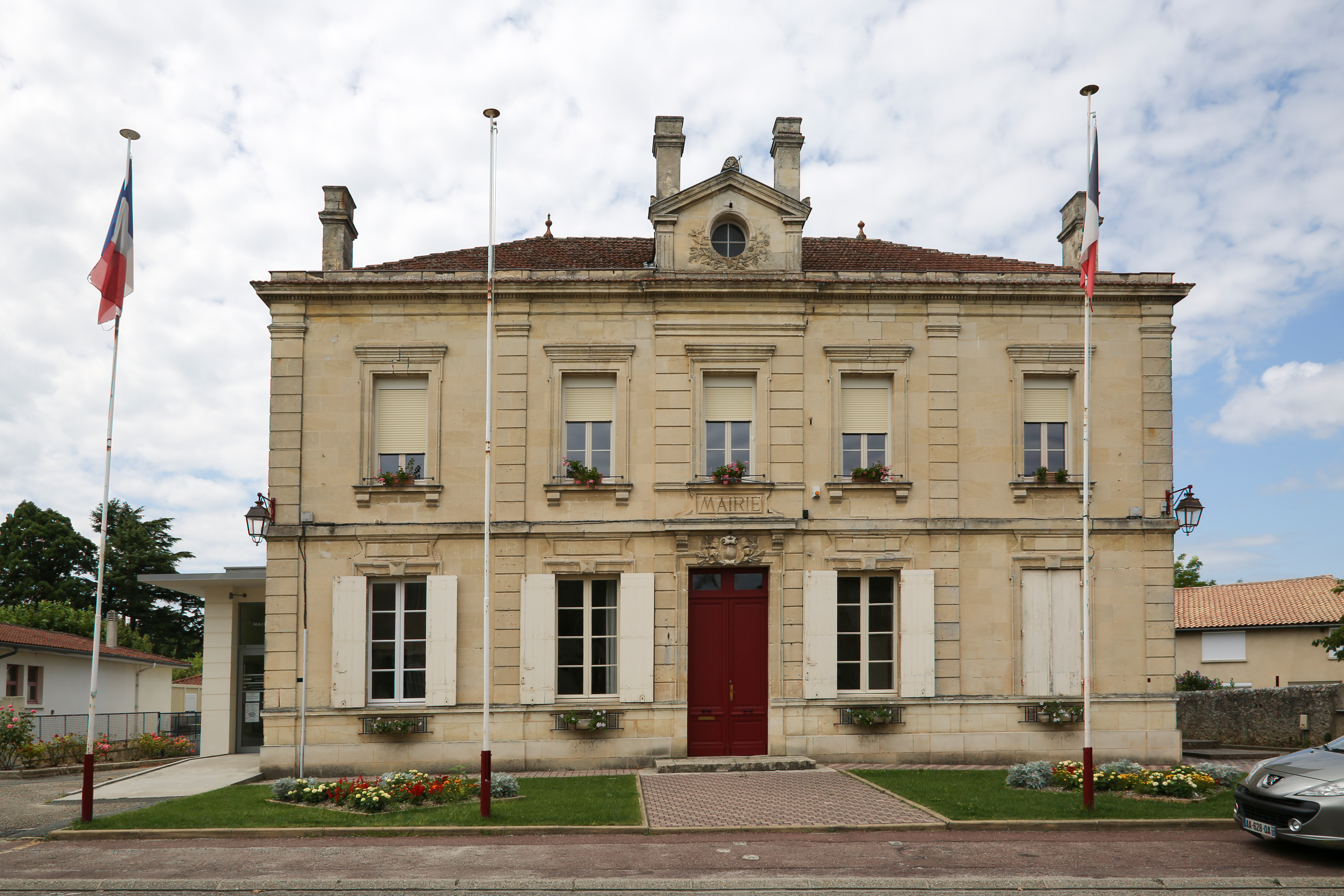
- The town hall in Quinsac

- Coat of arms
- Location of Quinsac
- Location within France Location within Nouvelle-Aquitaine
- Coordinates: 44°45′22″N 0°29′12″W
- Country: France
- Region: Nouvelle-Aquitaine
- Department: Gironde
- Arrondissement: Bordeaux
- Canton: Créon
- Intercommunality: Portes de l'Entre Deux Mers

Government
  - Mayor (2020–2026): Lionel Faye
- Area^{1}: 8.14 km^{2} (3.14 sq mi)
- Elevation: 65 m (213 ft)
- Highest elevation: 86 m (282 ft)
- Lowest elevation: 2 m (6.6 ft)
- Population (2023): 2,217
  - Density: 272/km^{2} (705/sq mi)
- Time zone: UTC+01:00 (CET)
  - Summer (DST): UTC+02:00 (CEST)
- INSEE/Postal code: 33349 /33360
- ^{1} French Land Register data, which excludes lakes, ponds, glaciers > 1 km^{2} (0.386 sq mi or 247 acres) and river estuaries.

Quinsac (French pronunciation: [kɛ̃sak]; gascon occitan : Quinçac) is a commune in the Gironde department in Nouvelle-Aquitaine in southwestern France.

Quinsac is located on the east bank of the Garonne River, 10 kilometres south of Bordeaux. The commune includes the river island of Île de la Lande.

== Population ==
Historical population

Year	Pop.	±% p.a.
1793	1,105	—
1821	917	−0.66%
1846	1,073	+0.63%
1872	1,218	+0.49%
1901	1,195	−0.07%
1926	940	−0.96%
1946	884	−0.31%
1962	1,239	+2.13%
1968	1,422	+2.32%

Year	Pop.	±% p.a.
1975	1,527	+1.02%
1982	1,829	+2.61%
1990	1,866	+0.25%
1999	1,764	−0.62%
2007	1,950	+1.26%
2012	2,115	+1.64%
2017	2,189	+0.69%
2023	2,217	+0.21%

Source: EHESS and INSEE (1968-2023)

== International relations ==
Quinsac is twinned with:

- Steinenbronn - Germany
- Le Roeulx - Belgium
- Polla - Italy

== See also ==
- Communes of the Gironde department
