= Tobias Bacherle =

German Green Party politician

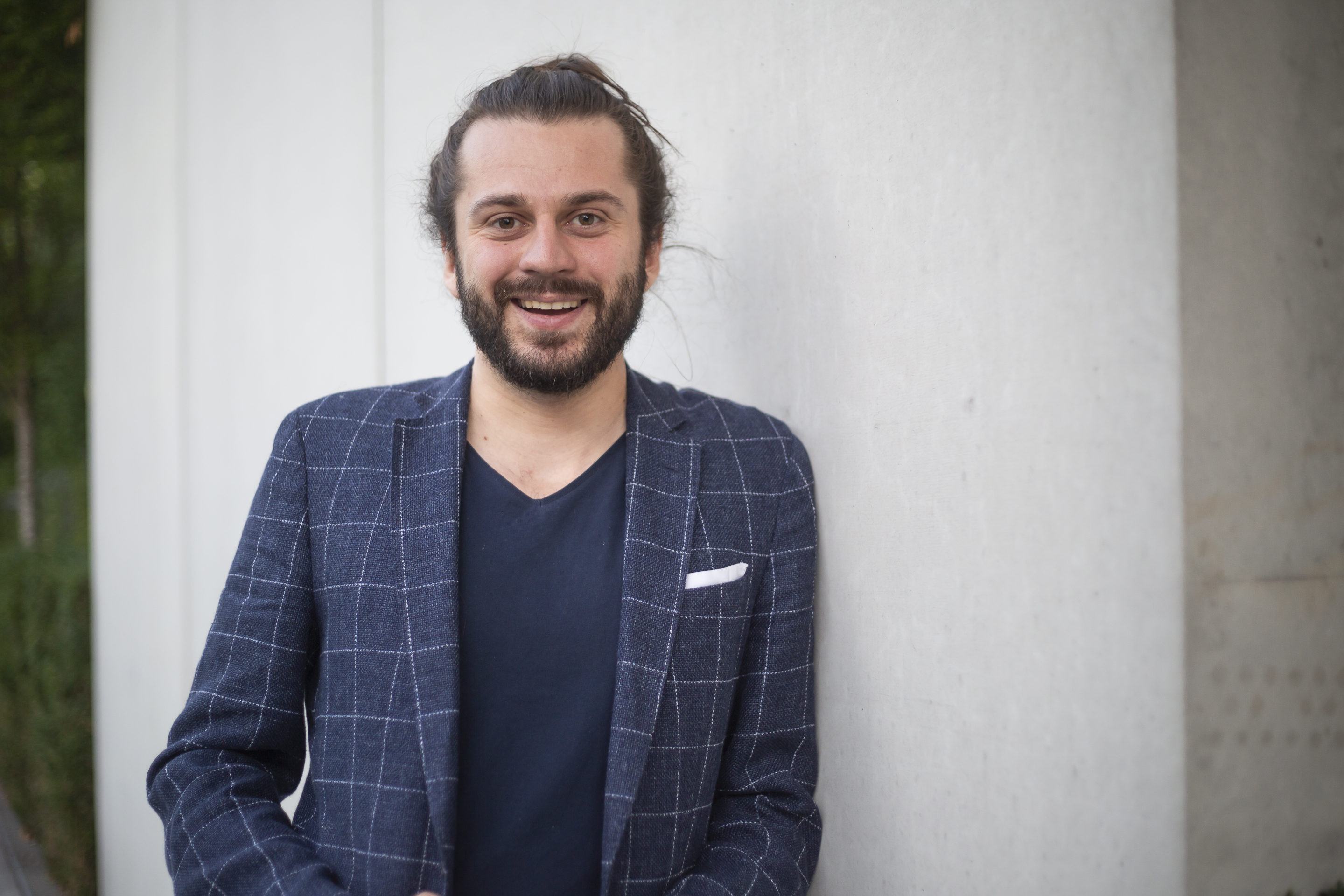
- Bacherle in 2021

Member of the Bundestag
- In office 2021–2025

Personal details
- Born: 18 October 1994 (age 32) Herrenberg, Germany
- Party: Alliance 90/The Greens

Tobias Björn Bacherle (born 18 October 1994) is a German politician who represented the Alliance 90/The Greens party from 2021 to 2025. He was elected to the Bundestag in the 2021 German federal election. He lost his seat at the 2025 German federal election and was succeeded by Marc Biadacz.

== Life and education ==
Born in Herrenberg, Bacherle grew up in Sindelfingen. After passing the Abitur school leavers' exam in 2013 at Gymnasium in den Pfarrwiesen, he attended the University of Tübingen, where he studied political science, taking minors in Islamic studies, languages, history and culture of the Middle East, as well as media science.

Before his election to the Bundestag, Bacherle worked as a political advisor to the MEP Michael Bloss.

He is the co-founder of the voluntary organisation Dit is schade, which aims to promote local culture in Sindelfingen.

== Political career ==
Bacherle was elected to the town council of Sindelfingen in 2014, and became the chairperson of the Alliance 90/The Greens group in 2019.

From 2014 to 2015, he was speaker for the Green Youth in the district of Böblingen, and from 2016 to 2019 a member of the executive committee of the Green Youth in Baden-Württemberg.

In the German federal elections of 2017 and 2021, Bacherle ran as a direct candidate in the electoral district of Böblingen, where he lost both times to Marc Biadacz. In 2021, however, he was elected to the Bundestag through the Baden-Württemberg party list of Alliance 90/The Greens, having been appointed 14th place. He lost his seat in the 2025 federal election, having again been defeated by Marc Biadacz in the Böblingen constituency and failing to secure re-election via the Baden-Württemberg state list, where he had been placed 14th.

In addition to his assignments in the committee of Foreign Affairs (Auswärtiger Ausschuss) and the committee for Digital Affairs, where he served as coordinator for his group. Bacherle was vice-chair of the German Parliamentary Friendship Group for Relations with the Maghreb States and member of the NATO Parliamentary Assembly, as well as the Parliamentary Assembly of the Union for the Mediterranean.
