= Pont Neuf, Toulouse =

Bridge in Toulouse, France

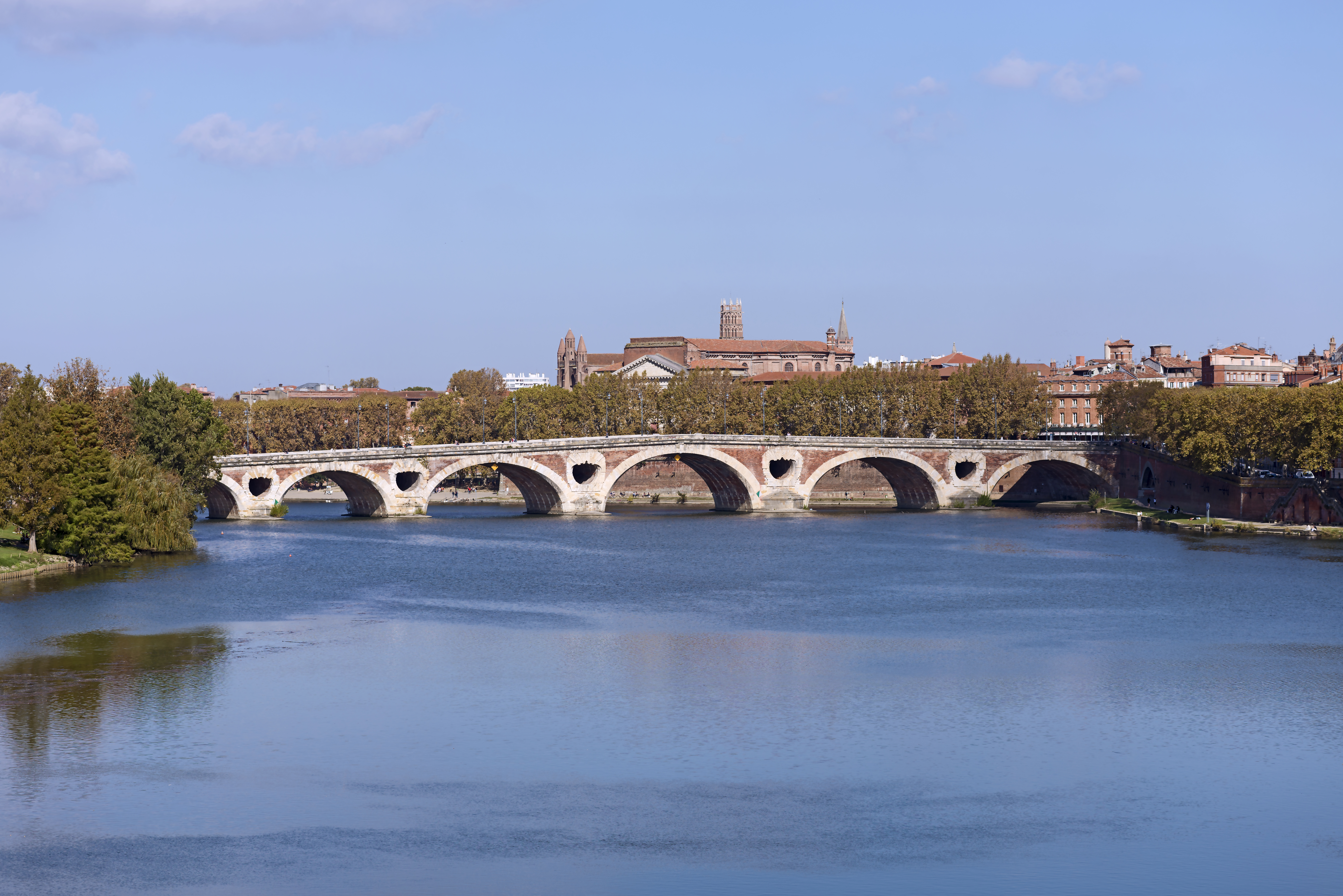
- Pont Neuf, Toulouse
- Coordinates: 43.599307°N 1.438724°E
- Crosses: Garonne
- Locale: Toulouse
- Official name: Pont de Pierre

Characteristics
- Design: arch bridge
- Material: Stone
- Longest span: approximately 30 metres (98 ft)
- No. of spans: 7

History
- Designer: Jacques Le Mercier (Lemercier); Pierre Souffron
- Construction start: 1544
- Construction end: 1632

Location
- Interactive map of Pont Neuf, Toulouse

The Pont Neuf (French pronunciation: [pɔ̃ nœf]), French for "New Bridge" (Occitan: Pont Nòu) (a.k.a. Pont de Pierre [pɔ̃ də pjɛʁ] and Grand Pont [ɡʁɑ̃ pɔ̃]; Pont de Pedra, Gran Pont), is a bridge from the 16th and 17th centuries in Toulouse, in the South of France.

Begun in 1544 and completed in 1632, its construction was made particularly long and difficult by the violent floods of the Garonne and the unstable nature of the subsoil. The architect Jacques Lemercier, who carried out the work at the beginning of the 17th century, made it an innovative bridge for its time.

== Construction ==
Envisaged by the capitouls (the consuls at the head of the city) at the end of the 15th century, the decision to build a large bridge over the Garonne in Toulouse was pushed by King Francis I, who saw a strategic interest in it in the face of the then threatening Spain of Charles V.

The Pont Neuf in Toulouse is considered a masterpiece of the Renaissance and early 17th century. Started in the 16th century by Toulouse craftsmen, it was completed by the Parisian architect Jacques Lemercier. Along with the Pont Neuf in Paris and the Henry IV bridge in Châtellerault, the Toulouse bridge belongs to a new generation of innovative structures that were free of the houses and stores that cluttered the deck of medieval bridges. Moreover, Lemercier made a synthesis between bridges of Roman antiquity, for the use of superimposed spouts intended to spread the current and for the openings on the piers, and works of the Italian Renaissance such as the Ponte Sisto of Rome for its oculi or the Ponte Santa Trinita of Florence for its lowered arches allowing to moderate the difference in level.

Original planning for the bridge started in 1542 by the assembly of a committee of master masons and carpenters. Construction started on the foundations in 1544; the first arch was started in 1614. The bridge was finished and put into service in 1632, and was inaugurated on 19 October 1659 by king Louis XIV. The quality of its design made it the only bridge in Toulouse to withstand the terrible flood of 1875, which destroyed all the other bridges in the city (although they were more recent) as well as 1400 houses.

The bridge is not symmetrical because the left bank is several metres lower than the right bank; the longest arch is the third from the right-hand bank. The openings through the piers were originally supposed to represent the face and mane of a lion. A triumphal archway added in 1642 constricted traffic and was removed in 1860.

It is 220m long, and has 7 arches.

== Gallery ==
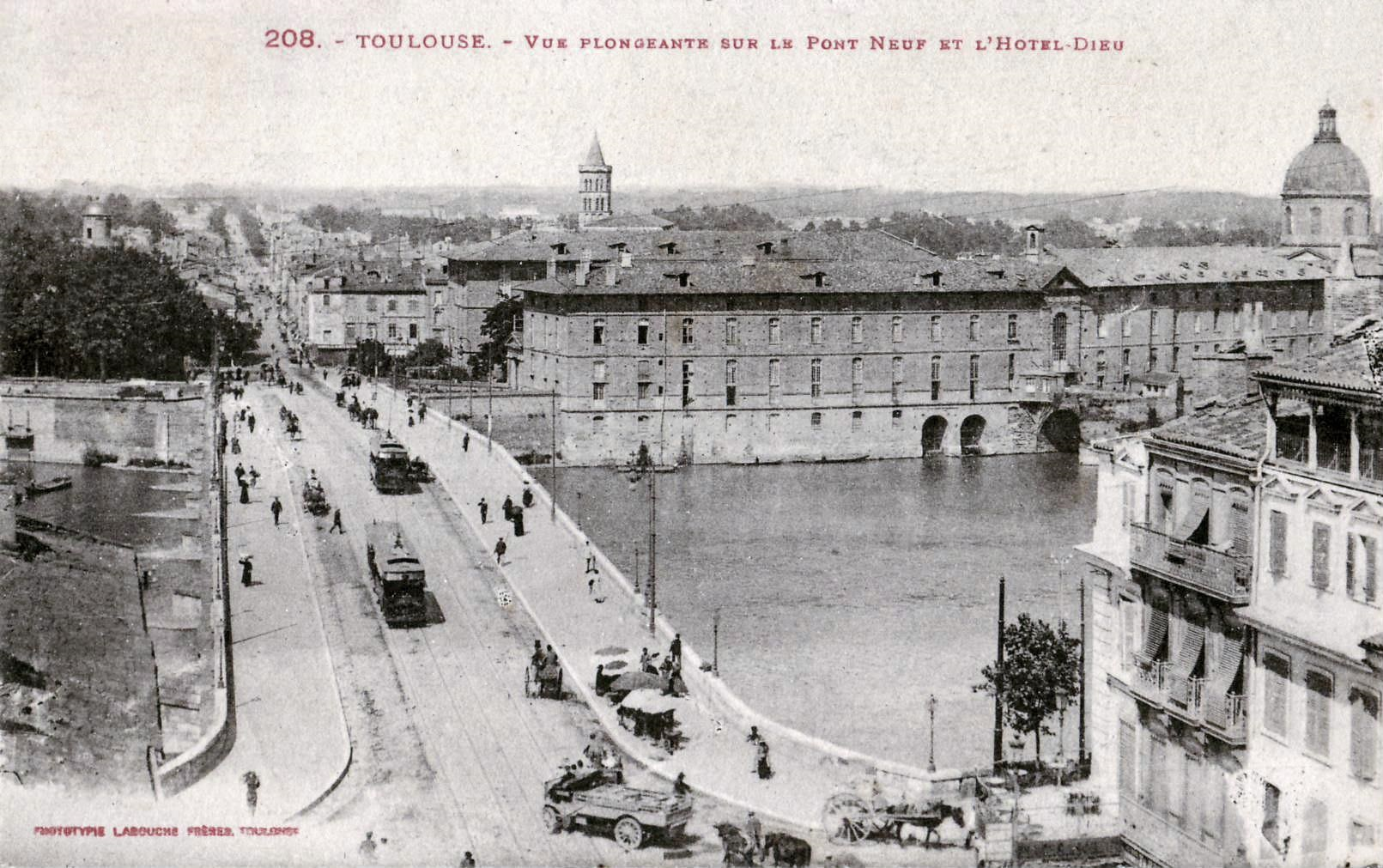
The bridge in the 1920s, with the former Toulouse tramway.

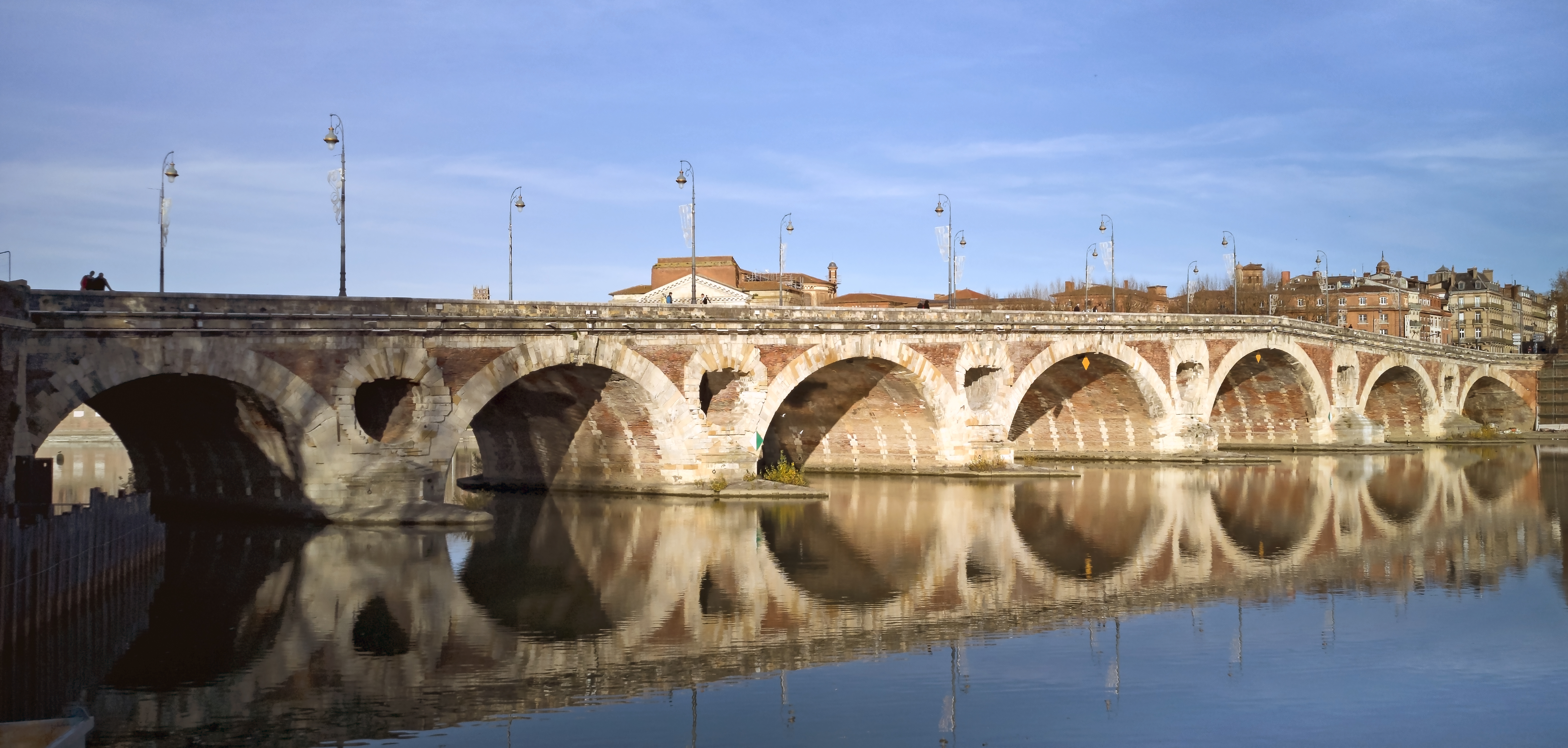
The Pont-Neuf from the left bank.

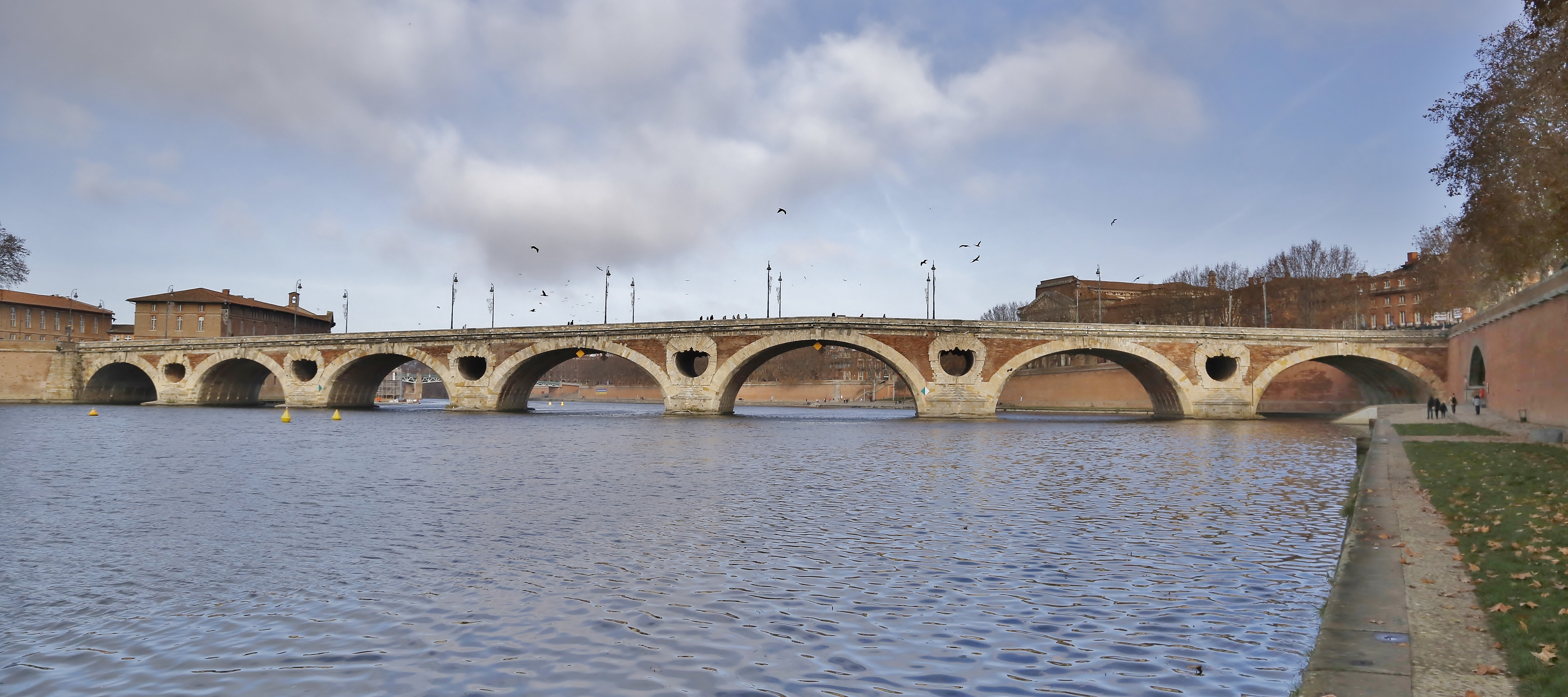
A bridge with 6 piers and 7 arches.

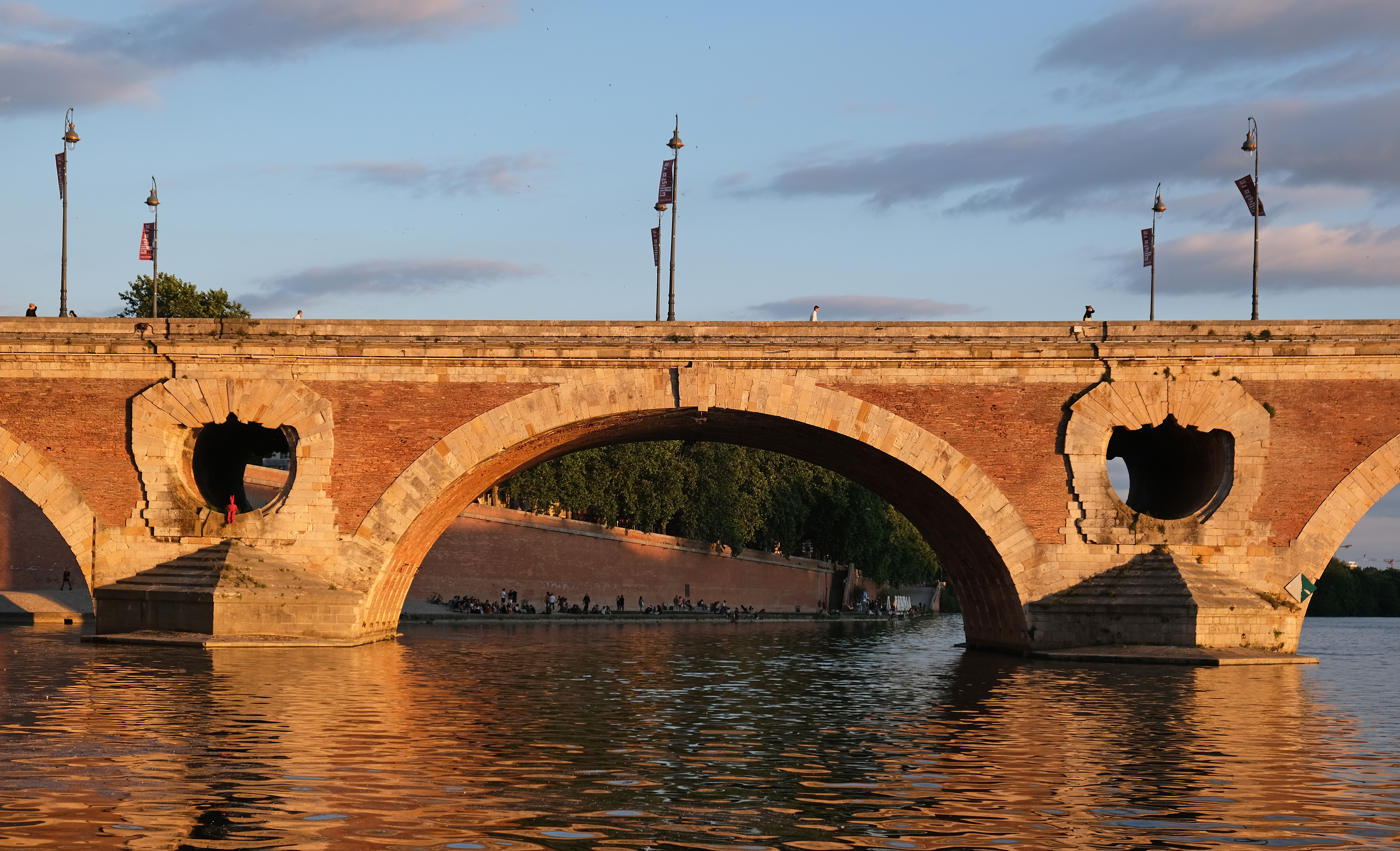
Detail of the piers and an arch.

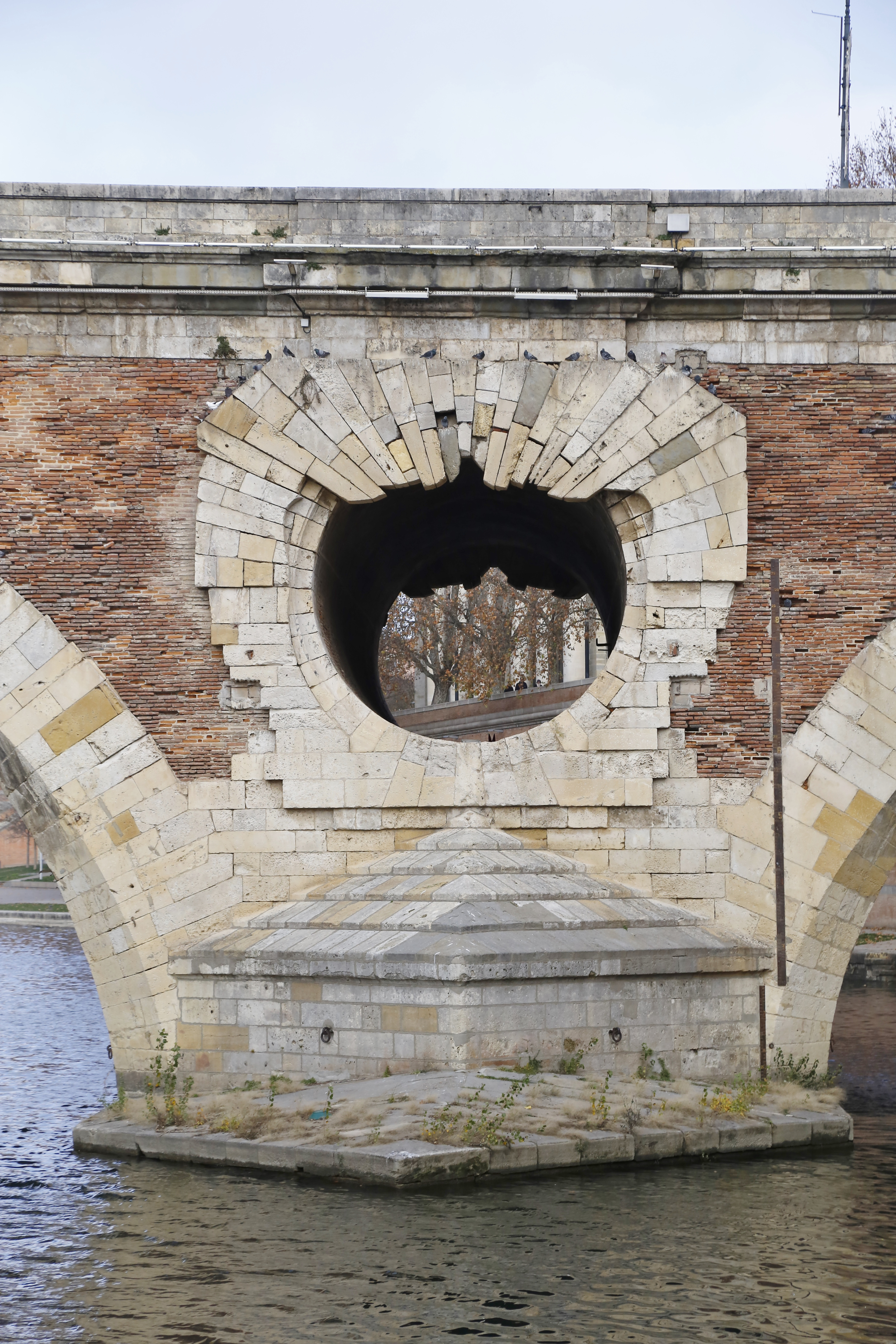
Detail of a pier with oculus and superimposed spouts.

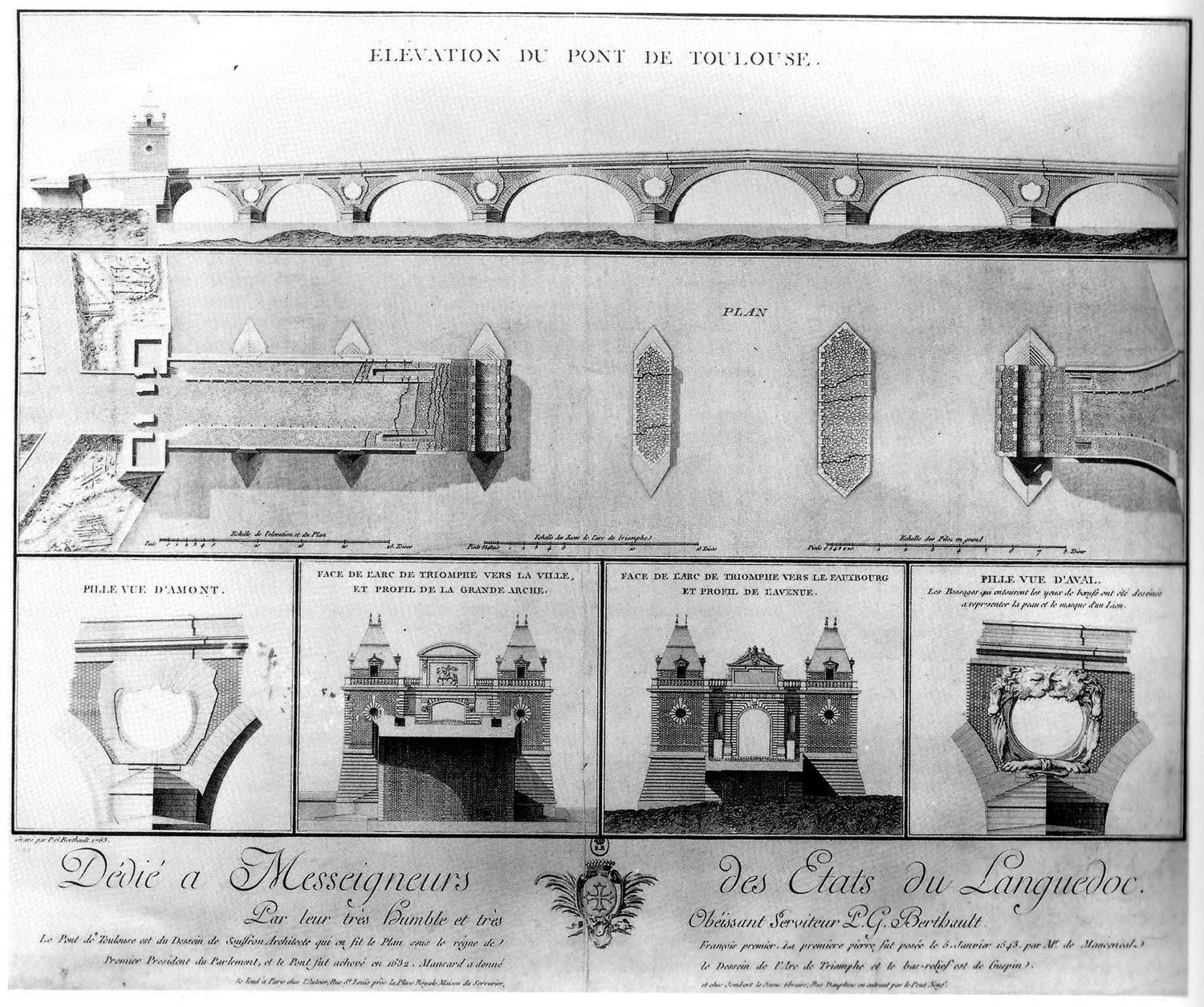
Engraving from 1783 showing the planned decorations.

== See also ==
- Renaissance architecture of Toulouse
