= Brigitte Baumeister =

German politician (born 1946)

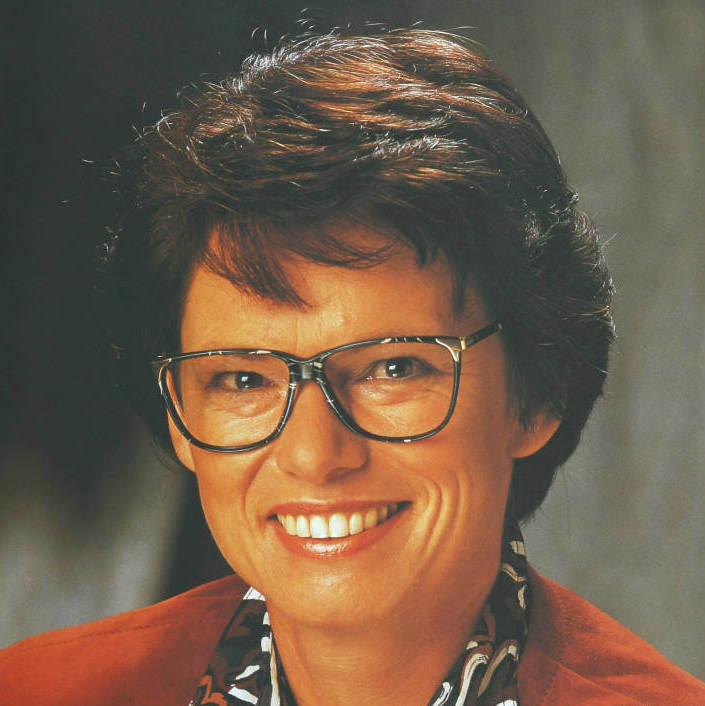
- Baumeister in 1990

Member of the Bundestag; for Böblingen
- In office 20 December 1990 – 17 October 2002
- Preceded by: Peter Petersen
- Succeeded by: Clemens Binninger

Personal details
- Born: 19 October 1946 (age 79) Stuttgart, West Germany (now Germany)
- Party: Christian Democratic Union
- Children: 2
- Education: University of Stuttgart

Brigitte Baumeister (born 19 October 1946) is a German politician (CDU) and former member of the German Bundestag.

== Life ==
She was a member of the German Bundestag from 20 December 1990 to 17 October 2002 (three terms). After studying mathematics at the University of Stuttgart, Baumeister worked for IBM Germany and was a lecturer in medical informatics at the Heilbronn University of Applied Sciences. In 1992, she replaced Walther Leisler Kiep as CDU treasurer.
