= Jasmina Hostert =

German politician (SPD)

- Born: Jasmina Pašić; 3 December 1982 (age 43); Sarajevo, Bosnia and Herzegovina
- Education: University of Bonn
- Occupation: Politician
- Political party: Social Democratic Party of Germany

Jasmina Hostert (née Pašić; born 3 December 1982) is a German politician of Bosnian descent. She is a member of the Social Democratic Party of Germany.

== Early life ==
She was born in Sarajevo, the capital of Bosnia and Herzegovina. At the beginning of the Bosnian War, she was seriously injured by a grenade in October 1992, which caused her to lose her right arm.

She fled to Germany with her father, and graduated from the University of Bonn.

In 2014, she received German citizenship.

== Early career ==
Hostert served as president of the National Paralympic Committee Germany in 2019.

== Political career ==
In the 2017 German federal election, Hostert contested the constituency of Böblingen. She contested the same constituency in 2021 and came in second place but was elected to the Bundestag on the state list. She and Adis Ahmetovic, also of the SPD, will become the first MPs of Bosnian descent.

In parliament, Hostert has since been serving on the Committee on Family Affairs, Senior Citizens, Women and Youth and the Sports Committee.

In addition to her committee assignments, Hostert is part of the German Parliamentary Friendship Group for Relations with the Northern Adriatic States.
