= Paul Bausch =

German politician (1895–1981)

Member of the Bundestag; for Böblingen
- In office 7 September 1949 – 17 October 1965
- Preceded by: Constituency established
- Succeeded by: Peter Petersen

Personal details
- Born: 27 May 1895 Korntal, Kingdom of Württemberg, German Empire
- Died: 1 September 1981 (aged 86) Korntal, Baden-Württemberg, West Germany
- Party: Christian Democratic Union

Paul Bausch (27 May 1895 – 1 September 1981) was a German politician of the Christian Democratic Union (CDU) and former member of the German Bundestag.

== Life ==
In 1924 Bausch was co-founder of the Protestant-Conservative Christian People's Service, which was merged into the Christian Social People's Service in 1929. In 1945 Bausch was one of the co-founders of the CDU in Württemberg-Baden and became a member of the CDU state executive there. He was one of the advocates of an interdenominational party foundation, which wanted to abolish the political division between Protestants and Catholics. From 1946 to 1950 Bausch was a member of the state parliament in Württemberg-Baden. From 1947 to 1949 he was a member of the state council of the American zone. He had been a member of the German Bundestag since the first Bundestag elections in 1949 to 1965, representing the constituency of Böblingen in parliament. From 1953 to 1957 he was chairman of the Bundestag committee for press, radio and film issues. In 1951, together with Willi Steinhörster (SPD), Bausch secured institutional support for the "Bund für Vogelschutz" (now NABU) from the federal budget.

== Literature ==
Herbst, Ludolf; Jahn, Bruno (2002). Vierhaus, Rudolf (ed.). Biographisches Handbuch der Mitglieder des Deutschen Bundestages. 1949–2002 [Biographical Handbook of the Members of the German Bundestag. 1949–2002] (in German). München: De Gruyter - De Gruyter Saur. p. 1715. ISBN 978-3-11-184511-1.
