= Île de la Lande =

Island in France

Coordinates: 44°44′40″N 0°30′25″W

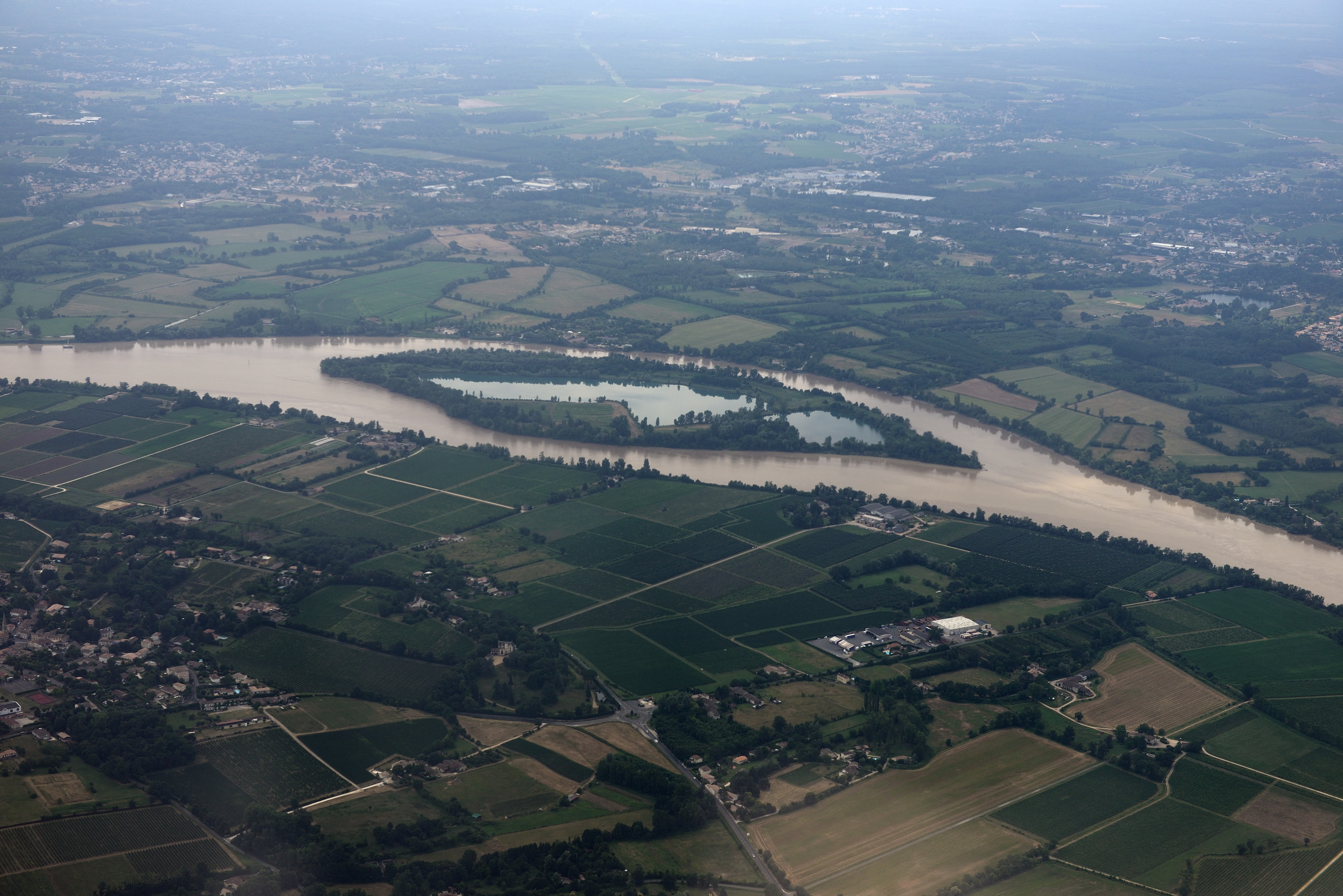
Île de la Lande viewed from the northeast

Île de la Lande is an island in France's Garonne River, located 10 kilometres (6.2 mi) south (upstream) from Bordeaux, close to the town of Cadaujac. It lies within the commune of Quinsac.

The island is 1.5 kilometres (0.93 mi) in length and features a large central lake.

The island is owned by the Cathiard family, and contains the ruins of a château.
