= Clemens Binninger =

German politician of the CDU

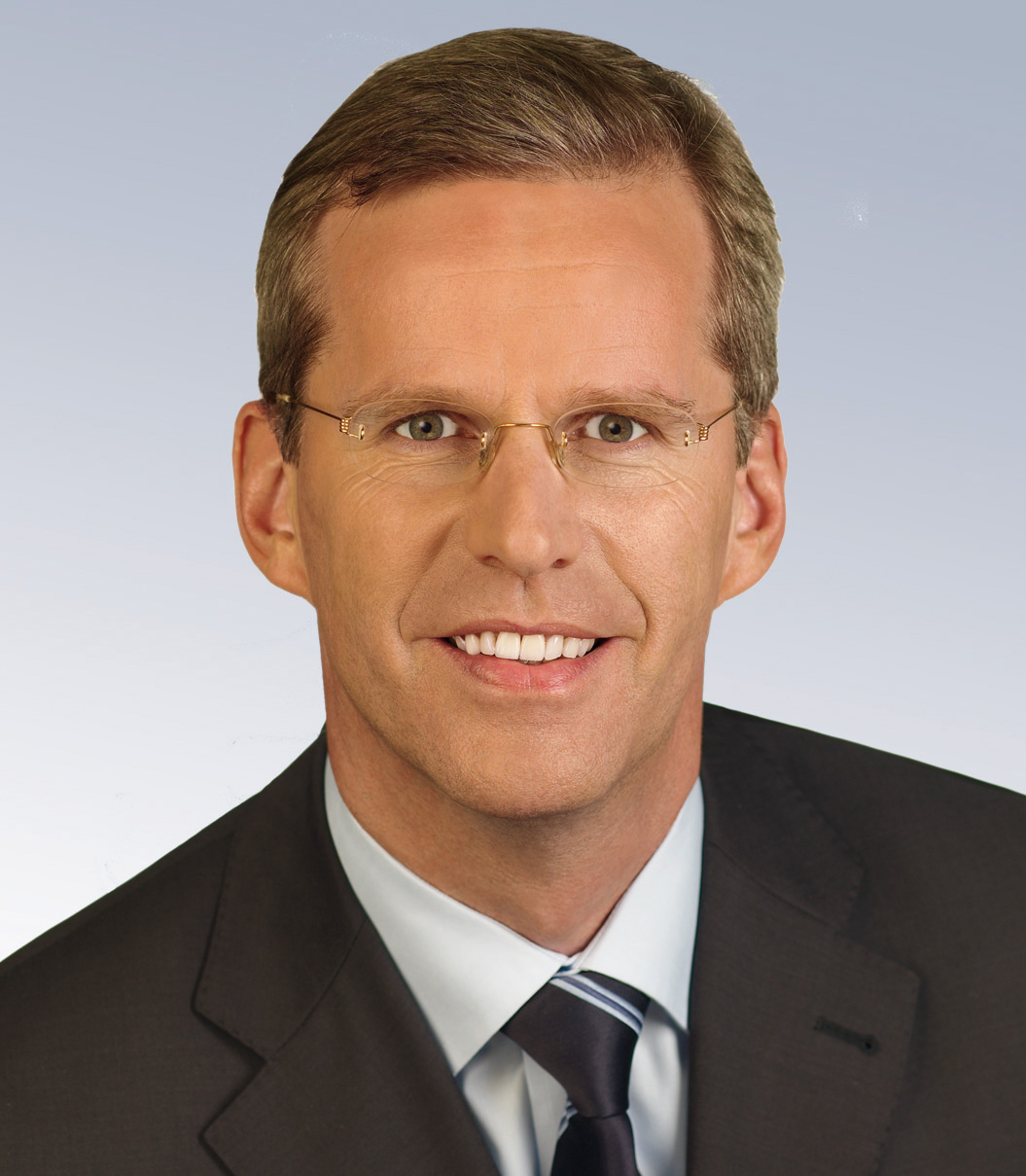
- Binninger in 2010

Member of the Bundestag; for Böblingen
- In office 17 October 2002 – 24 October 2017
- Preceded by: Brigitte Baumeister
- Succeeded by: Marc Biadacz

Personal details
- Born: 24 April 1962 (age 64) Bonndorf, Baden-Württemberg, West Germany
- Citizenship: German
- Party: Christian Democratic Union
- Education: Hochschule für Polizei Baden-Württemberg (HfPolBW); Deutsche Hochschule der Polizei (DHPOL)
- Occupation: Politician

Clemens Binninger (born 24 April 1962) is a German politician of the CDU (conservative party). Binninger was a member of the Bundestag from 2002 until 2017.

== Political career ==
Binninger was first elected in the 2002 elections and then re-elected in 2005, 2009 and 2013, representing the electoral district of Böblingen. Before becoming member of the German Parliament, he used to work in police services and also as head of division in the State Ministry of the Interior of Baden-Württemberg.

Binninger was a full member of the Committee of Internal Affairs and deputy chairman of the Parliamentary Oversight Panel (PKGr), which provides parliamentary oversight of Germany’s intelligence services BND, BfV and MAD. In April 2014, he briefly served as head of the German Parliamentary Committee investigating the NSA spying scandal but stepped down after six days. He was also a member of the German-Israeli Parliamentary Friendship Group.

In addition, Binninger is a member of the International Police Association (IPA) and the German-American-center/James F. Byrnes Institute Stuttgart. He was rewarded for special accomplishments in constitutional law.

In September 2016, Binninger announced that he would not stand in the 2017 federal elections but instead resign from active politics by the end of the parliamentary term.

== Political positions ==
When German Interior Minister Wolfgang Schäuble announced plans in 2008 to set up a central communications monitoring agency in Cologne for use by the police and intelligence agencies, modeled after the US's NSA and the UK's GCHQ, Binninger publicly expressed his support for the proposal, calling it "an ideal concentration of know-how." In late 2016, Binninger was one of the driving forces behind a long-delayed reform package for Germany's BND, allowing for interception of communications of foreign entities and individuals on German soil and abroad which pass through the Deutscher Commercial Internet Exchange (DE-CIX) in Frankfurt.

In April 2014, the Left Party and the Greens sought to petition for a subpoena to Edward Snowden in the very first session of the German Parliamentary Committee investigating the NSA spying scandal, but Binninger's CDU/CSU parliamentary group rejected the move. Indeed, Binninger unexpectedly resigned in response, saying that he stepped down to protest opposition efforts to turn the committee into a "Snowden circus." In his statement, Binninger said that Snowden was not of particular interest as a witness.

== Life after politics ==
After leaving active politics, Binninger and his wife Ulrike founded Binninger & Binninger, a consulting firm. In addition, he has been serving affiliate of the Digital Society Institute (DSI) at the European School of Management and Technology.

== Other activities ==
- Research Forum on Public Safety at the Free University of Berlin, Member of the Steering Committee
- Federal Agency for Technical Relief (THW), Baden-Württemberg chapter, President (2006-2015)
- International Police Association (IPA), Member
- German European Security Association (GESA), Member of the Executive Board (2009–2013)
- Federal Academy for Security Policy (BAKS), Member of the Advisory Board (2005–2012)
