= Aigualluts =

Coordinates: 42°40′05″N 0°39′57″E

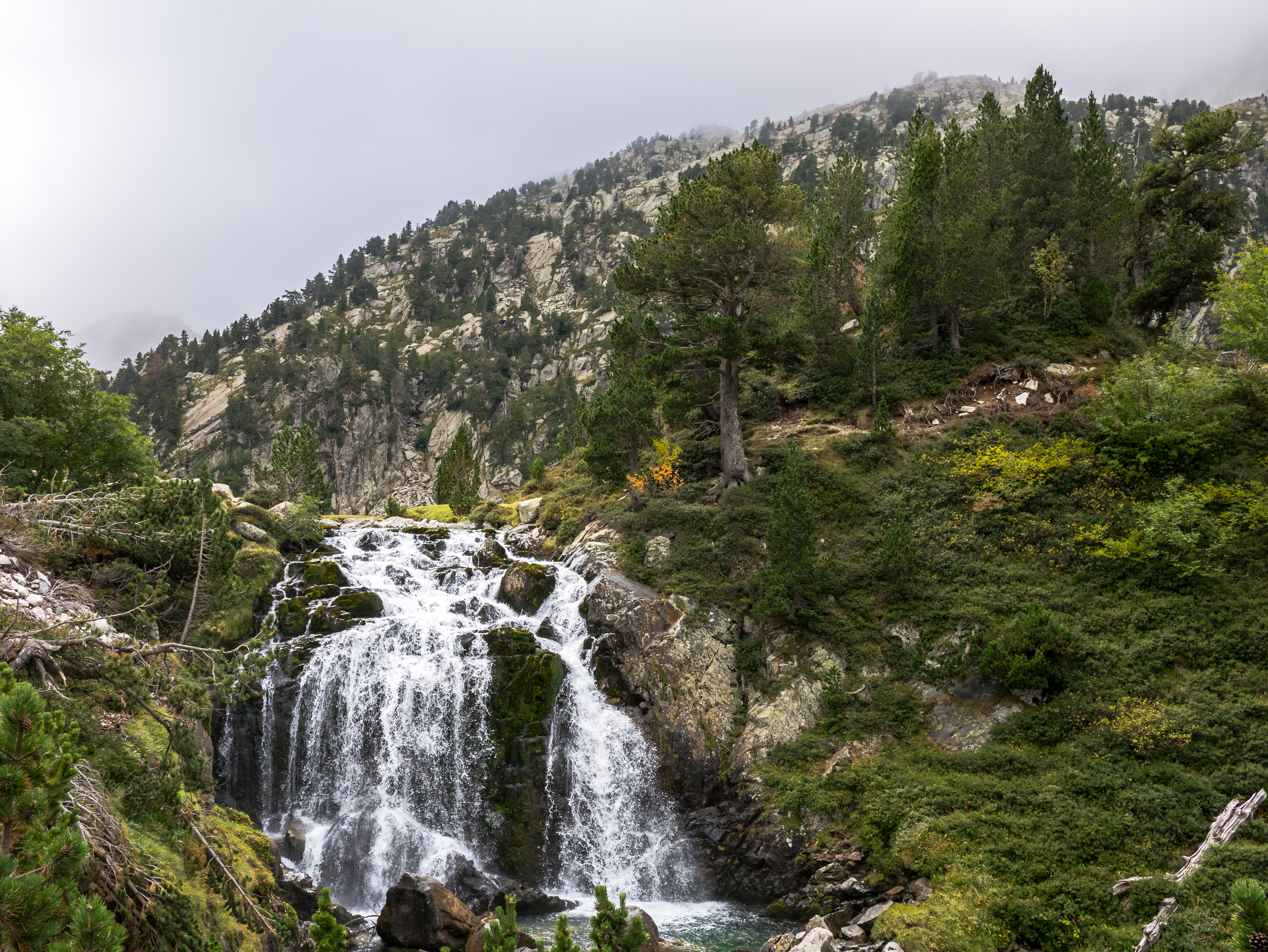
Aigualluts waterfall.

The Forau d'Aigualluts is a karst formation and waterfall in the Province of Huesca, northeastern Spain. It lies along the Ésera River, at 2074 m above sea level on Pico Aneto.

== Description ==
The Forau de Aiguallut is a chasm through which the waters from the Aneto glacier disappear to resurface again in the Val d'Aran, in the Garonne river basin, which flows into the Atlantic Sea in the French city of Bordeaux. Before its disappearance, the waters coming from the Aneto glacier flow into the great meadow of the Plan d’Aigualluts, where it meanders in small meanders until it falls through the colorful Aiguallut waterfall which flows directly into the great chasm of Aiguallut.
