= Florian Toncar =

German politician (born 1979)

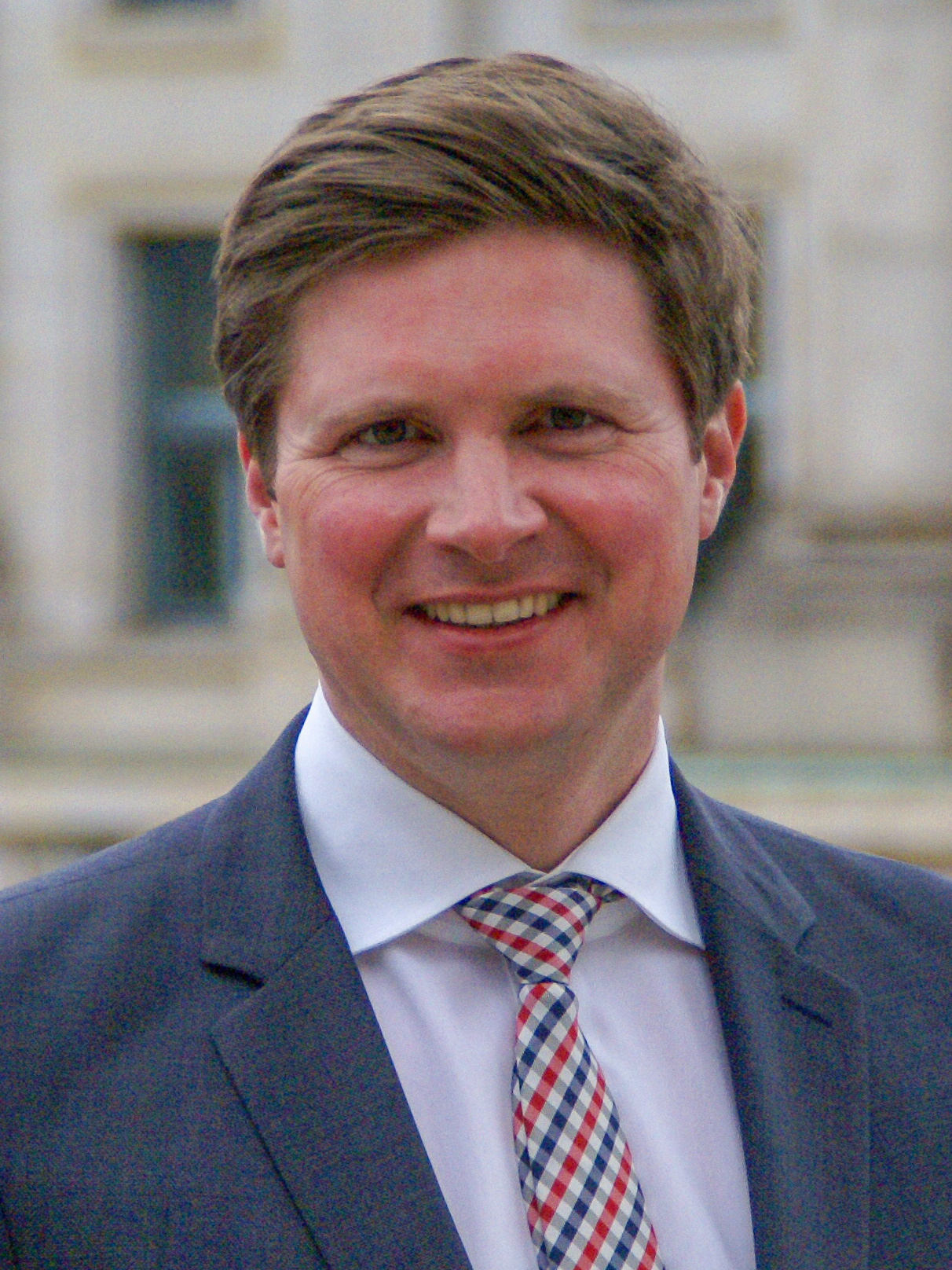
- Toncar in 2019

Member of the Bundestag
- In office 2017–2025
- In office 2005–2013

Personal details
- Born: 18 October 1979 (age 47) Hamburg, West Germany (now Germany)
- Party: FDP
- Children: 3
- Education: University of Regensburg; University of Cambridge; University of Heidelberg

Florian Toncar (born 18 October 1979) is a German lawyer and politician of the Free Democratic Party (FDP). He has served as a member of the Bundestag from the state of Baden-Württemberg from 2005 to 2013 and again from 2017 to 2025. He served as Parliamentary State Secretary in the Federal Ministry of Finance in the coalition government of Chancellor Olaf Scholz from 2021 until November 2024.

== Early life and education ==
After graduating from high school in 1999 at the Goldberg Gymnasium in Sindelfingen, Toncar first did his military service in the 220 communications regiment in Donauwörth and studied law in Regensburg from 2000. From 2002 to 2003 Toncar studied in Cambridge, then in Heidelberg. After passing the First State Examination in 2005 and completing his legal clerkship at Stuttgart District Court, he passed the Second State Examination in 2007.

== Career ==
Since 2009 Toncar has been a lawyer specializing in banking and financial supervision.

=== Member of the German Parliament, 2005–2013 ===
Toncar first served as a member of the Bundestag from 2005 until 2013, representing the Böblingen district. In parliament, he served on the Committee on Human Rights and Humanitarian Aid (2005-2009) and the Budget Committee (2009-2013). On the Budget Committee, he served as his parliamentary group's rapporteur on the annual budgets of the Federal Ministry of the Interior; the Federal Ministry of Family Affairs, Senior Citizens, Women and Youth; the Federal Ministry of Justice; and the Federal Constitutional Court. In addition to his committee assignments, he was part of the German-Israeli Parliamentary Friendship Group.

From 2008 to 2010, Toncar was a member of the parliamentary body providing oversight of the Special Financial Market Stabilization Funds (SoFFin).

In the negotiations to form a coalition government of the FDP and the Christian Democrats (CDU together with the Bavarian CSU) following the 2009 federal elections, Toncar was part of the FDP delegation in the working group on foreign affairs, defense, Europe and development policy, led by Franz Josef Jung and Werner Hoyer.

From 2011 until 2013, Toncar served as one of his parliamentary group's deputy chairpersons, under the leadership of chairman Rainer Brüderle.

=== Career in the private sector ===
When the FDP failed to re-enter the German Bundestag in the 2013 elections, Toncar returned to the private sector and worked for the Frankfurt office of international commercial law firm Freshfields Bruckhaus Deringer from March 2014 to October 2017.

=== Member of the German Parliament, 2017–2025 ===
Toncar became a member of the Bundestag again in the 2017 German federal election. From 2017 until 2021, he served as one of three parliamentary directors of the FDP parliamentary group. In this capacity, he was a member of the parliament's Council of Elders, which – among other duties – determines daily legislative agenda items and assigns committee chairpersons based on party representation. He was also a member of the Finance Committee and served as his parliamentary group's spokesperson on financial policy. In this capacity, he was involved in the parliamentary inquiry into the Wirecard scandal from 2020 until 2021; following the inquiry's completion, he co-authored a 675-page report together with Lisa Paus and Fabio De Masi.

In 2020, Toncar joined the parliamentary body in charge of appointing judges to the Highest Courts of Justice, namely the Federal Court of Justice (BGH), the Federal Administrative Court (BVerwG), the Federal Fiscal Court (BFH), the Federal Labour Court (BAG), and the Federal Social Court (BSG).

In addition to his committee assignments, Toncar was part of the German-British Parliamentary Friendship Group.

In the negotiations to form a so-called traffic light coalition of the Social Democratic Party (SPD), the Green Party and the FDP following the 2021 federal elections, Toncar was part of his party's delegation in the working group on financial regulation and the national budget, co-chaired by Doris Ahnen, Lisa Paus and Christian Dürr.

== Other activities ==
- German Federal Cultural Foundation, Ex-Officio Member of the Board of Trustees (since 2022)
- KfW Capital, Member of the advisory board (since 2022)
