= Steinenbronn =

- Municipality
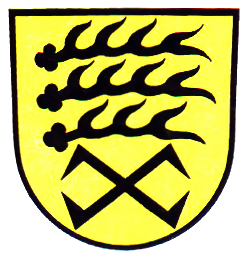
- Coat of arms

- Location of Steinenbronn within Böblingen district
- Interactive map of Steinenbronn
- Location within Germany Location within Baden-Württemberg
- Coordinates: 48°39′53″N 09°07′21″E
- Country: Germany
- State: Baden-Württemberg
- Admin. region: Stuttgart
- District: Böblingen

Government
  - Mayor (2020–28): Ronny Habakuk

Area
  - Total: 9.72 km^{2} (3.75 sq mi)
- Elevation: 431 m (1,414 ft)

Population (2025-12-31)
  - Total: 6,315
  - Density: 650/km^{2} (1,680/sq mi)
- Time zone: UTC+01:00 (CET)
  - Summer (DST): UTC+02:00 (CEST)
- Postal codes: 71144
- Dialling codes: 07157
- Vehicle registration: BB
- Website: www.steinenbronn.de

Steinenbronn (German pronunciation: [ʃtaɪ̯nənˈbʁɔn]) is a municipality in the district of Böblingen in Baden-Württemberg in Germany. The district has one public school and five kindergartens. The east side is industrial while the west side of the town is rather urban.

== Geography ==
Steinenbronn lies on the edge of the Nationalpark Schönbuch at the old trade route Stuttgart – Tübingen, five kilometers south of Leinfelden-Echterdingen, three kilometers north of Waldenbuch and five kilometers east of Schönaich.

== Politics ==
=== Mayor ===
since the end of World War II:

- 1945–1950: Gottlob Krauß
- 1950–1980: Reinhold Buck
- 1980–1996: Hermann Walz
- 1996–2020: Johann Singer
- since 2020: Ronny Habakuk

== Municipal Council ==
Elections in May 2014:

- Freie Wähler (Free voters): 5 seats
- CDU: 5 seats
- Offene Grüne Liste (Open green list): 2 seats
- SPD: 2 seats

== Infrastructure ==
From 1928 to 1965 Steinenbronn was part of the Siebenmühlentalbahn (Leinfelden-Waldenbuch). Today Steinenbronn is connected to the mass transit of Stuttgart. Steinenbronn is located at the former Bundesstraße 27, now Landstraße 1208 which connects Stuttgart and Tübingen.

important Distances:

- Stuttgart-Airport: 8 km
- Stuttgart: 20 km
- Tübingen: 24 km

== Education ==
Steinenbronn is the seat of a secondary school with more than 400 students.

== Twin towns ==
- Quinsac (France), since 1966
- Polla (Italy), since 1991
- Le Rœulx (Belgium), since 1992
- (Germany) Bernsdorf, since German reunion
