= Marc Biadacz =

German politician (born 1979)

Marc Biadacz MdB
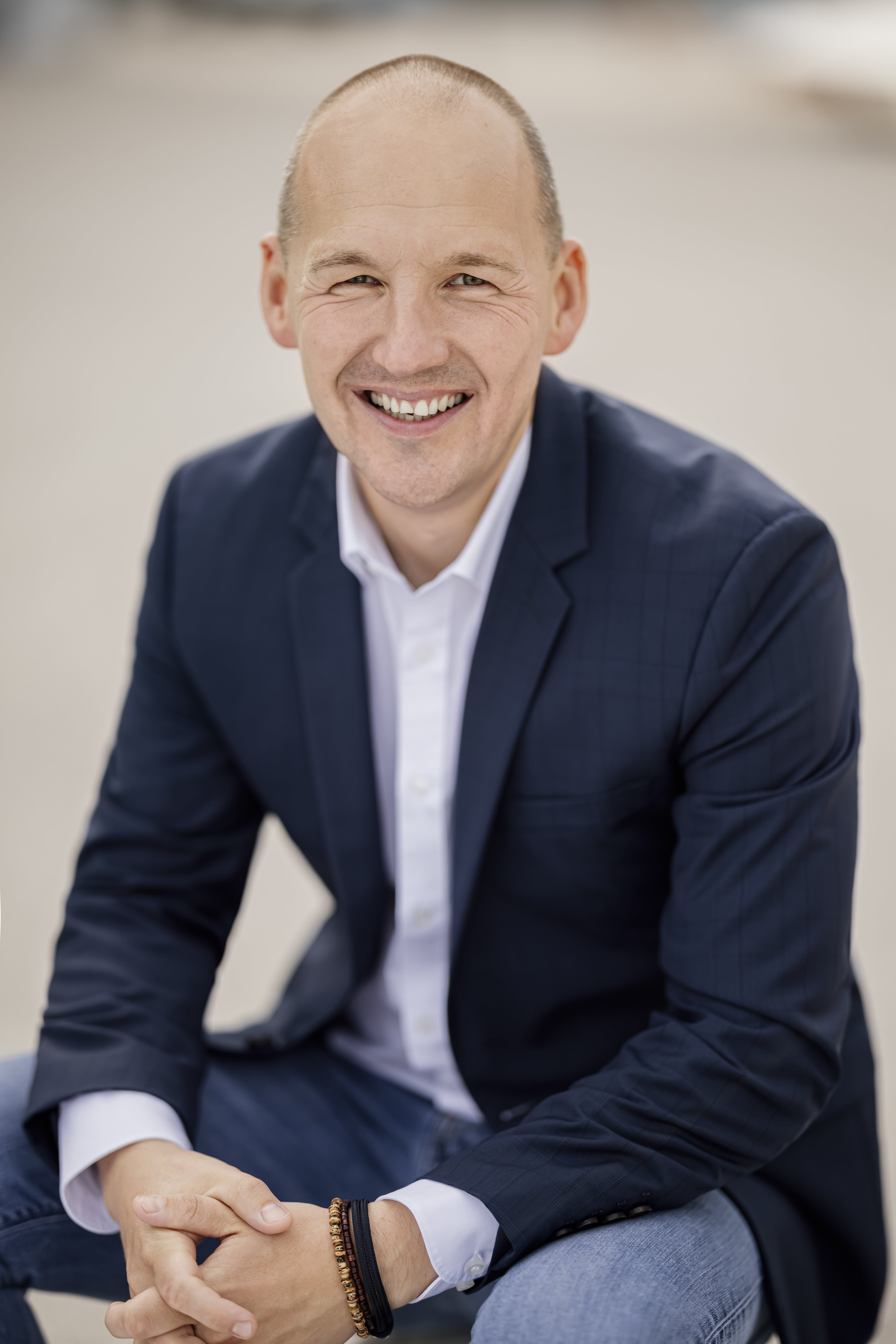
- Biadacz in 2021

Member of the Bundestag; for Böblingen
- Incumbent
- Assumed office 24 October 2017
- Preceded by: Clemens Binninger

Personal details
- Born: 3 September 1979 (age 46) Böblingen, West Germany
- Party: Christian Democratic Union
- Education: University of Stuttgart

Marc Biadacz (born 3 September 1979) is a German politician of the Christian Democratic Union (CDU) who has been serving as a member of the Bundestag from the state of Baden-Württemberg since 2017.

== Political career ==
Biadacz became a member of the Bundestag in the 2017 German federal election, representing the electoral district of Böblingen in Baden-Württemberg. In parliament, he is a member of the Committee on Petitions and the Committee on Labour and Social Affairs. In this capacity, he serves as his parliamentary group’s rapporteur on migrant workers.

== Political positions ==
Ahead of the 2021 national elections, Biadacz endorsed Markus Söder as the Christian Democrats' joint candidate to succeed Chancellor Angela Merkel.
