= Garonne =

River in France

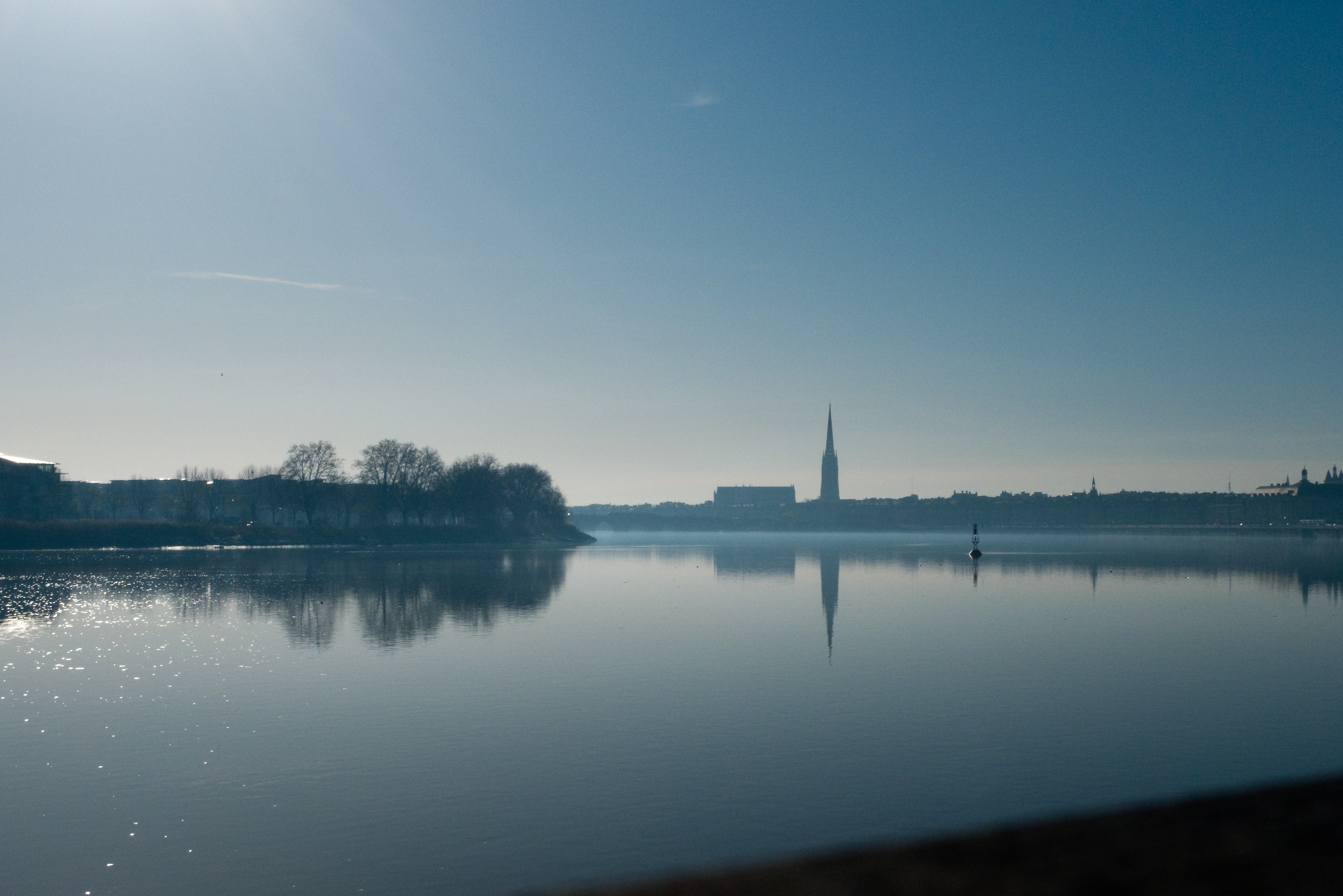
- The Garonne at Bordeaux

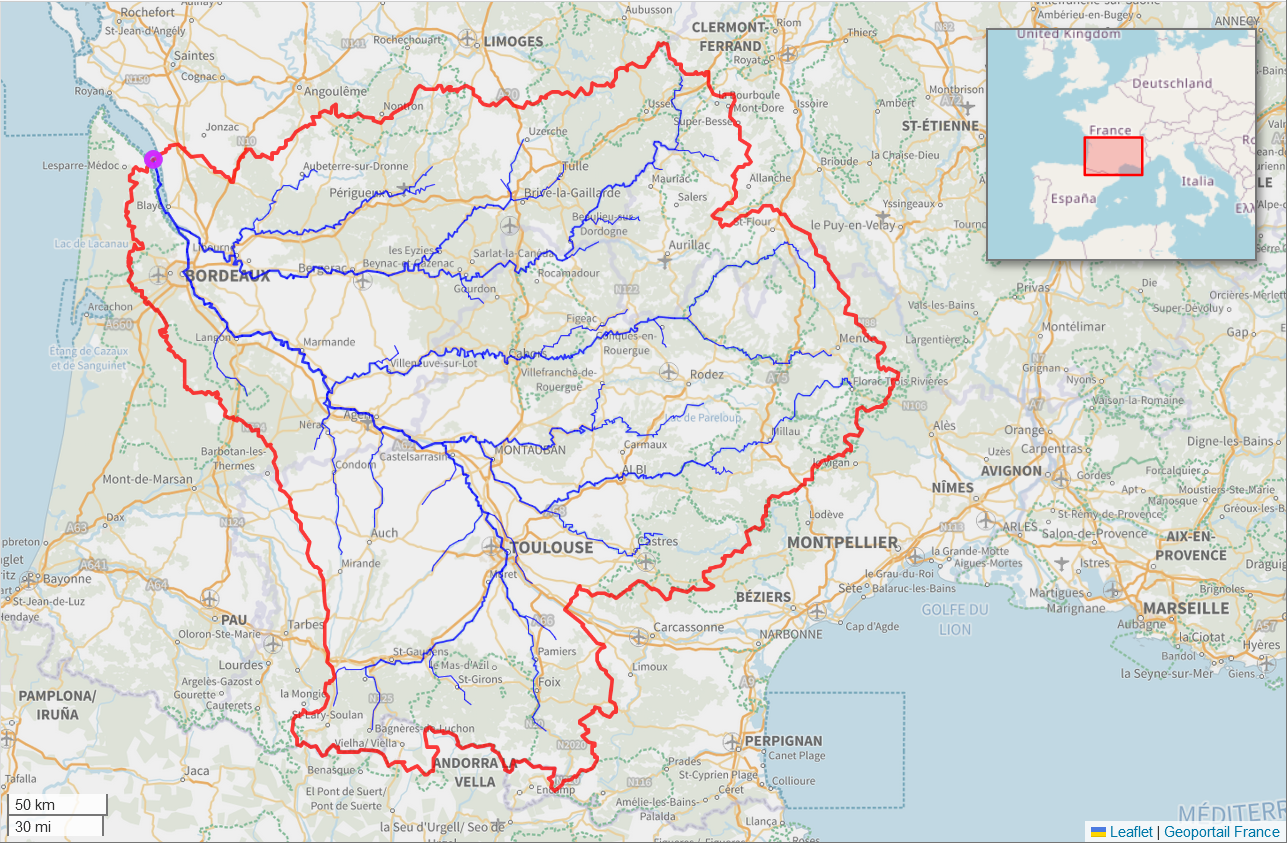
- Map of the Garonne River watershed
- Native name: Garona (Occitan)

Location
- Countries: France and Spain
- Cities: Toulouse; Bordeaux

Physical characteristics
- Source: Pyrenees
  - location: Alt Àneu, Catalonia, Spain
  - coordinates: 42°36′26″N 0°57′56″E
  - elevation: 2,600 m (8,500 ft)
- Mouth: Gironde estuary, Atlantic Ocean
  - location: Bayon-sur-Gironde, Nouvelle-Aquitaine, France
  - coordinates: 45°2′29″N 0°36′24″W
  - elevation: 0 m (0 ft)
- Length: 529 km (329 mi)
- Basin size: 56,000 km^{2} (22,000 sq mi), or including Dordogne: 84,811 km^{2} (32,746 sq mi)
- Discharge
  - average: 650 m^{3}/s (23,000 cu ft/s)

Basin features
- Progression: Gironde estuary→ Atlantic Ocean

The Garonne (/ɡəˈrɒn, ɡæˈrɒn/ gə-RON, garr-ON; French: [ɡaʁɔn]; Spanish, Catalan, Basque and Occitan: Garona, Occitan pronunciation: [ɡaˈɾunɔ]; Latin: Garumna or Garunna) is a river that flows in southwest France and northern Spain. It flows from the central Spanish Pyrenees to the Gironde estuary at the French port of Bordeaux – a length of 529 km (329 mi), of which 47 km (29 mi) is in Spain (Val d'Aran); the total length extends to 602 km (374 mi) if one includes the Gironde estuary between the river and the sea. Its basin area is 56,000 km^{2} (22,000 sq mi), which increases to 84,811 km^{2} (32,746 sq mi) if the Dordogne River, which flows from the east and joins the Garonne at Bec d'Ambès to form the Gironde estuary, is included.

Umayyad and Aquitanian forces fought the Battle of the River Garonne in 732 beside the river near present-day Bordeaux.

== Etymology ==
The name derives from Garumna, a Latinized version of the Aquitanian name meaning "stony river" ("kar" relating to "stone" and "-ona" relating to "river").

== Geography ==
=== Sources ===
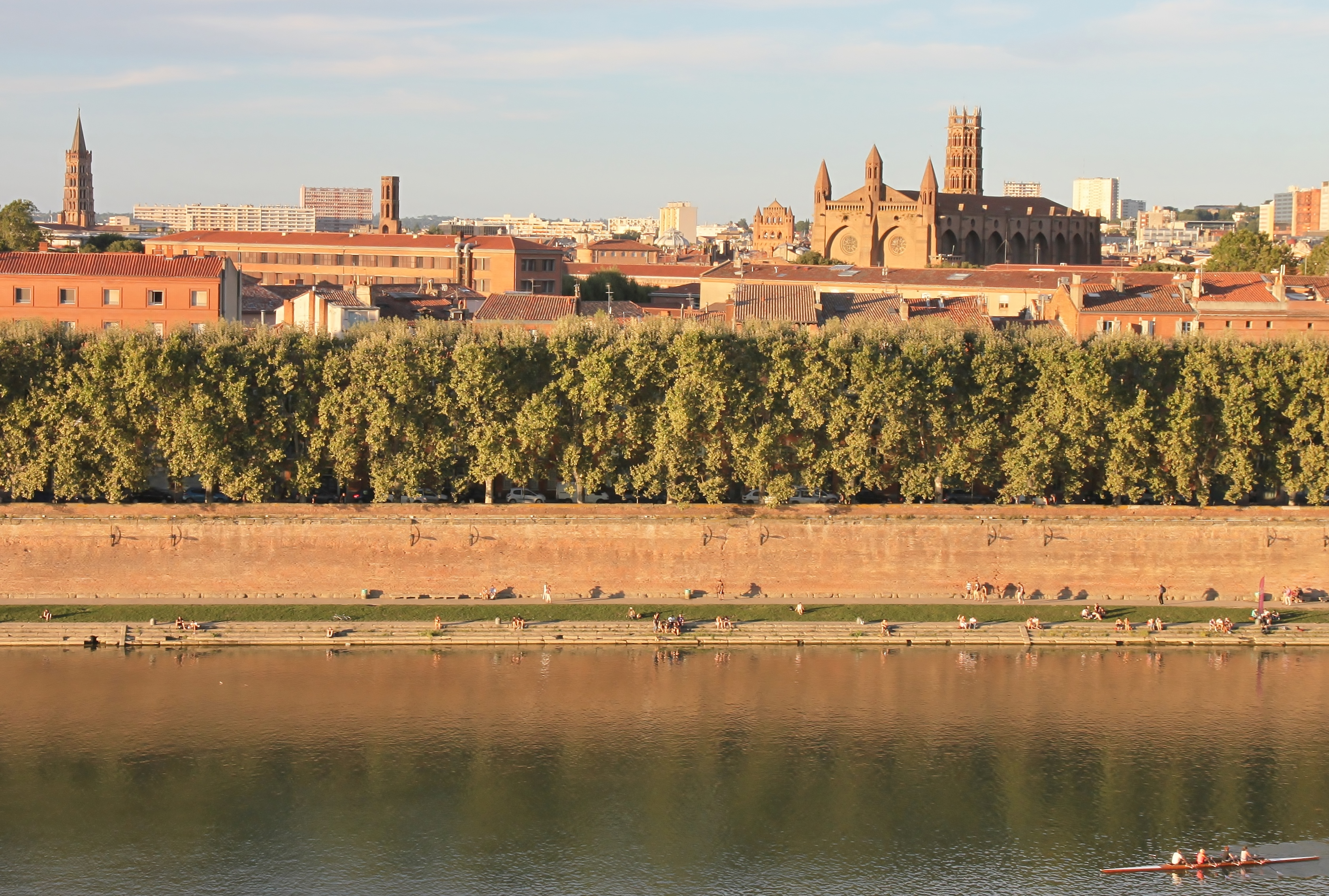
Banks of the Garonne in Toulouse

The Garonne's headwaters are to be found in the Aran Valley in the Spanish Pyrenees, though three different locations have been proposed as the true source: the Uelh deth Garona at Plan de Beret (42°42′34″N 0°56′43″E), the Ratera-Saboredo cirque 42°36′26″N 0°57′56″E), or the slopes of Pic Aneto (Salterillo-Barrancs ravine 42°38′59″N 0°40′06″E according to the season).

The Uelh deth Garona at 1,862 metres (6,109 ft) above sea level has been traditionally considered as the source of the Garonne. From this point a brook (called the Beret-Garona) runs for 2.5 kilometres (1.6 mi) to the bed of the main upper Garonne valley. The river runs for another 38 kilometres (24 mi) to the French border at Pont de Rei, 40.5 kilometres (25.2 mi) in total.

The Ratera-Saboredo cirque is the head of the upper Garonne valley, and its upper lake at 2,600 metres (8,500 ft) above sea level is the origin of the Ruda-Garona river, running for 16 kilometres (9.9 mi) to the confluence with the Beret-Garona brook and another 38 kilometres (24 mi) to the French border at Pont del Rei, 54 kilometres (34 mi) in total. At the confluence, the Ruda-Garona carries 2.6 cubic metres per second (92 cu ft/s) of water. The Ratera-Saboredo cirque is considered by many researchers to be the origin of the Garonne.

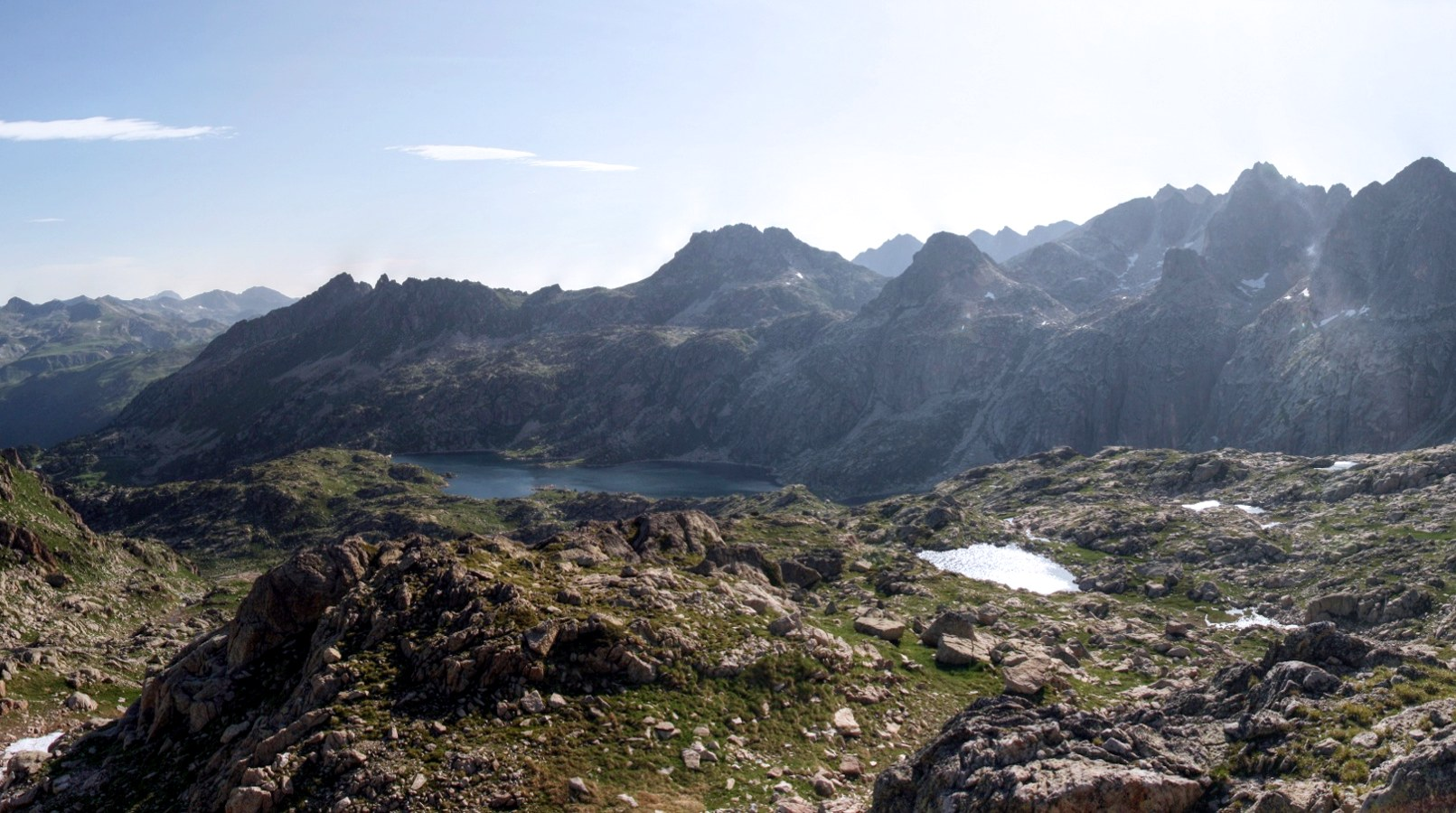
The Main Lake of Saboredo and Pic de Saboredo, the head of the Garonne valley

The third theory holds that the river rises on the slopes of Pic Aneto at 2,300 metres (7,500 ft) above sea level and flows by way of a sinkhole known as the Forau de Aigualluts (42°40′00″N 0°40′01″E) through the limestone of the Tuca Blanca de Pomèro and a resurgence in the Val dera Artiga above the Aran Valley in the Spanish Pyrenees. This underground route was suggested by the geologist Ramond de Carbonnières in 1787 but there was no confirmation until 1931, when caver Norbert Casteret poured fluorescein dye into the flow and noted its emergence a few hours later 4 kilometres (2.5 mi) away at Uelhs deth Joèu ("Jove's eyes" 42°40′51″N 0°42′28″E) in the Artiga de Lin on the other side of the mountain. From Aigualluts to the confluence with the main river at the bed of the upper Garonne valley at 800 metres (2,600 ft) above sea level, the Joèu has run for 12.4 kilometres (7.7 mi) (16 kilometres more to get to the French border), carrying 2.16 cubic metres per second (76 cu ft/s) of water, whilst the main river is carrying 17.7 cubic metres per second (630 cu ft/s).

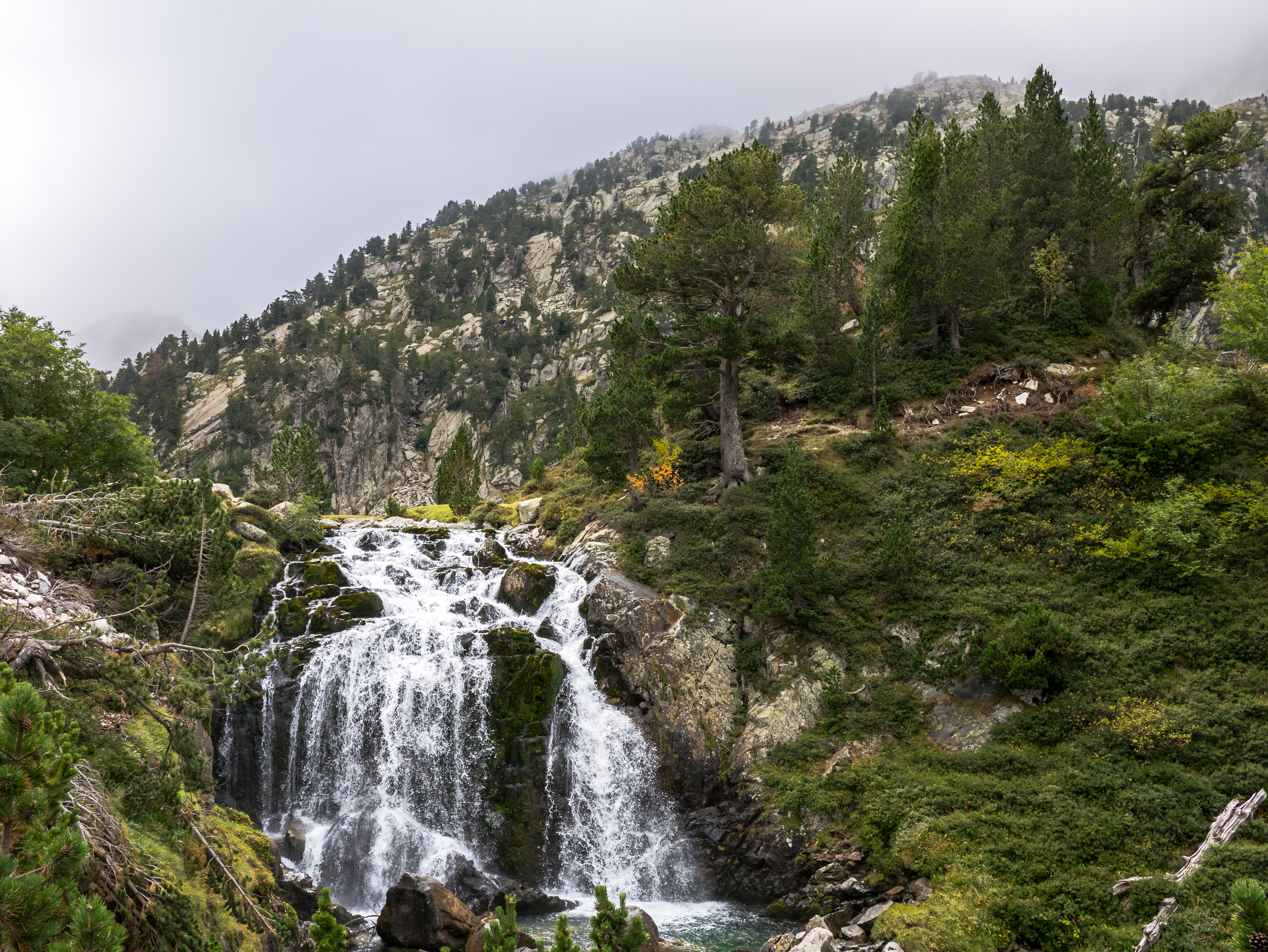
The water from Barrancs and Escaleta ravines disappears into the ground at Forau de Aigualluts.

Despite the lack of universal agreement on definition for determining a stream's source, the United States Geological Survey, the National Geographic Society and the Smithsonian Institution agree that a stream's source should be considered as the most distant point (along watercourses from the river mouth) in the drainage basin from which water runs.

The Ratera-Saboredo cirque is the "most distant point (along watercourses from the river mouth) in the drainage basin from which water runs" and the source of the Garonne, according to the United States Geological Survey, the National Geographic Society and the Smithsonian Institution convention on determining a stream's source.

=== Course ===
The Garonne follows the Aran Valley northwards into France, flowing via Toulouse and Agen towards Bordeaux, where it meets the Gironde estuary. The Gironde flows into the Atlantic Ocean (Bay of Biscay). Along its course, the Garonne is joined by three other major rivers: the Ariège, the Tarn, and the Lot. Just after Bordeaux, the Garonne meets the Dordogne at the Bec d'Ambès, forming the Gironde estuary, which after approximately 100 kilometres (62 mi) empties into the Atlantic Ocean. Other tributaries include the Save and the Gers.

Several river islands are located in the Garonne's lower course, immediately upstream from Bordeaux. The largest of these is Île de la Lande. Several islands are located north of the city close to the junction with the Gironde and in the Gironde estuary. These include three large islands, Île de Patiras, Île Nouvelle (a bird sanctuary), and the largest, the 11 kilometre-long Île Cazeau.

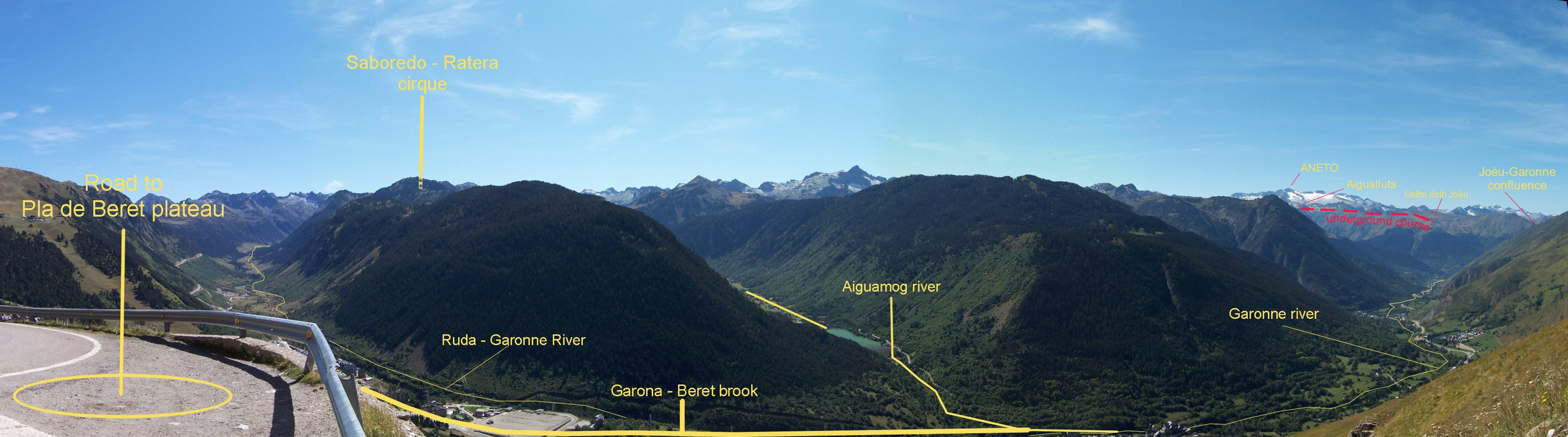
150° Panorama of the Aran Valley from the Beret Plateau, showing the Ruda-Garona and Beret-Garona confluence. In Vielha the Garonne turns westward (out of sight), and after 12 kilometres (7 mi) receives water from the Joèu (Pic Aneto).

The Garonne is one of the few rivers in the world that exhibit a tidal bore. Surfers and jet skiers could ride the tidal bore at least as far as the village of Cambes, 120 kilometres (75 mi) from the Atlantic, and even further upstream to Cadillac, although the tidal bore appears and disappears in response to changes in the channel bathymetry. In 2010 and 2012, some detailed field studies were conducted in the Garonne's Arcins channel between Arcins Island and the right bank close to Lastrene township. A striking feature of the field data sets was the large and rapid fluctuations in turbulent velocities and turbulent stresses during the tidal bore and flood flow.

=== European sea sturgeon conservation ===
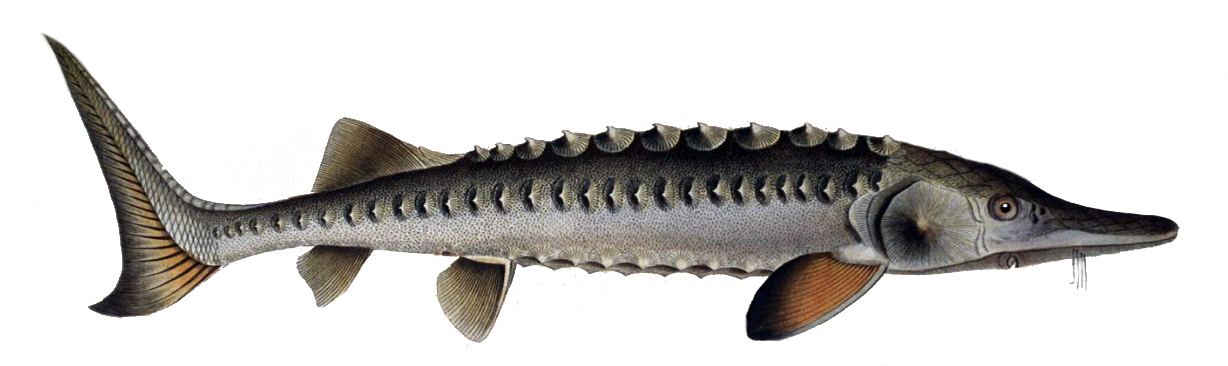
The European sea sturgeon (Acipenser sturio)

The European sea sturgeon (Acipenser sturio), also known as the Atlantic sturgeon or common sturgeon, is now a Critically Endangered species (IUCN) status. This species of sturgeon can reach a length of 6 m (20 ft), weigh up to 400 kg (880 lb) and reach an age of 100 years. Previously found on most coasts of Europe, it has now become so rare that it breeds only in the Garonne river basin in France. Conservation projects are under way to save this fish from extinction via species reintroduction from aquaculture, with the first releases having been made in 1995.

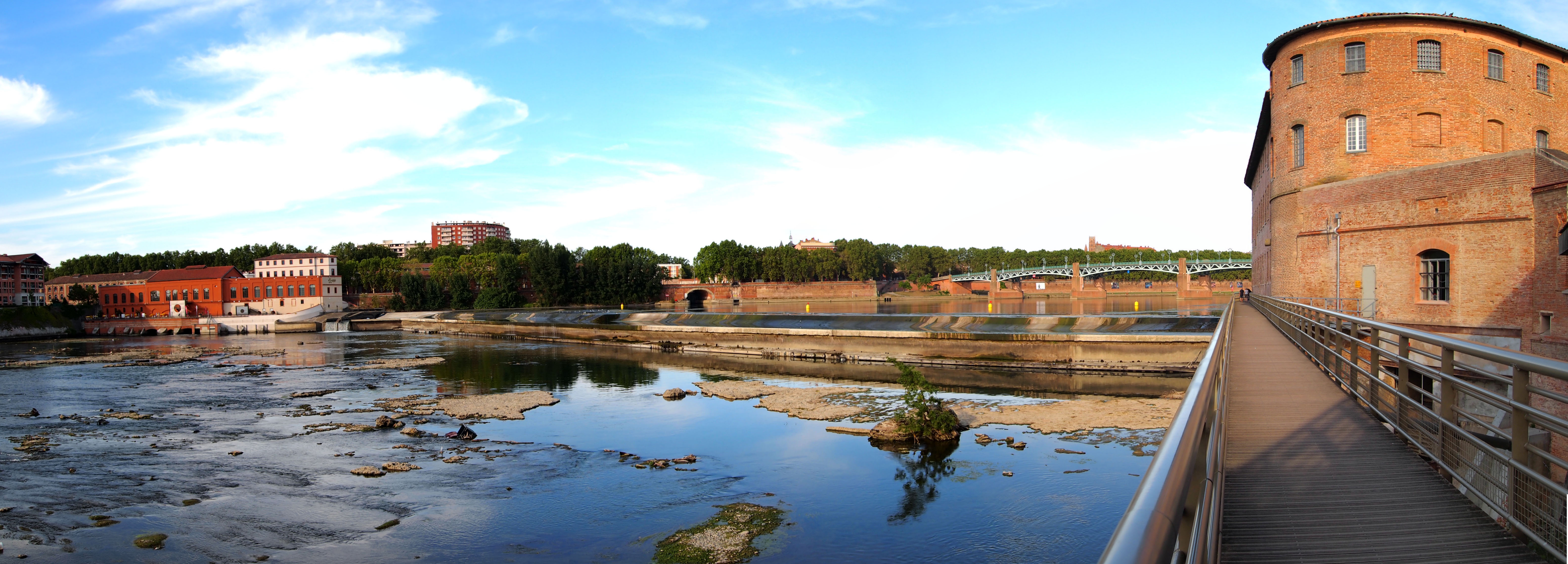
The Garonne at Toulouse

=== Towns along the river ===
- Aran Valley (Spain): Vielha, Bossòst
- Haute-Garonne (31): Saint-Gaudens, Muret, Toulouse
- Tarn-et-Garonne (82): Castelsarrasin
- Lot-et-Garonne (47): Agen, Marmande, Aiguillon
- Gironde (33): Langon, Bordeaux

== Main tributaries ==
Following the flow of the river, from source to mouth:

- Pique
- Ourse
- Neste
- Salat
- Volp
- Arize
- Louge
- Ariège
- Touch
- Hers-Mort
- Save
- Gimone
- Tarn
- Arrats
- Barguelonne
- Auroue
- Séoune
- Gers
- Baïse
- Lot
- Avance
- Dropt
- Ciron
- Gat mort
- Devèze
- Jalle de Blanquefort

== Navigation ==
The Garonne plays an important role in inland shipping. The river not only allows seagoing vessels to reach the port of Bordeaux but also forms part of the Canal des Deux Mers, linking the Mediterranean Sea and the Atlantic Ocean.

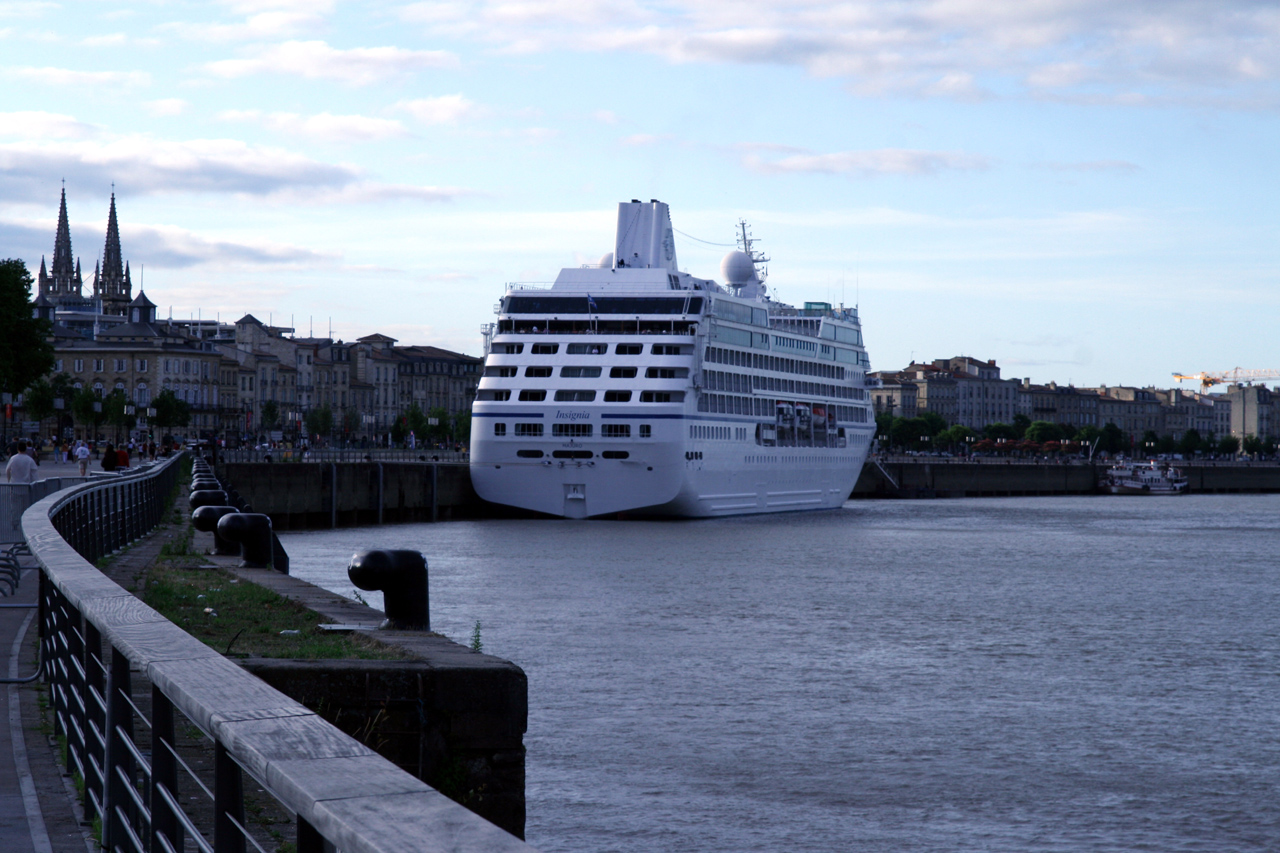
Seagoing vessels may navigate as far inland as Bordeaux on the Garonne.

From the ocean, ships pass through the Gironde estuary up to the mouth of the Garonne (to the right of the Dordogne when sailing upstream). Ships continue on the tidal river Garonne up to the Pont de Pierre (stone bridge) in Bordeaux. Inland vessels continue upstream to Castets-en-Dorthe, where the Canal de Garonne joins the river. Prior to the building of the Canal lateral à la Garonne, between 1838 and 1856, shallow-draught boats used the Garonne itself as far as Toulouse. However, navigation on the upper river was very uncertain, and this stretch of the river is no longer considered navigable. Instead the lateral canal takes boats through 53 locks to the town of Toulouse, where the canal meets the Canal du Midi.

== Hydrography ==
The upstream part of the river, upstream from Toulouse depends primarily on snow and snow melt. The lower/downstream part is rain fed as well as its main tributaries.

The Garonne also feeds several channels/canals:

- The Saint-Martory canal – Saint-Martory water intake takes 10 m^{3}/s from the river;
- The canal latéral à la Garonne – with the water intake in Toulouse by the Brienne canal.

SANDRE assigns to the Garonne a hydrographic identity number 0 --- 00000 and the generic code O --- 000014,15.

== Floods ==
Flood of January 2022 in Toulouse.

A flood of the Garonne in 1930 broke the dike in Thivras (Marmande).

In Toulouse, the Garonne has been the cause of many floods, especially since its left bank is inhabited.

The earliest records of floods are from around 1177. It is also recorded to have flooded in 1220, 1258, 1430, 1523, 1536 and in 1589, 1608, 1658, 1673, 1675, 1709, 1712, 1727, 1750, 1772, 1788, 1804 and 1810. In 1772, the Garonne reached 8 meters 50. In the recent centuries, in 1827, 1835, 1855 and 1856/7.

In Toulouse, in 1827, the water level of the Garonne rose four meters above the ordinary level and filled the arches of the Pont de Pierre and Pont Neuf.

In 1835, the Garonne rose to five meters above normal and 35 meters above the low water level and flowed through the four arcs of the Pont de Pierre.

Flood of the Garonne in 1835: 7,50 m at Toulouse Pont-Neuf

Flood of the Garonne in 1855: 7.25 m at Toulouse Pont-Neuf

Flood of the Garonne in 1875: 9,70 m to Toulouse Pont-Neuf (or 8m32 according to vigicrue).

Flood of the Garonne in 1879: 4,87 m at Toulouse Pont-Neuf

Flood of the Garonne in 1890: 3.30 m at Toulouse Pont-Neuf

Flood of the Garonne in 1900: 4,00 m in Toulouse Pont-Neuf

Flood of the Garonne in 1905: 4.24 m at Toulouse Pont-Neuf

Crete of 1927 in Aquitaine, particularly imposing after the confluence of the Garonne with the Lot (of which it remained raw reference), insignificant upstream18.

Flood of the Garonne in 1952: 4,57 m at Toulouse Pont-Neuf

Flood of the Garonne in 1977: 4,31 m in Toulouse Pont-Neuf

Flood of the Garonne in 2000: 4.38 m at Toulouse Pont-Neuf

Flood of the Garonne in 2004: 3,52 m at Toulouse Pont-Neuf

In 1777, the Garonne suffered an extraordinary flood to the point that the priest of Bourdelles took the trouble to retranscribe the event, at the end of the acts of the year, in the parish register of baptisms, marriages and deaths.

== Future water resource management ==
The "Garonne 2050" project, initiated by the Adour-Garonne water agency in 2010, aims to address the future challenges facing the Garonne River basin regarding its water resources. With an anticipated surge of an additional 1 million inhabitants by 2050, the basin confronts a demographic challenge. The study aims to inform stakeholders and devise an adaptation strategy within the local master plan of water management and development (SDAGE), considering the impact of the predicted demographic shifts. Central to the "Garonne 2050" study is its examination of the Garonne River basin's agricultural sector. Detailed insights into changes in irrigated agricultural areas, crop rotation, and farm numbers are essential for informing effective water management strategies. Notably, the allocation of water volume to agriculture highlights a delicate balance between sustaining local economic activities and the necessity for agricultural adaptation amid decreasing water availability.

== See also ==
- List of rivers of Europe
