= List of lost expeditions =

This is a list of lost expeditions.

== All parties presumed lost ==
Name	Leader	Year lost	Region	Comments
Lost Army of Cambyses	Cambyses II	524 BC	Egypt	(Achaemenid Empire) Cambyses II sent his army to destroy the Oracle of Ammon at Siwa Oasis in 524 BC. 50,000 warriors entered Egypt’s western desert near Luxor. According to the ancient historian Herodotus, somewhere in the middle of the desert the army was overwhelmed by a sandstorm and were presumed destroyed.
Vivaldi expedition	Vandino and Ugolino Vivaldi	1291	Morocco (North Africa)	(Republic of Genoa) Genoese exploration voyage to find a sea route to India. It was one of the first recorded voyages to sail from the Mediterranean into the Atlantic Ocean since the fall of the Roman Empire in the 5th century AD, and predated attempts by Christopher Columbus and Vasco da Gama by two centuries.
Abubakari expedition	Abu Bakr II	1311	Atlantic Ocean	Mansa of the Mali Empire who abdicated his throne in order to explore "the limits of the ocean".
Ferrer expedition	Jaume Ferrer	1346	Cape Bojador (Western Sahara)	Majorcan expedition to locate a fabled "river of gold" somewhere on the African continent.
Cabot's final expedition	John Cabot	1499	Atlantic Ocean	(England) English expedition to explore Newfoundland and eastern Canada.
Corte-Real expedition	Gaspar Corte-Real	1501	Labrador (Canada)	Portuguese expedition to discover the Northwest Passage. Part of the expedition, captained by Gaspar's brother Miguel Corte-Real, were sent back to Portugal and are the only known survivors from this expedition.
Corte-Real rescue expedition	Miguel Corte-Real	1502	Atlantic Ocean	(Portugal) Portuguese rescue mission to search for lost explorer Gaspar Corte-Real.
Knight expedition	James Knight	1721	Marble Island (Canadian Arctic)	(United Kingdom) British expedition to discover the Northwest Passage.
Lapérouse expedition	Jean-François de Galaup, comte de Lapérouse	1788	Victoria Strait (Oceana)	(France) French expedition which vanished while attempting to sail around the world.
Houghton expedition	Daniel Houghton	1791	Sahara (North Africa)	(United Kingdom) British expedition to explore the Gambia River and the hinterland of Africa's west coast.
Bass expedition	George Bass	1803	Pacific Ocean	(United Kingdom) British expedition to Tahiti, and possibly to the Spanish colony of Chile, before returning to the Sydney colony.
Franklin's lost expedition	John Franklin	1845	Victoria Strait (Canadian Arctic)	(United Kingdom) British expedition to traverse the last unnavigated section of the Northwest Passage.
Leichhardt expedition	Ludwig Leichhardt	1848	McPherson's Station, Coogoon (Western Australia)	(United Kingdom) British expedition to explore northern and central Australia.
Vogel expedition	Eduard Vogel	1856	Wadai (Central Africa)	(United Kingdom) British expedition to find a trade route to Asia that bypassed the Middle East. He was initially a party member of the Barth expedition but eventually left to go exploring on his own and disappeared a year later. In a visit to Wadai in 1873, Gustav Nachtigal was told that the Sultan of Wadai had ordered Vogel's death.
Russian polar expedition of 1900-1902	Eduard Von Toll	1902	Bennett Island (Arctic Ocean, north of Siberia)	(Russia) Russian expedition to search for the legendary Sannikov Land.
Terra Nova expedition	Robert Falcon Scott	1913	Antarctica	(United Kingdom) British expedition to become the first to reach the geographical South Pole.
Rusanov expedition	Vladimir Rusanov	1913	Kara Sea (Arctic)	(Russia) Russian naval expedition to the Arctic to find the Northern Sea Route.
Fawcett expedition	Percy Fawcett	1925	Dead Horse Camp (Brazil)	(United Kingdom) British archaeological expedition to the Amazon to locate the "Lost City of Z".
Sea Dragon expedition	Richard Halliburton	1939	near Midway Island (Pacific Ocean)	(United States) American expedition attempting to sail a Chinese junk across the Pacific Ocean from Hong Kong to San Francisco for the Golden Gate International Exposition.

== One or more surviving members ==
Name	Leader	Year lost	Region	Comments
Expedition of the bishop of Plasencia	Fray Francisco de la Rivera	1540	Strait of Magellan	(Spanish Empire) Two survivors appears years later in the recently established Spanish city of Concepción, thousands of kilometers from the alleged wreck site.
Willoughby expedition	Hugh Willoughby	1553	Barents Sea	(United Kingdom) British naval expedition financed by Sebastian Cabot to find a Northeast Passage through the Arctic, consisting of three ships under the command of Sir Willoughby and Richard Chancellor. The ships were separated in a storm in August 1553; Chancellor reached the White Sea while the other two ships mistakenly sailed North into the Barents Sea. Both crews, sixty-three men in total, were lost.
Grindell expedition	Thomas F. Grindell	1905	Sonoran Desert (Tiburón Island)	(United States) American gold prospecting expedition that went missing while exploring Tiburón Island. They were widely believed to have been killed by Seri or Yaqui natives. However, the remains of Thomas Grindell were discovered by another group of explorers a year later. Of the five-man party, there were only two known survivors: Jack Hoffman and Papago guide Dolores Valenzuela.
Brusilov expedition	Georgy Brusilov	1913	Kara Sea (Arctic)	(Russia) Russian naval expedition to the Arctic to find the Northern Sea Route. There were only two known survivors: Valerian Albanov and Alexander Konrad.
