= History of Franz Josef Land =

Map of Franz Josef Land

Franz Josef Land, an uninhabited archipelago located in the Arctic Ocean, Barents Sea, and Kara Sea, may have been discovered by the 1865 expedition of the Norwegian sealing vessel Spidsbergen captained by Nils Fredrik Rønnbeck. However, the discovery was never announced and the existence of the territory only came to public notice following the Austro-Hungarian North Pole Expedition of 1872, which named the archipelago in honor of Franz Joseph I of Austria. Benjamin Leigh Smith led the next expedition in 1880, which continued the work of the first expeditions in investigating the southern and central parts of the archipelago. Concurrent expeditions followed in 1896, Nansen's Fram expedition and the Jackson–Harmsworth Expedition, which met by accident. These two journeys explored the northern area and the flanks of Franz Josef Land.

The next series of expeditions used the archipelago as a base for attempts to reach the North Pole. The first, carried out by Walter Wellman in 1898, was followed the next year by the voyage of the Stella Polare then from 1901 to 1905 the Ziegler Polar Expedition took place. Although often poorly organized and unsuccessful at reaching their ultimate goal, these expeditions further explored the islands. Russian expeditions, starting with the icebreaker Yrmark in 1901, began visiting the area and conducted increasing amounts of scientific research alongside their exploration activities. Russia claimed sovereignty over the archipelago in 1914, and the Soviet Union formally annexed the islands on 15 April 1926, making it part of Arkhangelsk Oblast. Norway and Italy protested, and Norwegian sealers continued to operate in the surrounding waters for several years. A 1929 Norwegian attempt to establish a base failed.

The 1930 Bratvaag Expedition was the last Western European presence on the islands until 1990, except for an undetected German weather station on Alexandra Land during World War II. From 1932 the Soviet Union operated weather stations at Tikhaya Bay, Hooker Island and on Rudolf Island. The 1930s also saw the development of complete topographical maps with the islands used as launching points for drifting ice stations. During the Cold War the islands became strategically important and aerodromes were constructed at Nagurskoye and Heiss Island. The Ernst Krenkel Observatory was established in 1957. From 1991 foreign scientists were again welcome to the islands, which were declared a nature reserve in 1994. Tourism commenced and the archipelago became part of the Russian Arctic National Park in 2011.

== Discovery ==
There are two possible candidates for the claim to have discovered Franz Josef Land.

=== Voyage of the Spidsbergen ===
The Norwegian sealing vessel Spidsbergen with captain Nils Fredrik Rønnbeck and harpooner Johan Petter Aidijärvi aboard sailed northeast from Svalbard in 1865 in search of suitable sealing sites and found an archipelago that was most likely Franz Josef Land. They named the area Nord-Øst Spidsbergen (Northeast Spitsbergen) or Rønnbeck Land. However, an announcement of the discovery was never made and the archipelago remained unknown until the following expedition. It was at that time common to keep newly discovered areas secret to avoid competition for sealing and whaling from other vessels.

In a May 1865 article for the Russian magazine Morskoy sbornik, N. G. Schilling argued that current flows and ice conditions in the Barents Sea predicated the existence of a landmass between Novaya Zemlya and Svalbard. The report received little attention at the time, but from 1871 it was used as an argument to justify sending a Russian expedition to explore further. However, due to lack of funding the voyage never took place.

=== Austro-Hungarian North Pole Expedition ===
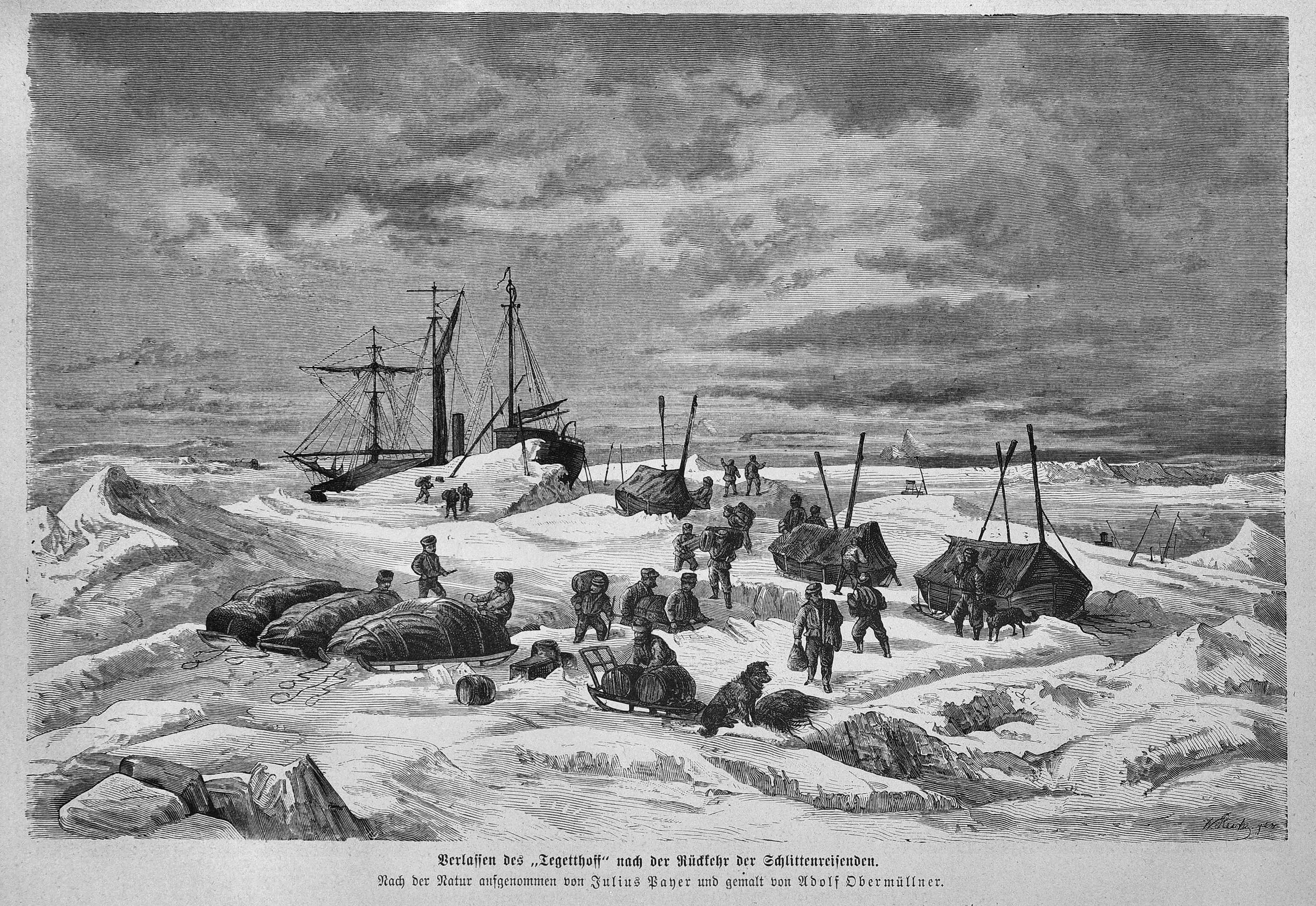

Discovery of the islands was first publicly announced by the Austro-Hungarian North Pole Expedition of 1872–74. Led by Julius Payer and Karl Weyprecht of Austria-Hungary on board the schooner Tegetthoff, this expedition's primary goal was to find the north-east passage with the secondary goal of finding a way for subsequent expeditions to reach the North Pole. The ship left Tromsø, Norway, in July 1872 but by August had become locked in pack ice north of Novaya Zemlya. The vessel drifted and eventually reached a hitherto unknown archipelago, which they named in honor of Franz Joseph I (1830–1916), Emperor of Austria. In May 1874 the crew of twenty-four abandoned the ice-bound ship. On 16 August they reached land at Novaya Zemlya. They followed the coast and was eventually picked up by a Russian fishing vessel which brought them to Vardø, Norway where they arrived on 3 September 1874. This expedition contributed significantly to the mapping and exploration of the islands.

The next expedition to spot the archipelago was the "Dutch Expedition for the Exploration of the Barents Sea", on board the schooner Willem Barents. Its plans frustrated by ice, the vessel never reached land.

== Other early expeditions ==
=== Leigh Smith ===
The next expedition to land on the islands was that of Benjamin Leigh Smith in 1880. The Briton captained the 250-tonne barque Eira, which left Lerwick on 22 June 1880 with an undetermined destination. After a stop by Jan Mayen Island, heavy ice off Spitsbergen forced them to choose a southern route, which sent the ship towards Franz Josef Land. The Eira landed 80 kilometers (50 mi) west of Wilczek Island on 14 August, such that all land subsequently spotted was newly discovered. Within days they had caught walrus, ivory gulls and polar bears. On 18 August the expedition discovered a natural harbor on Bell Island, which they named Eira Harbour and used as a base of operations. They then conducted a series of scientific experiments, explored the area and went hunting. The expedition next headed towards McClintock Island and Wilczek Island, but found their route blocked by ice. At the end of August they therefore returned to Svalbard, reaching Peterhead on 12 October.

Leigh Smith led another expedition in the same vessel the following year, which left Peterhead on 14 June 1881. He sailed to Novaya Zemlya, before heading north to Franz Josef Land, arriving on 23 July. The expedition landed at the natural harbor at Gray Bay on the south of Zemlya Georga (Prince George Land). In the second week of August a small shelter was built on Bell Island, which they named Eira Lodge and which still stands. It was used for storage of materials brought by the expedition. The Eira then headed eastwards to explore further, hoping to find the USS Jeannette, which was believed to be in the area. After a landing at Cape Flora ice hindered any further progress.

Pressed by pack ice Eira was holed and subsequently sank off Cape Flora on 21 August. Although men, stores and boats were saved, ice hindered the expedition from reaching Eira Lodge so instead the men built a turf and stone hut at Cape Flora. Coal and salt was brought from the lodge on 1 September, which meant that they had sufficient food, including fresh meat to ward off scurvy. The cottage was subdivided into two sections for officers and crew respectively. Twenty-four walruses and thirty-four polar bears were killed by the expedition during the winter. Meteorological reports were recorded, but lack of sleds made exploration difficult. The group set off in their boats for Novaya Zemlya on 21 June 1882. They reached a beach on Matochkin Strait on 2 August, where they rendezvoused with the Willem Barents and the British vessels Kara and Hope, which had been dispatched on a search mission.

=== Nansen and Johansen ===
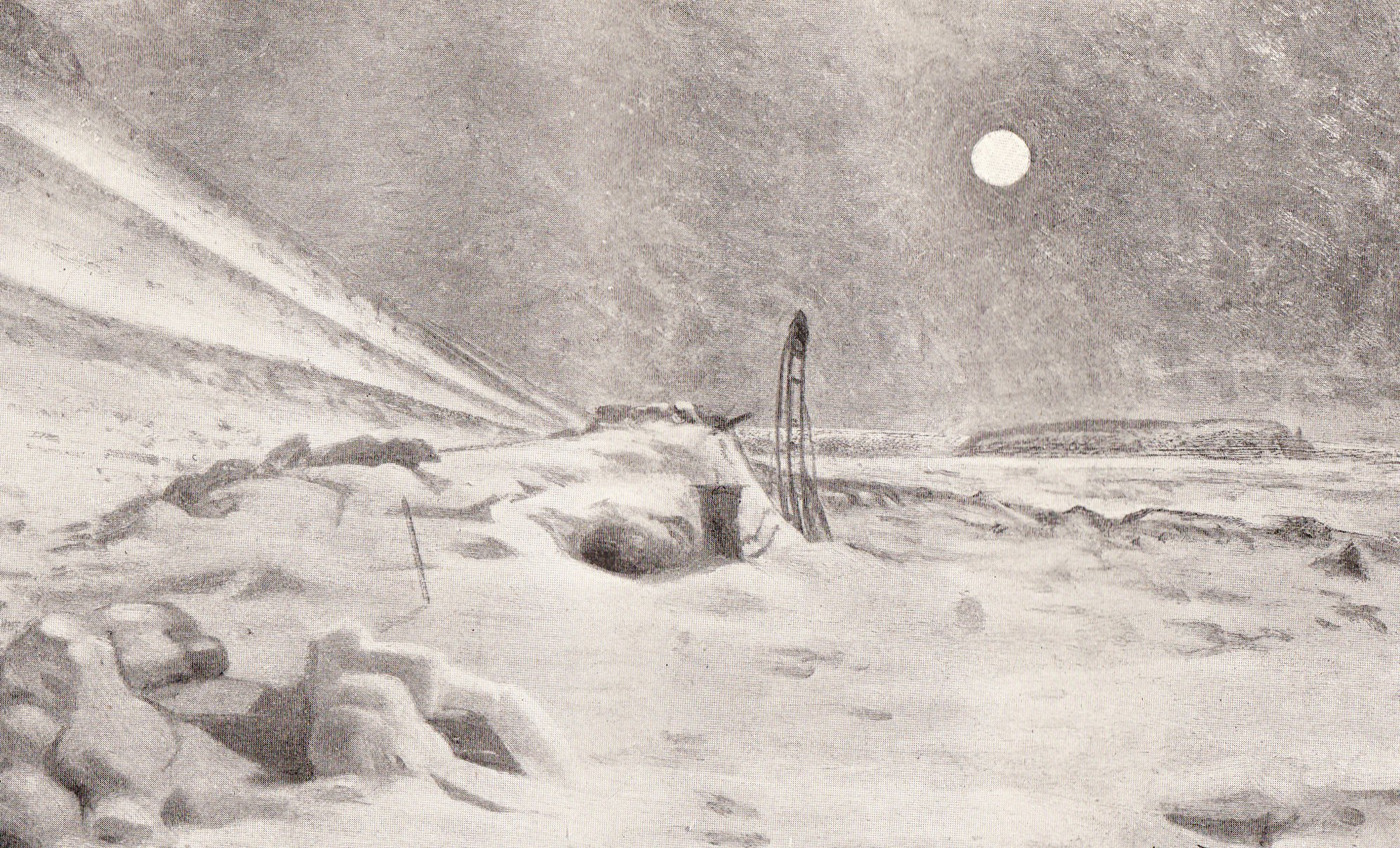
The hut on Franz Josef Land, covered in snow, in which Nansen and Johansen spent the winter of 1895–96. A drawing, based on Nansen's photograph.

Fridtjof Nansen's 1893–1896 expedition aboard the Fram attempted to reach the geographical North Pole by harnessing the natural east–west current of the Arctic Ocean. His custom-built vessel departed Christiania (today Oslo) on 24 June 1893 and sailed to the New Siberian Islands in the eastern Arctic Ocean. There she became frozen into the pack ice and had to wait for the drift to carry her towards the pole. Impatient with the slow progress and erratic character of the drift, after eighteen months Nansen and a chosen companion, Hjalmar Johansen, left the ship with a team of dogs and sledges to make for the pole. On 14 March, with the ship at 84°4′N, the pair finally began their polar march. They did not reach their objective, but achieved a record "Farthest North" latitude of 86°13.6′N before their long retreat over ice and water to reach safety in Franz Josef Land. Meanwhile, Fram continued to drift westward, finally emerging in the North Atlantic Ocean.

After his arduous travels, Nansen decided on 7 April that the pole was unreachable and instead headed for Cape Fligely on Rudolf Island, which had been discovered by Payer. Nansen and Johansen were thus able to establish that there was not, as Payer had predicted, any land north of 82°. The duo spotted their first land on 24 July, which Nansen named Eva Island after his wife and Liv Island for his daughter. These turned out to be the same island and is now named Eva-Liv Island. They reached Adelaide Island on 10 August, and for the first time in two years stood on dry land. By this point both their watches had become unreliable and they were therefore unable to establish exact locations. The last dog was subsequently shot and the journey continued by kayak.

Nansen believed he was on the west side of the archipelago and planned to reach Svalbard via the predicted Gilles Land, which turned out not to exist. He also aimed to reach Eira Lodge. Johansen, with his head nearly bitten off by a polar bear, and Nansen, exhausted from swimming after the drifting kayaks, were both close to death. By 28 August the winter conditions had become so severe that the expedition halted. The pair built a hut and waited for the next season at a spot they named Cape Norvegia. While they believed they were on Alexandra Land, they were in fact on Jackson Island where they sustained themselves on bear and walrus meat and blubber. At Christmas they turned their clothes inside out and from New Year they agreed to address each other with the Norwegian familiar form du instead of the formal De. They continued their journey on 19 May 1896 and left a note in the hut, which was found in 1902. The hut was visited by several expeditions, then forgotten until being discovered again in 1990. They continued southwards, with the ultimate goal of reaching Svalbard, until they stumbled upon the Jackson–Harmsworth Expedition by pure chance at Cape Flora on 17 June.

=== Jackson–Harmsworth ===
After the Austro-Hungarian and British expeditions, only the southern and central parts of the archipelago had been explored. At the time there was a presumption that a large landmass, tentatively called Petermann Land, stretched northwards, possibly all the way to the pole. To the west another landmass was expected, Gillis Land, which it was expected might reach as far as Svalbard. Frederick George Jackson hoped to exploit the previous expeditions' experience with overwintering to launch an expedition to explore the northern parts of the island group. To prepare for the trip, in 1893 he took an expedition to Yugorsky Strait and Vaygach Island, south of Novaya Zemlya. The plan was then to construct a series of depots along Franz Josef Land while moving northwards. Financing for the expedition was to be provided by the newspaper magnate Alfred Harmsworth.

The expedition left London in the Windward on 12 July 1894 and departed Arkhangelsk, Russia, on 6 August. The ship sailed north via Novaya Zemlya to Franz Josef Land, which it approached near Cape Crowther on Bell Island on 25 August. Ice prevented a landing before 8 September, when the expedition reached Cape Flora. The men took possession of Eira Lodge and erected four wood-and-canvas huts, naming the encampment Elmwood, with one party staying on land and the other on the ship. They remained there for the winter, with bear hunting their primary pastime. In March the group began a sledge expedition to establish depots to the north. As the actual geography of the archipelago became evident, the mission's character quickly became one of general exploration. The expedition's Furthest North was reached at Cape Mill on Jackson Island on 2 May.

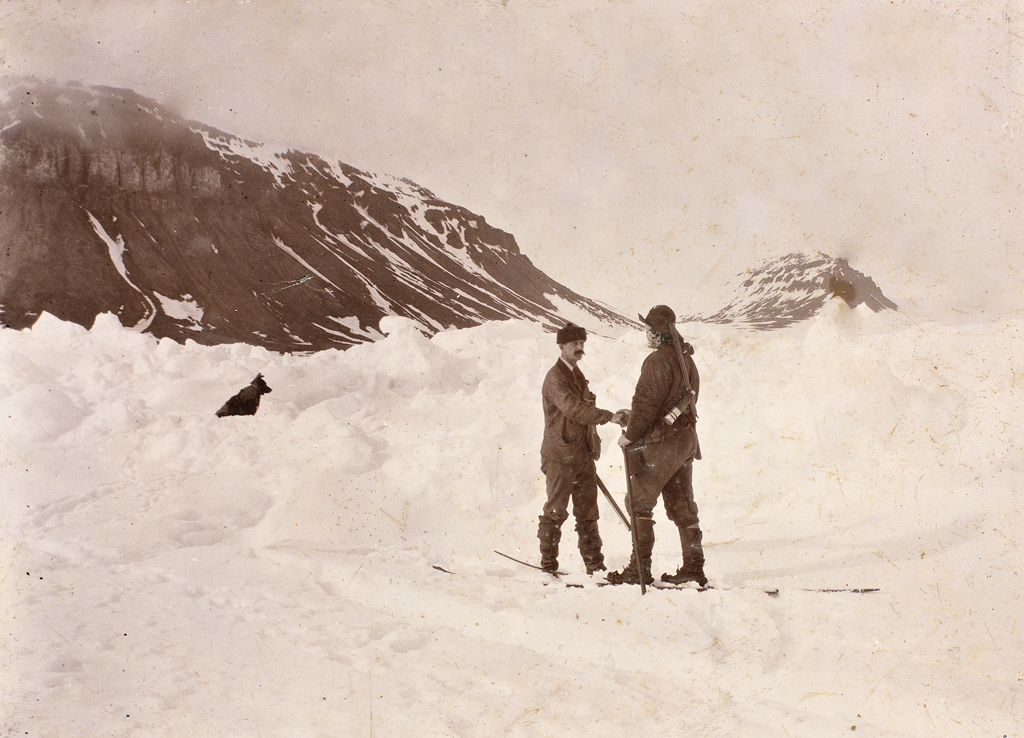
The Nansen–Jackson meeting at Cape Flora, 17 June 1896 (a posed photograph taken hours after the initial meeting)

During the summer Jackson sent out boating parties. Along with information collected from Nansen, this allowed him to assemble a more accurate map of the archipelago. Most of the names given by Jackson, largely named for expedition members and friends, remain today. In June, expedition member Mouatt died and was buried at Elmwood. Departing the area on 3 July, leaving eight expedition members at Elmwood, Windward sailed westwards to survey the land up to Cape Mary Harmsworth on Alexandra Land. Here they found a reindeer antler, establishing that the animals had once populated the islands. On their return trip to Elmwood, a boat with six men came close to being lost in a storm. During the second winter the boat remained stuck in the ice until September. By the time it reached Vardø in Norway, two further expedition members had died.

On 17 June 1896, Jackson met a stranger at Cape Flora, who he soon recognized as Nansen. He and Johansen stayed as Jackson's guests for several weeks, with the two parties sharing knowledge of the archipelago. The Windward returned on 26 July with Nansen and Johansen on board then returned to the mainland on 7 August. Jackson stayed for the next winter and the following spring, along with Albert Armitage, circumnavigated the western part of the archipelago in a period of eight weeks. Two whaling vessels, Balæna and Diana, had already arrived before the Windward landed on 22 July. With insufficient supplies for another full winter, the expedition packed up and returned to the mainland on 6 August. Supplies were left at Elmwood in the hope that they would assist any future stranded expeditions.

=== Wellman ===
Once the basic geography of Franz Josef Land became apparent, expeditions shifted to using the archipelago as a base for attempts to reach the North Pole. The first of these was conducted by the National Geographic Society-sponsored American journalist Walter Wellman. With experience of an expedition to Svalbard in 1894, he led an expedition of four Americans and five Norwegians on the sealer Frithjof, which departed Tromsø in late June 1898. They arrived off Franz Josef Land on 27 July, then visited Eira Lodge and Cape Flora. At Elmwood, Wellman gathered most of the supplies and continued eastwards, circumnavigating Wilczek Island and Salm Island before establishing a base at Cape Tegetthoff at the south of Hall Island. On 30 July he rendezvoused with the steamship Hekla, which had caught 212 walrus and 70 bears. From 5 August a party traveled northwards via Hall Island to Cape Hansa on southern Wilczek Land under poor conditions.

Further up the coast of Wiczek Land, at Cape Heller, they started construction on a camp subsequently christened Fort McKinley on 13 September. While the remaining members returned to Cape Tegetthoff on 22 October, Paul Bjørvig and Bernt Bentsen stayed the winter at the northern camp. They were given insufficient fuel for heating and lived in a constant temperature of −20 °C (−4 °F). They were also left with no medicine and ordered to consume none of the food stocked for the pole journey, only bear and walrus. Bentsen, by November seriously ill, died on 2 January 1899. Wellman reached Bjørvig's hut on 27 February and ventured north with four Norwegians and forty-two dogs where the party lost most of their equipment and 14 dogs on 22 March when violent weather set the ice in motion. With an injured foot, Wellman decided to return to Cape Tegetthoff. A party led by Evelyn Baldwin set out on 26 April to circumnavigate Wilczek Land and Graham Bell Island by sled. The entire group returned to the mainland on the sealer Capella in August. The expedition's main contribution was filling in the missing geographical details of the eastern region.

=== Amedeo ===
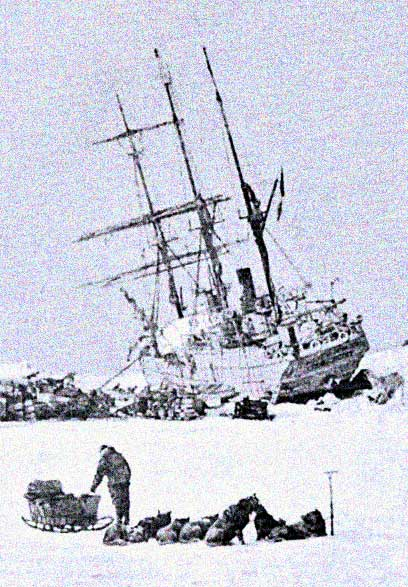
The Stella Polare was trapped and threatened to sink with the crew obliged to land with the utmost haste and to secure materials for building a dwelling.

The Italian nobleman Luigi Amedeo organized an expedition to sail as far north by land as possible and then traverse the ice sheet with sledges to the North Pole. He bought the Norwegian whaling vessel Jason, which he christened Stella Polare. The expedition left Christiania on 12 June 1899, taking on board 121 dogs in Arkhangelsk, which they left on 12 July. After sighting Northbrook Island on 21 July, they subsequently encountered the Capella and Wellman on 6 August, while stuck in ice in the British Channel. The Stella Polare eventually broke free and sailed north to Rudolf Island. Although hoping to continue along Petermann or King Oscar Lands, they established that no such lands were visible and instead established a winter base at Teplitz Bay. From August onwards, the ice proved strong enough for a dog sleigh expedition to explore the island.

On 8 September strong winds forced the ice into the bay, holing the Stella Polare, which was unloaded and huts built on the shore. An expedition of 12 men and 104 dogs, led by Captain Umberto Cagni, departed towards the North Pole on 21 February 1900, but returned two days later to make adjustments. They embarked again on 11 March but the first detachment of three people failed to return to base camp and their fate remains unknown. The second party arrived at the base camp on 18 April, reaching 86°34’N on 25 April, a new record before returning on 23 June. The Stella Polare set sail on 16 August, leaving a large amount of provisions behind for the three missing party members should they turn up. On the return voyage the ship again became stuck in the British Channel and did not reach Cape Flora until 31 August. The remaining members of the expedition arrived in Hammerfest, Norway, on 5 September. A search party led by the Capella's captain, Støkken, conducted an expedition to Cape Flora and the southern islands the following summer but found nothing.

=== Ziegler ===
Evelyn Baldwin returned to the archipelago in 1901 after receiving sponsorship from the American businessman William Ziegler for an expedition to the North Pole. He departed Vardø aboard the America on 27 July with 42 expedition members from the United States, Scandinavia and Russia along with 420 dogs and 15 ponies. At Cape Flora the expedition received an additional three years' supplies from the Frithjof then established a camp, christened Camp Ziegler, on Alger Island, with a smaller camp established 10 kilometers (6.2 mi) away. By spring, half the dogs and three of the ponies had died. Baldwin banned detours for scientific experiments, the keeping of diaries and the use of sleeping bags. Sled parties set out in January and by May had established supply depots on Greely Island, Coburg Island and Cape Auk on Rudolf Island. A small party was sent to Cape Norvegia to investigate Nansen and Johansen's hut.

America departed on 1 July, but despite the use of among other things dynamite, took sixteen days to clear the ice. The expedition was largely regarded as an utter failure by the exploration and scientific communities with its problems put down to a lack of proper management. Unhappy with the outcome, Ziegler organized a new expedition and appointed Anthony Fiala (photographer on the first expedition) as leader. With America in port at Tromsø, little time was needed to organize the new expedition. After a refit in Trondheim, America departed on 23 June 1903 and took on additional stores and dogs in Vardø on 10 July. In difficult ice conditions, the ship did not reach Cape Flora until 12 August and Jackson Island on 29 August. The expedition continued north to 82°14′N before returning to Tepliz Bay to spend the winter.

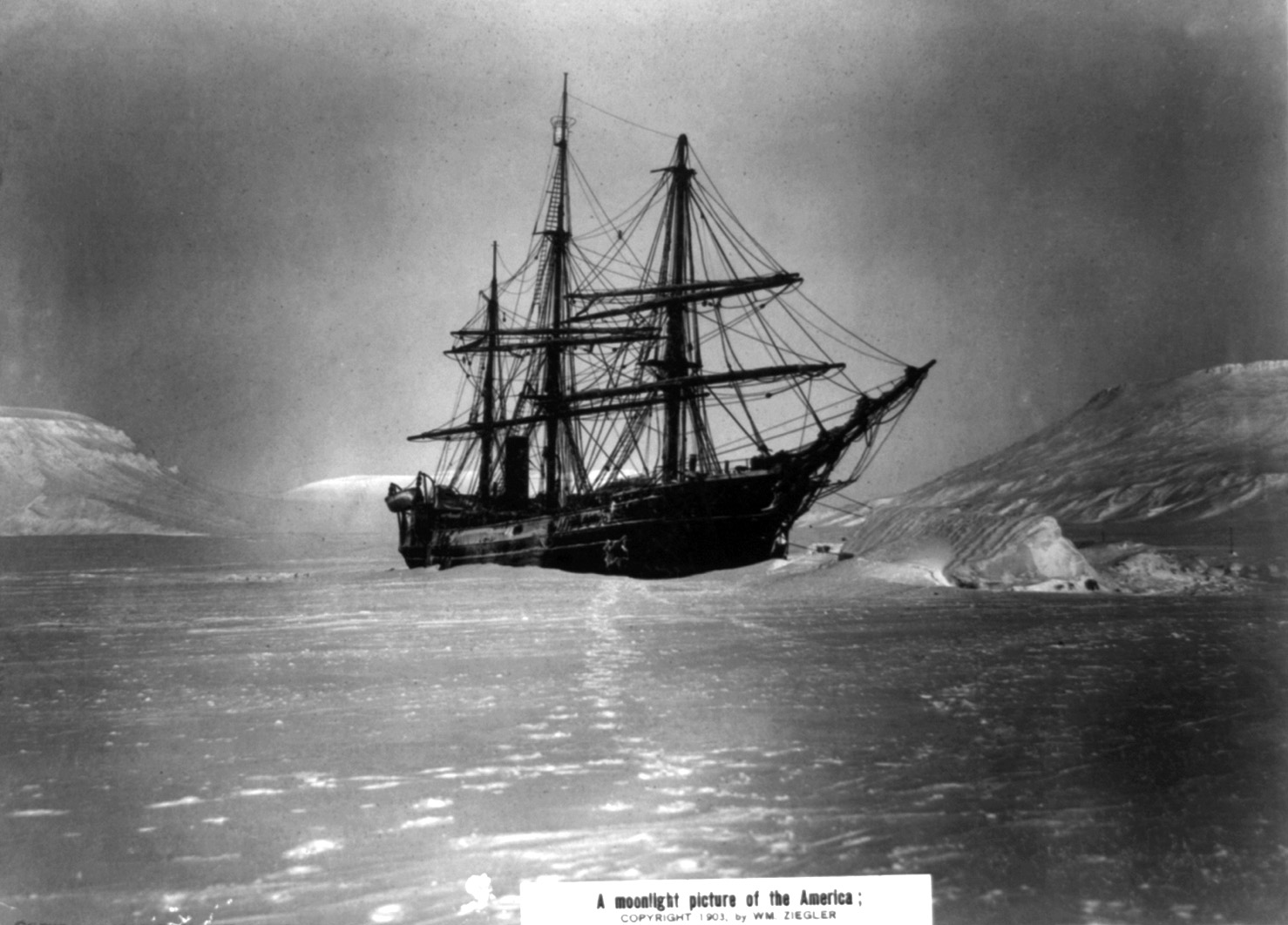
America anchored at Tepliz Bay

The ship came adrift on 22 October and the party spent three days recapturing her. She was evacuated on 12 November due to crushing by ice, but it was deemed safe for the crew to return until 21 December when the vessel was crushed beyond repair. On 22 January 1904 the ship disappeared, either sinking or drifting away during night. The first attempt to reach the pole began on 7 March with 26 men and Fiala acting as cook. Bad weather forced them to return to the base camp on 11 March. A new attempt made on 25 March lasted only two days before the expedition was forced to wait until the next spring before trying again. The men retreated to Cape Flora, although all but fourteen of them instead stopped at Camp Abruzzi. On 30 April the most enthusiastic men continued towards Cape Flora, which they reached on 16 May, the same day as one of the Norwegians died. A relief ship made two attempts to reach the party that summer, but failed.

The party sledged back to Camp Abruzzi between 27 September to 20 November. A new attempt to reach the pole commenced on 15 March 1905. After a week, the group reached open water, and Fiala decided to return.The rest of the season was spent moving supplies and exploring. Fiala returned to Camp Ziegler on 19 June, with the crew variously based there and at Cape Flora and Cape Dillon on southwest McClintock Island. The relief ship Terra Nova arrived on 30 July, departing on 6 August. Ziegler himself died on 24 May 1905, before the expedition ended.

=== Russian expeditions ===
The first Russian expedition took place in 1901, when the icebreaker Yermak traveled to the islands. Intended to reach the North Pole, she had only a quarter of the necessary power. M. P. Vasilev led this expedition to measure the meridian that departed Tromsø in May and reached Cape Flora on 24 July. It continued on to Hochstetter Island before returning to Tromsø on 20 August.

Hydrologist Georgy Sedov led the next expedition, which embarked from Arkhangelsk on 15 August 1912 aboard the Svyatoy Muchenik Foka. Ice conditions forced the group to spend the first winter off Novaya Zemlya then during the 1913 season it advanced to Cape Flora and arrived on 1 September. After establishing a wintering base at Tikhaya Bay on Hooker Island from 7 September, among its scientific studies were the first snow measurements of the archipelago and establishing that changes in the magnetic field occurred in cycles of fifteen years. The expedition also conducted topographical surveys of the surrounding area. Scurvy set in during the second winter and killed a machinist. Despite lacking prior experience or sufficient provisions, Sedov decided to press forward and march to the pole. He and two sailors started off on 15 February 1914, despite Sedov being ill at the time. His condition deteriorated and he died on 6 March whereafter the sailors returned to the ship on 19 March. The expedition embarked for the mainland on 30 July, and on 1 August they encountered two survivors from the Brusilov Expedition, including Valerian Albanov, which had set out to explore the Northern Sea Route.

Hertha was sent to find the expedition and its captain, I. I. Islyamov, hoisted a Russian flag at Cape Flora and proclaimed Russian sovereignty over the archipelago. The move was sparked by the ongoing World War I amid Russian fears that the Central Powers might establish themselves in the archipelago. Polish aviator Jan Nagórski flew towards Franz Josef Land to reach Sedov's group while the Andromeda set out for the same reason, However, both putative rescue missions failed to find anything but supplies, although the crew of the ship were finally able to determine the non-existence of Peterman Land and King Oscar Land.

== Annexation ==
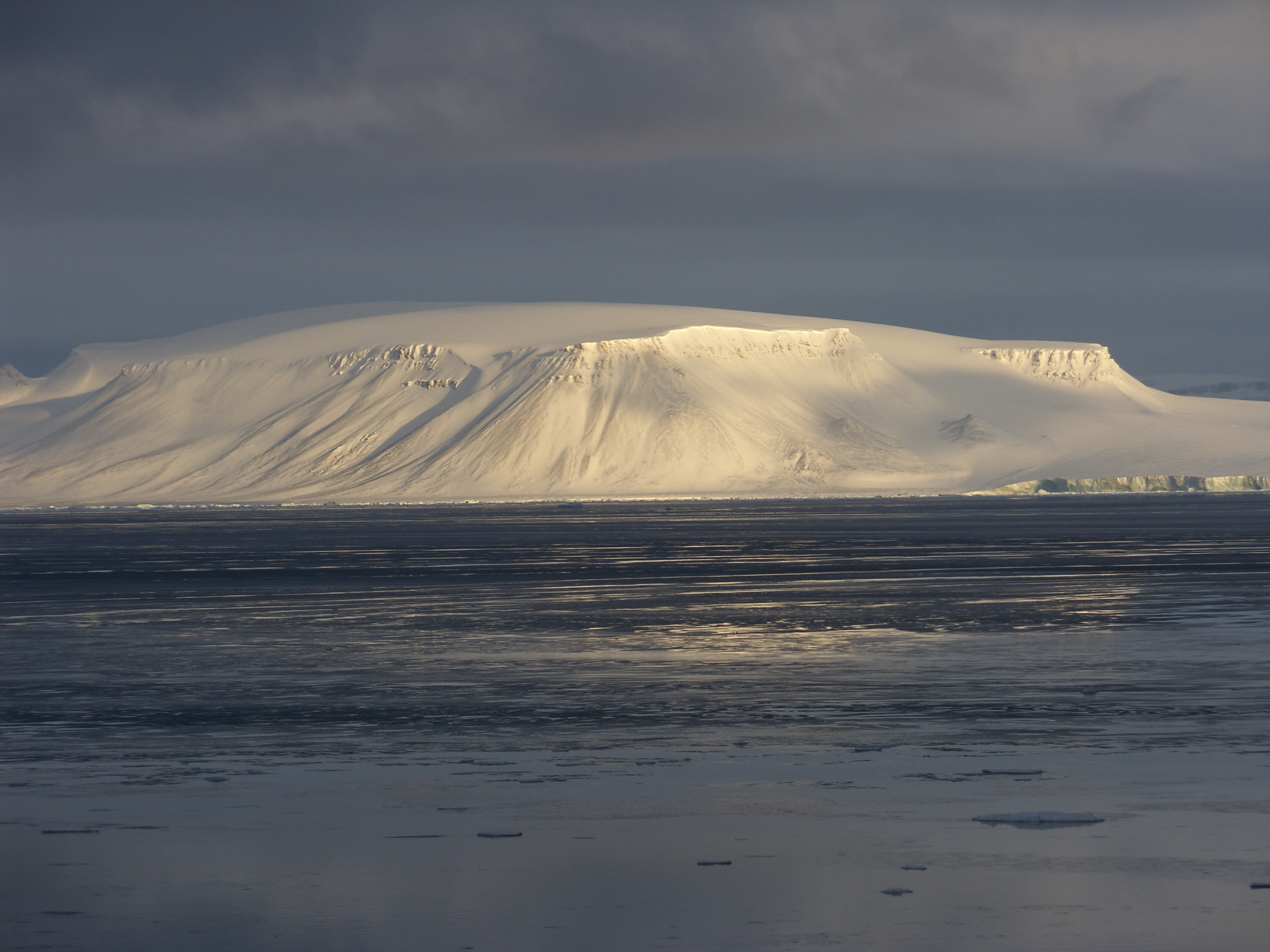
Heiss Island

The Soviet Union sent the Persey on expeditions to the islands in 1923 and 1924, followed by the Elding in 1925 and the Zarnica in 1927. Franz Josef Land had been considered terra nullius—land belonging to no one—until the Soviet Union declared its annexation on 15 April 1926, as part of Arkhangelsk Oblast, when it copied Canada's declaration of the sector principle and claimed that all land between the Soviet mainland and the North Pole would become Soviet territory. This principle has never been internationally recognized. Both Italy and Norway protested. Italy based its claim on the fact that it had acquired Triest from Austria-Hungary, the port from which the Payer expedition had been equipped. Norway was first and foremost concerned about their seal hunting and whaling economic interests in the area, during a period that also saw the country's activities curtailed in the White Sea, Novaya Zemlya and Greenland. The government of Norway chose to remain passive, while the Soviet Union did nothing to hinder twelve Norwegian hunting ships access to the area in 1928.

Italian explorer Umberto Nobile set out in his airship Italia to reach the North Pole in 1928. After it crashed, a series of multinational expeditions were sent to find him. Several of these were in the waters around Franz Josef Land. Among the vessels participating was the Soviet icebreaker Krasin. After having rescued some of the crew, the ship was sent onwards to Franz Josef Land, reaching George Land on 22 September 1928. Beyond erecting an iron Soviet flag at Cape Neal, they failed to construct any facilities.

The Government of Norway decided to protest the Soviet annexation by establishing a meteorological station on the archipelago, a task awarded to the Norwegian Polar Institute. An expedition was sent in 1929, in part financed by Lars Christensen, with the explicit task of annexing Victoria Island and establishing a base in Franz Josef Land. Norway further proposed a similar arrangement as in the Svalbard Treaty, whereby the Soviet Union could retain full sovereignty, but could not limit Norwegian economic interests. However, ice conditions hindered a Norwegian landing.

To support the annexation, the Polar Commission of the Academy of Sciences of the USSR proposed establishing a station at Tikhaya Bay on Hooker Island. An expedition was sent aboard the icebreaker Sedov, which departed Arkhangelsk on 21 July 1929. The expedition's head, Otto Schmidt, was subsequently proclaimed Soviet Commissar of Franz Josef Land. The expedition landed at Tikhaya Bay on 12 August, whereupon some of the crew began construction of a base. Meanwhile, the vessel continued to Rudolf Island, where another location was selected. The base at Tikhay Bay was officially opened on 29 August. The Soviet government proposed renaming the archipelago Fridtjof Nansen Land in 1930, but the name never came into use.

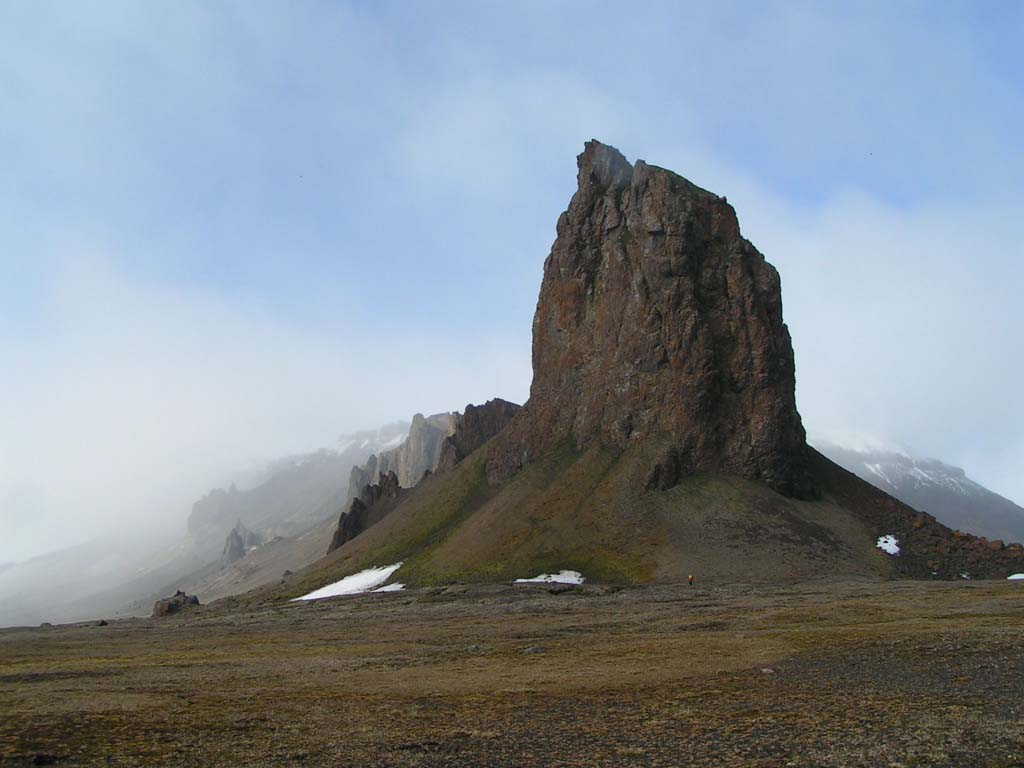
Cape Tegethoff on Hall Island

The 1930 Bratvaag Expedition, led by Norwegian geologist Gunnar Horn, was sent out to survey Svalbard, Victoria Island and Franz Josef Land. Norway followed up with another expedition the following year, aboard the tourist ship Isbjørn. While visiting the base at Tikhaya Bay, the Soviets asked that Norway in the future respect Soviet territorial waters. Other expeditions that year were a Norwegian-Swedish expedition led by Hans Wilhelmsson Ahlmann aboard the Quest and the German Graf Zeppelin. Apart from the German weather station established during the Second World War, these were the last Western expeditions to Franz Josef Land until 1990.

The Soviet Union sent the icebreaker Malygin to Rudolf Island during the Second International Polar Year in 1932 to establish a weather station. The Knipovich conducted the first circumnavigation of the archipelago and landed the first Soviets on Victoria Island. The 1933 season saw an Arctic and Antarctic Research Institute project complete a topographical map of the archipelago at a scale of 1:200,000. A geological and glaciological expedition was carried out in the 1934–35 season while over one hundred hours of cartographic flights were flown in 1935 to make corrections to the maps. Two more icebreakers, Sadko and Taymyr, explored the islands that year. From 1934 to 1936 sixty people stayed the winter at Tikhay Bay, where the first person was born on the archipelago.

Mikhail Vodopyanov and V. M. Makhotin carried out flights to the islands in 1936, in preparation for their expedition the following year, during which they hoped to reach the North Pole. The same year the icebreakers Rusanov and Hercen freighted in equipment for a drifting ice station on Rudolf Island. This was followed up with the construction of an airstrip on the island's glacier. The plans were executed in 1937, with four aircraft setting out on 18 April and the establishment of North Pole-1 as a drifting ice station headed by Ivan Papanin. A transpolar flight by Sigizmund Levanevsky went astray and ships were dispatched to search for him in the archipelago. With poor ice conditions, they were forced to stay the winter, bringing the archipelago's winter population to 300.

== Second World War and Cold War ==
After the Second World War broke out, Soviet interest in the archipelago dwindled. The base at Rudolf Island closed in 1941 and only a small group of men remained at Tikhay Bay, unsupplied throughout the war, and unaware of the existence of the German weather station. Half of the men remained until they were picked up by the icebreaker J. Stalin in 1945, with the remainder returning home the following year.

The Arctic islands were of strategic importance during the war in part because of the weather reports they produced. With the Allies strong grip on most suitable locations, Germany established an undetected weather station on Alexandra Land named Schatzgräber, located 500 meters (1,600 ft) inland from Cambridge Bay. Ten men landed in September 1943 after a three-day voyage from Tromsø in the weather observation ship Kehdingen escorted by U-387. Additional supplies were dropped by aircraft in May 1944. The entire party ate raw polar bear meat the same month, which almost caused the entire station to cease operation as a result of most of the men becoming infected with trichinosis.

After the men insisted on medical treatment a makeshift airstrip was built but it proved unsuitable although a Focke-Wulf Fw 200 was able to land on 7 July 1944 some 5 kilometers (3.1 mi) away. U-354 came to the rescue and all twelve men were evacuated that day, although with considerable difficulty, as they had to walk to the aircraft carrying the sick men on stretchers. The first four men were transported in twelve hours, although with the help of a cart, while the last eight were transported in six. The aircraft departed on 10 July whereafter the base remained in operational condition, as it was planned to send a new group to replace the evacuees. However, by October U-387 was dispatched to clear the stores and instead set up an automated weather station. The ice proved too difficult for a landing and the station was instead set up on Novaya Zemlya.

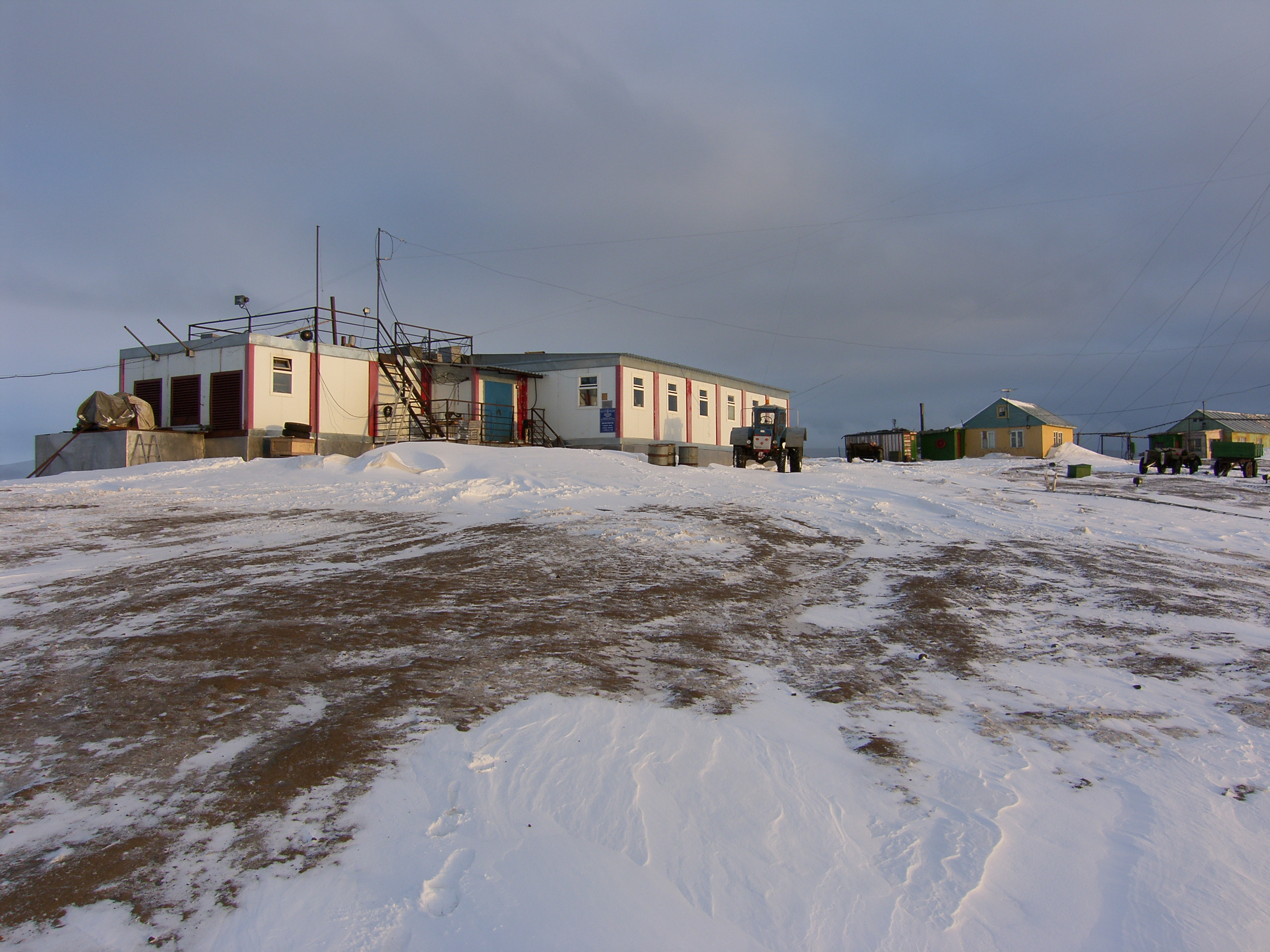
Ernst Krenkel Observatory

The Cold War resulted in renewed interest in the islands from the Soviet Union, this time because of their military strategic significance. Regarded as an "unsinkable aircraft carrier", the location of the German weather station was selected for the Nagurskoye aerodrome and military base. Meanwhile, from 1949 to 1952, the Arctic Institute carried out an expedition to Hooker Island in the hope of establishing a military base and aerodrome on and inside the ice cap. A major glaciological aerial expedition was carried out in 1955, with landings on the ice caps of many islands. With the advent of intercontinental ballistic missiles, the Soviet Union changed its military strategy in 1956, abolishing the strategic need for an airbase on the archipelago. This decision also allowed for the international publication of the Soviet research garnered during the preceding decade.

The International Geophysical Year of 1957 and 1958 gave a new rise to the scientific interest in the archipelago. An airstrip was built on Heiss Island in 1956, which could serve as a base for Antonov An-2 aircraft. The following year the geophysical Ernst Krenkel Observatory was established. The research results were coordinated with measurements in the Antarctic and the Kerguelen Islands. A base at Chiurlionis Ice Cap on Hooker Island was built to study ice core samples. In 1958 the weather station at Hooker Island closed and moved to the observatory. The Arctic Geology Research Institute carried out an extensive survey of the geology of the islands. Activity at Tikhaya Bay were reduced from 1957 and the base closed two years later.

Because of the islands' military significance, the Soviet Union closed off the area to foreign researchers. An exception was made in 1967, when French geophysicists were permitted to take part in an ionospheric program. The Zoological Institute of Leningrad undertook marine-biological surveys with a diving expedition in 1970. A botanical survey from Leningrad was carried out in 1979 and the following year an Arctic Institute investigation of various glaciers included aerial photographs. Ornithological surveys were carried out on Graham Bell and Hooker Islands in 1981.

== Internationalization ==
The Soviet Union allowed international activities on the archipelago from 1990, with non-Russians given fairly straightforward access. A cooperative venture between the Academy of Sciences, the Norwegian Polar Institute and the Polish Academy of Sciences was the first of several archaeological expeditions organized by the Institute of Culture in Moscow. The same year, a reopening of the base at Tikhaya Bay was jointly organized by the three countries. In Aug 1990 and Aug 1991, the Institute of Geography in Moscow, Stockholm university and Umeå university (Sweden) conducted expeditions to Alexandra Land, studying the climate- and glacial history of the region by e.g. radiocarbon dating raised beaches and antlers from extinct caribou.

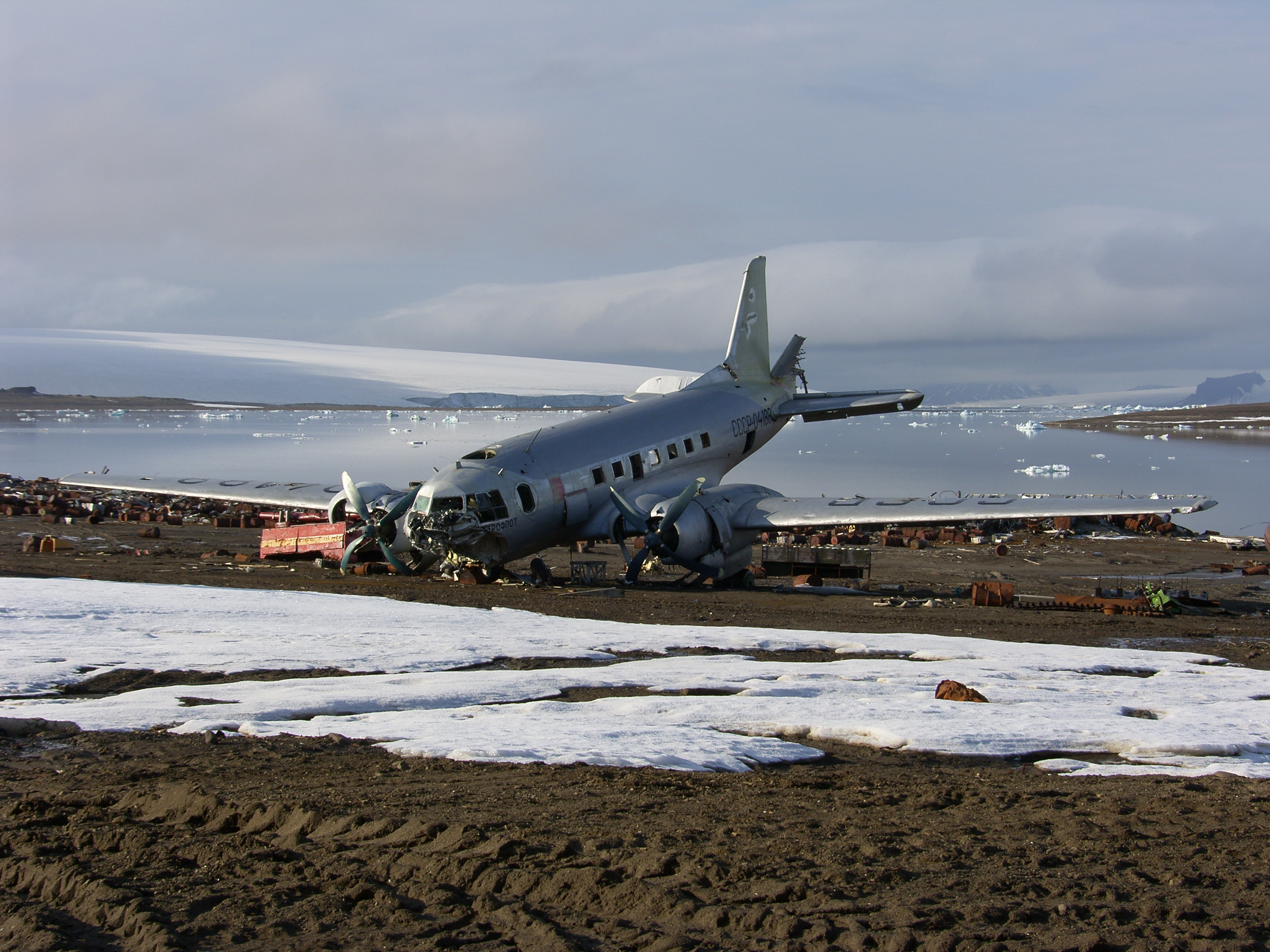
An Ilyushin Il-14 which crashed at Graham Bell Island in 1981

The base on Graham Bell Island was abandoned during the early 1990s while military activities at Nagurskoye were reduced to that of a border post, and the number of people stationed at Krenkel Observatory reduced from seventy to a dozen. The archipelago and the surrounding waters were declared a nature reserve in April 1994, covering an area of 42,000 square kilometers (16,000 sq mi). This was protected as the more liberal zakaznik type of reserve. During this period several other federal subjects—Murmansk Oblast, Krasnoyarsk Krai and Moscow—all offered to take over the administration of the islands.

The opening of the archipelago also saw the introduction of tourism, most of which now takes place aboard Russian-operated icebreakers. Popular sites include Cape Flora, Tickaya Bay, Nansen and Johansen's hut as well as the Russian stations with tourists are commonly landed by helicopter. The Russian Armed Forces upgraded the base at Nagurskoye with the construction of a new barracks. In 2012 the Russian Air Force decided to reopen Green Bell Airfield as part of a series of reopenings of air bases in the Arctic.

Plans for a national park covering northern Novaya Zemlya and Franz Josef Land were launched in the 2000s. When the Russian Arctic National Park was established on 15 June 2009, Franz Josef Land and Victoria Island were excluded. Prime Minister Vladimir Putin visited the archipelago in 2010, describing it as a "giant rubbish tip". By 2011 the national park had been expanded to include Franz Josef Land in a move to better accommodate tourism in the archipelago. From 2012, Russia commenced a 1.5 billion ruble, three-year clean-up project to remove more than 100,000 tonnes of waste which had accumulated during the Soviet era. These include a quarter million barrels of oil products, a million old barrels and dilapidated vehicles, radar installations and aircraft, among others.
