= Sorevnovaniya Island =

Uninhabited island in the southern region of the Kara Sea

Coordinates: 75°10′N 88°10′E

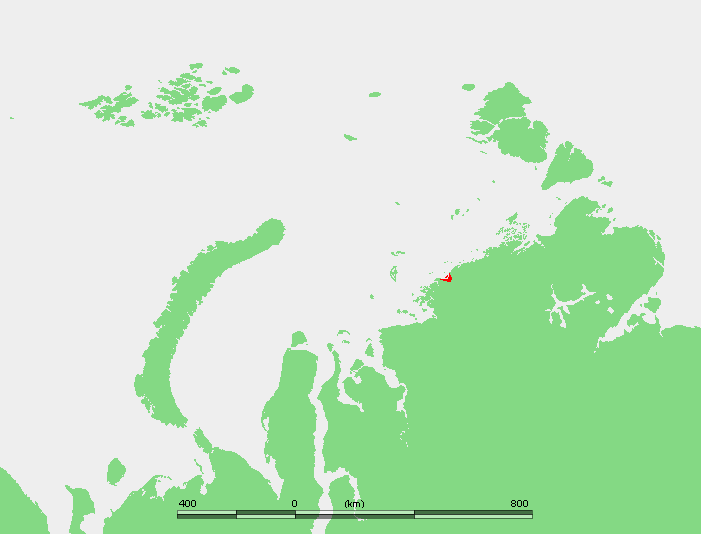
Location of Sorevnovaniya Bay and the main island in its shores.

Sorevnovaniya Island (Russian: Остров Соревнования) is an uninhabited island in the southern region of the Kara Sea. This island is located in the Sorevnovaniya Bay, east of the Mikhailov Peninsula.

The main island is roughly triangular. It has a length of 8 km, an average width of 3.5 km, and a small lake in its midst. This island lies very close to the coast of the Taymyr Peninsula; it is separated from it by a sound that is only 0.5 km in width.

There are two smaller islands in Sorevnovaniya Island's immediate vicinity. The offshore island, Ostrov Yezh, is 1 km in length and is located 2 km to the west of its southwestern cape. The other is slightly larger and lies to the southeast of the main island's southern tip, within a small enclosed bay.

These islands and the nearby coast are in the desolate tundra regions of Siberia. The sea surrounding the islands is covered with pack ice with some polynias in the long winter and the climate is harsh even in the summer.

Sorevnovaniya Island belongs to the Krasnoyarsk Krai administrative division of the Russian Federation. It is also part of the Great Arctic State Nature Reserve – the largest nature reserve of Russia and one of the biggest in the world.

== History ==
The area around these islands was explored by Otto Sverdrup on ship Eklips in 1914 while he was searching for Brusilov and Rusanov.

Peter Tessem and Paul Knutsen, the ill-fated members of Roald Amundsen's Northern expedition in 1919, were lost in the vastness of this bleak and uninhabited area, where survival is difficult. In 1921, a Soviet-Norwegian expedition looking for Tessem and Knutsen found the remains of a campfire with charred bones near this area. These were initially assumed to be the remains of one of the Norwegian men. Recent evidence, however, points out that this campfire had been probably left behind by the similarly ill-fated Rusanov expedition.
