= Alexander Kuchin =

Russian oceanographer and Arctic explorer

Aleksandr Kuchin
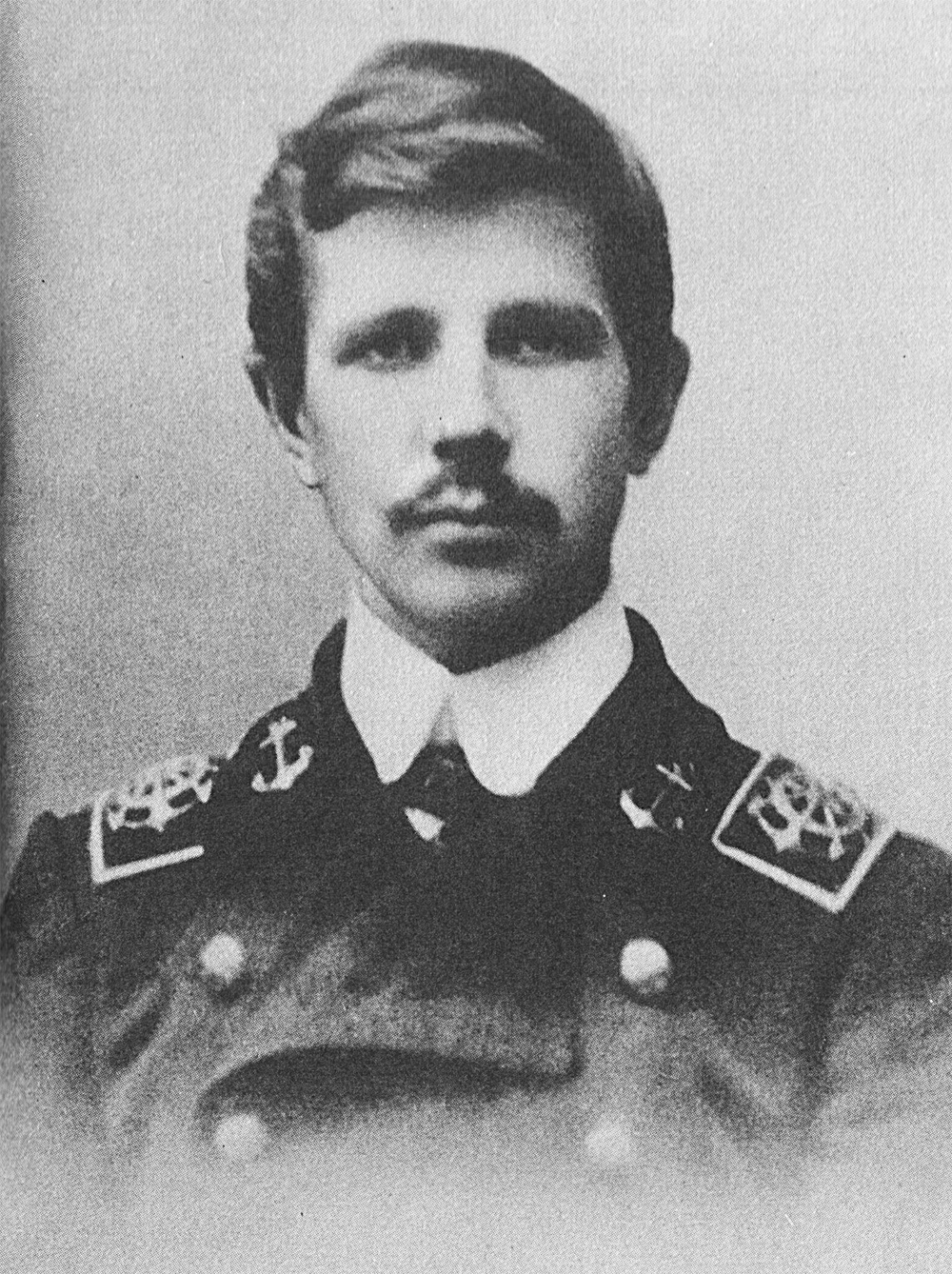
- Born: 1888
- Died: c. 1913 (aged 24–25)
- Occupation: Oceanographer

Alexander Stepanovich Kuchin (Russian: Александр Степанович Кучин; 28 September 1888 in Onega – 1913? in an unknown place in the Kara Sea) was a young Russian oceanographer and Arctic explorer.

== Background ==
Hailing from a humble background, Alexander Kuchin became a seaman in a Norwegian ship already when he was seventeen. The young man loved the Norwegian language, which he mastered in one year.

In 1907 Alexander Kuchin worked in Bergen, at a Norwegian Biological Station, becoming a student of oceanography expert Professor Bjorn Helland-Hansen. Meanwhile, his enthusiasm for the Norwegian language was such that he wrote a "Small Russian-Norwegian dictionary" ("Малый русско-норвежский словарь") in order to share his knowledge with his compatriots.

In 1910–1911, Alexander Kuchin was the only foreigner on Amundsen's expedition to the South Pole on the Fram. He made numerous observations in the Southern Atlantic as an oceanographer and navigator. After his return to Norway, in December 1911, Alexander Kuchin was engaged to 18-year-old Aslaug Paulson, the daughter of Andreas Paulson, a prominent Norwegian journalist.

In 1912, Kuchin returned to Russia, where he joined Vladimir Rusanov's expedition as captain of the ship Gerkules to Svalbard. This expedition's goal was to investigate the coal potential of the Archipelago. He sailed from Aleksandrovsk-na-Murmane (now Polyarnyy, near Murmansk) on 26 June. The personnel consisted of thirteen men and one woman, Rusanov's French fiancée. Apart from Rusanov there was another geologist and a zoologist.

== Disappearance ==
At the end of a very successful summer's field work, three members of the expedition (the geologist, the zoologist and the ship's bosun) returned to Russia via Grønfjorden in Norway. The remaining ten, including Captain Alexander Kuchin, without consultation with the authorities in St. Petersburg, set off with Rusanov in an incredibly rash attempt at reaching the Pacific Ocean via the Northern Sea Route. However, their ship Gerkules was too small for the kind of expedition Rusanov had in mind.

The last to be heard of Rusanov's expedition was a telegram left at Matochkin Shar on Novaya Zemlya, which reached St. Petersburg on 27 September 1912. In it, Rusanov indicated that he intended rounding the northern tip of Novaya Zemlya, and heading east across the Kara Sea but nothing was heard from the Gerkules thereafter. It is presumed to have disappeared without trace sometime after September 1912 in the Kara Sea, off the northern coast of Siberia.

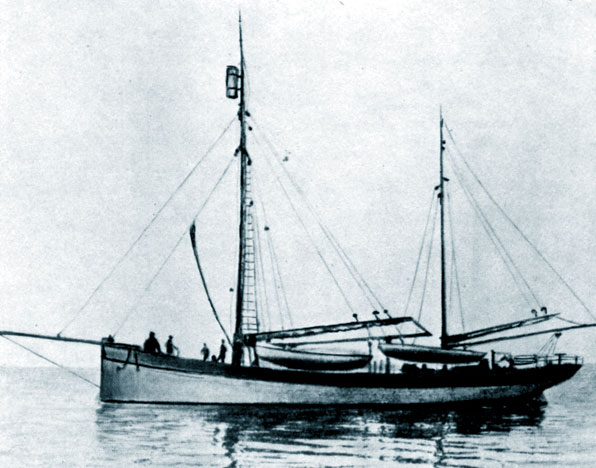
Hercules schooner

In 1914–15 the almost impossible task of searching for Rusanov's expedition (as well as for similarly disappeared Captain Brusilov from another expedition), was entrusted to Otto Sverdrup with the ship Eklips. His efforts, however, were unsuccessful.

In 1937, the Arctic Institute of the USSR organized an expedition to the Nordenskiöld Archipelago on ship Toros. Relics of the ill-fated 1912–13 expedition on the Gerkules were found on one of the Mona Islands and on Popov-Chukchin Island located at (74° 56'N, 86° 18'E) off Kolosovykh Island in the Kolosovykh group.

Two small islets off Salisbury Island in Franz Josef Land have been named after Alexander Kuchin. Aslaug Paulson, Alexander Kuchin's Norwegian fiancée, died in 1987.

== Works ==
- "Малый русско-норвежский словарь" ("Small Russian–Norwegian dictionary"), 1907

== See also ==
- List of people who disappeared at sea
