= William Barr (historian) =

Scottish historian

William Barr (born 1940) is a Scottish historian with a specific interest in the history of exploration of the Arctic, and to a lesser degree, the Antarctic. He holds degrees in Geography from the University of Aberdeen, Scotland and McGill University, Montreal, Canada. From 1968 until 1999 he was a member of the faculty of the Department of Geography, University of Saskatchewan, Saskatoon, Canada and is now a professor emeritus there.

Since 1999 he is a Research Fellow in residence at the Arctic Institute of North America, University of Calgary.

For the past 30 years the history of the exploration of the Arctic has been the focus of his research. He has published 16 books, including translations from French, German, and Russian. In 2006, William Barr received a Lifetime Achievement Award for his contributions to the recorded history of the Canadian North from the Canadian Historical Association.

Most of the titles of his works show that William Barr is an admirer of Russian Arctic explorers. His contribution has been crucial to make known to the wider public the exploits of Polar explorations by Russia and the Soviet Union.

== Works ==
- Baron Eduard von Toll's Last Expedition: The Russian Polar Expedition, 1900–1903
- The First Soviet Convoy to the Mouth of the Lena.
- The Drift of Lenin's Convoy in the Laptev Sea, 1937–1938. (full text)
- The First Tourist Cruise in the Soviet Arctic.
- The Last Journey of Peter Tessem and Paul Knutsen, 1919.
- Otto Sverdrup to the rescue of the Russian Imperial Navy.
- Imperial Russia's Pioneers in Arctic Aviation.
- First convoy to the Kolyma: The North-East Polar Expedition, 1932–1933.
- Severnaya Zemlya: the last major discovery.
- The voyage of Sibiryakov, 1932.
- Rusanov, Gerkules and the Northern Sea Route.
- Alexander Vasyl'yevich Kolchak: Arctic scientist and explorer.
- Right place: wrong skeleton! The Musk-Ox.
- The polar voyages of Captain Eduard Dallmann, whaler, trader, explorer 1830–96. (with Reinhard Krause and Peter-Michael Pawlik).
- Aleksandr Stepanovich Kuchin: The Russian who went South with Amundsen.
- Franklin in Siberia? - Lieutenant Bedford Pim's Proposal to Search the Arctic Coast of Siberia, 1851–52.
