= Alexander Konrad =

Russian sailor (1890–1940)

- Born: Alexander Eduardovich Konrad; 1890; St. Petersburg, Russian Empire
- Died: 1940 (aged 49–50); Leningrad, Russian SFSR, Soviet Union
- Occupation: Sailor

Alexander Eduardovich Konrad (Russian: Алекса́ндр Эдуа́рдович Ко́нрад; 1890 – 1940) was a Russian sailor. Along with Valerian Albanov, he was one of two survivors, and the only surviving sailor, of the Brusilov expedition in which 22 people died.

== Biography ==
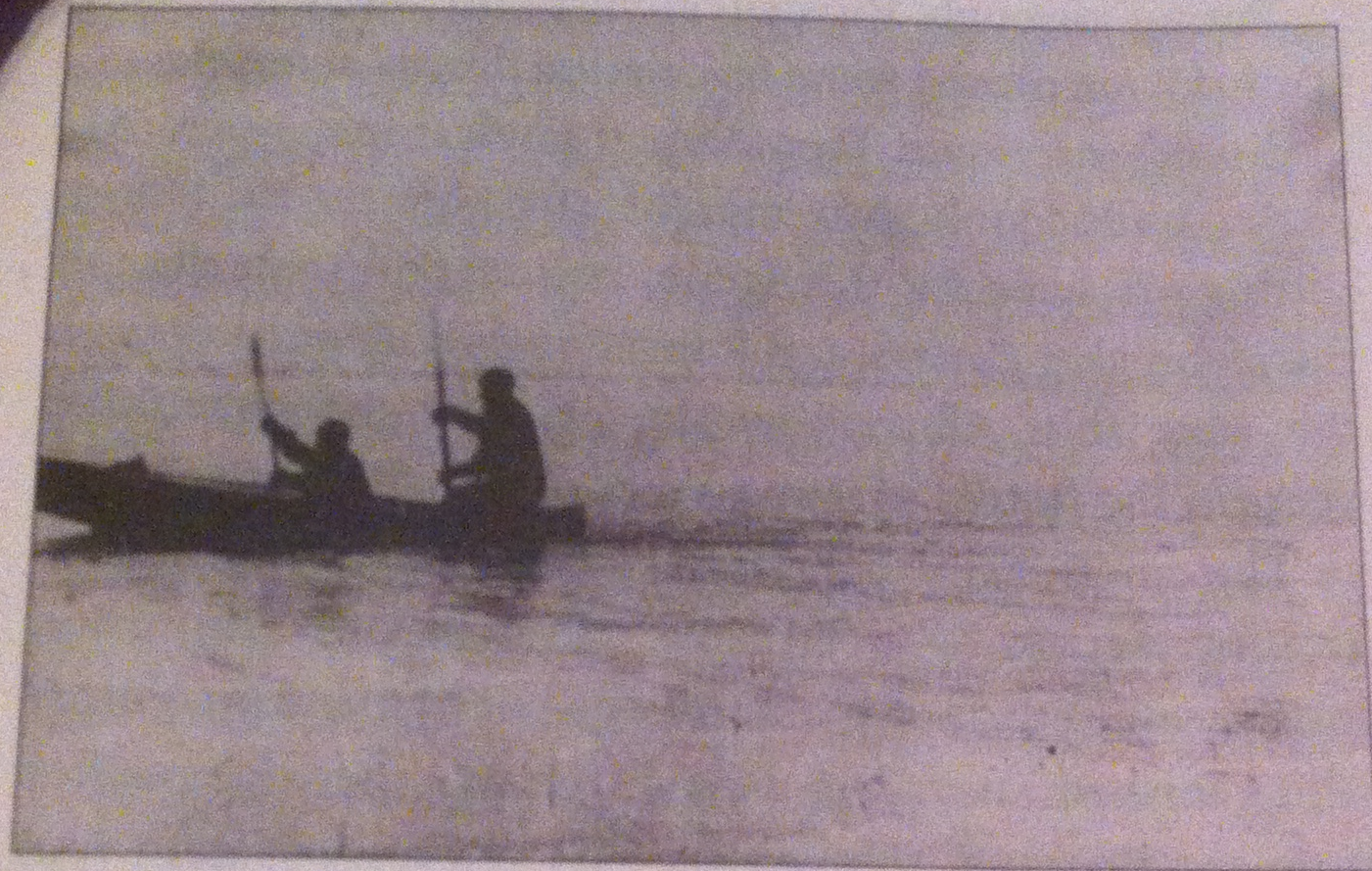
Albanov and Konrad approaching Saint Foka in their kayak, minutes before their rescue

There are no data about Alexander Konrad's birth and childhood.

Alexander Konrad was a member of the crew on the Svyataya Anna, the ship of Georgy Brusilov's 1912 Arctic expedition. The expedition was ill-planned by Captain Brusilov, and the Saint Anna became locked in the polar ice of the Kara Sea in October 1912. Supplies were abundant, so officers and crew prepared themselves for wintering, hoping to be freed in the following year's thaw.

However, during 1913 the sea remained completely frozen. By early 1914 the ship had drifted with the ice NW of Franz Josef Land and did not seem likely to be freed that year either. Albanov, believing that their position was hopeless, requested permission from Captain Brusilov to be relieved from his duties as second-in-command in order to leave the ship with some crewmen and attempt to return to civilization on foot.

Konrad wrote a diary, which is not as extensive as Albanov's story of the ordeal In the Land of White Death, but which gives some interesting clues as to the terrible fate of the other sailors that went along with him following Albanov. Having abandoned the St Anna and headed on skis, sledges and kayaks towards Franz Josef Land, twelve sailors perished shortly after arriving there, when a sudden storm separated the kayaks.

Konrad and Albanov were rescued by the Saint Foka, while they were busy preparing a hut for the winter at Cape Flora in Franz Josef Land.

After the First World War Konrad continued to work as a sailor. In the 1930s he worked as an engineer and mechanic on the Baltic steamship line. In 1939, when he was in his mid-fifties, Alexander Konrad finally completed the Northeast Passage, which had been the original goal of the St Anna. Konrad died of pleurisy in Leningrad (St. Petersburg) in 1940.

After Konrad's death, his relatives donated his 1912-14 diary to the Arctic and Antarctic Museum of St. Petersburg. His diary has been published as an appendix in recent editions of Valerian Albanov's book. Unlike Albanov, Konrad is more descriptive about things like food and polar bear hunting.

In a brief memoir, polar explorer V.I. Akkuratov described Konrad as "stern and reserved". He encouraged Konrad to write a longer account about his experiences in the Arctic, but to no avail. He recalled his icy odyssey with reluctance and inner anguish, says Akkuratov. Konrad spoke sparingly, but warmly of his officer Albanov, yet he refused to tell me anything about Brusilov or his relationship with the navigator. Of young Yerminia Zhdanko, the only woman on board the St. Anna, Konrad preserved a shining memory: "We all loved and worshipped our doctor. This was a strong woman, the hero of the entire crew." (V.I. Akkuratov's interview)

== See also ==
- Georgy Brusilov
- Valerian Albanov
- Svyataya Anna
