= Northbrook Island =

Island located in the Franz Josef Archipelago, Russia

остров Нортбрук
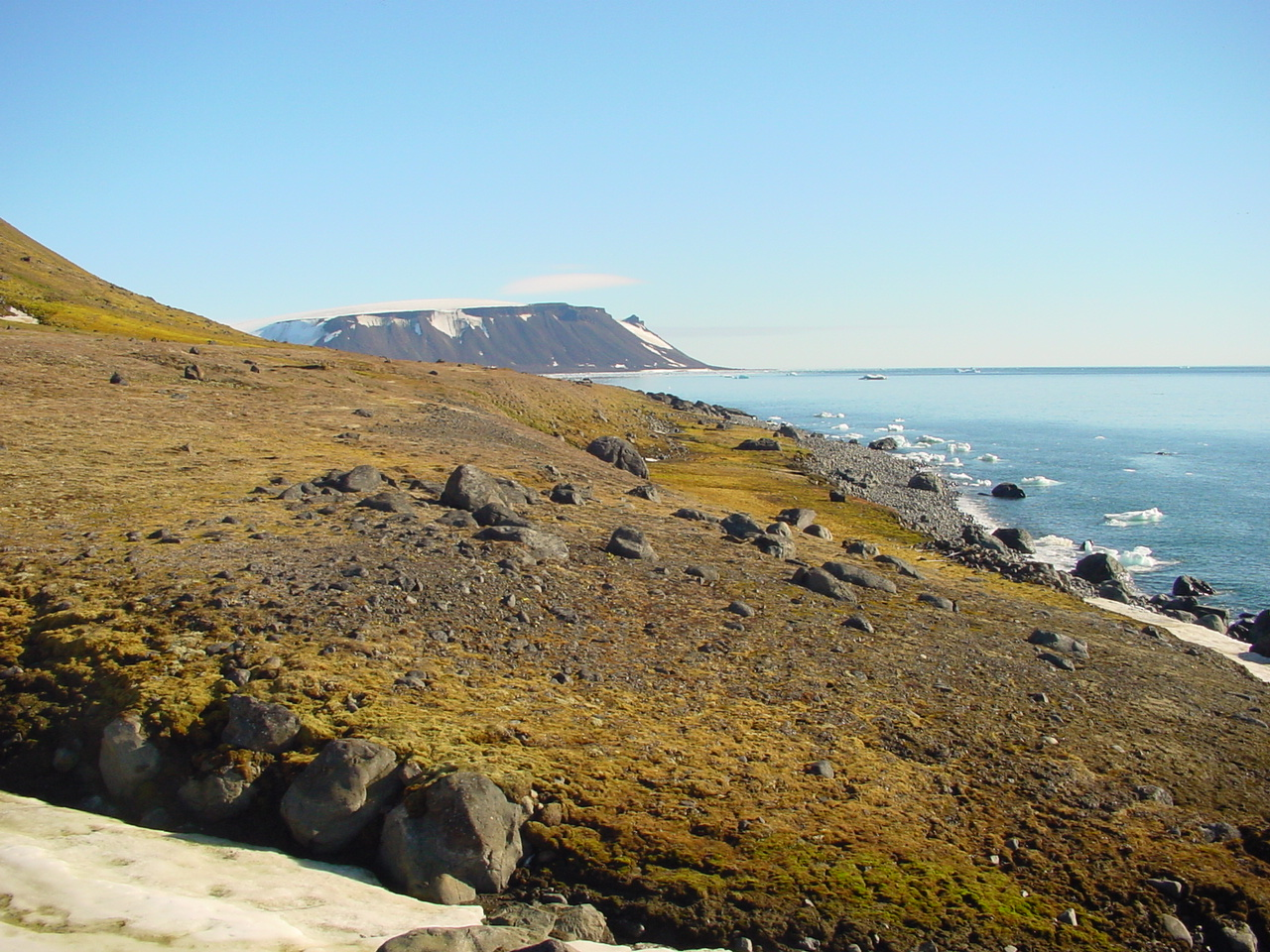
- A coastal view of Northbrook Island

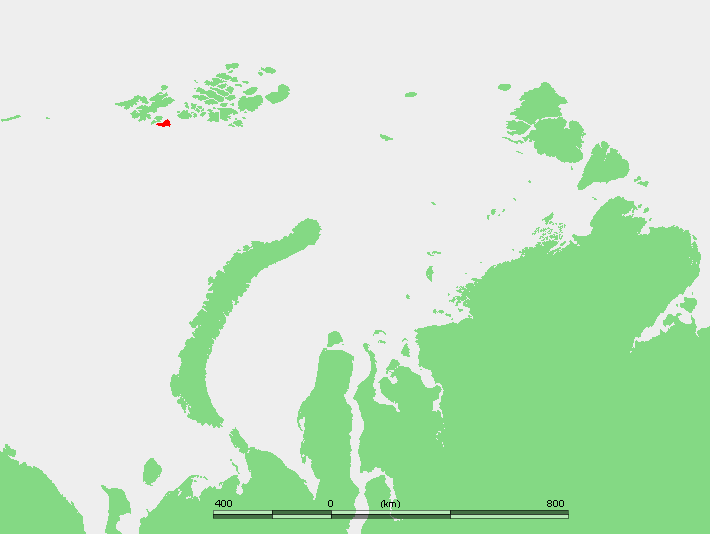
- Location of Northbrook Island in the Franz Josef Archipelago

Geography
- Location: Arctic
- Coordinates: 79.9°N 50.9°E
- Archipelago: Franz Josef Archipelago
- Area: 1,050 km^{2} (410 sq mi)
- Length: 22.4 km (13.92 mi)
- Width: 19.2 km (11.93 mi)
- Highest elevation: 344 m (1129 ft)

Administration
- Russia

Demographics
- Population: 0

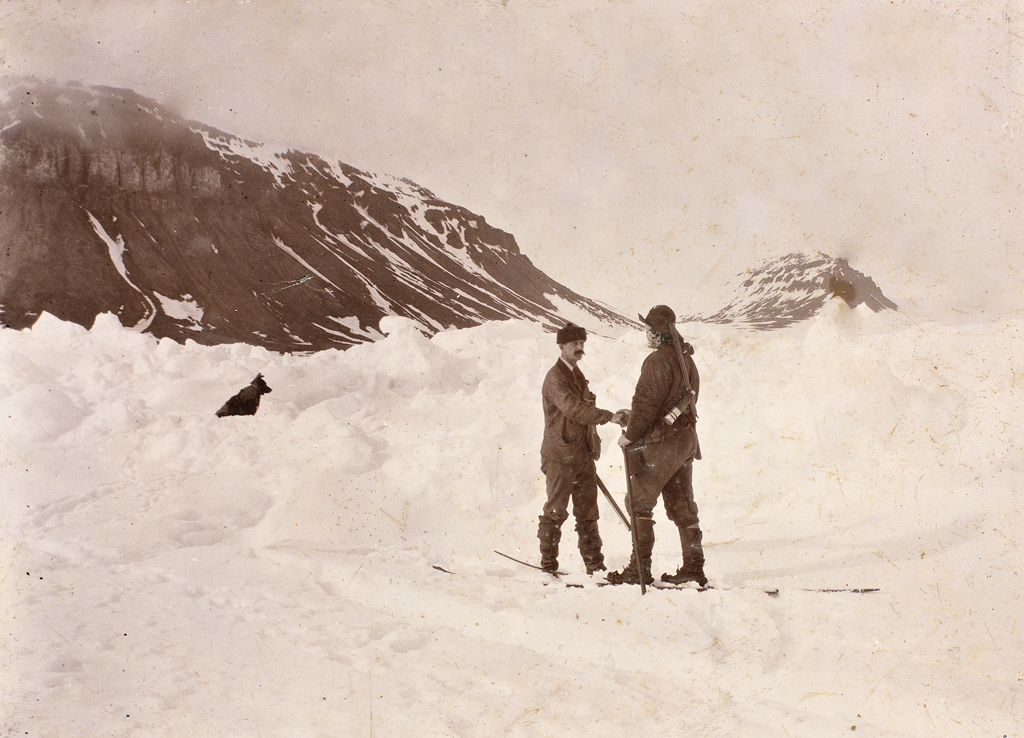
Random meeting between Fridtjof Nansen and Frederick Jackson in 1896.

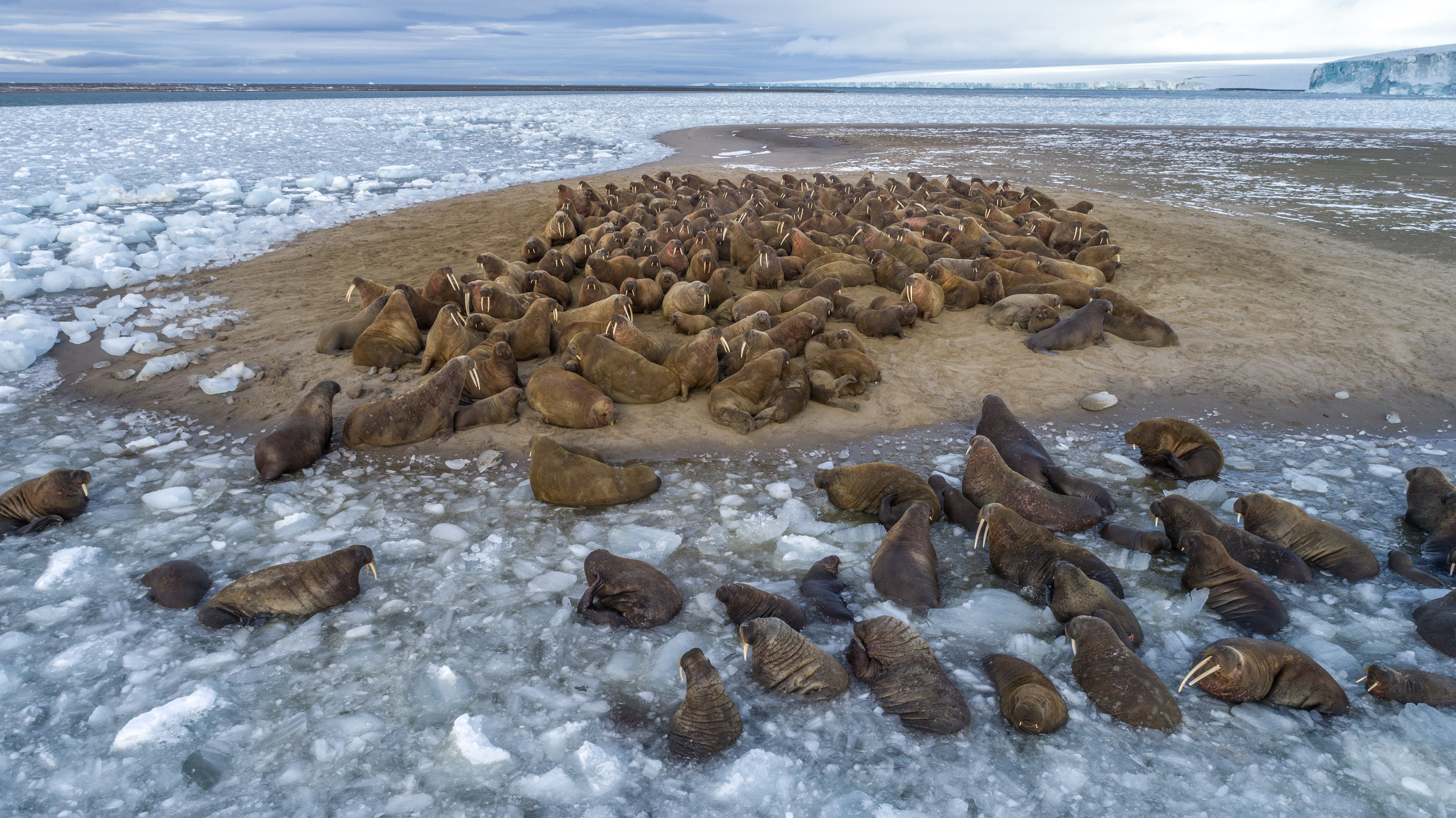
A herd of walruses on Northbrook Island

Northbrook Island (Russian: остров Нортбрук) is an island located in the southern edge of the Franz Josef Archipelago, Russia. Its highest point is 344 m above sea level.

Northbrook Island is one of the most accessible locations in the island group. Thus it often served as a base for polar expeditions in the late 19th and early 20th centuries.

== History ==
The island was discovered in 1880 by English Arctic explorer Benjamin Leigh Smith. It was named after the Earl of Northbrook, who was president of the Royal Geographical Society from 1879 to 1880. The naming of the island was partly due to the insistence of Nikolai Góring, who was among the Earl's entourage during his presidential term.

Cape Flora, located in an unglacierized area in the Southwest of Northbrook Island (79°57′N 50°05′E) camp is historically significant. Benjamin Leigh Smith was shipwrecked at Cape Flora in 1881. A chance encounter between explorers Fridtjof Nansen and Frederick George Jackson took place here in 1896. Jackson was leading the Jackson–Harmsworth expedition, based at Cape Flora, when this meeting occurred, on 17 June 1896.

A cape to the north of the island, at 80°55'N, was named Cape Bruce, after British zoologist and oceanographer William Speirs Bruce, a member of the Jackson–Harmsworth expedition. In 1904, coal was mined about 150 metres (492 feet) up the slopes by explorers of the American Ziegler Polar expedition wintering over after their ship sank at Rudolf Island.

After a gruesome ordeal, navigator Valerian Albanov and sailor Alexander Konrad, the sole survivors of the ill-fated expedition of the Svyataya Anna, ended up on Cape Flora in 1914. Albanov and Konrad were ultimately rescued by the Svyatoy Foka as they were preparing for the winter.

For a long time, Northbrook Island was thought to be a single entity. However during an archeological expedition on the icebreaker Kapitan Dranitsyn in 1985, Ratislav Gaidovskiy found that there was a narrow strait separating it into a large eastern part, and a smaller island, containing Cape Flora, to the west. The existence of this strait was confirmed in 2006 by Stanislav Rumyantsev on the icebreaker Yamal, in 2007 by Børge Ousland and Thomas Ulrich, and in 2012 by the crew of Professor Molchanov and Rossiya. It is assumed that the islands were until recently linked by a tombolo that has since been washed away.

Although various names have been suggested, the land to the west of the discovered strait is now officially called West Northbrook Island (остров Западный Нортбрук), the larger entity to the east is East Northbrook Island (остров Восточный Нортбрук).

== Adjacent islands ==
- Ostrov Robertsona (Остров Робертсона), Robertson Island is a small island lying right off Northbrook Island's eastern shore, close to its easternmost point. This island was named after Scottish Antarctic explorer Captain Thomas Robertson of the 1904 the Scottish National Antarctic Expedition to the South Orkney Islands on ship Scotia.
- Ostrov Novyy lies less than 2 km to the SSW of Robertson, closer to the shore. Both islands are less than 1 km in length.

== Sources ==
- Speak, Peter: William Speirs Bruce NMS Publishing, Edinburgh 2003 ISBN 1-901663-71-X
- All locations:
- Captain Thomas Robertson: , &
