= Valerian Albanov =

Russian navigator (1881–1919)

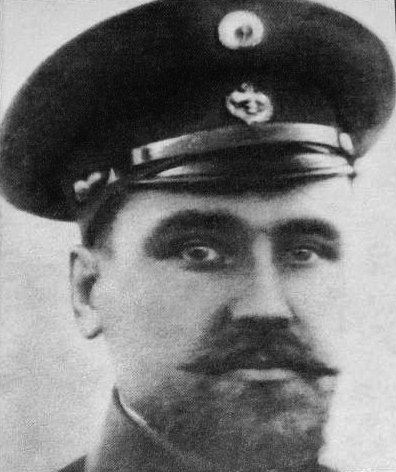
- Born: Valerian Ivanovich Albanov; 26 May 1881; Voronezh, Voronezh Governorate, Russian Empire
- Died: 1919 (aged 38); Achinsk, Yeniseysk, Russia
- Occupation: Navigator
- Known for: Brusilov expedition

Valerian Ivanovich Albanov (Russian: Валериа́н Ива́нович Альбанов; 26 May 1881 – 1919) was a Russian navigator, best known for being one of two survivors of the Brusilov expedition of 1912, in which 22 died.

== Early life ==
Albanov was born in 1881 in Voronezh and was raised by his uncle in the city of Ufa. At the age of seventeen he entered the Naval College at Saint Petersburg, from which he graduated in 1904.

== Brusilov expedition ==
He served on board a number of ships before signing on as navigator aboard the Svyataya Anna, under Captain Georgy Brusilov, for an intended expedition to traverse the Northern Sea Route – a feat which only once before had been successfully completed, by explorer Adolf Erik Nordenskiöld.

The expedition was ill-planned and ill-executed by Brusilov, and the Svyataya Anna became locked in the sea ice of the Kara Sea in October 1912. Supplies were abundant, so officers and crew prepared themselves for wintering, hoping to be freed in the following year's thaw. However, during 1913, the sea remained completely frozen. By early 1914, the ship had drifted with the ice northwest of Franz Josef Land, and did not seem likely to be freed that year either.

=== Journey across the ice ===
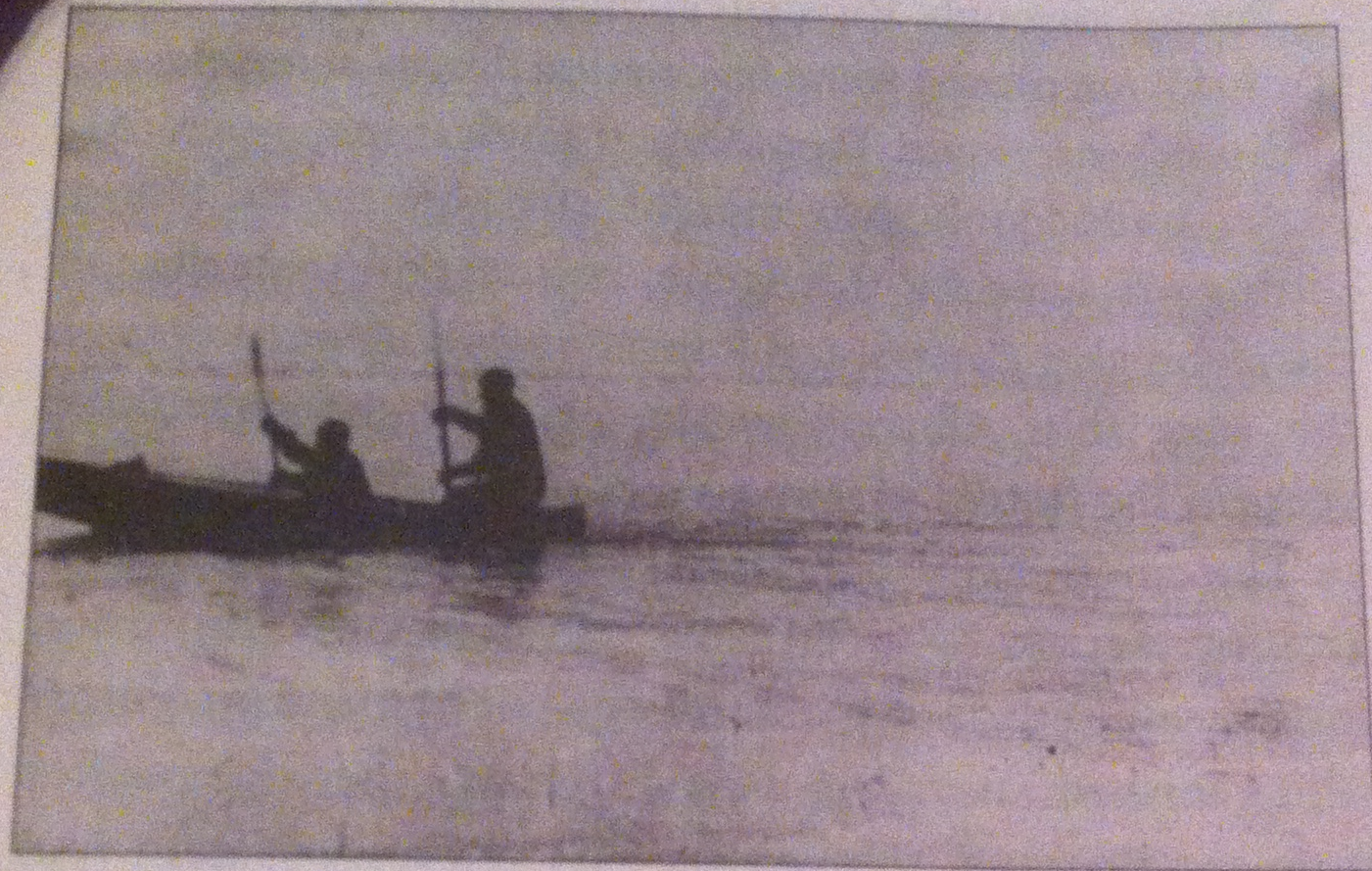
Albanov and Alexander Konrad approaching Svyatoy Foka in their kayak, minutes before their rescue

Albanov, believing that their position was hopeless, requested permission from Captain Brusilov to be relieved from his duties as second-in-command to leave the ship and attempt to return to civilization on foot. Albanov's aim was to reach Hvidtenland, the northeasternmost island group of Franz Josef Land. He used Fridtjof Nansen's inaccurate map, full of dotted lines where the archipelago was still unexplored.

Thirteen other crewmen accompanied Albanov when he travelled south-westwards by ski, sledge, and kayak. The progress was difficult because of the cracks in the ice, the numerous polynias and the abundance of ridges which made progress slow. After a long and gruesome ordeal, only Albanov and one crewman, Alexander Konrad, made it to Cape Flora on Northbrook Island, where they knew that Frederick George Jackson had left provisions and a hut in a previous expedition. Albanov and Konrad were rescued by timely arrival of the Svyatoy Foka, while they were preparing for the winter.

== Later life ==
Albanov was later convinced to write up his memoirs of his adventure, and they were first published in Saint Petersburg in 1917. He returned to the sea, but died only a couple years later.

Accounts of his death vary, with some having him die of typhoid, and some reporting that he was killed in the explosion of a railway wagon carrying munitions in Achinsk, in the Governorate of Yeniseysk in Siberia.

== Legacy ==
The data about the drift of the Svyataya Anna on the pack ice of the Kara Sea supplied by Albanov were carefully studied in 1924, by Soviet oceanographer Vladimir Wiese. He detected an odd deviation of the path of the ship's drift caused by certain variations of the patterns of sea and ice currents. Wiese deemed that the deviation was caused by the presence of an undiscovered island whose coordinates he was able to calculate with precision thanks to Albanov's data. This island was later discovered and named Wiese Island.

In 1975, Arctic expert William Barr wrote, "The name of Valerian Ivanovich Albanov must be ranked among those of the immortals of polar exploration."

A glacier in October Revolution Island, in the Severnaya Zemlya group has been named after Valerian Albanov. A Russian expedition in September 2010, following the route of the crew members left behind, found some remainders of them: a human skeleton, a watch, snowshoes, a knife, a spoon with a sailor's initials, and sunglasses made from empty rum bottles' glass in the shores of Franz Josef Land.

The 2006 V/Vm album White Death, which references the Brusilov expedition, features a picture of Albanov on its cover art.
