= Georgy Brusilov =

Russian naval officer (1884–1914)

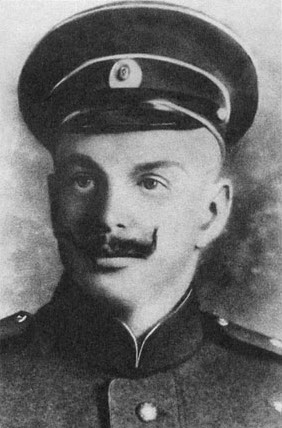
- Born: May 19, 1884; Nikolayev, Russian Empire
- Disappeared: 1914 (aged 29–30)
- Occupation: naval officer

Georgy Lvovich Brusilov (Russian: Гео́ргий Льво́вич Бруси́лов; May 19, 1884 – disappeared in 1914) was a Russian naval officer of the Imperial Russian Navy and an Arctic explorer. His father, Lev Brusilov, was also a naval officer.

In 1912, Brusilov led a maritime expedition which was intended to explore and map a route from the Atlantic Ocean to the Pacific via a northeast passage, also called the Northern Sea Route. His expedition disappeared almost without a trace, and despite searches its ultimate fate was unknown until 2010.

== Arctic expeditions ==
=== Arctic Ocean Hydrographic Expedition ===
During 1910–1911, Georgy Brusilov participated in the Arctic Ocean Hydrographic Expedition of the Russian Hydrographic Service on icebreakers Taymyr and Vaygach, visiting the Chukchi Sea and East Siberian Sea.

=== Brusilov Expedition ===
In 1912, Brusilov commanded the Brusilov Expedition using the brig St. Anna, which was intended to travel from the Atlantic Ocean to the Pacific by the Northern Sea Route. One of the members of the expedition was a 22-year-old nurse, Yerminia Zhdanko, daughter of a general who had been a hero in the Russo-Japanese War.

By mid-September, Captain Brusilov's expedition reached the Kara Sea through the Yugorsky Shar Strait, but soon became icebound near the western shores of the Yamal Peninsula and was drifting helplessly towards the north. Brusilov wintered in the hope of seeing his ship freed in the next year's thaw. However, the summer of 1913 came and the St. Anna remained locked in sea ice. It drifted far north with the pack ice, leaving the Kara Sea and entering the Arctic Ocean. Captain Brusilov became ill and was bedridden for months. Many members of the crew succumbed to scurvy.

During the spring of 1914, Brusilov's lieutenant, Valerian Albanov, along with some members of the St.Anna's crew, abandoned the ship and tried to walk south over the drifting ice. The only two survivors – navigator Valerian Albanov and sailor Alexander Konrad – managed to reach Cape Flora in Franz Josef Land. There they were rescued by the expedition of Georgy Sedov on the ship St. Foka.

== Search and partial discovery ==
The almost impossible task of searching for Brusilov (and geologist Vladimir Rusanov from another expedition), was entrusted to Otto Sverdrup with the ship Eklips in 1914–15. His efforts were unsuccessful and the fate of the Brusilov expedition was unknown until 2010.

In 2010, explorers announced that they had found the bones of a crew-member of Brusilov's expedition.

Later in 2010, explorers announced the finding of a crew-member's logbook and various other artifacts on the shores of Franz Josef Land.

== See also ==
- List of people who disappeared mysteriously at sea
