= Brusilov expedition =

Russian maritime expedition to the Arctic

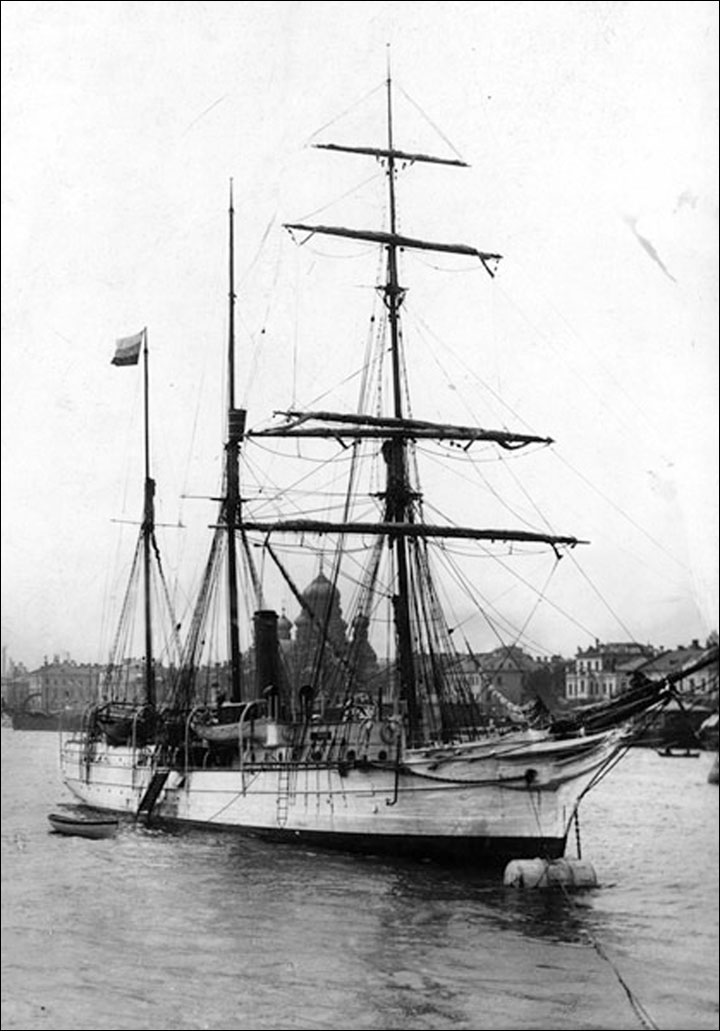
Svyataya Anna

The Brusilov expedition (Russian: Экспедиция Брусилова) was a Russian maritime expedition to the Arctic led by Captain Georgy Brusilov, which set out in 1912 to explore and map a route from the Atlantic Ocean to the Pacific via a northeast passage known as the Northern Sea Route. The expedition was ill-planned and ill-executed by Brusilov, and disappeared without a trace. Earlier searches were unsuccessful, and the fate of the ship and its crew is still not known.

One of the members of the expedition was the second Russian woman to go to the Arctic, Yerminia Zhdanko, a 22-year-old nurse and daughter of a general of the Russo-Japanese War.

== Expedition ==
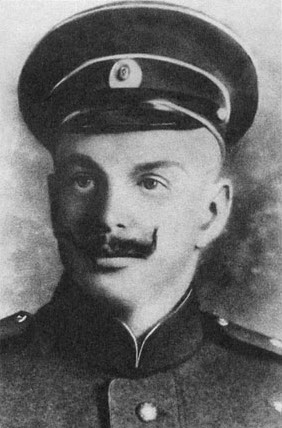
Captain Georgy Brusilov

Captain Georgy Brusilov's vessel Svyataya Anna, set out from Alexandrovsk on 28 August 1912. It was so late in the summer that by October the ship became locked in the polar ice of the Kara Sea off the Yamal Peninsula. Supplies were abundant, and officers and crew prepared themselves for wintering over, hoping to be freed in the following year's thaw.

However, during 1913, the sea remained completely frozen. By early 1914 the Svyataya Anna had drifted far north in lazy zigzags with the Arctic ice. In the summer that year she reached 83° of latitude, NW of Franz Josef Land, and had no chance to be freed in 1914 either. To make things worse, captain and crew had succumbed to scurvy.

Navigator and second-in-command Valerian Albanov, believing that their position was hopeless, requested permission from Captain Brusilov to be relieved from his duties as second-in-command in order to leave the ship and attempt to return to civilization on foot. Albanov hoped to reach Northbrook Island in Franz Josef Land, where he knew that Fridtjof Nansen had been rescued in 1896. He expected to find a hut and a depot left there by Nansen's rescuer, explorer Frederick George Jackson. He used Nansen's inaccurate map, (Note: Nansen's map from 1897) full of dotted lines where the archipelago was still unexplored.

Albanov and twelve companions left the ship, travelling with home-made sledges and kayaks. After a gruesome ninety-day ordeal owing to difficult ice conditions, only Albanov and Alexander Konrad survived to reach Northbrook Island, where they were rescued by the Svyatoy Foka of the Sedov expedition.

== Aftermath ==
Albanov wrote a gripping account of his ordeal, In the Land of White Death, published in Russia in 1917.

The Svyataya Anna was never seen again. She may have sunk, crushed by the polar ice. It was thought she may have been carried by the polar ice drift until she, like the Fram, broke free on the other side of the Arctic. Two Russian scholars, D. Alekseev and P. Novokshonov, have suggested that, if she did survive the ice, she may have been sunk by a German submarine during the campaign of Spring 1915.

In 1914–1915 Otto Sverdrup led a search-and-rescue expedition aboard the ship Eklips in the Kara Sea on behalf of the Russian Imperial Navy. He aimed to find two missing arctic expeditions, those of Captain Brusilov on the Svyataya Anna and Vladimir Rusanov on the Gerkules, but found no trace of either.

Valerian Albanov made repeated requests to Arctic explorer and Admiral Alexander Kolchak to launch a search expedition for the Svyataya Anna. In December 1919 Albanov traveled to Omsk to confer with Kolchak, but the political turmoil in Russia at the time made a relief mission impossible.

Explorers announced in 2010 that they had found the bones of one of Albanov's companions. Later that year, a sailor's journal and various other artifacts were found, also on Franz Josef Land. Among the finds were a pair of sunglasses, which matched a description in Albanov's journal: "We had no effective sunglasses. Our mechanic had fabricated some with pieces of green glass scavenged from gin bottles, but they were essentially useless."

In 2006, British musician V/Vm a.k.a. The Caretaker released an album named White Death in reference to the expedition, with a picture of Valerian Albanov as its cover art.
