= Georgy Sedov =

Russian Arctic explorer

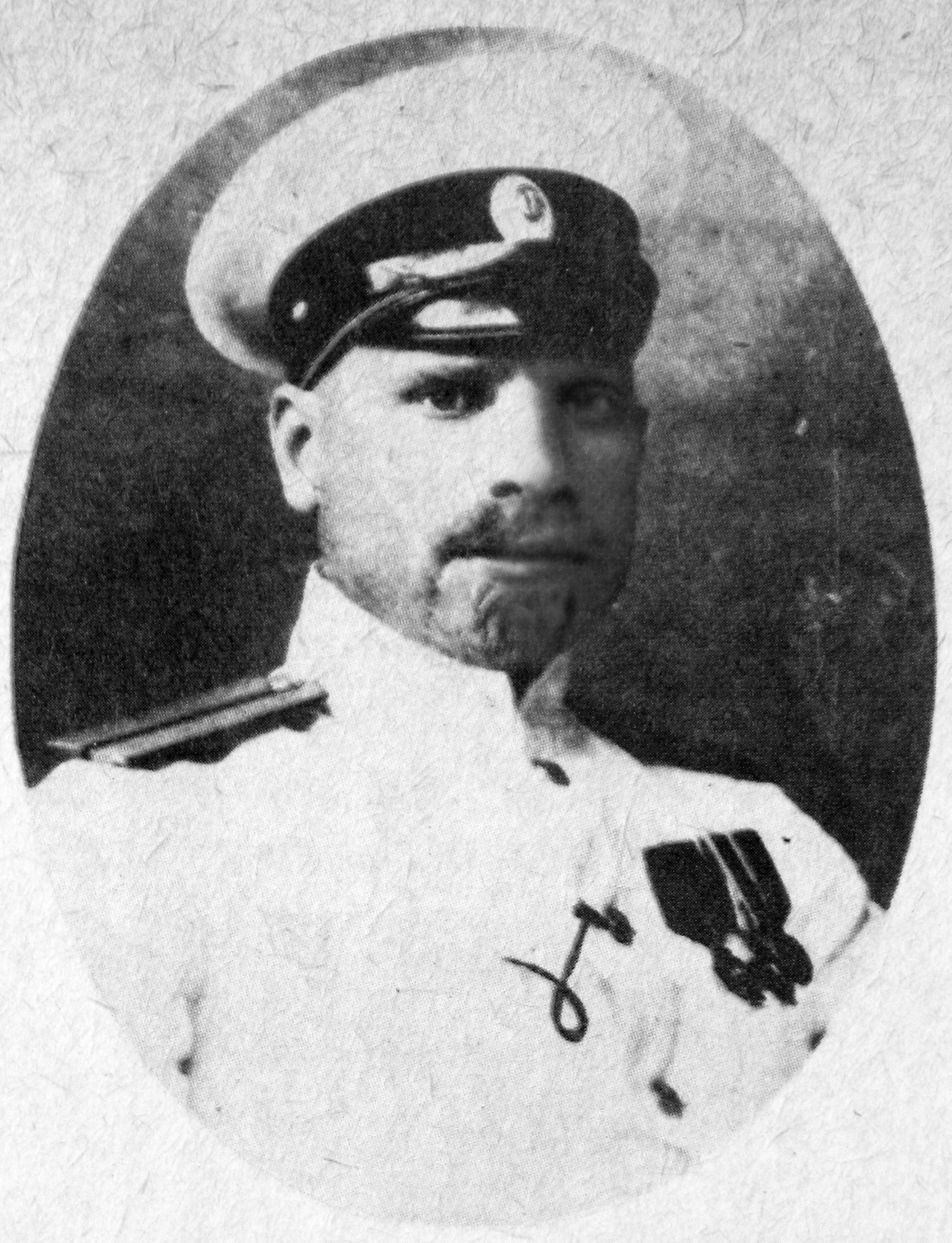
Georgy Sedov

Georgy Yakovlevich Sedov (Russian: Георгий Яковлевич Седов; 5 May [O.S. 23 April] 1877 – 5 March [O.S. 20 February] 1914) was a Russian Arctic explorer.

Sedov was born in the village of Krivaya Kosa of Taganrog district (now Novoazovskyi Raion, Donetsk Oblast) to a fisherman's family. In 1898, he finished navigation courses in Rostov-on-Don and acquired the rank of long voyage navigator. In 1901, he took an external degree at a naval college, passed all the exams, and was promoted to the rank of lieutenant.

From 1902 to 1903, Sedov participated in a hydrographic expedition in the Arctic Ocean. In 1905, during the Russo-Japanese War, he was in charge of a torpedo boat. In 1909, he led the expedition that would later describe the mouth of the Kolyma River. The following year, Sedov explored the Krestovaya Bay on Novaya Zemlya.

In 1912, he proposed a sleigh expedition for reaching the North Pole. The Tsarist government refused to finance this project and the expedition was organized with help from independent sources. On August 14 (27), 1912, Sedov's ship Svyatoy Muchenik Foka (Saint Phocas the Martyr) left Arkhangelsk and had to stay for the winter near Novaya Zemlya because of impassable ice. The expedition reached Franz Josef Land only in August 1913; however, it had to stay for the second winter in the Tikhaya Bay due to lack of coal.

On February 2 (15), 1914, Sedov (already sick with scurvy) and his accompanying seamen G. Linnik and A. Pustotniy set off for the North Pole with their draft dogs. Before reaching Rudolf Island, Sedov died at sea and was buried at Cape Auk on the island. On the way back, at Franz Josef Land, the Svyatoy Foka rescued two survivors of the Brusilov expedition, including Valerian Albanov. As part of the search for the Sedov expedition, Jan Nagórski made the first airplane flights over the Arctic, gaining valuable experience for later aeronautical expeditions to the region.

Two gulfs and a peak on Novaya Zemlya, a glacier and a cape on Franz Josef Land, an island in the Barents Sea, and a cape in Antarctica bear Sedov's name. There was also a steam icebreaker Georgy Sedov. Today, the sail training barque STS Sedov bears his name.

== Gallery ==
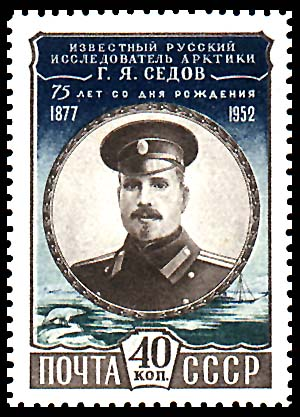
A 1952 U.S.S.R. postage stamp issued in honor of the 75th anniversary of Sedov's birth

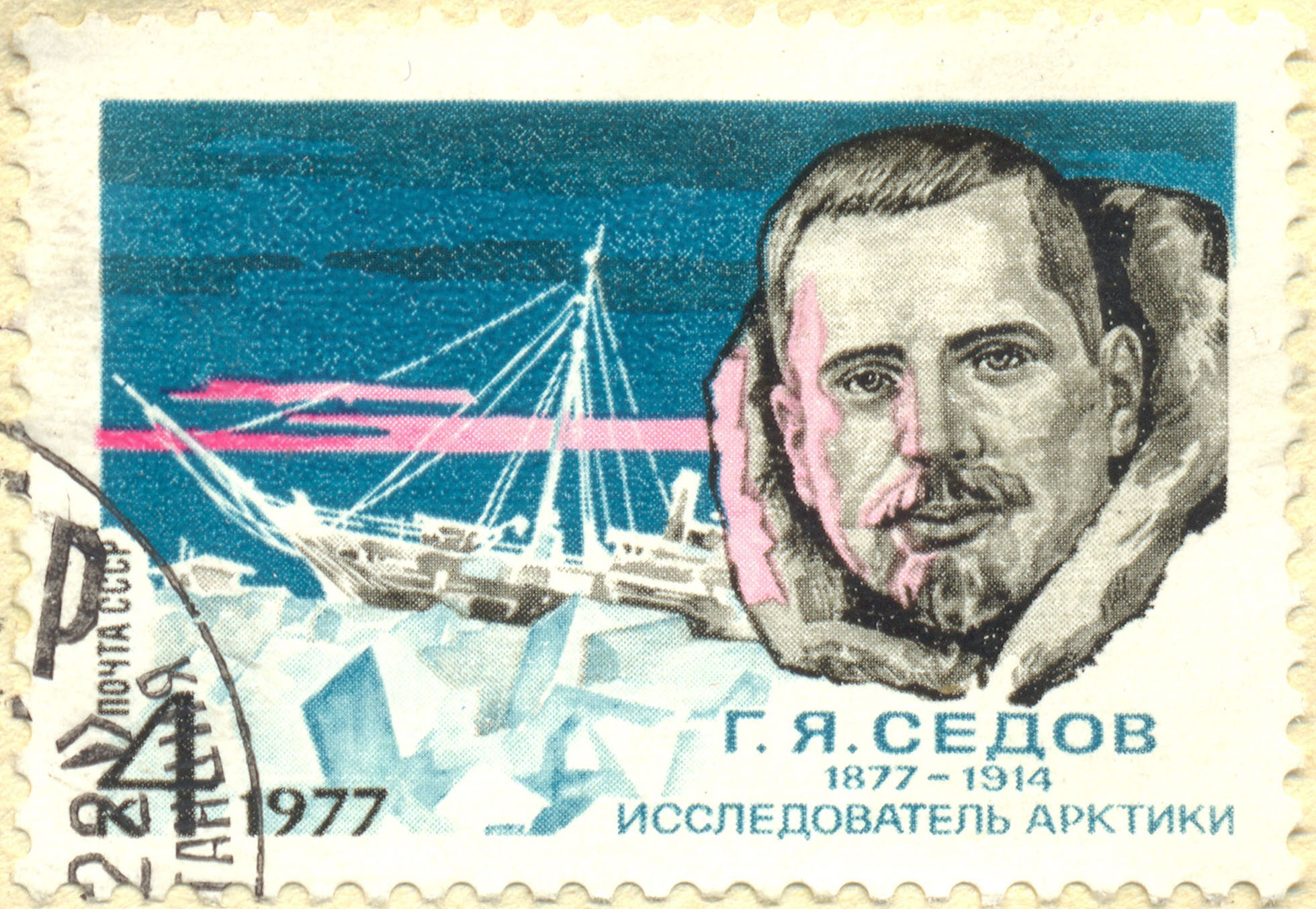
A 1977 U.S.S.R. postage stamp issued in honor of the centennial of Sedov's birth

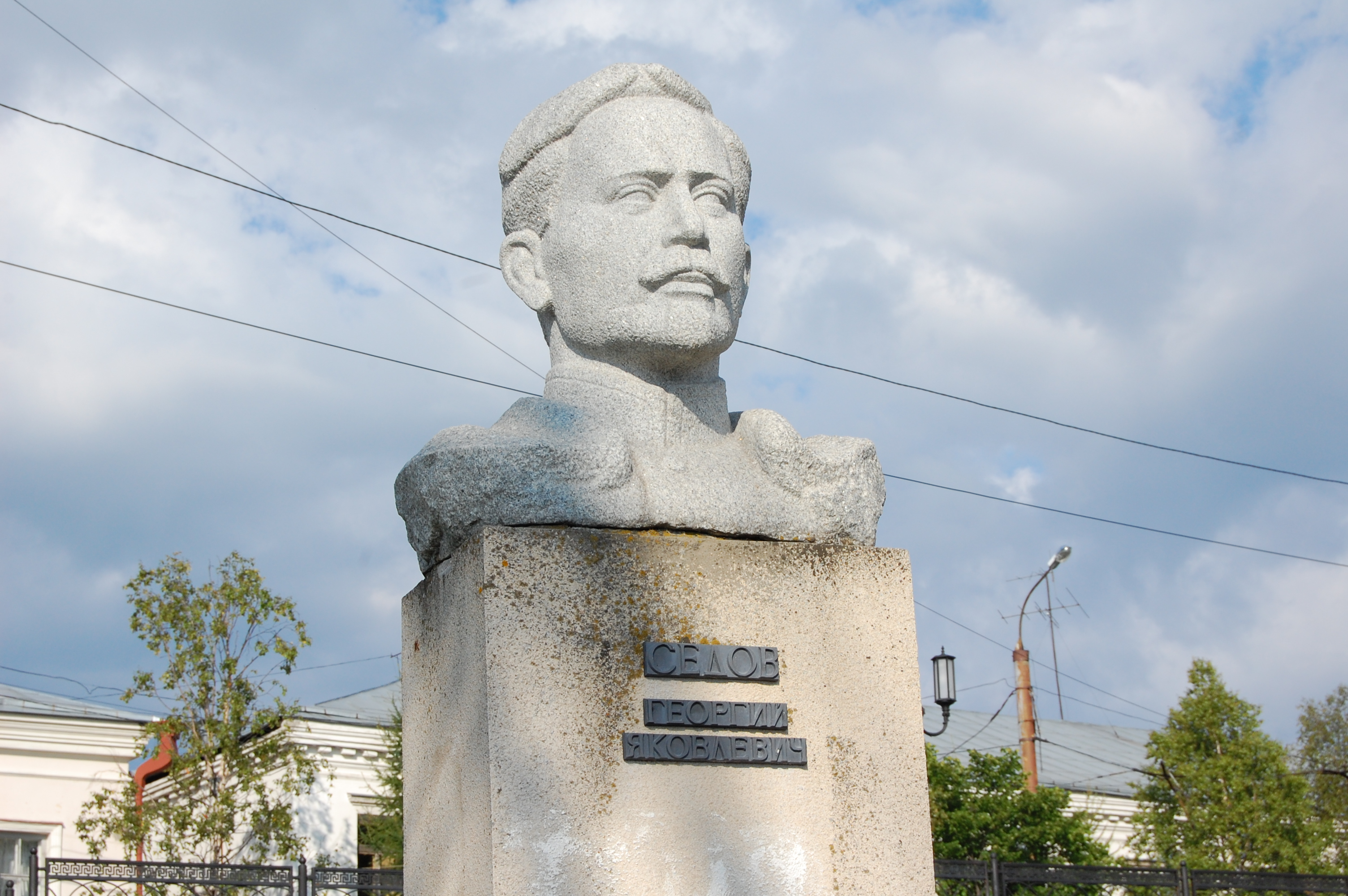
Bust of Georgy Sedov in Arkhangelsk

== See also ==
- Jan Nagórski
- Professor Vize
- Nikolai Pinegin

== Sources ==
- Artykuł w Bolshoy Sovetskoy Enciklopedii (in Russian)
