= Vladimir Rusanov =

Russian geologist and Arctic explorer

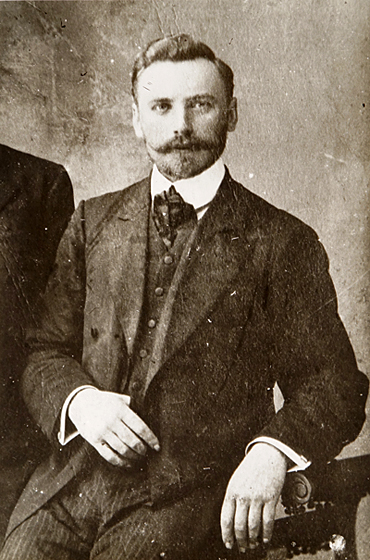
- Born: 3 November [O.S. 22 October] 1875; Oryol, Russia
- Died: c. 1913 (aged 37–38); Kara Sea, Russia
- Occupations: Geologist, Arctic explorer

Vladimir Alexandrovich Rusanov (Russian: Влади́мир Алекса́ндрович Руса́нов; 3 November [O.S. 22 October] 1875 – c. 1913) was a Russian geologist and Arctic explorer.

== Early life ==
Rusanov was born in a merchant's family in Oryol, Russia. His early life was marred by hardship when his father went bankrupt before dying while Rusanov was still a child. Rusanov's widowed mother struggled to bring up the family but managed to send her son to the Oryol Gymnasium (Grammar School). Rusanov however began to be involved with Marxist revolutionaries. He was arrested by the police. The police could not prove anything, yet still informed the gymnasium school leading to his expulsion. Rusanov afterwards joined a theological seminary.

Rusanov entered the natural sciences faculty at Kiev University in 1897. In Kiev, he was involved in Marxist activities and was again expelled and briefly imprisoned. While in jail, he was inspired by books about Fridtjof Nansen's Arctic voyages and resolved to become a polar explorer. Rusanov was released in 1899 but subject to police over watch.

Sent into internal exile in Siberia, Rusanov became a statistician for the local council in Ust Syslosk (renamed Syktyvkar in 1930), where he conducted scientific observations in addition to his duties. At the end of his term he was not allowed to reside in any major Russian city, depriving him of a chance to further his education, he therefore went to study in Paris at the Sorbonne. Russanov specialised in geology and wrote his thesis on the geology of Novaya Zemlya. He was allowed to return to Russia in 1907.

== Arctic Exploration ==
In 1909–1911 V. A. Rusanov carried out explorations in Novaya Zemlya. He was helped by Tyko Vylka, his guide, who later became the Chairman of the Novaya Zemlya Soviet (local Council).

In 1912 Rusanov had been appointed to command a government expedition to Svalbard to investigate the coal potential. He sailed from Aleksandrovsk-na-Murmane (now Polyarnyy, near Murmansk) on 26 June on ship Gerkules under Captain Alexander Kuchin, Roald Amundsen's South Pole navigator. The personnel consisted of thirteen men and one woman, Rusanov's French fiancée Julie Jean. Apart from Rusanov there was another geologist and a zoologist.

At the end of a successful summer's field work, three members of the expedition (the geologist, the zoologist, and the ship's bosun) returned to Russia via Grønfjorden in Norway. The remaining ten, however, without consultation with the authorities in St. Petersburg, set off with Rusanov in an rash attempt at reaching the Pacific Ocean via the Northern Sea Route. Their ship Gerkules however was too small for the kind of expedition Rusanov had in mind.

The last to be heard of Rusanov's expedition was a telegram left at Matochkin Shar on Novaya Zemlya, which reached St. Petersburg on 27 September 1912. In it, Rusanov indicated that he intended rounding the northern tip of Novaya Zemlya and heading east across the Kara Sea but nothing was heard from the Gerkules thereafter. He and his 11-man team, including Alexander Kuchin, disappeared without trace a year later in the Kara Sea, off the northern coast of Siberia.

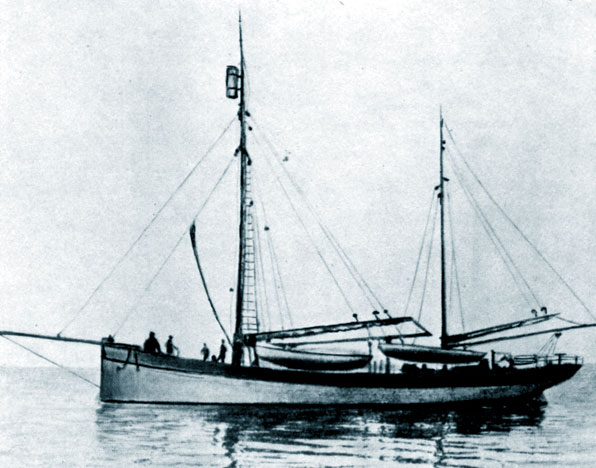
Hercules ketch

In 1914–15 the almost impossible task of searching for Rusanov (as well as for the similarly disappeared Captain Georgy Brusilov and the Brusilov Expedition), was entrusted to Otto Sverdrup with the ship Eklips. His efforts, however, were unsuccessful.

In 1937, the Arctic Institute of the Soviet Union organized an expedition to the Nordenskiöld Archipelago on the ship Toros. Relics of the ill-fated Rusanov's expedition were found on Popova-Chukchina Island, located at (74° 56'N, 86° 18'E) off Kolosovykh Island in the Kolosovykh group.

== Commemoration ==
A glacier in October Revolution Island, in the Severnaya Zemlya group has been named after Vladimir Rusanov.

Rusanov is dutifully remembered in the city of his birth, Oryol, where the Rusanova Street is named after him. There is also a museum in the house where he spent his childhood and youth at no. 43 Rusanova Street. The cabin Rusanov built on Svalbard in 1912 (Rusanovodden) was turned into a small self-guided museum.

The Soviet-era icebreaker Vladimir Rusanov and the Yamalmax LNG carrier have been named after him.

Soviet coal mining on Svalbard began in 1932.

== Sources ==
- William Barr, Otto Sverdrup to the rescue of the Russian Imperial Navy.
- William Barr, The First Tourist Cruise in the Soviet Arctic.
