= Frederick George Jackson =

English Arctic explorer (1860–1938)

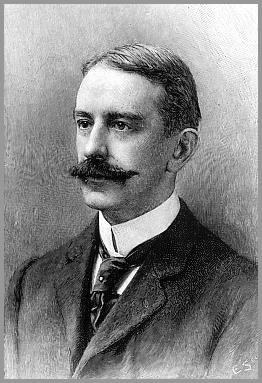
- Jackson in Harper's Magazine, September 1898
- Born: 6 March 1860; Alcester Lodge, Alcester, Warwickshire
- Died: 13 March 1938 (aged 78)
- Education: Denstone College; Edinburgh University

Frederick George Jackson (6 March 1860 – 13 March 1938) was an English Arctic explorer remembered for his expedition to Franz Josef Land, when he located the missing Norwegian explorer Fridtjof Nansen.

== Biography ==
=== Early life ===
Jackson was born the son of George Frederick and Mary Elizabeth Jackson at Alcester Lodge, Alcester, Warwickshire, England and educated at Denstone College in Staffordshire and Edinburgh University.

=== Career ===
His first voyage in Arctic waters was on a whaling cruise in 1886–1887, and in 1893, he made a sledge-journey of 3,000 miles across the frozen tundra of Siberia lying between the Ob and the Pechora. His narrative of this journey was published under the title of The Great Frozen Land (1895).

==== Jackson–Harmsworth expedition ====
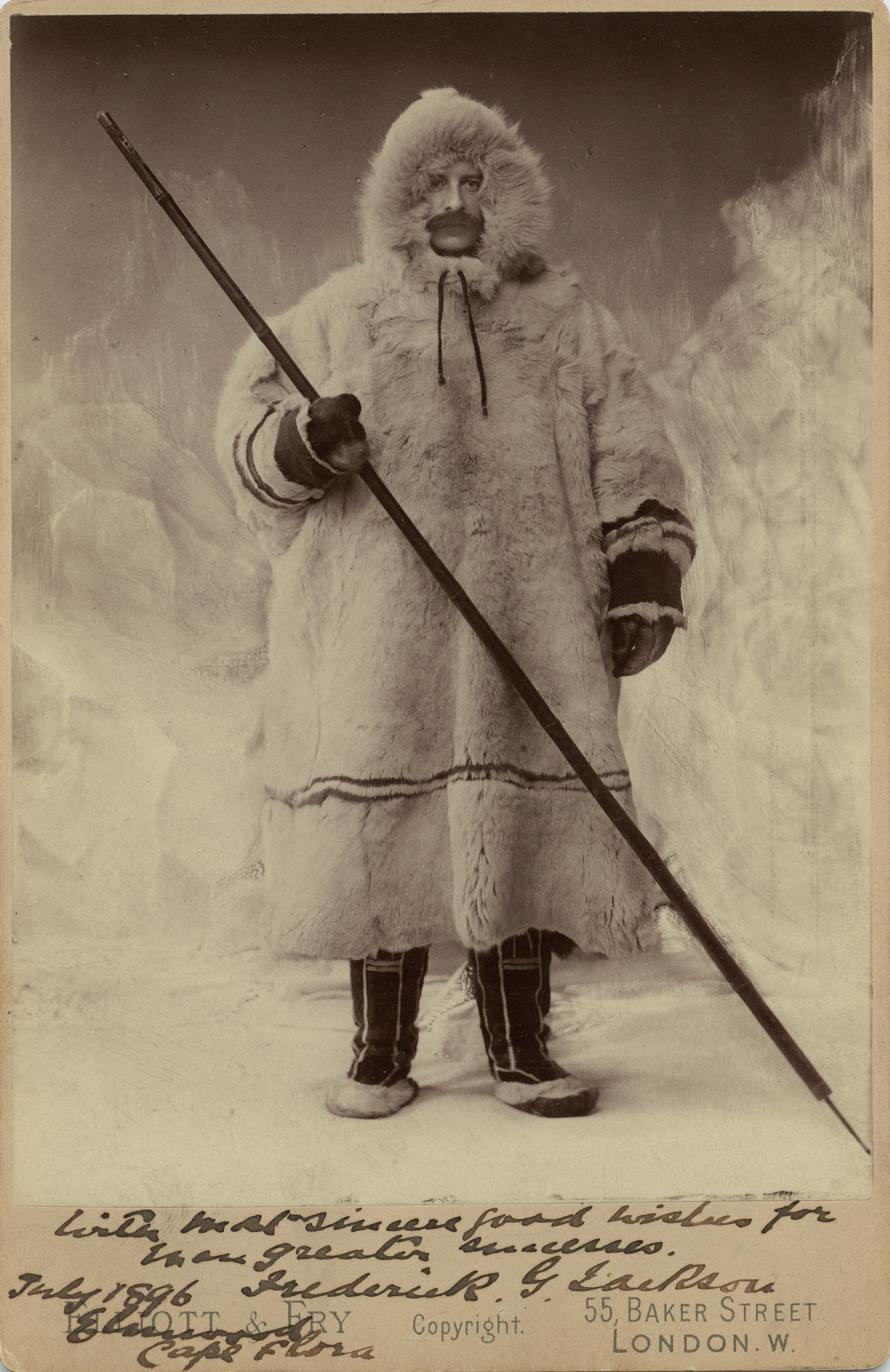
In winter gear, 1896

On his return, he was given the command of the Jackson–Harmsworth expedition of 1894. Sponsored by the Royal Geographical Society, this expedition was to conduct general exploration of Franz Josef Land. Whilst leading this expedition, Jackson and his men met by chance on 17 June 1896 the Norwegian arctic explorer Fridtjof Nansen and his companion Hjalmar Johansen, who had not been heard of for three years and were presumed dead, but were in fact trying to reach Spitsbergen by kayak. Jackson informed him that they were in fact on Franz Josef Land, and with Jackson's help, Nansen and Johansen returned home aboard the expedition's supply ship Windward on 7 August. Jackson and his party wintered at their camp according to plan.

The Jackson–Harmsworth expedition proved that Franz Josef Land is nothing more than an archipelago of small islands.

In recognition of his services he received a knighthood of the first class of the Norwegian Royal Order of St Olaf in 1898, and was awarded the gold medal of the Paris Geographical Society in 1899. His account of the expedition was published under the title of A Thousand Days in the Arctic (1899).

=== Later career ===
Jackson was commissioned as an officer in the 5th (Militia) Battalion, Manchester Regiment as a captain on 5 March 1900. He saw active service in South Africa during the Second Boer War, and following the end of the war, he stayed on as a militia officer in the battalion. He transferred to the 4th Battalion, East Surrey Regiment in 1905, serving in the First World War and reaching the rank of Major. He resigned his commission in 1917. After being invalided home he commanded Southwark Recruiting District for two years, followed by commands of a number of prisoner of war camps in Germany.

His travels also include a journey across the Australian deserts.

He is buried in the churchyard of St Michael and St Mary Magdalene at Easthampstead in Berkshire, and there is a memorial plaque on the wall of the church near the front.

One of the headlands discovered on the expedition was named St Chad's Head (Denstone College was originally called St Chad's College), and the sledge used was presented to Denstone College.
