= Nagurskoye (air base) =

Russian Arctic military airfield

Nagurskoye Нагурское
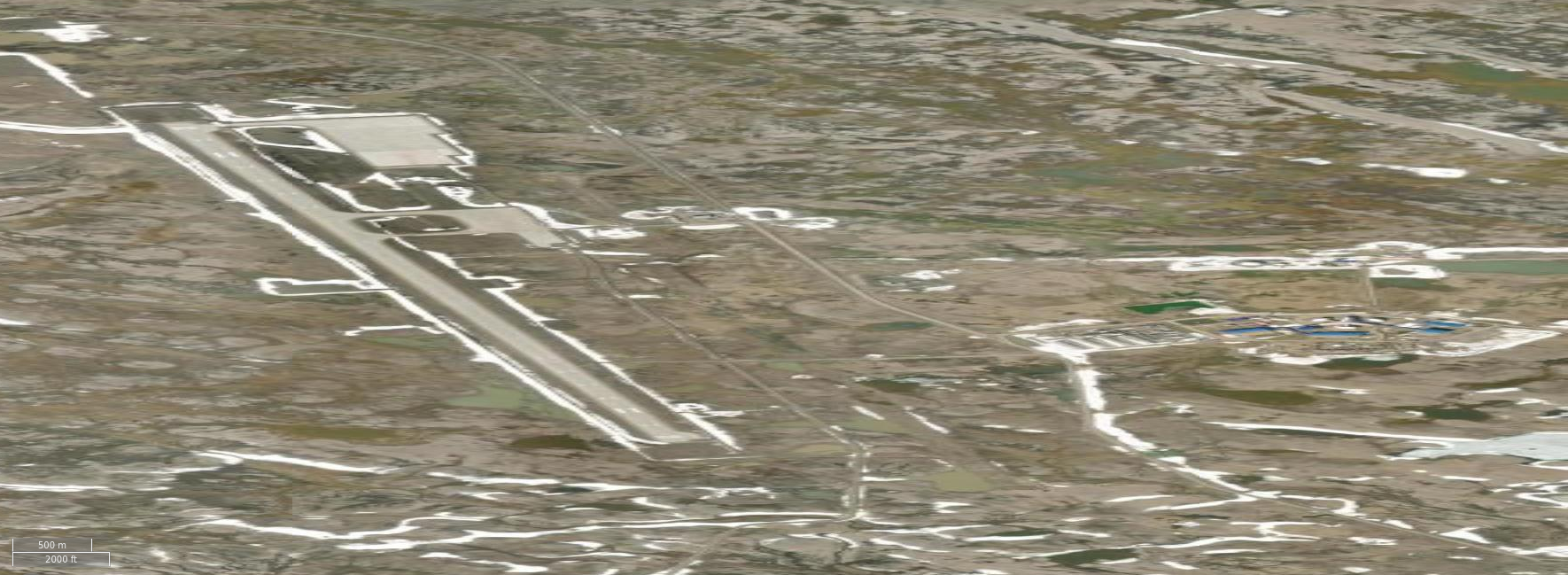
- Satellite imagery of Nagurskoye airfield

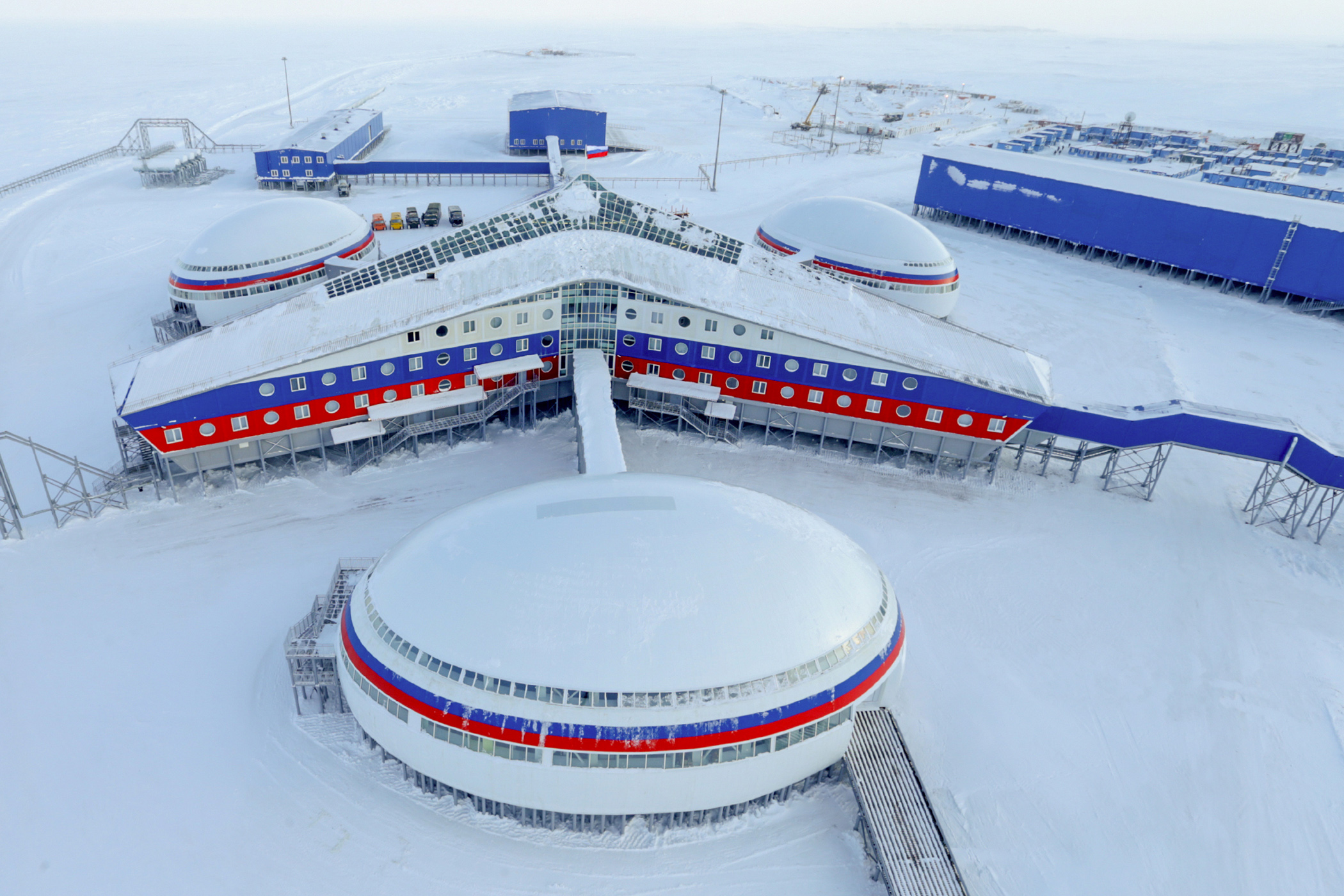
- IATA: none; ICAO: UODN

Summary
- Airport type: Military
- Operator: Russian Air Force
- Location: Alexandra Land, Franz Josef Land
- Opened: 1947
- Elevation AMSL: 59 ft / 18 m
- Coordinates: 80°47′55″N 47°28′47″E

Map
- Location within Russia

Runways
Direction	Length		Surface
Direction	ft	m	Surface
14/32	11,500	3,500	Gravel

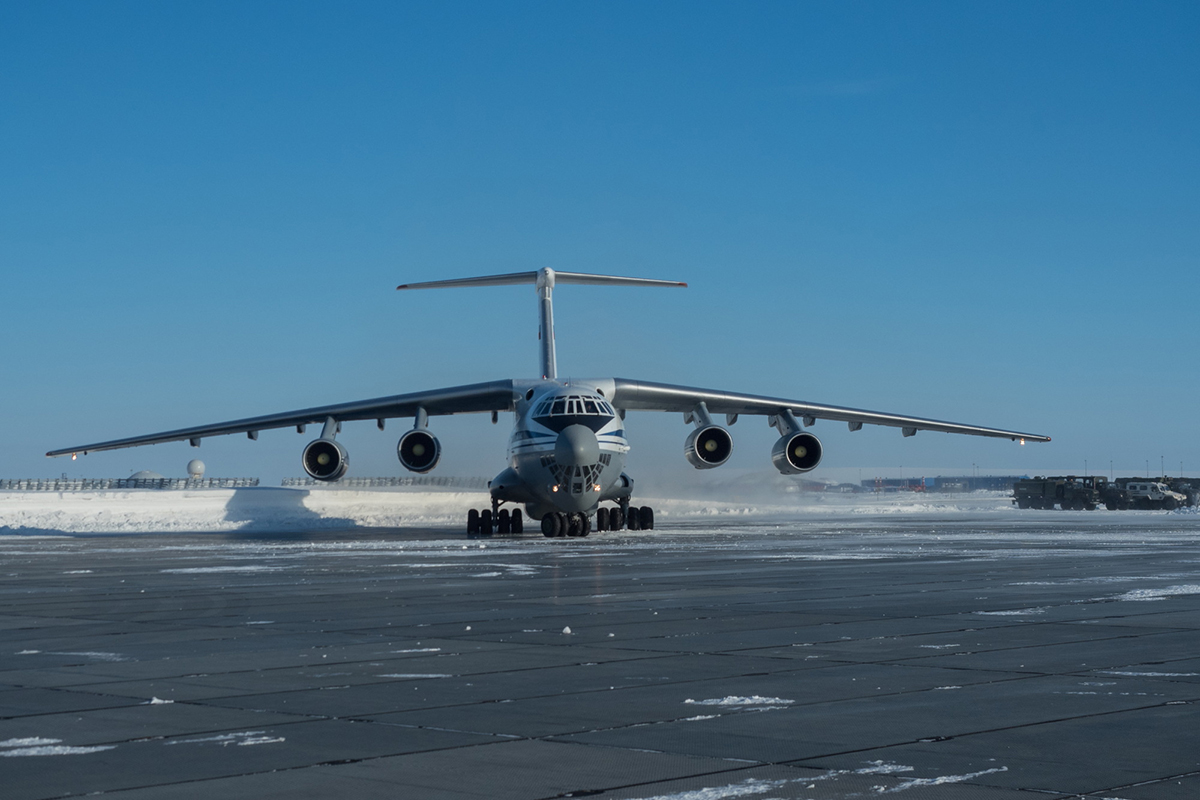
Nagurskoye airfield

Nagurskoye (Russian: Нагу́рское; also written as Nagurskaja; ICAO: UODN) is an airfield in Alexandra Land in Arkhangelsk Oblast, Russia located 1,350 kilometres (840 mi) north of Murmansk. It is an extremely remote Arctic base and Russia's northernmost military base. The base is named after Polish-Russian pilot Jan Nagórski.

Nagurskoye was built in the 1950s as a staging base for Soviet Long Range Aviation bombers to reach the US, and was maintained by the Operational Group Arctic (OGA), which maintained all Arctic bomber staging facilities. An An-72 (Coaler) cargo plane crashed there on 23 December 1996 while attempting to land, one of the northernmost plane crashes ever. The airfield is operational, maintained by Frontier Guards (FSB) and capable of servicing An-26 and An-72 aircraft. Il-76 cargo aircraft can land at each of the two unsurfaced runways and have been carrying supplies, equipment and personnel.

Satellite photographs from September 2015 show a new base without armored vehicles or air defenses. Instead, the base consists of a central structure, several supporting structures such as fuel depots and heating installations, old and new runways, as well as anchorages that allow for the delivery of construction materials and supplies.

Satellite photos by Planet Labs from 13 August 2020 show that the newer runway is being concrete surfaced and extended from 8,200 feet (2,500 m) to 11,500 feet (3,500 m). The runway expansion can support permanent deployments of combat jets to Moscow's most northerly base. Deploying interceptors, maritime strike fighters, airborne early warning and maritime patrol aircraft at Nagurskoye would give Russia a significant military edge in the Arctic; while refuelling long-range bombers there would noticeably extend their range.

== Based units ==
According to the Georgian Foundation for Strategic and International Studies, an aviation commandant's office exists at the base, belonging to the 45th Air and Air Defence Forces Army. Three other units—a tactical group from the 80th Arctic Motor Rifle Brigade, and two battalions from the Northern Fleet Joint Strategic Command—are also based on the island near to the base.

== See also ==
- List of military airbases in Russia
