= Schatzgräber (weather station) =

Former weather station established by Nazi Germany in the Arctic

Schatzgräber or “Treasure Hunter” was the name of a military weather station Nazi Germany's Kriegsmarine established in the north of Alexandra Land in the Arctic Franz Josef Land archipelago in 1943. The construction of the secret complex codename “Treasure Hunter” began in 1942 at the command of Adolf Hitler but came into operation only in 1943. The mission of the station's crew started in September that year and lasted until July 1944, when they were summarily evacuated after most of them consumed raw polar bear meat and fell sick.

== Weather observations in the Arctic ==
Since the beginning of World War II, the Kriegsmarine was endowed with the task of collecting meteorological data in support of the German war effort. That was accomplished mainly by weather-observation vessels (frequently refitted fishing boats). Motivated by repeated losses of such boats, beginning in 1941, and under direction of Hans-Robert Knoespel, the erection of meteorological stations on land was planned and executed. The first such station around the Arctic Ocean, Knospe, was established in the northwest of the main island of the Svalbard archipelago in October 1941.

== Weather troop Schatzgräber ==
To prepare members of the meteorological mission for the conditions in the deployment area, the Kriegsmarine's weather department was training candidates in a camp named Goldhöhe (Czech: Zlaté návrší) in the Giant Mountains in Silesia. As hardly any more alpine- or arctic-experienced personnel were available, inexperienced meteorologists were to prepare for arctic conditions in the alpine facility. Diverging from established practice, the mission was not named after its team leader, but after H. Schatz, who was heading training operations at Goldhöhe. Schatz would not join Schatzgräber station, as he was to command the Bassgeiger mission in northeast Greenland at that time.

=== The meteorological station on Alexandra Land ===
Early in September 1943, the weather observation boat Kehdingen sailed for Alexandra Land from Kiel, via Narvik and Tromsø. Submarine U 387 was put on escort duty for the trip. Also, the U-boat's crew helped unpack supplies and equipment in the actual establishment of the station. Starting on November 17, Schatzgräber reported weather and temperature data. With the polar night ending, Schatzgräber added measurements of high-altitude / jet stream winds, that were conducted and reported by radio balloons. Resupply was conducted by U 387 and by parachuting from a Focke-Wulf Condor aircraft.

=== Mission failing ===
On 30 May 1944, weather inspector Gerhard Wallik and Obergefreiter Werner Blankenburg hunted and killed a polar bear. Blankenburg, who was also the station's cook, prepared a serving of steak tartare from the animal, which was consumed by all but one member of the station's crew. As Blankenburg had also been the one who had consumed the greatest amount of raw polar bear meat, he was the first to report pain in his legs and a high fever after a few days. Within a month, nine more members of the weather troop fell ill, with the vegetarian paramedic Gerhard Hoffmann as the only exception. The Kriegsmarine's medical corps remotely attested trichinosis, and the evacuation of the operation was ordered immediately.

=== Removal of the Schatzgräber weather troop ===
To adequately care for the sick troop, staff surgeon Dr. Wendt of the Tromsø marine hospital was chosen. He was to fly in to the station and parachute from a Condor (registration: F8+RL), commanded by naval pilot Oberleutnant Stahnke, who had repeatedly flown parachute resupply missions for the station. The station's commander, Dr. Drees, however, gave conflicting feedback by radio, indicating that an evacuation was unnecessary. In spite of the order for immediate evacuation that was given very early in July, the mission started only on 7 July. On board the plane flown by Stahnke was Dr. Wendt, who had gone through a snap parachuting training; however, he was still looking forward to his first jump. Stahnke spared him this experience by bringing the Condor down on Alexandra Land, while damaging the landing gear. The Condor damaged, immediate evacuation was not an option and delusions of those fallen sick added to the difficulty of the situation. A BV 222 seaplane (registration: X4+BH) was sent from Biscarosse to Banak to aid in resupplying spare parts to repair the stranded aircraft. On 11 July the Condor landed with haphazardly-repaired landing gear in Trondheim, carrying all members of the Schatzgräber weather troop.

== Removal of the leftover minefield ==
To protect the weather station, a minefield had been laid out. However, it could not be removed during the evacuation procedure. When veterans learned in the 1950s that the Soviet Union had established a weather station on Alexandra Land of their own accord, they attempted to contact the Soviet leadership to submit the mines' positions, but their attempts were altogether ignored. Only in 1990, an expedition conducted by the Norwegian Polar Institute could secure and disarm the mines, building on the original maps of the Schatzgräber weather troop. Today, one of the mines removed from the site is an exhibit at Forsvarsmuseet in Oslo.

In 2016, some 500 artifacts from what appears to be the base were discovered by Russian scientists and removed for study.

== See also ==
- North Atlantic weather war
- Weather Station Kurt in Canada
