= Hayes Island =

Island in Franz Josef Land, Russia

Russian: Остров Хейса
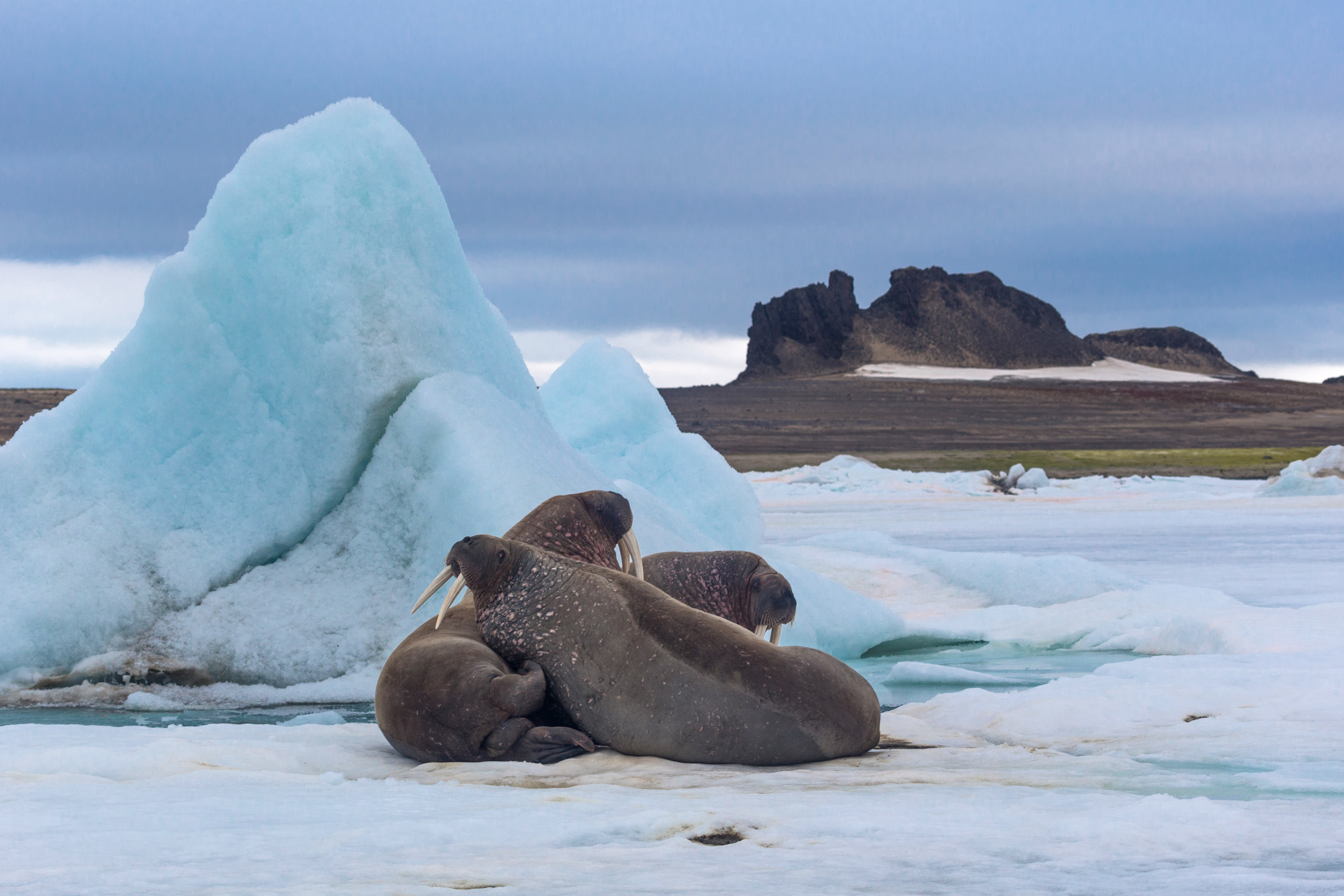
- Walruses in Hayes Island

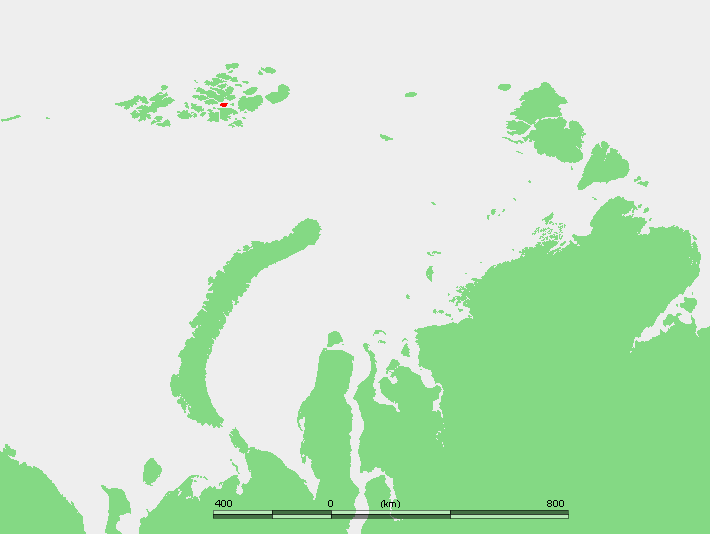
- Location of Hayes Island in the Franz Josef Archipelago

Geography
- Location: Arctic Ocean
- Coordinates: 80°27′N 58°03′E
- Archipelago: Franz Josef Land
- Area: 132 km^{2} (51 sq mi)
- Highest point: 242 metres (794 ft)

Administration
- Russia

Demographics
- Population: 0

Hayes Island, also known as Heiss Island (Russian: Остров Хейса, romanized: Ostrov Kheysa) is an island in Franz Josef Land, Russia. It is located in the central area of the archipelago, north of Hall Island, between Champ Island and Wilczek Land. Its area is 132 km^{2}.

Hayes island is almost unglacierized, having only a small ice-cap off its centre by its northern shore. Highest point 242 m.

The strait to the south of Hayes Island is known as Markham Sound (Russian: пролив Маркама), which narrows down to only 5 km at this point. On the east lies a strait known as Avstriyskiy proliv, beyond which lie the smaller Komsomol Islands. 7 km wide Proliv Yermak in the north, separates Hayes Island from the Zichy Land subgroup of the Franz Josef Archipelago.

The cape on the southwestern shore of Hayes island is called Cape Ostantsovy.

== History ==
Kheysa, a now abandoned Soviet rocket launching site, was located on this island.

Now Hayes Island is home to the Krenkel hydrometeorological station (80°37′ N, 58°03′ E).

This island (including the Komsomol Islands) was originally named after veteran Arctic explorer Isaac Hayes, who undertook a historical Polar expedition in 1850. The other island's name in English is Heiss Island, because German cartographers Germanized its name after transliterating from the Russian to the corrupted name "Heiss" (meaning "hot" in German).

== Adjacent islands ==
- 7 km to the east of Hayes Island's eastern shore lie the Komsomol Islands (Острова Комсомольские; Ostrova Komsomolskiye). They consist of a 7 km-long triangular island and two very small islets off its northern cape. This island group was named after the Soviet time Komsomols.
- There is a 1.2 km long islet located off a small bay west of Hayes Island's northeastern cape.

== Climate ==
Hayes Island is in the transition zone between a tundra climate (ET) and an ice cap climate (EF) technically falling into the former due to above freezing averages in July and August but below freezing low temperatures year round. It's a frigid and unforgiving land with nonexistent summers and winters which last year round. Hayes has a very cloudy climate, with 8 months of the year receiving little to no sunshine. Although snow is more common year round, it can rain from June through October.

Climate data for Hayes Island
Month	Jan	Feb	Mar	Apr	May	Jun	Jul	Aug	Sep	Oct	Nov	Dec	Year
Record high °C (°F)	1.9 (35.4)	0.1 (32.2)	1.6 (34.9)	0.7 (33.3)	3.3 (37.9)	8.0 (46.4)	10.3 (50.5)	10.2 (50.4)	5.6 (42.1)	3.8 (38.8)	1.6 (34.9)	1.7 (35.1)	10.3 (50.5)
Mean daily maximum °C (°F)	−16.7 (1.9)	−16.8 (1.8)	−17.2 (1.0)	−13.6 (7.5)	−6.1 (21.0)	0.2 (32.4)	2.0 (35.6)	1.6 (34.9)	−0.4 (31.3)	−6.2 (20.8)	−10.7 (12.7)	−15.0 (5.0)	−8.2 (17.2)
Daily mean °C (°F)	−20.1 (−4.2)	−20.2 (−4.4)	−20.6 (−5.1)	−16.5 (2.3)	−8.1 (17.4)	−1.2 (29.8)	0.7 (33.3)	0.4 (32.7)	−1.7 (28.9)	−8.0 (17.6)	−13.6 (7.5)	−18.2 (−0.8)	−10.6 (12.9)
Mean daily minimum °C (°F)	−23.3 (−9.9)	−23.6 (−10.5)	−23.8 (−10.8)	−19.2 (−2.6)	−10.1 (13.8)	−2.5 (27.5)	−0.2 (31.6)	−0.6 (30.9)	−3.0 (26.6)	−10.0 (14.0)	−16.4 (2.5)	−21.4 (−6.5)	−12.8 (8.9)
Record low °C (°F)	−42.1 (−43.8)	−44.4 (−47.9)	−43.5 (−46.3)	−39.6 (−39.3)	−27.7 (−17.9)	−12.3 (9.9)	−3.9 (25.0)	−8.8 (16.2)	−23.2 (−9.8)	−32.3 (−26.1)	−39.5 (−39.1)	−41.5 (−42.7)	−44.4 (−47.9)
Average precipitation mm (inches)	24.9 (0.98)	26.1 (1.03)	21.6 (0.85)	17.6 (0.69)	12.4 (0.49)	11.7 (0.46)	16.7 (0.66)	21.6 (0.85)	27.5 (1.08)	17.9 (0.70)	20.0 (0.79)	27.8 (1.09)	245.8 (9.67)
Average rainy days	0	0	0.1	0.1	0.4	3	12	12	7	1	0.1	0	36
Average snowy days	21	20	19	16	23	18	11	14	22	25	21	20	230
Average relative humidity (%)	82	82	80	81	85	88	91	92	90	86	84	83	85
Mean monthly sunshine hours	0	0	66	234	226	193	171	83	30	1	0	0	1,004
Source 1: Pogoda.ru.net
Source 2: NOAA (sun 1961–1990)
