= Ernst Krenkel Observatory =

Former Soviet rocket launch site on Heiss Island, Franz Josef Land

Coordinates: 80°27′N 58°03′E

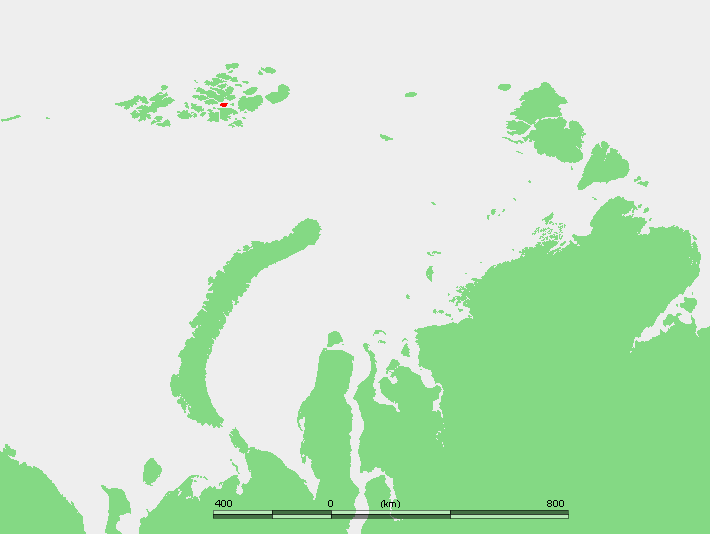
Location of Heiss Island in the Franz Josef Archipelago

Ernst Krenkel Observatory (Russian: Обсерватория имени Эрнста Кренкеля), also known as Kheysa, is a research station, a former Soviet rocket launching site and current meteorological station located on Heiss Island, Franz Josef Land. It is named after a famous Arctic explorer Ernst Krenkel, a member of the crew of the North Pole-1 drift ice station and other notable Soviet polar expeditions. It is the northernmost meteorological station in Russia.

== History ==
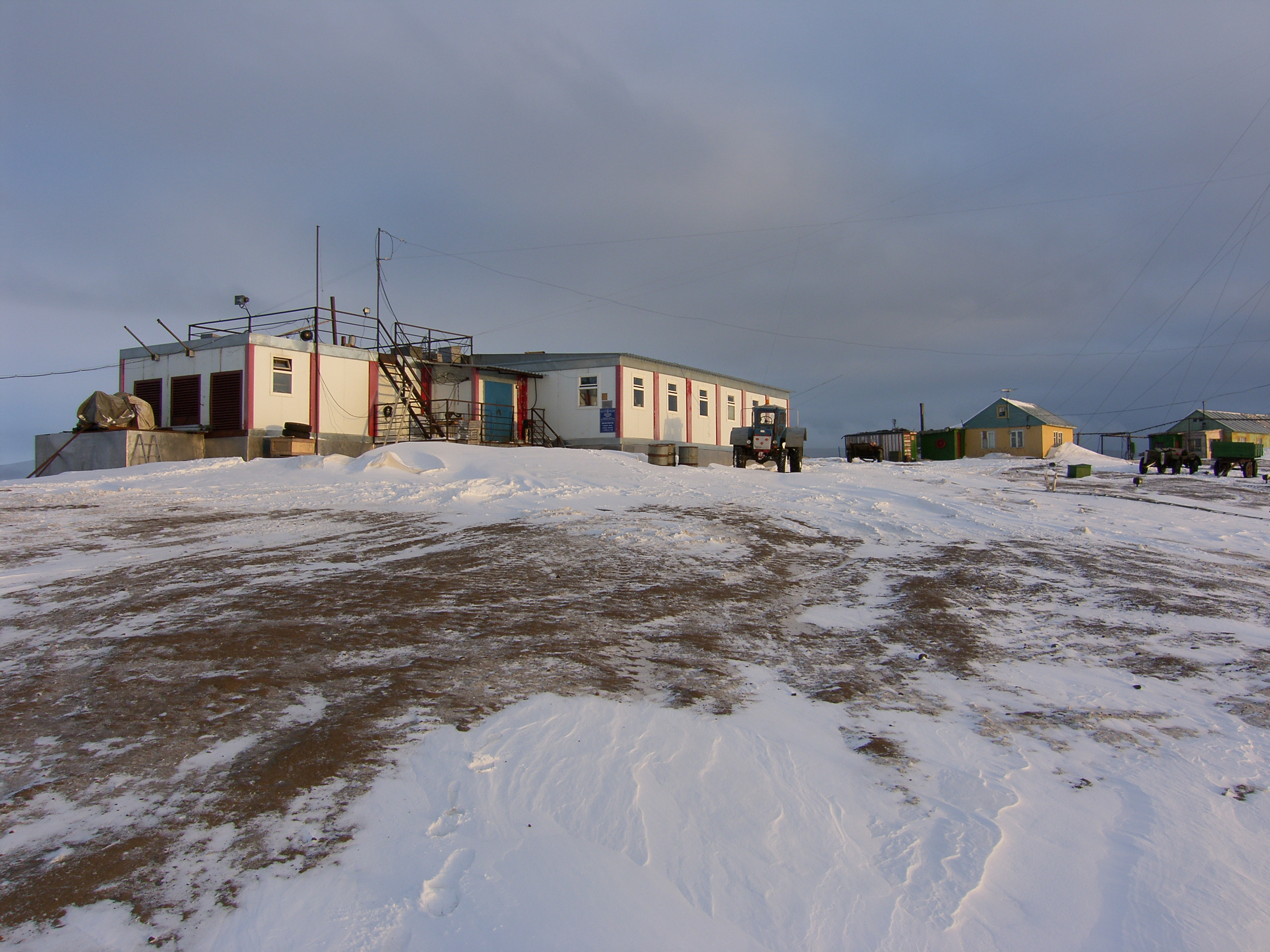
Krenkel Observatory in September 2007

The observatory was initially located in Tikhaya Bay on Hooker Island, but it was moved and re-established on Heiss Island in 1957 to take more representative measurements. The new observatory was built by the Arctic and Antarctic Research Institute, and it was originally named Druzhnaya (Russian: Дружная). That year, it began launching MR-12 rockets, and the location was also used to take geomagnetic measurements in the high Arctic. In 1958, atmospheric and ozone observations began as well.

About 40 buildings were built on the site, with the observatory being 22 metres (72 ft) above sea level. In 1972, the observatory was renamed after Krenkel.

Launches primarily ceased after 1990, though one was performed in 2007 and another two in 2008. The station was closed in 2001 due to a fire, and in 2004, a new meteorological station was built. In 2018, renovations on the abandoned buildings began so that the Russian Arctic National Park service could station people there. Another research station moved into the existing buildings around 2021. In 2024, a new satellite communication system was installed at the site.

== Climate ==
Climate data for Ernst Krenkel Observatory, Heiss Island
Month	Jan	Feb	Mar	Apr	May	Jun	Jul	Aug	Sep	Oct	Nov	Dec	Year
Record high °C (°F)	1.9 (35.4)	0.1 (32.2)	1.6 (34.9)	0.7 (33.3)	3.3 (37.9)	8.0 (46.4)	10.3 (50.5)	10.2 (50.4)	5.6 (42.1)	3.8 (38.8)	1.6 (34.9)	1.7 (35.1)	10.3 (50.5)
Mean daily maximum °C (°F)	−16.7 (1.9)	−16.8 (1.8)	−17.2 (1.0)	−13.6 (7.5)	−6.1 (21.0)	0.2 (32.4)	2.0 (35.6)	1.6 (34.9)	−0.4 (31.3)	−6.2 (20.8)	−10.7 (12.7)	−15.0 (5.0)	−8.2 (17.2)
Daily mean °C (°F)	−20.1 (−4.2)	−20.2 (−4.4)	−20.6 (−5.1)	−16.5 (2.3)	−8.1 (17.4)	−1.2 (29.8)	0.7 (33.3)	0.4 (32.7)	−1.7 (28.9)	−8.0 (17.6)	−13.6 (7.5)	−18.2 (−0.8)	−10.6 (12.9)
Mean daily minimum °C (°F)	−23.3 (−9.9)	−23.6 (−10.5)	−23.8 (−10.8)	−19.2 (−2.6)	−10.1 (13.8)	−2.5 (27.5)	−0.2 (31.6)	−0.6 (30.9)	−3.0 (26.6)	−10.0 (14.0)	−16.4 (2.5)	−21.4 (−6.5)	−12.8 (8.9)
Record low °C (°F)	−42.1 (−43.8)	−44.4 (−47.9)	−43.5 (−46.3)	−39.6 (−39.3)	−27.7 (−17.9)	−12.3 (9.9)	−3.9 (25.0)	−8.8 (16.2)	−23.2 (−9.8)	−32.3 (−26.1)	−39.5 (−39.1)	−41.5 (−42.7)	−44.4 (−47.9)
Average precipitation mm (inches)	24.9 (0.98)	26.1 (1.03)	21.6 (0.85)	17.6 (0.69)	12.4 (0.49)	11.7 (0.46)	16.7 (0.66)	21.6 (0.85)	27.5 (1.08)	17.9 (0.70)	20.0 (0.79)	27.8 (1.09)	245.8 (9.67)
Average rainy days	0	0	0.1	0.1	0.4	3	12	12	7	1	0.1	0	36
Average snowy days	21	20	19	16	23	18	11	14	22	25	21	20	230
Average relative humidity (%)	82	82	80	81	85	88	91	92	90	86	84	83	85
Source: pogodaiklimat.ru
