= Alexandra Land =

Island in Franz Josef Land, Russia

Земля Александры (Russian)
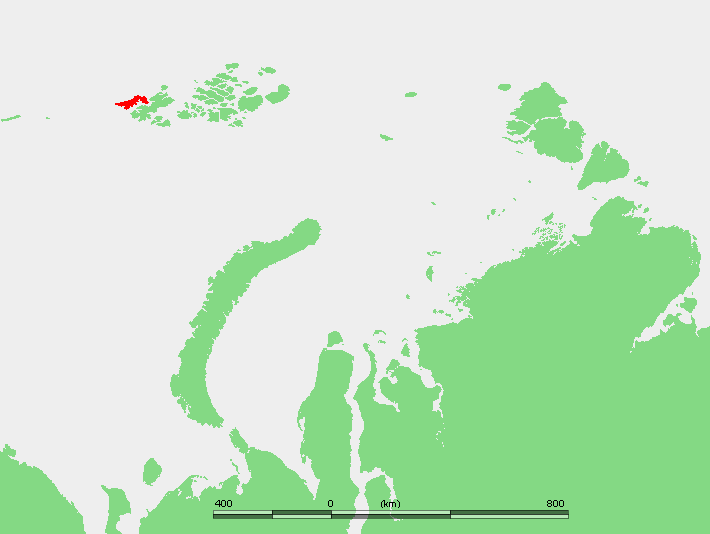
- Location of Alexandra Land in the Franz Josef Archipelago

- Location within Russia

Geography
- Location: Arctic
- Coordinates: 80.6339°N 46.5839°E
- Archipelago: Franz Josef Land
- Area: 1,050 km^{2} (410 sq mi)
- Length: 70 km (43 mi)
- Width: 30 km (19 mi)
- Highest elevation: 382 m (1253 ft)
- Highest point: Kupol Lunny

Administration
- Russia

Demographics
- Population: 5 (2007)

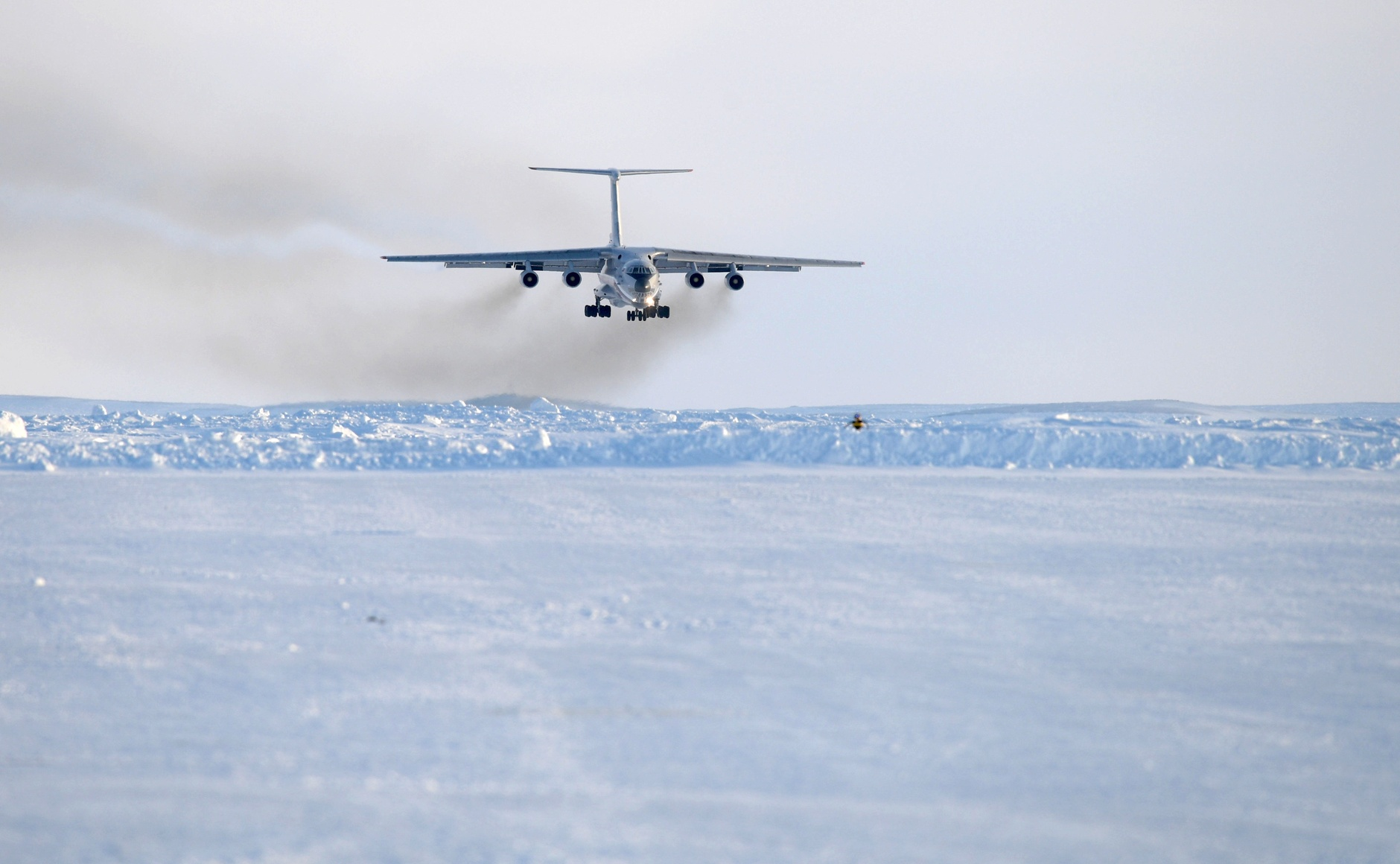
An Ilyushin Il-76 landing at Alexandra Land.

Alexandra Land (Russian: Земля Александры, romanized: Zemlya Aleksandry) is a large island located in Franz Josef Land, Arkhangelsk Oblast, Russia. Not counting detached and far-lying Victoria Island, it is the westernmost island of Franz Josef Land. It is the site of a Russian military base that was reopened in 2017.

== Geography ==
The highest point of the island, 382 m (1,253 ft), is the summit of Kupol Lunny (Купол Лунный) "Dome of the Moon", a large ice dome covering most of the western part of the island. At the western end of the western glaciated area lies the Nordenskiöld Glacier; other glaciers in the island are the Worcester Glacier (HMS Worcester Glacier) and the Payer Glacier. The northern part of the island is unglacierized and its eastern end forms a peninsula stretching southwards, the Polyarnykh Letchikov Peninsula. This peninsula is covered by Kupol Kropotkina (Купол Кропоткина), a smaller ice dome. There are three large lakes on the island, including the Utinoye Lake (Duck Lake) and the Ledyanoye Lake (Ice Lake).

Dezhnev Bay (Zaliv Dezhneva) lies between the western part of the island and the Polyarnykh Letchikov Peninsula. Cape Thomas (Mys Tomasa) is the southernmost headland of the peninsula. Cambridge Channel (Proliv Kambritch) is a wide sound between Alexandra Land and Zemlya Georga.

At the southern end this island has two capes pointing southwestwards in its southernmost coast: Cape Lofley and Cape Ludlow. Cape Mary Harmsworth, the cape pointing westwards is the westernmost point of the Franz Josef Archipelago proper.

== History ==
The English explorer Benjamin Leigh Smith, sighted Alexandra Land in 1880, but did not land. He named the area for Alexandra, then Princess of Wales. An alternative account states that the name "Alexandra Land" commemorates Grand Duchess Alexandra Pavlovna of Russia (1783–1801), who became Archduchess of Austria in 1799 upon her marriage to Archduke Joseph of Austria, Palatine of Hungary (1776-1847).

The Jackson–Harmsworth expedition led by Frederick Jackson was the first to set foot on Alexandra Land in 1895. Cape Mary Harmsworth was named after main sponsor Alfred Harmsworth's wife Mary. In 1897, Jackson established that the land discovered by Leigh Smith was in fact composed of two separate islands. He named the southeastern island Prince George Land.

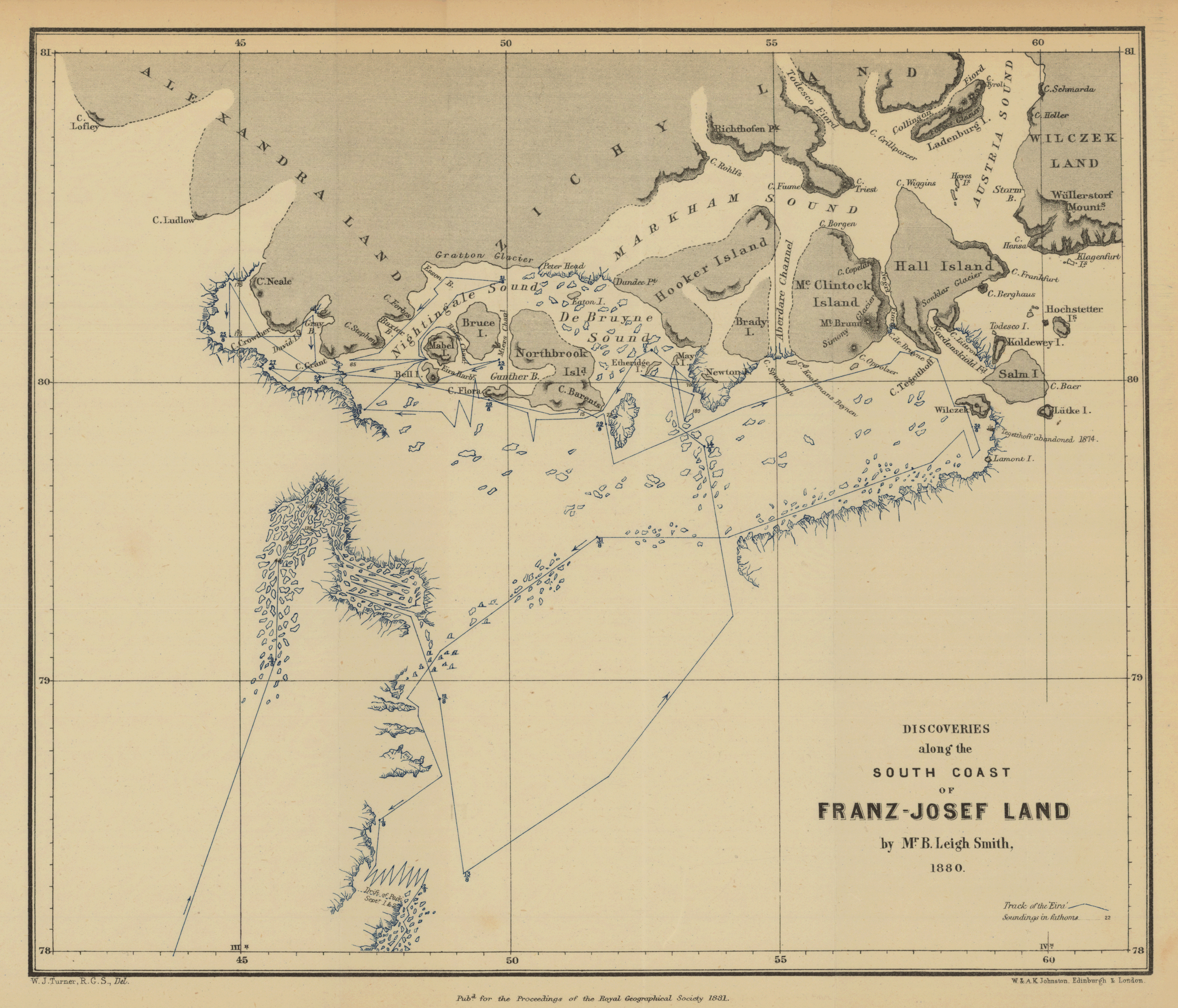
First map to show Alexandra Land, from the 1880 expedition by Benjamin Leigh Smith

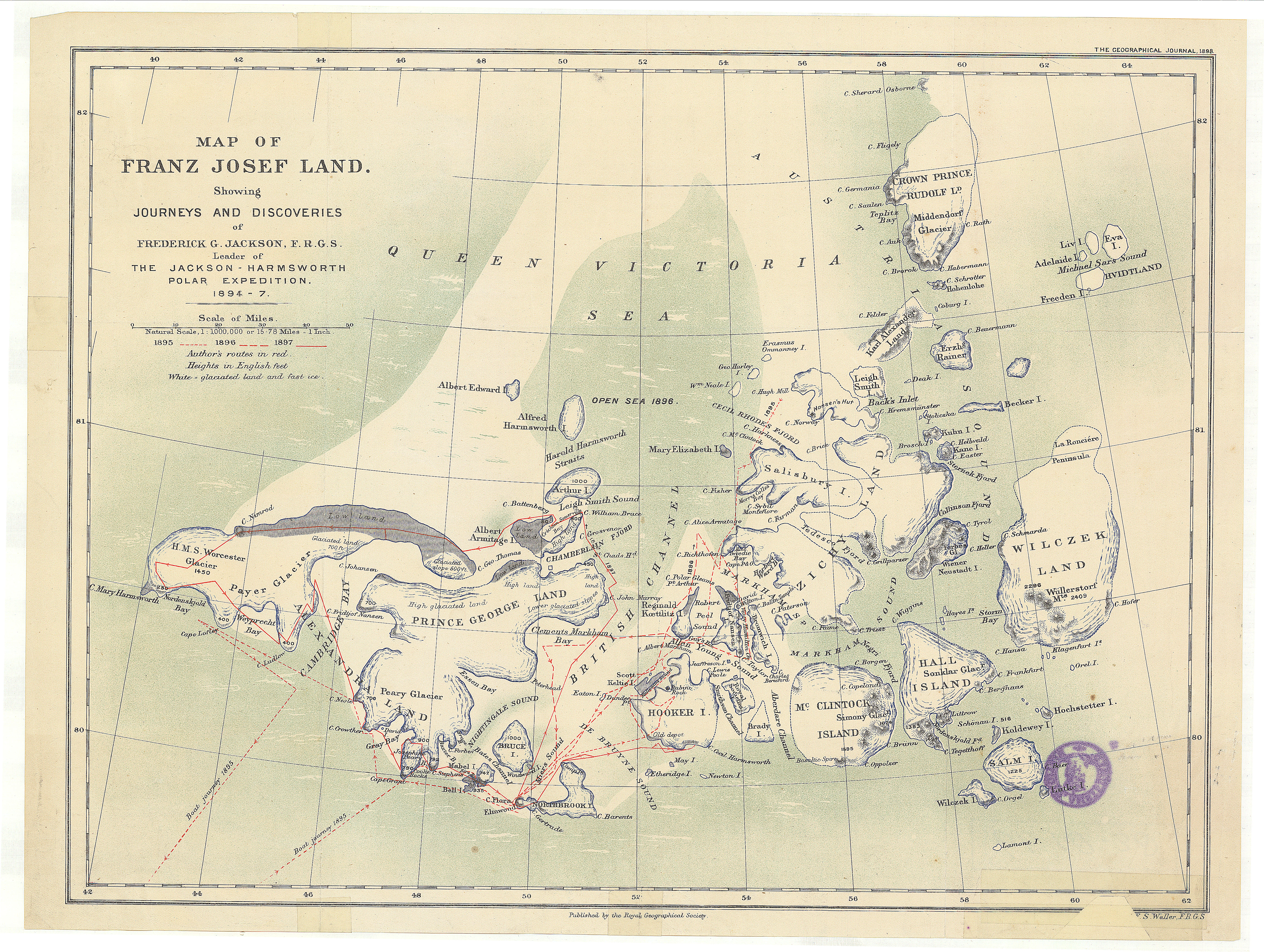
Alexandra Land in an 1898 map of Franz Josef Land showing the explorations of Frederick Jackson

Russian navigator Valerian Albanov of the Svyataya Anna reached Cape Mary Harmsworth in Alexandra Land in 1914 after his ordeal on the polar ice.

During World War II, the Germans established an ill-fated meteorological station on the island, called Schatzgräber ("Treasure Hunter"). Most of the members were stricken with trichinosis after eating raw polar bear meat. The survivors were removed and the project abandoned.

During the Cold War it was the site of the 31st Independent Radio-Technical Company (Military Unit Number 03184 ()), part of the 10th Independent Air Defence Army of the Soviet Air Defence Forces.

=== Nagurskoye ===
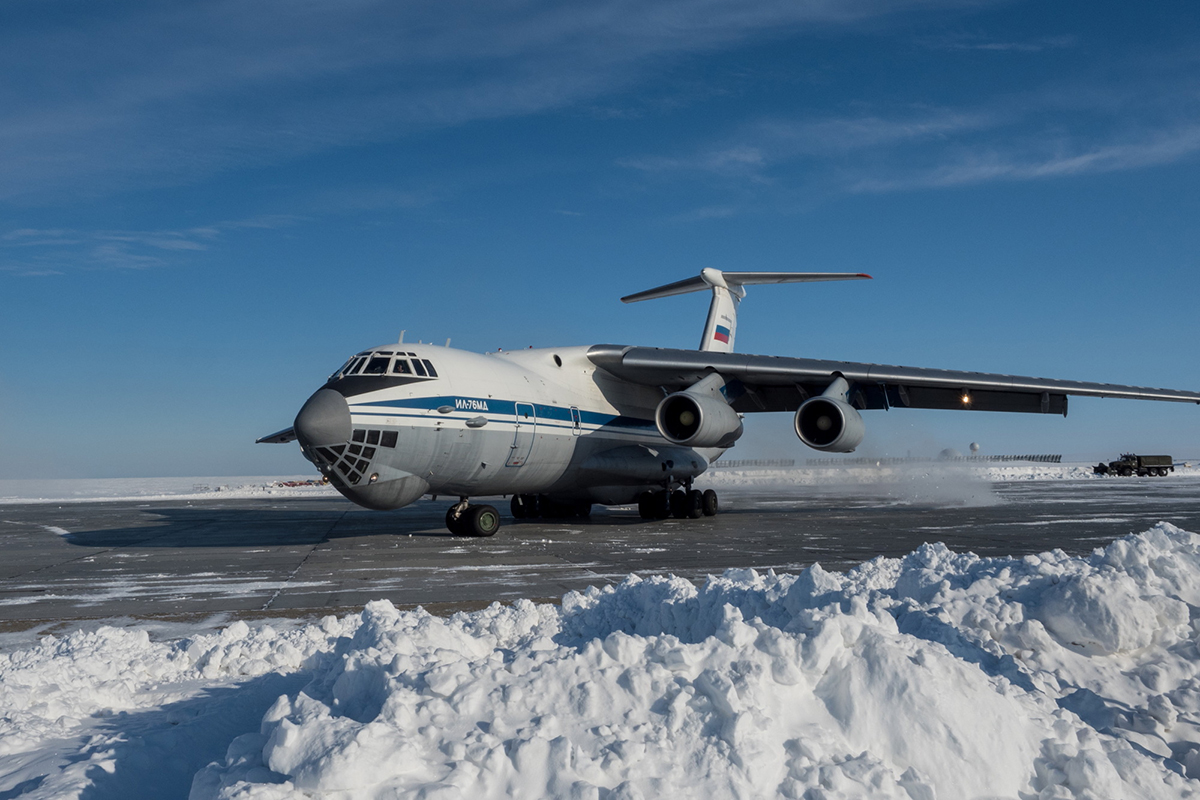
Nagurskoye airfield

Alexandra Land is home to Nagurskoye military base, Russia's northernmost military base, built in the 1950s.

Nagurskoye is a Russian base located on the island at 80°49′N 47°25′E, on the site of the former meteorological station. It was named after pioneer pilot Jan Nagórski (1888–1976) and served as one of the most important meteorological stations in the archipelago during the Cold War. This base has a 1,500 m (4,900 ft) snow runway. An Antonov An-72 cargo aircraft crashed while landing at Nagurskoye on 23 December 1996.

A major new base, named the "Arctic Trefoil" (Arkticheskiy trilistnik) for its three-lobed structure, was constructed at Nagurskoye. It can house 150 soldiers for 18 months and has an area of 14,000 square metres (150,000 sq ft).

== Ecology ==
The polar bear, Ursus maritimus, is found on Alexandra Land. The polar bear population in this region, as in other Arctic subregions, is genetically distinct from other polar bear subpopulations in differing Arctic subregions.

== See also ==
- List of islands of Russia
- List of glaciers of Russia
- Queen Victoria Sea
