= Franz Josef Land =

Archipelago in the Arctic

Земля Франца-Иосифа (Russian)
- Map of Franz Josef Land

- Location of Franz Josef Land

Geography
- Location: Arctic Ocean
- Coordinates: 81°N 55°E
- Total islands: 192
- Area: 16,134 km^{2} (6,229 sq mi)
- Highest elevation: 620 m (2030 ft)
- Highest point: Wiener Neustadt Island

Administration
- Russia
- Federal subject: Arkhangelsk Oblast

Demographics
- Population: Only temporarily occupied (e.g. by research or military stations)

Franz Josef Land (Note: Name variants: Frantz Iosef Land, Franz Joseph Land or Francis Joseph's Land; Norwegian: Frans Josefs land) (Russian: Земля́ Фра́нца-Ио́сифа, romanized: Zemlya Frantsa-Iosifa) is a Russian archipelago in the Arctic Ocean. It is inhabited only by military personnel, and has never had a permanent population. It constitutes the northernmost part of Arkhangelsk Oblast and consists of 192 islands, which cover an area of 16,134 square kilometers (6,229 sq mi), stretching 375 kilometers (233 mi) from east to west and 234 kilometers (145 mi) from north to south. The islands are categorized in three groups (western, central, and eastern) separated by the British Channel and the Austrian Strait. The central group is further divided into a northern and southern section by the Markham Sound. The largest island is Prince George Land, which measures 2,741 square kilometers (1,058 sq mi), followed by Wilczek Land, Graham Bell Island and Alexandra Land.

Approximately 85% of the archipelago is glaciated, with large unglaciated areas on the largest islands and many of the smallest ones. The islands have a combined coastline of 4,425 kilometers (2,750 mi). Compared to other Arctic archipelagos, Franz Josef Land is highly dissected, as a result of it being heavily glaciated, with a very low ratio of total area to coastline of only approximately 3.6 square kilometers per coastline kilometer. Cape Fligely on Rudolf Island is the northernmost point of the Eastern Hemisphere. The highest elevations are found in the central and eastern group, with the highest point located on Wiener Neustadt Island, 620 meters (2,030 ft) above mean sea level.

The archipelago was first spotted by the Norwegian sailors Nils Fredrik Rønnbeck and Johan Petter Aidijärvi in 1865, although they did not report their finding. The first reported finding was in the 1873 Austro-Hungarian North Pole expedition led by Julius von Payer and Karl Weyprecht, who named the area after Emperor Franz Joseph I.

In 1926, the Soviet Union annexed the islands, which were known at the time as Fridtjof Nansen Land, and settled small outposts for research and military purposes. The Kingdom of Norway rejected the claim and several private expeditions were sent to the islands. With the Cold War, the islands became off limits for foreigners and two military airfields were built. The islands have been a nature sanctuary since 1994 and became part of the Russian Arctic National Park in 2012.

== History ==
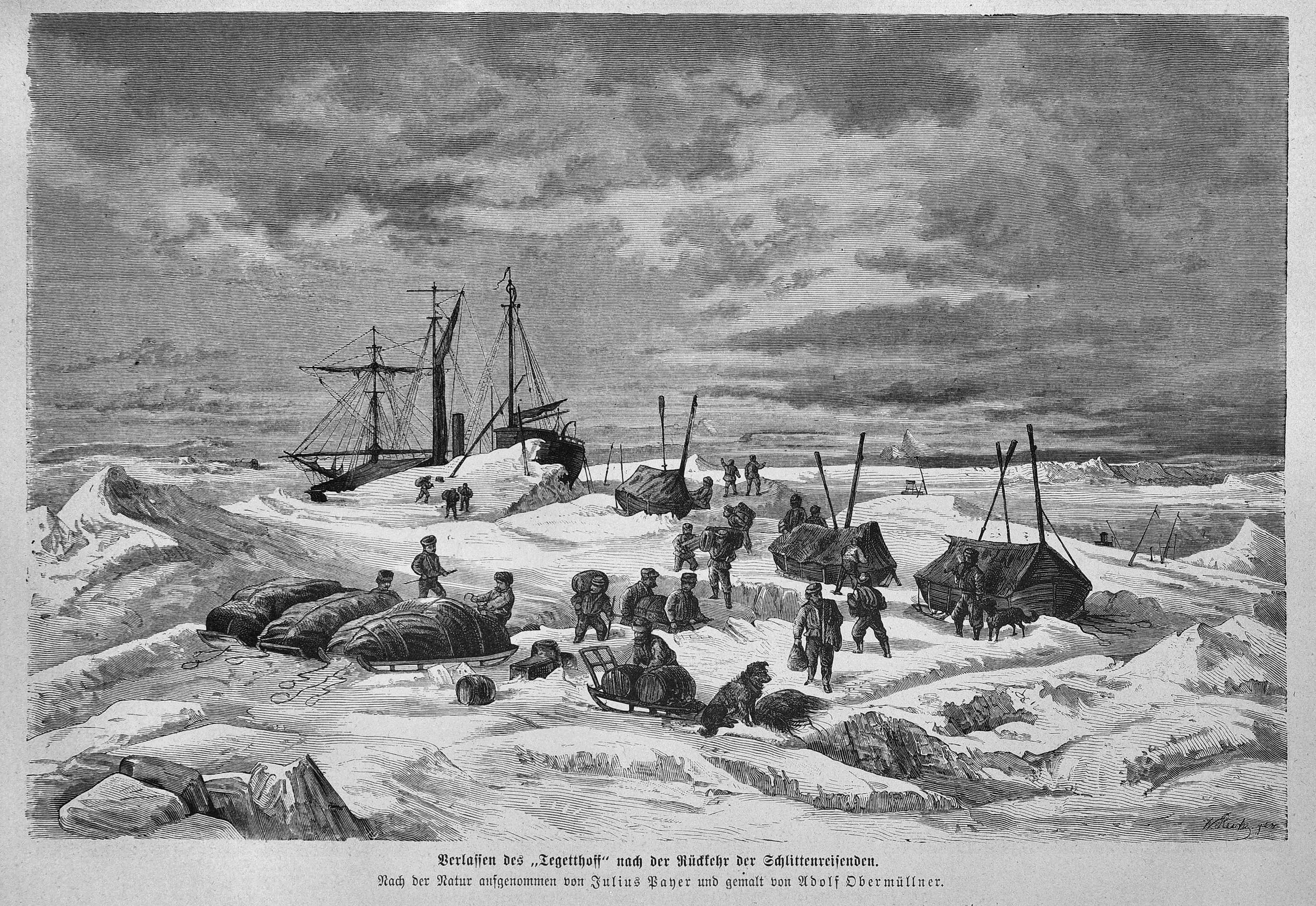
Austro-Hungarian North Pole Expedition

There are two candidates for the discovery of Franz Josef Land. The first was the Norwegian sealing vessel Spidsbergen, with captain Nils Fredrik Rønnbeck and harpooner Johan Petter Aidijärvi. They sailed northeast from Svalbard in 1865 searching for suitable sealing sites, and they found land that was most likely Franz Josef Land. The account is believed to be factual, but an announcement of the discovery was never made, and their sighting therefore remained unknown to subsequent explorers. It was at the time common to keep newly discovered areas secret, as their discovery was aimed at exploiting them for sealing and whaling, and exposure would cause competitors to flock to the site. Russian scientist N. G. Schilling proposed in 1865 that the ice conditions in the Barents Sea could only be explained if there was another land mass in the area, but he never received funding for an expedition.

The Austro-Hungarian North Pole Expedition of 1872–1874 was the first to announce the discovery of the islands. Led by Julius von Payer and Karl Weyprecht of Austria-Hungary on board the schooner Tegetthoff, the expedition's primary goal was to find the Northeast Passage and its secondary goal to reach the North Pole. Starting in July 1872, the vessel drifted from Novaya Zemlya to a new landmass, which they named in honor of Franz Joseph I (1830–1916), Emperor of Austria. The expedition contributed significantly to the mapping and exploration of the islands. The next expedition to spot the archipelago was the Dutch Expedition for the Exploration of the Barents Sea, on board the schooner Willem Barents. Constrained by the ice, they never reached land.

=== Polar exploration ===
Benjamin Leigh Smith's expedition in 1880, aboard the barque Eira, followed a route from Spitsbergen to Franz Josef Land, landing on Bell Island in August. Leigh Smith explored the vicinity and set up a base at Eira Harbour, before exploring towards McClintock Island. He returned the following year in the same vessel, landing at Grey Bay on George Land. The explorers were stopped by ice at Cape Flora, and Eira sank on 21 August. They built a cottage and stayed the winter, to be rescued by the British vessels Kara and Hope the following summer. These early expeditions concentrated their explorations on the southern and central parts of the archipelago.

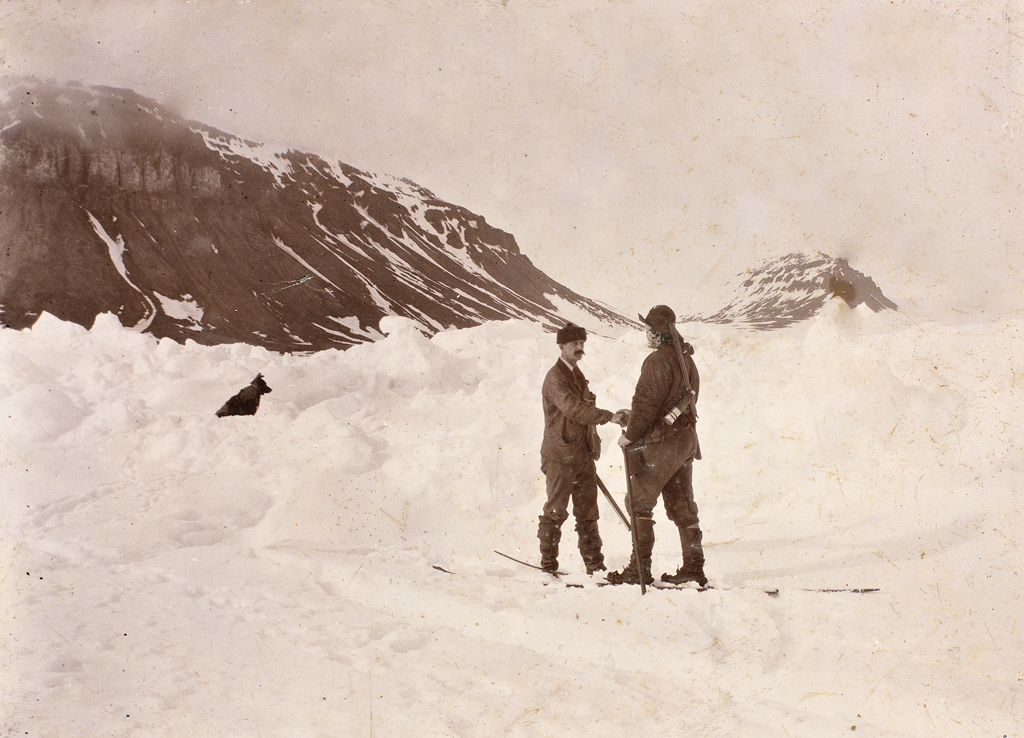
The Nansen–Jackson meeting at Cape Flora, 17 June 1896 (a posed photograph taken hours after the initial meeting)

Nansen's Fram expedition of 1893–1896 was an attempt by the Norwegian explorer Fridtjof Nansen to reach the geographical North Pole by harnessing the natural east–west current of the Arctic Ocean. Departing in 1893, Fram drifted from the New Siberian Islands for one and a half years before Nansen became impatient and set out to reach the North Pole on skis with Hjalmar Johansen. Eventually, they gave up on reaching the pole and instead found their way to Franz Josef Land, the nearest land known to man. They were thus able to establish that there was no large landmass north of this archipelago.

In the meantime the Jackson–Harmsworth Expedition set off in 1894, set up a base on Bell Island, and stayed for the winter. The following season they spent exploring. By pure chance, at Cape Flora in the spring of 1896, Nansen stumbled upon Frederick George Jackson, who was able to transport him back to Norway. Nansen and Jackson explored the northern, eastern, and western portions of the islands.

Once the basic geography of Franz Josef Land had become apparent, expeditions shifted to using the archipelago as a basis to reach the North Pole. The first such attempt was conducted by the National Geographic Society-sponsored American journalist Walter Wellman in 1898. (Note: Barr) The two Norwegians, Paul Bjørvig and Bernt Bentsen, stayed the winter 1898–99 at Cape Heller on Wilczek Land, but insufficient fuel caused the latter to die. Wellman returned the following year, but the polar expedition itself was quickly abandoned when they lost most of their equipment.

Italian nobleman Luigi Amedeo organized the next expedition in 1899, on the Stella Polare (the former whaling ship Jason renamed). They stayed the winter, and in February and again in March 1900 set out towards the pole, but failed to get far.

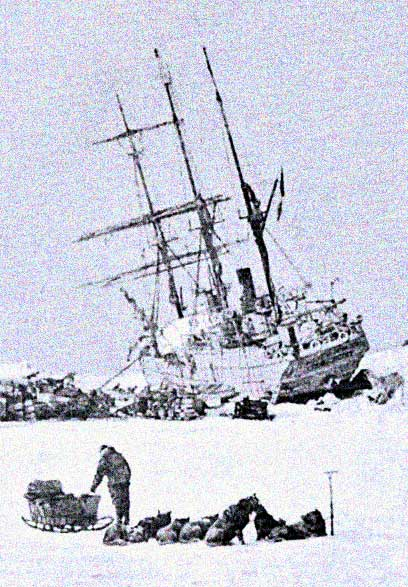
The Stella Polare was trapped and threatened to sink. The crew were obliged to land with the utmost haste and to secure materials for building a dwelling.

Evelyn Baldwin, sponsored by William Ziegler, organized the Ziegler Polar Expedition of 1901. Setting up a base on Alger Island, he stayed the winter exploring the area, but failed to press northwards. The expedition was largely regarded as an utter failure by the exploration and scientific community, which cited the lack of proper management. Unhappy with the outcome, Ziegler organized a new expedition, for which he appointed Anthony Fiala, second-in-command in the first expedition, as leader. It arrived in 1903 and spent the winter. Their ship, America, was crushed beyond repair in December and disappeared in January. Still, they made two attempts towards the pole, both of which were quickly abandoned. They were forced to stay another year, making yet another unsuccessful attempt at the pole, before being evacuated in 1905 by the Terra Nova.

The first Russian expedition was carried out in 1901, when the icebreaker Yermak traveled to the islands. The next expedition, led by hydrologist Georgy Sedov, embarked in 1912 but did not reach the archipelago until the following year because of ice. Among its scientific contributions were the first snow measurements of the archipelago, and the determination that changes of the magnetic field occur in cycles of fifteen years. It also conducted topographical surveys of the surrounding area. Scurvy set in during the second winter, killing a machinist. Despite lacking prior experience or sufficient provisions, Sedov insisted on pressing forward with a march to the pole. His condition deteriorated and he died on 6 March.

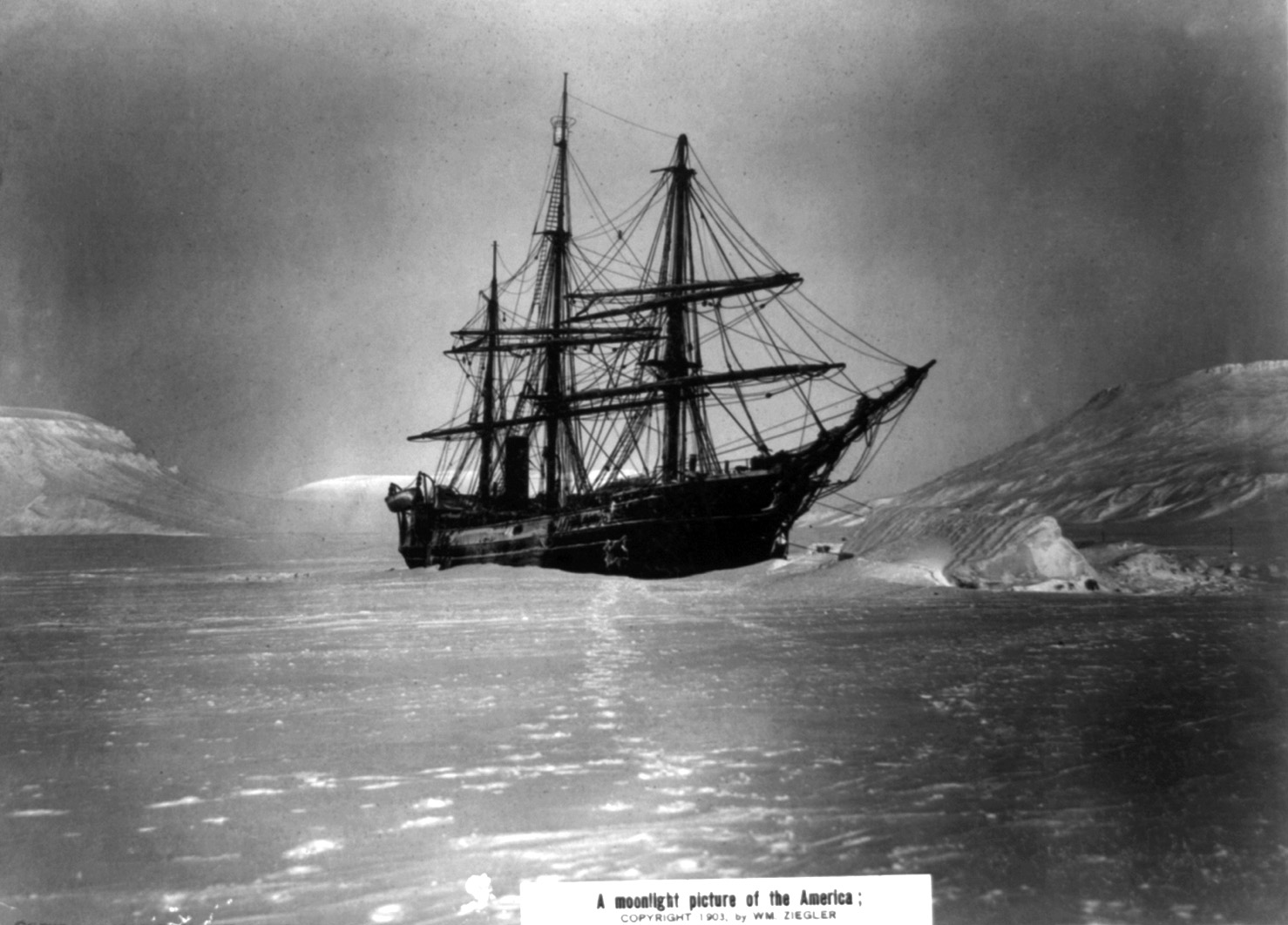
America anchored at Teplitz Bay

Hertha was sent to explore the area, and its captain, I. I. Islyamov, hoisted a Russian iron flag at Cape Flora and proclaimed Russian sovereignty over the archipelago. The act was motivated by the ongoing First World War and Russian fears of the Central Powers establishing themselves there. The world's first Arctic flight took place in August 1914, when Polish aviator (one of the first pilots of the Russian Navy) Jan Nagórski overflew Franz Josef Land in search of Sedov's group. Andromeda set out for the same purpose; while failing to locate them, the crew were able to finally determine the non-existence of Peterman Land and King Oscar Land, suspected lands north of the islands.

=== The Soviet Union ===
Soviet expeditions were sent almost yearly from 1923. Franz Josef Land had been considered terra nullius – land belonging to no one – but on 15 April 1926 the Soviet Union declared its annexation of the archipelago. Emulating Canada's declaration of the sector principle, they pronounced all land between the Soviet mainland and the North Pole to be Soviet territory. This principle has never been internationally recognized. Both Italy and Norway protested. Norway was first and foremost concerned about its economic interests in the area, in a period when Norwegian hunters and whalers were also being barred from the White Sea, Novaya Zemlya and Greenland; the Soviet government, however, largely remained passive, and did not evict Norwegian hunting ships during the following years. Nor did the Soviets interfere when, in 1928, several foreign ships entered the waters in search of the vanished airship Italia.

Norway attempted both a diplomatic solution and an expedition, financed by Lars Christensen, to establish a weather station to gain economic control over the islands, but both failed in 1929. Instead the Soviet icebreaker Sedov set out, led by Otto Schmidt, landed in Tikhaya Bay, and began construction of a permanent base. The Soviet government proposed renaming the archipelago Fridtjof Nansen Land in 1930, but the name never came into use. In 1930 the Norwegian Bratvaag Expedition visited the archipelago, but was asked by Soviet authorities to respect Soviet territorial water in the future. Other expeditions that year were the Norwegian-Swedish balloon expedition led by Hans Wilhelmsson Ahlmann on Quest and the German airship Graf Zeppelin. Except for a German weather station emplaced during the Second World War, these were the last Western expeditions to Franz Josef Land until 1990.

Soviet activities grew rapidly following the International Polar Year in 1932. The archipelago was circumnavigated, people landed on Victoria Island, and a topographical map was completed. In 1934–35 geological and glaciological expeditions were carried out, cartographic flights were flown, and up to sixty people stayed the winters between 1934 and 1936, which also saw the first birth. The first drifting ice station was set up out of Rudolf Island in 1936. An airstrip was then constructed on a glacier on the island, and by 1937 the winter population hit 300.

Activity dwindled during the Second World War and only a small group of men were kept at Rudolf Island, remaining unsupplied throughout the war. They never discovered Nazi Germany's establishment of a weather station, named Schatzgräber, on Alexandra Land as part of the North Atlantic weather war. The German station was evacuated in 1944 after the men were struck by trichinosis from eating polar bear meat. Apparent physical evidence of the base was discovered in 2016.

The Cold War produced renewed Soviet interest in the islands because of their strategic military significance. The islands were regarded as an "unsinkable aircraft carrier". The site of the former German weather station was selected as the location of a Soviet aerodrome and military base, Nagurskoye. With the advent of intercontinental ballistic missiles, the Soviet Union changed its military strategy in 1956, abolishing the strategic need for an airbase on the archipelago. The International Geophysical Year of 1957 and 1958 gave a new rise to the scientific interest in the archipelago and an airstrip was built on Heiss Island in 1956. The following year the geophysical Ernst Krenkel Observatory was established there. Activity at Tikhaya Bay was closed in 1959.

Because of the islands' military significance, the Soviet Union closed off the area to foreign researchers, although Soviet researchers carried out various expeditions, including in geophysics, studies of the ionosphere, marine biology, botany, ornithology, and glaciology. The Soviet Union opened up the archipelago for international activities from 1990, with foreigners having fairly straightforward access.

=== Recent history ===
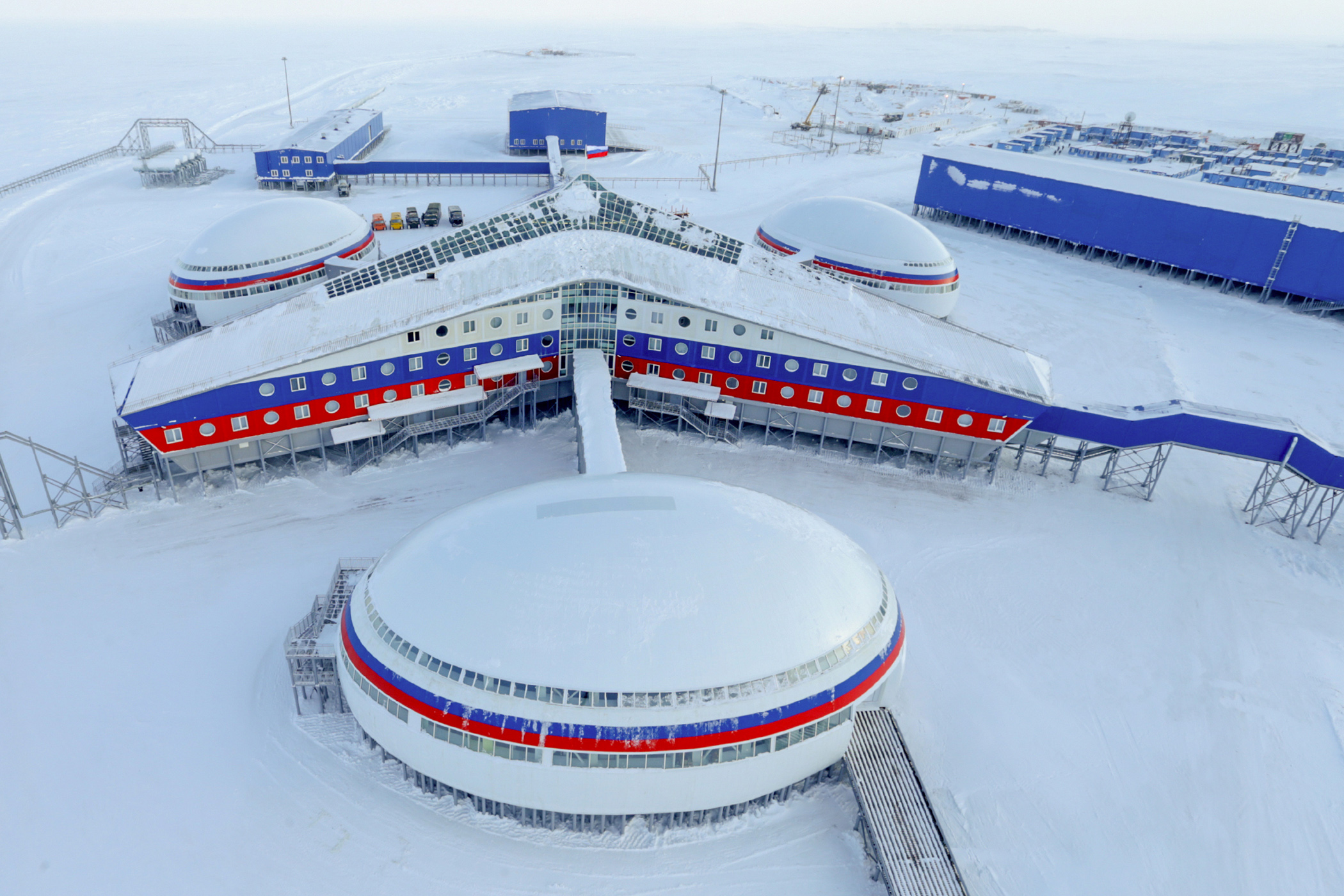
Nagurskoye is Russia's northernmost military base.

As part of the opening up of Franz Josef Land, the Institute of Geography in Moscow, Stockholm University and Umeå University (Sweden) conducted expeditions to Alexandra Land in August 1990 and August 1991, studying climate- and glacial history by radiocarbon dating raised beaches and antlers from extinct caribou. The work was conducted from a small research base southwest of Nagurskoye, built in 1989. Also in 1990, a collaboration between the Academy of Sciences, the Norwegian Polar Institute and the Polish Academy of Sciences resulted in the first of several archaeological expeditions organized by the Institute of Culture in Moscow. The military base on Graham Bell Island was abandoned in the early 1990s. The military presence at Nagurskoye was reduced to that of a border post, and the number of people stationed at Krenkel Observatory was reduced from 70 to 12. The archipelago and the surrounding waters were declared a nature reserve in April 1994. The opening of the archipelago also saw the introduction of tourism, most of which takes place on Russian-operated icebreakers. In 2011, in a move to better accommodate tourism in the archipelago, the Russian Arctic National Park was expanded to include Franz Josef Land. However, in August 2019, Russia abruptly withdrew its approval for a Norwegian cruise ship to visit the islands.

In 2012, the Russian Air Force decided to reopen the Graham Bell Airfield as part of a series of reopenings of air bases in the Arctic. A major new base, named the Arctic Trefoil for its three lobed structure, was constructed at Nagurskoye. It can maintain 150 soldiers for 18 months and has an area of 14,000 square meters, according to reporting by Radio Free Europe. The upgraded airbase is considered a threat to the U.S. military installation at Thule, Greenland.

In 2017, Russian president Vladimir Putin visited the archipelago.

In August 2019, a geographic expedition by the Russian Northern Fleet to Franz Josef Land and Novaya Zemlya discovered a new island in the archipelago, previously thought to be a peninsula of Hall Island.

== Geography ==
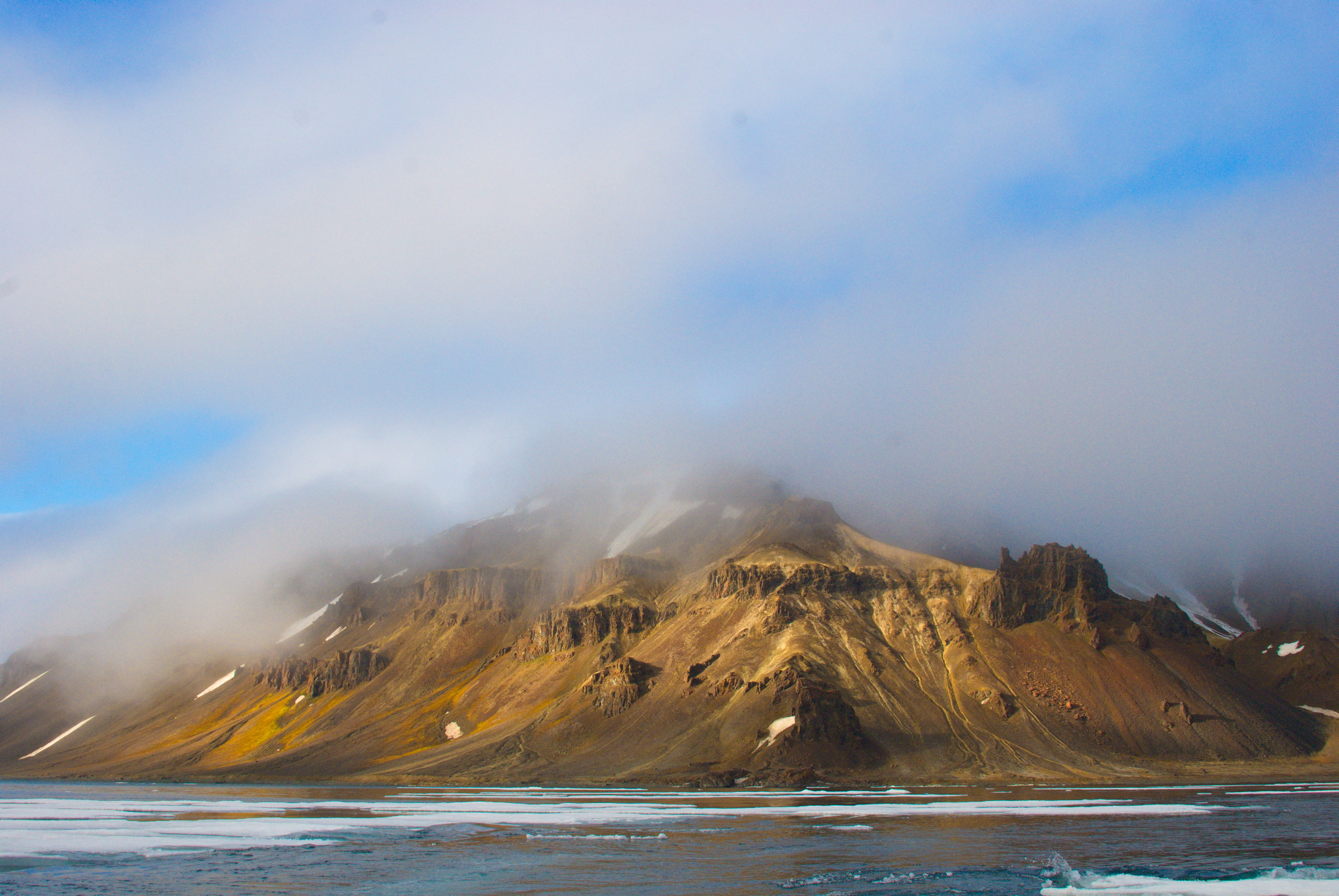
Cape Brice, Ziegler Island, Franz Josef Land.

The archipelago constitutes the northernmost part of Russia's Arkhangelsk Oblast, located between 79°46′ and 81°52′ north and 44°52′ and 62°25′ east. It is situated 360 kilometers (220 mi) north of Novaya Zemlya and 260 kilometers (160 mi) east of the Norwegian archipelago of Svalbard. Located within the Arctic Ocean, Franz Josef Land constitutes the northeastern border of the Barents Sea and the northwestern border of the Kara Sea. The islands are 900 kilometers (560 mi) from the North Pole and 750 kilometers (470 mi) from the Yamal Peninsula, the closest point of the Eurasian mainland. The archipelago falls within varying definitions of the Asia–Europe border, and is therefore variously defined as part of Asia or of Europe. Cape Flighely, situated at 81°50′ north, is the northernmost point in Eurasia and the Eastern Hemisphere, and of either Europe or Asia, depending on the continental definition. It is the third-closest landmass to the North Pole.

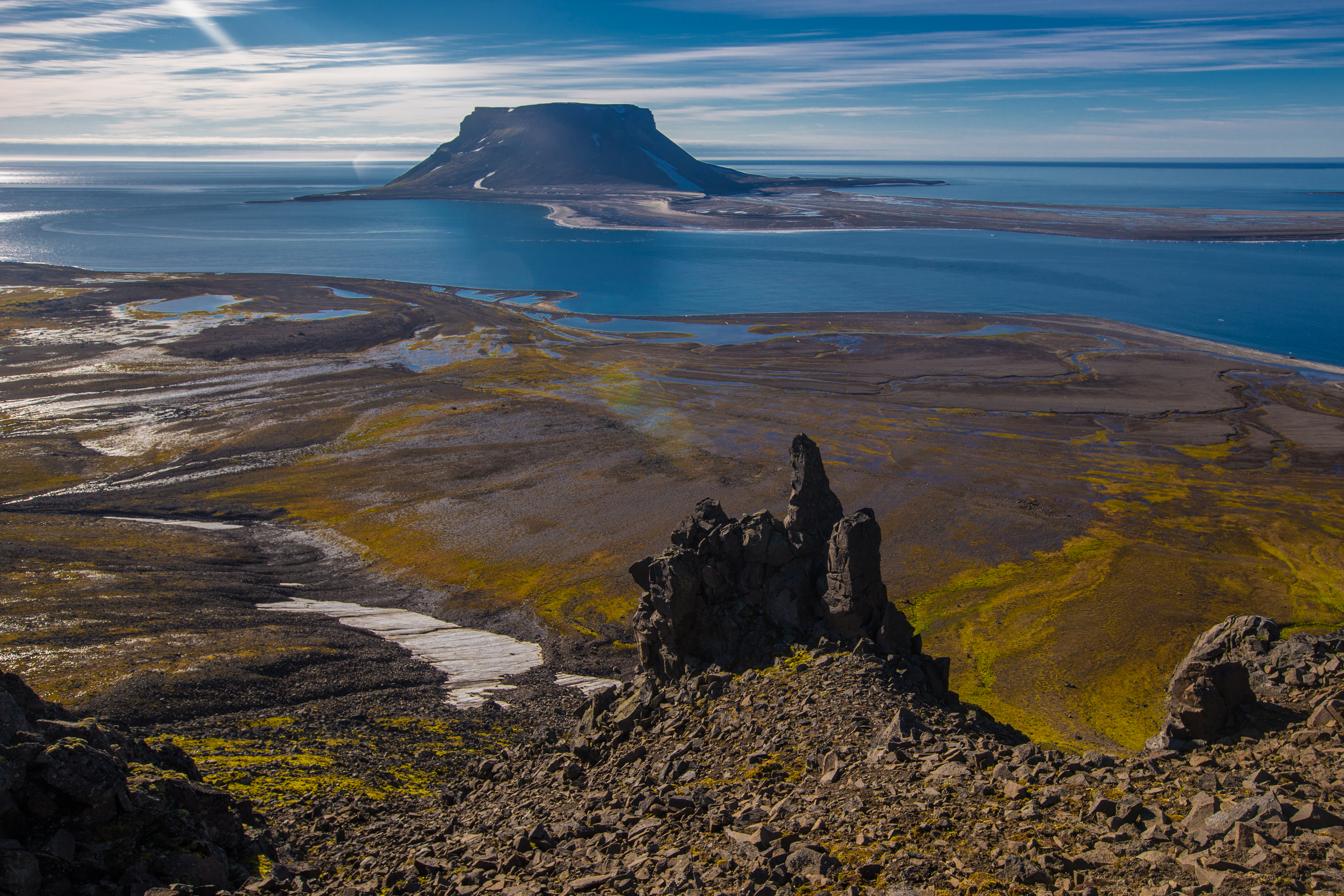
Bell Island

The archipelago comprises 191 uninhabited islands with a combined area of 16,134 square kilometers (6,229 sq mi). These stretch 375 kilometers (233 mi) from east to west and 234 kilometers (145 mi) from north to south. One can categorize the islands into three groups, a western, central and eastern, separated by the British Channel and the Austrian Strait. The central group is further divided into a northern and southern section by the Markham Strait. Graham Bell Island is separated from the eastern group by the Severo–Vostochnyi Strait. There are two named island clusters: Zichy Land north of Markham Sound; and Belaya Zemlya to the extreme northeast. The straits are narrow, between several hundred meters to 3 kilometers (2 mi) wide. They reach depths of 500 to 600 meters (1,600 to 2,000 ft), 150 to 300 meters (500 to 1,000 ft) below the shelf of the Barents Sea.

The largest island is Prince George Land, which measures 2,741 square kilometers (1,058 sq mi). Three additional islands exceed 1,000 square kilometers (390 sq mi) in size: Wilczek Land, Graham Bell Island and Alexandra Land. Five more islands exceed 500 square kilometers (190 sq mi): Hall Island, Salisbury Island, McClintock Island, Jackson Island and Hooker Island. The smallest 135 islands constitute 0.4 percent of the archipelago's area. The highest elevation is a peak on Wilczek Land, which rises 670 meters (2,200 ft) above mean sea level. Victoria Island, located 170 kilometers (110 mi) to the west of Alexandra Land, is administratively part of the archipelago, but the island is not geographically part of the island group and is closer to Svalbard, located 60 kilometers (37 mi) from Kvitøya.

== Geology ==
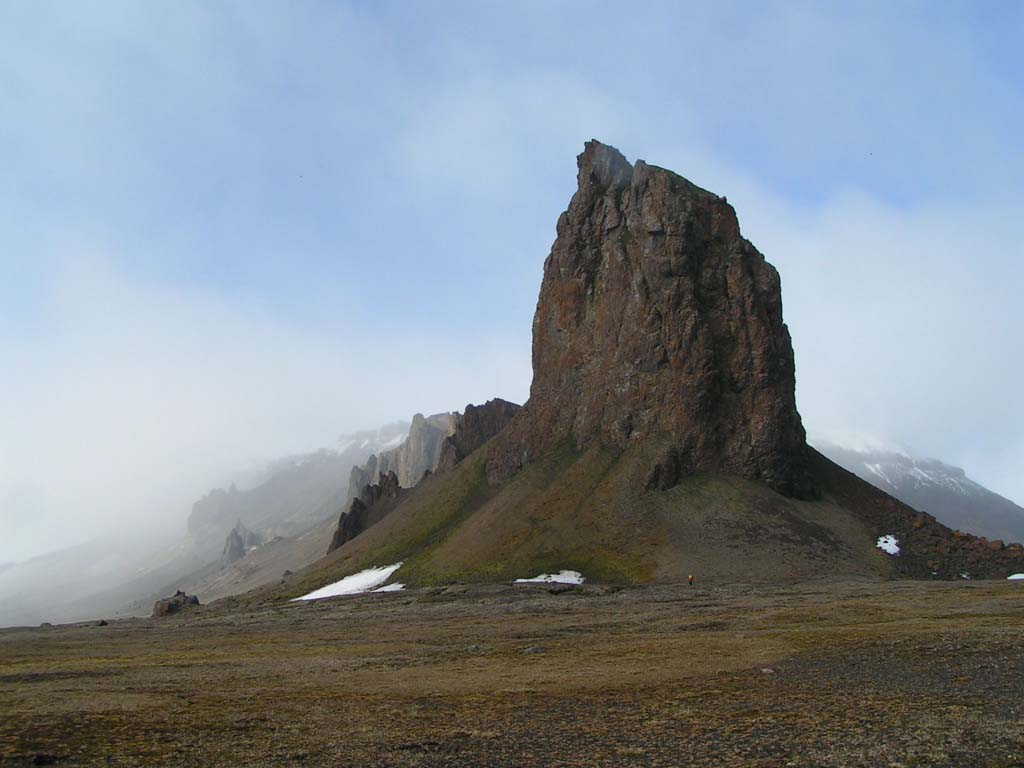
Cape Tegetthoff on Hall Island.

Geologically the archipelago is located on the northern edge of the Barents Sea Platform, within an area where Mesozoic sedimentary rocks are exposed. The area has four units separated by regional erosion surfaces. The Upper Paleozoic unit is poorly exposed and was created by folding during the Caledonian period. The Lower Mesozoic unit, consisting of coastal and marine sediments from the Upper Triassic period, is present on most islands and on the bottom of the straits and consists of limestones, shales, sandstones and conglomerate.

The Upper Mesozoic unit dominates in the southern and western parts, consisting of massive effusive rocks made up of basaltic sheets separated by volcanic ashes and tuffs, mixed with terrigenous rocks with layers of coal. The Mesozoic-Tertiary unit remains mostly on the sea floor and consist of marine quartz sandstones and shales. Plate tectonics of the Arctic Ocean created basalt lavas and dolerite sheets and dykes in the Upper Jurassic and Lower Cretaceous periods. The land is rising by 2.5 to 3.0 millimeters (0.098 to 0.118 in) per year, due to the melting of the Barents Sea Ice Sheet c. 10,000 years ago.

== Hydrology ==
Franz Josef Land is dominated by glaciation, which covers an area of 13,735 square kilometers (5,303 sq mi), or 85 percent of the archipelago. The glaciers have an average thickness of 180 meters (590 ft), which would convert to 2,500 cubic kilometers (600 cu mi). This would alone give a 6 millimeters (0.24 in) eustatic rise in sea level should it melt. Large ice-free areas are only found on the largest islands, such as the 499.8-square-kilometer (193.0 sq mi) Armitage Peninsula of George Land, the 493.7-square-kilometer (190.6 sq mi) Kholmistyi Peninsula of Graham Bell Island, the 270-square-kilometer (100 sq mi) Central'naya Susha of Alexandra Land, the 162.6-square-kilometer (62.8 sq mi) Ganza Point of Wilczek Land and the 84.2-square-kilometer (32.5 sq mi) Heyes Island. Most of the smaller islands are unglaciated.

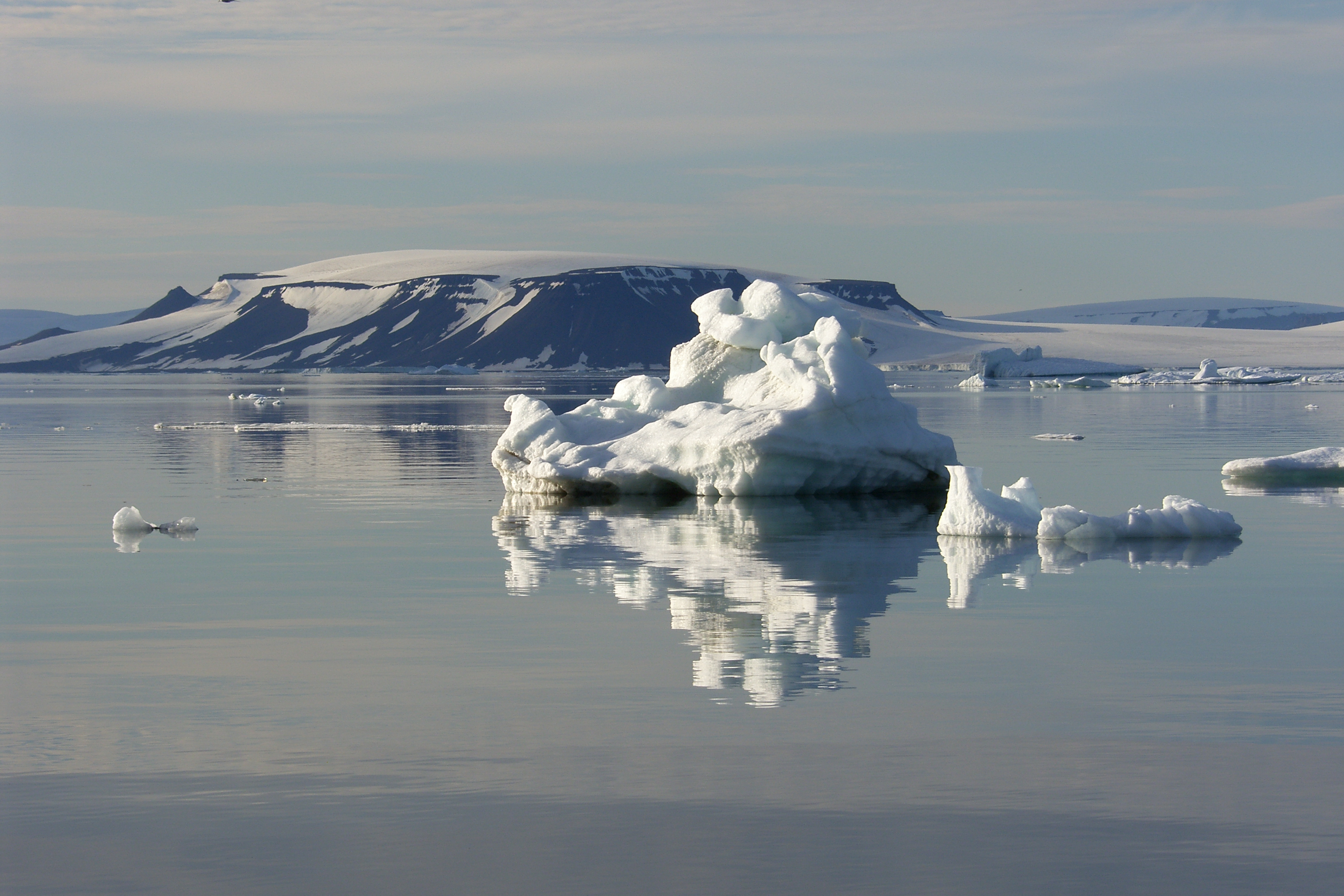
Iceberg at Heiss Island in September 2007.

Streams only form during the runoff period from May through early September. Permafrost causes most of the runoff to take place on the surface, with streams only forming on the largest islands. The longest river is 19 kilometers (12 mi) long and forms on George Land, while there are several streams on Alexandra Land, the longest being 8.4 kilometers (5.2 mi). There are about one thousand lakes in the archipelago, the majority of which are located on Alexandra Land and George Land. Most lakes are located in depressions caused by glacial erosion, in addition to a smaller number of lagoon lakes. Their sizes vary from 2 square kilometers (0.77 sq mi) to 0.4 hectares (0.99 acres). Most are only 2 meters (6 ft 7 in) deep, with the deepest measured at 10 meters (33 ft).

The sea currents surrounding the archipelago touch eastern Svalbard and northern Novaya Zemlya. The cold Makarov Current flows from the north and the Arctic Current flows from the northwest, while the warmer Novaya Zemlya Current flows from the south. The latter has temperatures over 0.5 °C (32.9 °F), while the bottom water lies below −1.7 °C (28.9 °F). The southern coastal regions of the archipelago experience currents from east to west. Average velocity is between 2 and 5 centimeters (0.79 and 1.97 in) per second. The tidal component in coastal areas is 15 centimeters (5.9 in) per second. Pack ice occurs throughout the year around the entire island group, with the lowest levels being during August and September. One-year winter ice starts forming in October and reaches a thickness of 1.5 meters (4 ft 11 in). Icebergs are common year-round.

== Climate ==
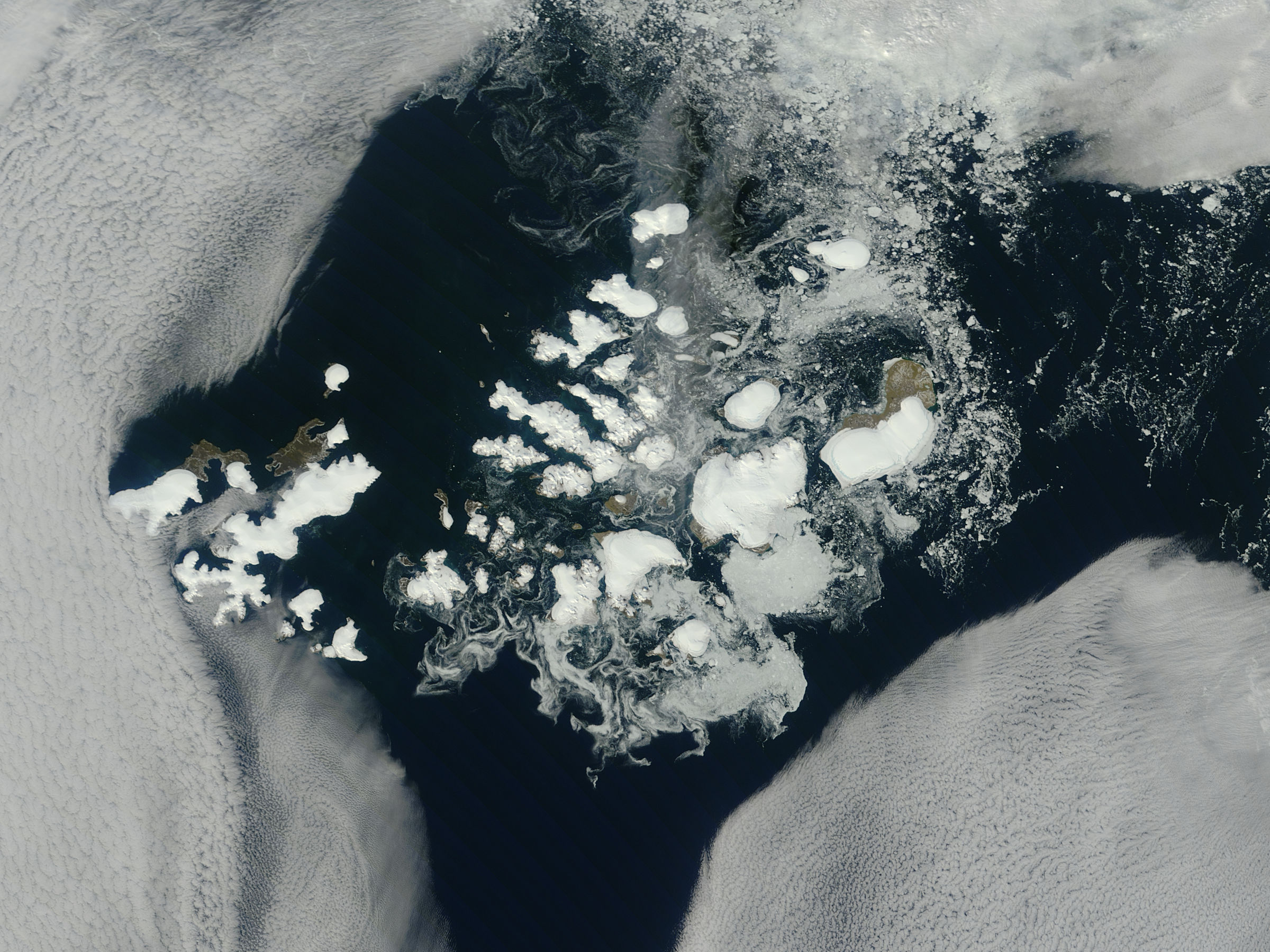
Satellite image of Franz Josef Land from August 2011.

Franz Josef Land is in a transition zone between an ice cap climate (EF) and a tundra climate (ET), technically falling into the latter because July and August average above freezing, nevertheless, low temperatures remain below freezing year round. The main forces influencing the climate are the glaciation and sea ice. At 81° north the archipelago experiences 141 annual days of midnight sun, from 12 April to 30 August. During the winter it experiences 128 days of polar night from 19 October to 23 February. Abundant cloud cover further cools the climate. The sea starts to freeze in late September and reaches its annual maximum in March, at which time ninety-five percent of the sea is ice-covered. The ice coverage starts to decrease in May and experiences major melting in June, with the minimum occurring in August or early September.

During winter, high-pressure weather and clear skies cause radiation loss from the ground, sending temperatures down to −40 °C (−40 °F). During shifts the temperatures can change by 20 °C (36 °F) within hours. Coastal stations experience mean January temperatures of between −20 °C (−4 °F) and −30 °C (−22 °F), varying heavily from year to year depending on the degree of cycles in weather patterns. During summer the temperatures are a lot more even and average at between 0 °C (32 °F) and 3 °C (37 °F) at Hayes Island. Fog is most common during the summer. Average annual precipitation at the coastal stations is between 100 and 150 millimetres (3.9 and 5.9 in), with the wettest months being from July through September. Elevated areas can experience considerably higher precipitation. Franz Josef Land is significantly colder than Spitsbergen, which experiences 8 °C (14 °F) warmer winter averages, but is warmer than the Canadian Arctic Archipelago.

Climate data for Ernst Krenkel Observatory, Heiss Island
Month	Jan	Feb	Mar	Apr	May	Jun	Jul	Aug	Sep	Oct	Nov	Dec	Year
Record high °C (°F)	1.9 (35.4)	0.0 (32.0)	1.6 (34.9)	0.7 (33.3)	2.6 (36.7)	8.0 (46.4)	10.3 (50.5)	8.4 (47.1)	5.6 (42.1)	3.8 (38.8)	1.3 (34.3)	1.7 (35.1)	10.3 (50.5)
Mean daily maximum °C (°F)	−19.2 (−2.6)	−19.5 (−3.1)	−19.4 (−2.9)	−15.6 (3.9)	−6.5 (20.3)	0.1 (32.2)	2.1 (35.8)	1.4 (34.5)	−1.2 (29.8)	−8.1 (17.4)	−13.9 (7.0)	−18.4 (−1.1)	−9.9 (14.2)
Daily mean °C (°F)	−22.7 (−8.9)	−23.1 (−9.6)	−23 (−9)	−18.7 (−1.7)	−8.7 (16.3)	−1.4 (29.5)	0.7 (33.3)	0.1 (32.2)	−2.7 (27.1)	−10.4 (13.3)	−17.4 (0.7)	−21.8 (−7.2)	−12.4 (9.7)
Mean daily minimum °C (°F)	−26.2 (−15.2)	−26.5 (−15.7)	−26.5 (−15.7)	−21.6 (−6.9)	−10.8 (12.6)	−2.8 (27.0)	−0.3 (31.5)	−1.0 (30.2)	−4.2 (24.4)	−12.9 (8.8)	−20.3 (−4.5)	−25.1 (−13.2)	−14.9 (5.2)
Record low °C (°F)	−42.1 (−43.8)	−44.4 (−47.9)	−43.5 (−46.3)	−39.6 (−39.3)	−27.7 (−17.9)	−12.3 (9.9)	−4.3 (24.3)	−8.5 (16.7)	−23.2 (−9.8)	−32.3 (−26.1)	−39.5 (−39.1)	−41.5 (−42.7)	−44.4 (−47.9)
Average precipitation mm (inches)	32 (1.3)	31 (1.2)	20 (0.8)	15 (0.6)	13 (0.5)	10 (0.4)	18 (0.7)	22 (0.9)	26 (1.0)	21 (0.8)	24 (0.9)	27 (1.1)	259 (10.2)
Average rainy days	0.1	0.1	0	0.1	0.5	3	12	12	6	0.5	0.1	0	34
Average snowy days	20	19	19	16	22	15	7	10	18	24	21	19	209
Average relative humidity (%)	83	82	80	81	85	88	91	92	90	86	84	83	85
Source: Pogoda i Klimat

== Nature ==
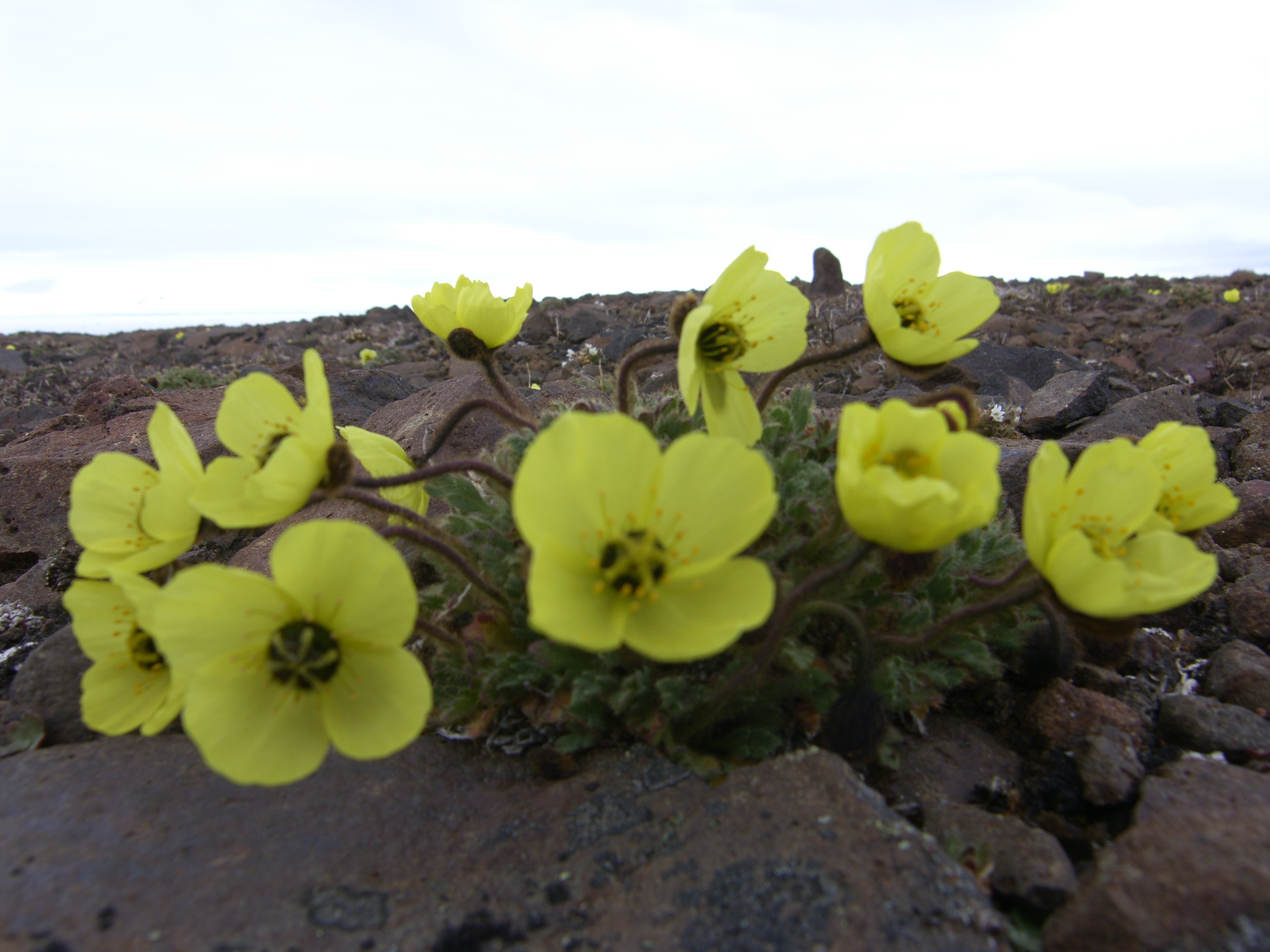
Arctic poppy on Heiss Island

The climate and permafrost limits soil development in the archipelago. Large areas are devoid of soil, with permafrost polygons being the most common site for soil to occur. The soil typically has incomplete soil profiles and polygonal form with rich content of iron and is either neutral or slightly acidic. The brown upper humus layers have three percent organic matter, increasing to eight percent in the southernmost islands. Arctic desert soils occur on the eastern group islands, while the areas near the edge of the glaciers have bog-like arctic soil.

The flora varies between islands, based on the natural conditions. On some islands, vegetation is limited to lichen growing on stones. Vegetation typically covers five to ten percent of the ground surface, with notable exceptions under bird colonies where it can reach one hundred percent. Vegetation varies with the altitude: up to 120 to 130 meters (390 to 430 ft) there is a belt of grass-moss arctic desert, then moss-lichen arctic desert to 175 to 200 meters (574 to 656 ft), then lichen arctic desert up to 250 to 315 meters (820 to 1,033 ft) and above lifeless snow desert, with occasional lichens on nunataks and snow algae on glacier surfaces.

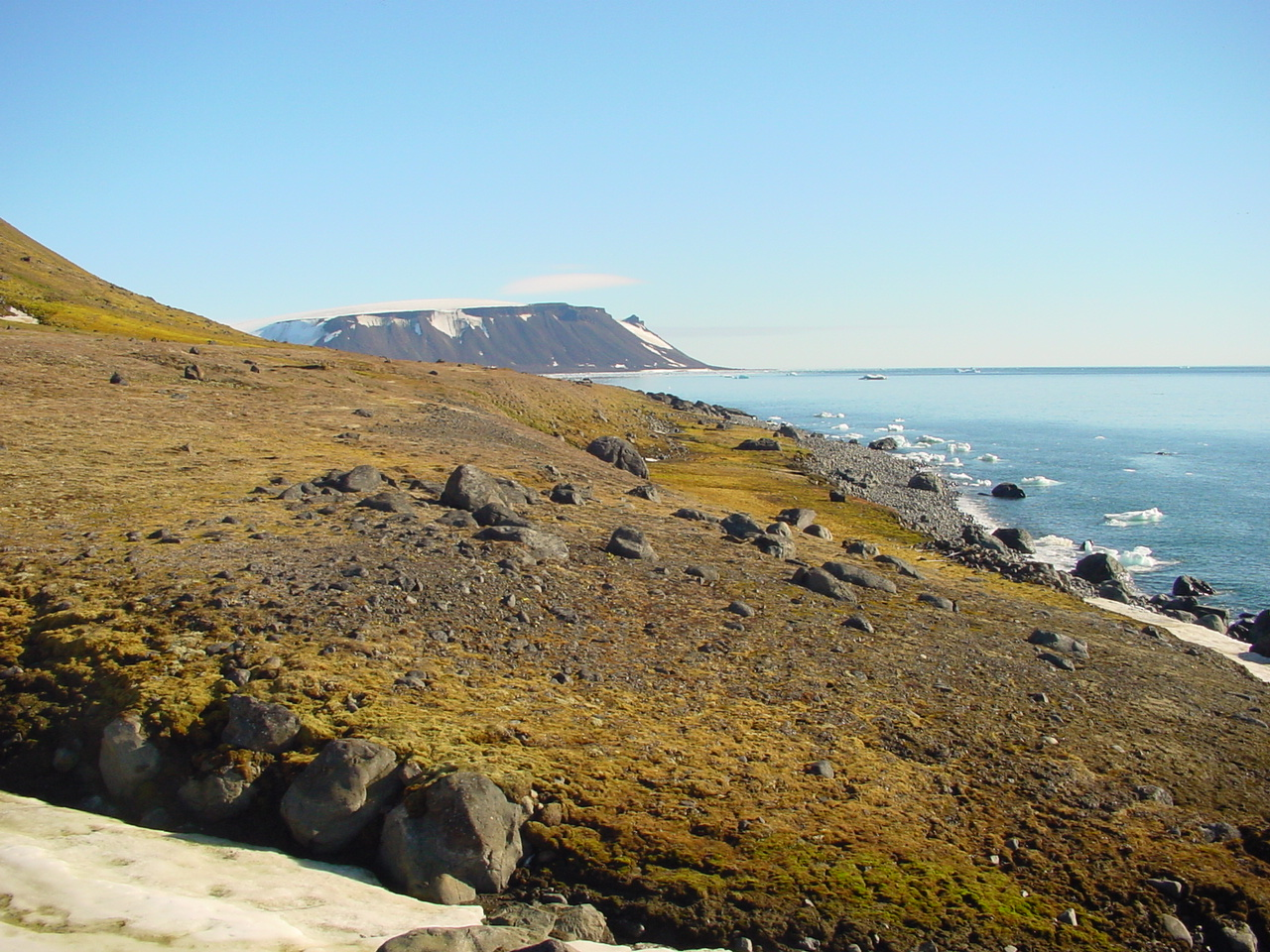
Northbrook Island

Trees, shrubs and tall plants cannot survive. About 150 species of bryophytes dominate the grassy turf, of which two-thirds are mosses and a third liverworts. The most common species are Aulacomnium, Ditrichum, Drepanocladus, Orthothecium and Tomenthypnum. More than 100 species of lichen are found on the island, the most common being Caloplaca, Lecanora, Lecidea, Ochrolechia and Rinodina. There are sixteen species of grass and about 100 species of algae, most commonly Cyanophyta and Diatomea. Fifty-seven species of vascular plants have been reported. The most common are Arctic poppy and saxifraga, which grow everywhere, independent of habitat, with the latter's nine species being found on all islands. Common plants in wet areas are Alopecurus magellanicus (alpine meadow-foxtail grass), buttercups and polar willow. Alopecurus magellanicus and Papaver dahlianum are the tallest plants, able to reach heights of 30 centimeters (12 in).

More than one hundred taxa of single-cell pelagic algae have been identified around the archipelago, the most common being Thalassiosira antarctica and Chaetoceros decipiens. The bloom takes place between May and August. Of the roughly fifty species of zooplankton, calanoids dominate, with Calanus glacialis and Calanus hyperboreus constituting the greater portion of the biomass. On the sea bottom there are 34 species of macroalgae and at least 500 species of macrofauna. Most common are crustaceans such as amphipods and shrimps, polychaetes and echinoderms, such as sea bristles. The ice scouring causes there to be little life in the littoral zone, but the sublittoral zone (2 to 25 meters (6 ft 7 in to 82 ft 0 in)) is dominated by laminaria, most commonly Laminaria sachcharina, and red algae, such as Phycodrys rubens.

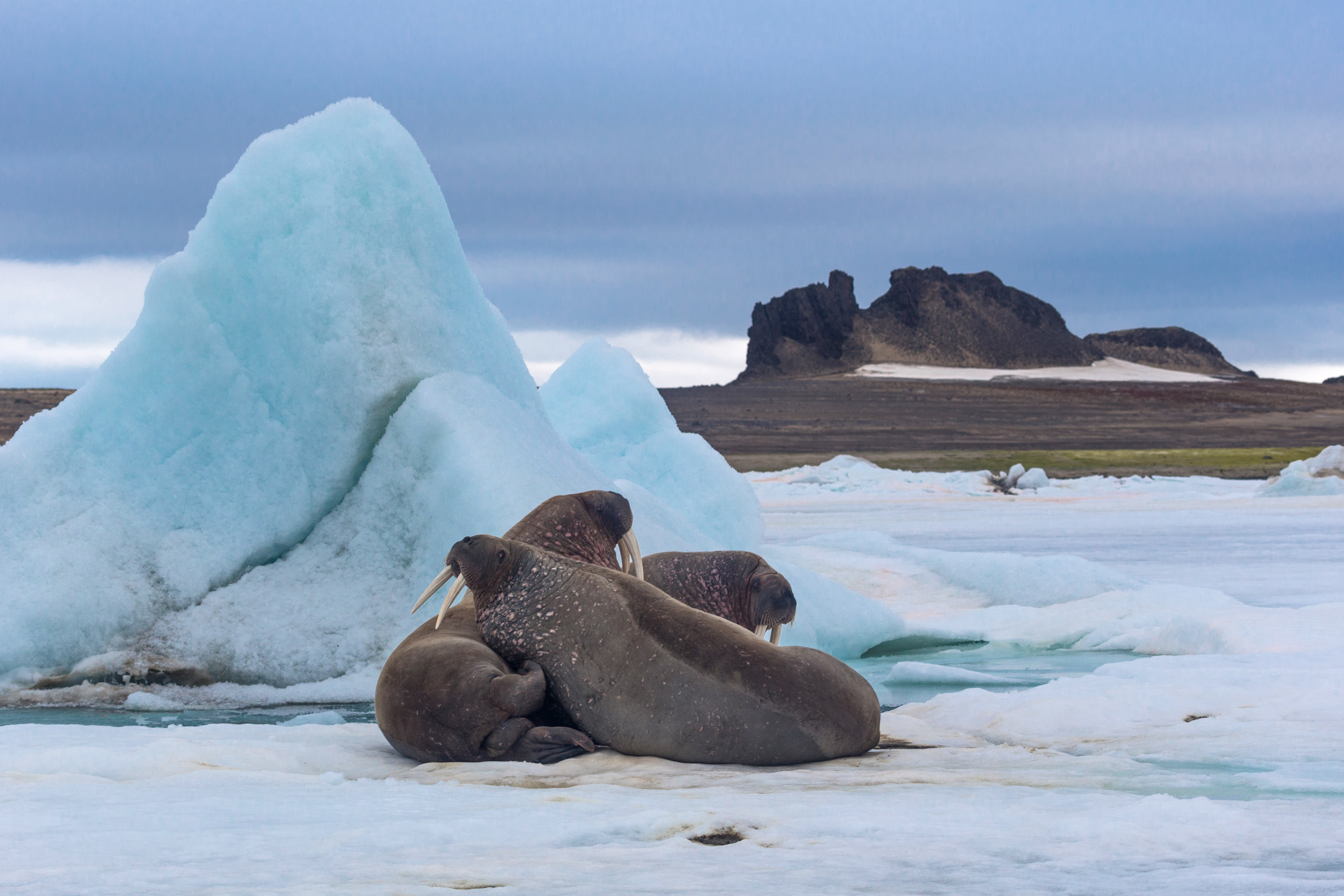
Walrus on Heiss Island

There are 33 species of fish in the waters, none of which are abundant or commercially exploitable. The most common are polar cod, which reach lengths of 20 centimeters (7.9 in), and liparidae. There are no endemic species within the archipelago. Forty-one species of birds have been documented in the archipelago, of which fourteen breed. These are dominated by seabirds such as fulmar, kittiwake, Brünnich's guillemot, black guillemot and little auk are common throughout the archipelago, while seven other species prefer nesting on flat tundra: common eider, purple sandpiper, Arctic skua, glaucous gull, ivory gull, Arctic tern and snow bunting. Some ivory gulls, little auks and Brünnich's guillemots opt to spend the winter on the islands.

The polar bear population of Franz Josef Land lies within the Barents Sea subpopulation, which also includes polar bears inhabiting Svalbard and the western coast of Novaya Zemlya. In 2004, the Barents Sea subpopulation was estimated at 2,650. There is also a population of Arctic fox, which typically have their territories near seabird habitats.

There are no caribou living on Franz Josef Land today. However, radiocarbon dating of shed antlers found on Alexandra Land in 1990 has shown that there was a population of caribou living on the island around 4000 to 2000 years ago. It is likely that the population died out when the climate became colder.

=== Marine mammals ===
As a declared marine mammal sanctuary, the area around the islands has a rich biodiversity of rare marine mammals.

Three species of seals habit the archipelago. Harp seal is the most common, although it breeds in the White Sea. Slightly less common is the bearded seal. Walruses were previously hunted, dramatically reducing the formerly abundant species. They have been internationally protected since 1952 and their numbers have since been on the rise, with between one and three thousand walruses living in the archipelago. The population is common with Svalbard and northern Novaya Zemlya.

Minke whales, humpback whale, and beluga whales are commonly seen around the island, and less commonly orcas and narwhales, with the archipelago being located on the northern edge of their summer range. Fin whales were recently confirmed to migrate into the waters.

Occasionally there are sightings of bowhead whale. The Russian Arctic stock of this species, ranging from Cape Farewell in Greenland and Svalbard/Spitsbergen areas to East Siberian Sea is considered to be the most endangered of all bowhead populations in the world. The waters around Franz Josef Land appear to be the most important place for this stock.

== Human activity ==
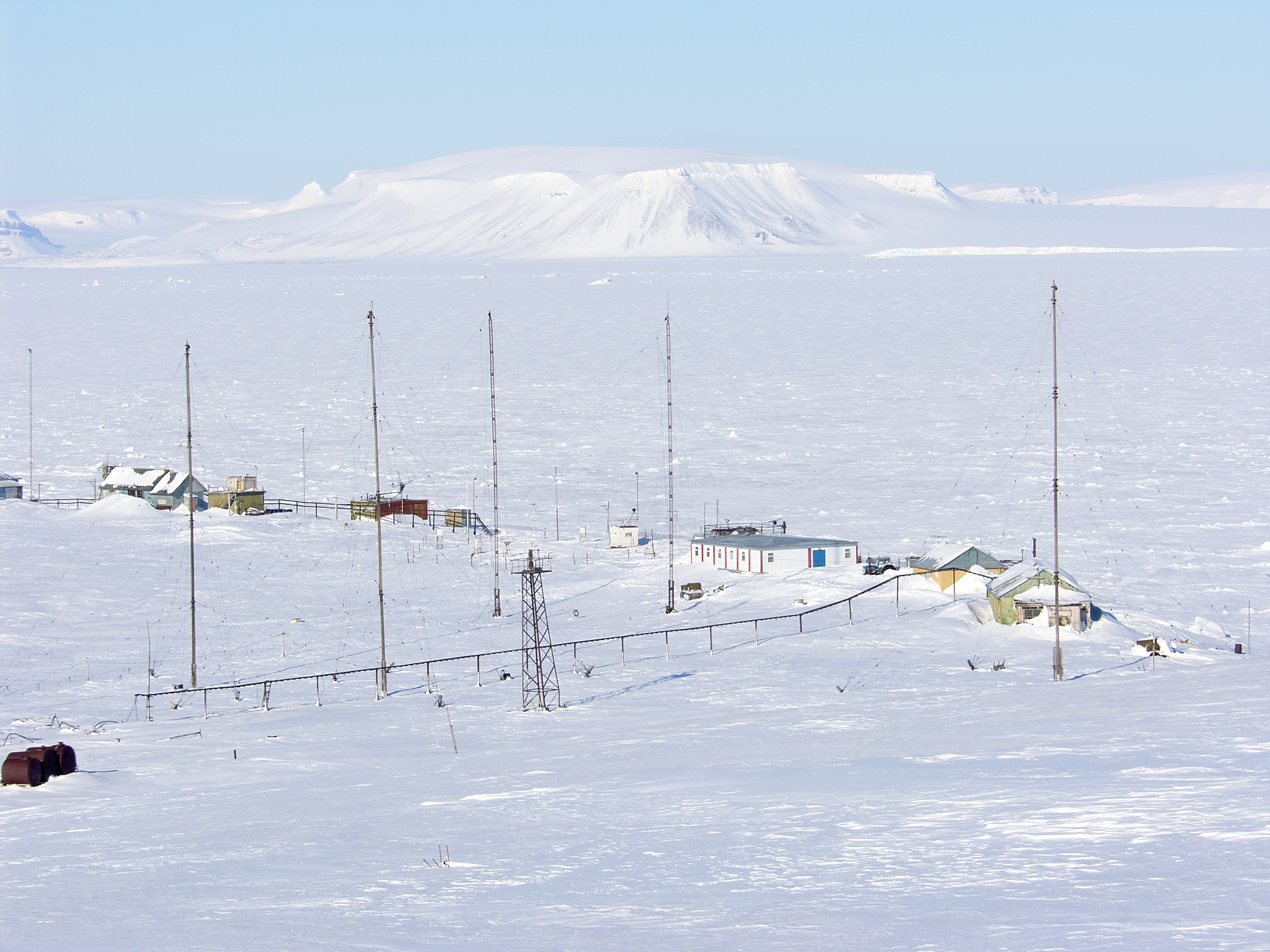
Polar Geophysical Observatory on Heiss Island

Tourism travel to the archipelago is severely limited. There is no infrastructure to support tourists and the only way to reach the islands is by icebreaker, typically operating out of Murmansk. Franz Josef Land has never been inhabited by an indigenous population. In 2012 there were only eight successful landings on the islands. A contributing factor to the low utilization is the difficulty of obtaining permissions and frequent closing of the Kola Bay to accommodate military exercises. The most frequent service is a three-week North Pole tour with Russian nuclear-powered icebreaker 50 Let Pobedy, which stops by the islands en route. The most popular destinations are areas with bird cliffs and walrus colonies, such as Cape Flora on Northbrook Island and Cape Rubini on Hooker Island, as well as historical remains such as Nansen's hut on Jackson Island. Tourists are commonly landed by helicopter. For purposes of amateur radio awards the islands count as a separate international entity. Activity by radio operators has become less frequent, though it does occasionally occur. Nagurskoye Air Base is located on the Northern part of Alexandra Land. It was extensively upgraded in the mid-2010s to support a greater military presence.

== See also ==
- Barents Sea
- List of islands of Russia
- Svalbard
