= Zemlya Georga =

Island in the Russian Arctic

Russian: Земля Георга
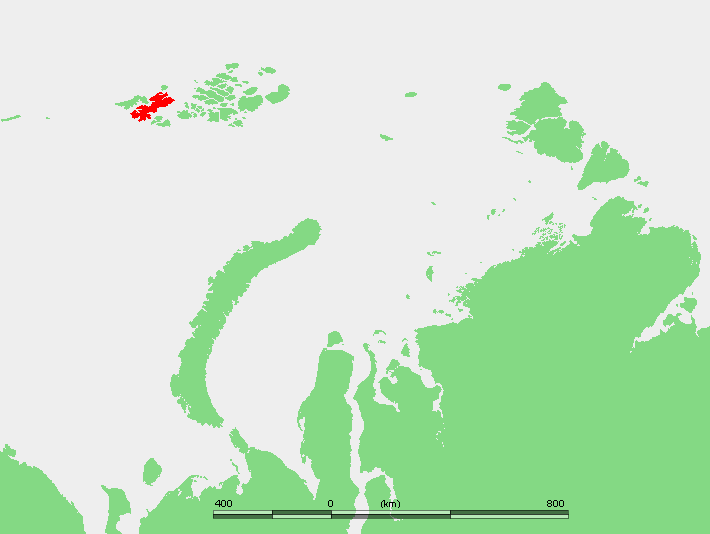
- Location of Zemlya Georga in the Franz Josef Archipelago

- Location within Russia

Geography
- Location: Arctic Ocean
- Coordinates: 80°26′43″N 49°00′45″E
- Archipelago: Franz Josef Land
- Area: 2,821 km^{2} (1,089 sq mi)
- Length: 115 km (71.5 mi)
- Highest elevation: 416 m (1365 ft)
- Highest point: Brusilov Ice Dome

Administration
- Russia

Zemlya Georga, or Prince George Land (Russian: Земля Георга; Zemlya Georga, "George Land"), is the largest island in Franz Josef Land, Arkhangelsk Oblast, Russian Arctic.

Zemlya Georga was named by Frederick George Jackson after Prince George.

== Geography ==
With a total surface of 2,821 square kilometres (1,089 sq mi), slightly larger than Luxembourg, Zemlya Georga is the largest island of the Franz Josef Archipelago. It is also the longest, with a distance of 115 kilometres (71 mi) between its northernmost and its southernmost ends. The highest point of the island is the summit of Brusilov Ice Dome, the northeastern ice dome, at 416 metres (1,365 ft).

The island has a complex coastline, with many bays, deep inlets and capes. Zemlya Georga has three capes pointing southwestwards on its southern coast: Cape Neale (the westernmost end of the island), Cape Crowther and Cape Grant. Its easternmost cape is known as Mys Murray. The two capes pointing north, Mys Bryusa and Mys Battenberg, are separated from each other by Sommerville Bay. The westernmost cape of this peninsula is Mys Mul'tanovskogo, beyond which lies the sound known as Proliv Arkhangelskiy between Zemlya Georga and Alexandra Land. The sound known as Cambridge Channel (Proliv Kambritch) is located further to the southwest. There are no permanent inhabitants on the island however there is a seasonal research station which can shelter up to 10 persons.

The Nightingale Channel (Proliv Neytingeyl) runs east of Zemlya Georga, separating it from Bruce Island.

=== Glaciers ===
Most of the land lies under large glaciers and ice domes, such as the Brusilov Ice Dome, Gretton Ice Dome, Dzegudze Ice Dome (Купол Дзегудзе), Zander Ice Dome, Foggy Ice Dome (Купол туманный), Arctic Geology Research Institute Ice Dome (Купол Научно-исследовательский институт геологии Арктики) and the Peary Ice Dome, although there is a large, mostly unglacierized peninsula at its northern end, Poluostrov Armitidzh.

=== Adjacent Islands ===
- David Island (Ostrovok Davida), lat 80.15 N long 47.33 E, is a small islet located off Zemlya Georga's southwestern point.
- Arthur Island lies north of Zemlya Georga's northernmost end, separated from it by the sound known as Proliv Li-Smita.

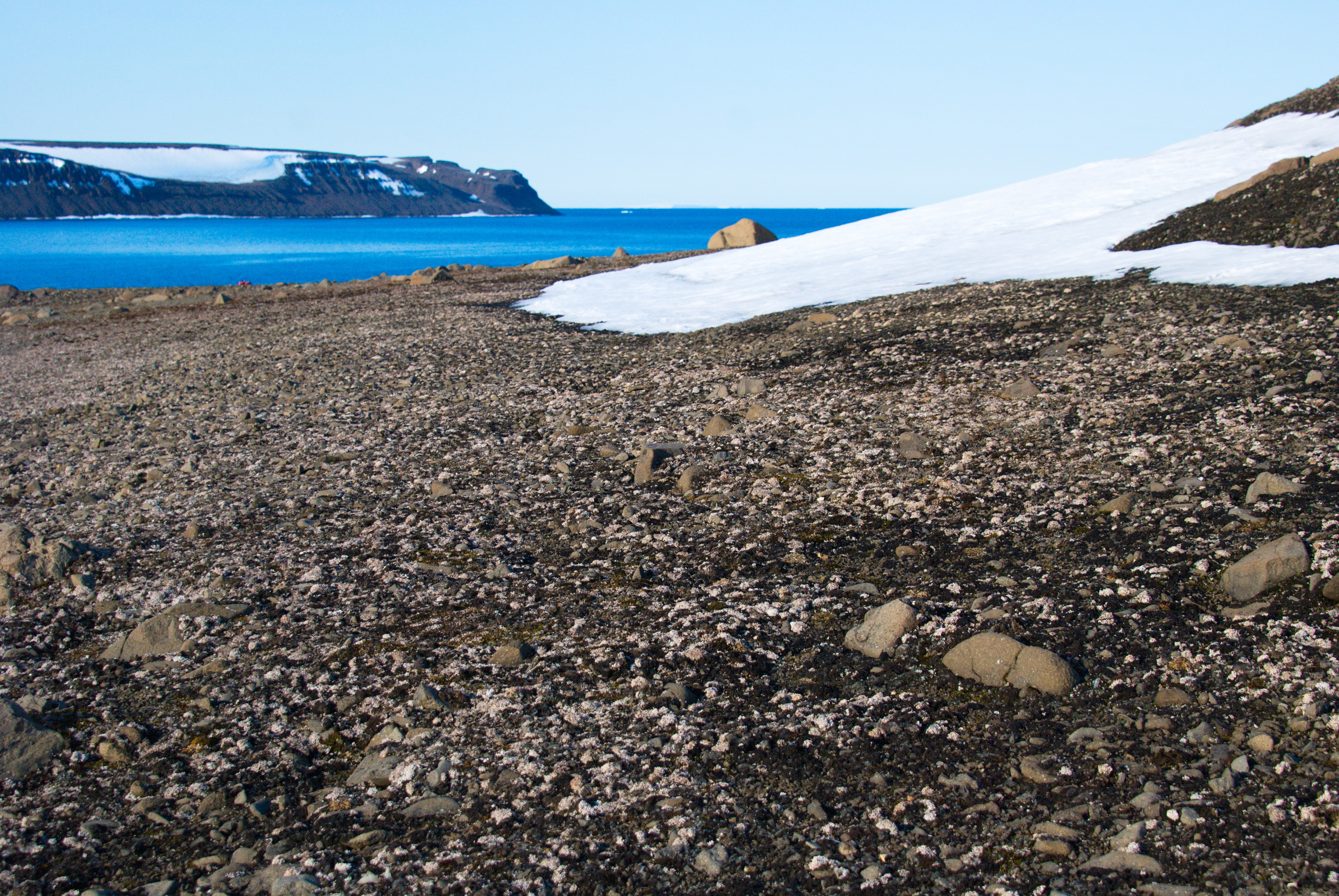
The Geographers Bay, Zemlya Georga, Franz Josef Land

Western Franz Josef Land map section.

== History ==
British explorer Benjamin Leigh Smith, discovered Zemlya Georga in 1880.

The Jackson–Harmsworth expedition established in 1897 that the land discovered by Leigh Smith is composed of two separate islands, the other being today's Alexandra Land.

== Image gallery ==
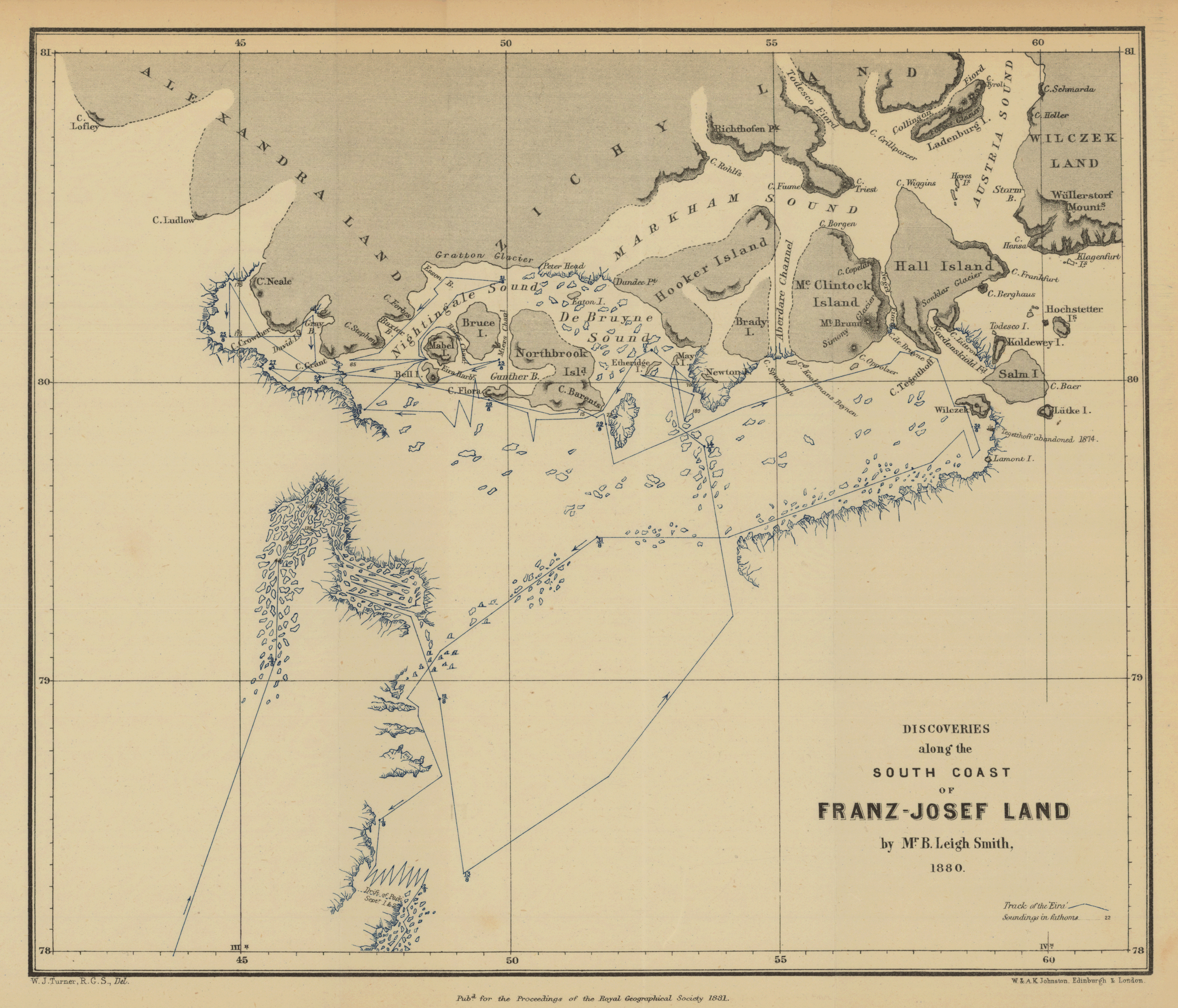
Map from the 1880 expedition by Benjamin Leigh Smith with the south coast of Zemlya Georga partially mapped

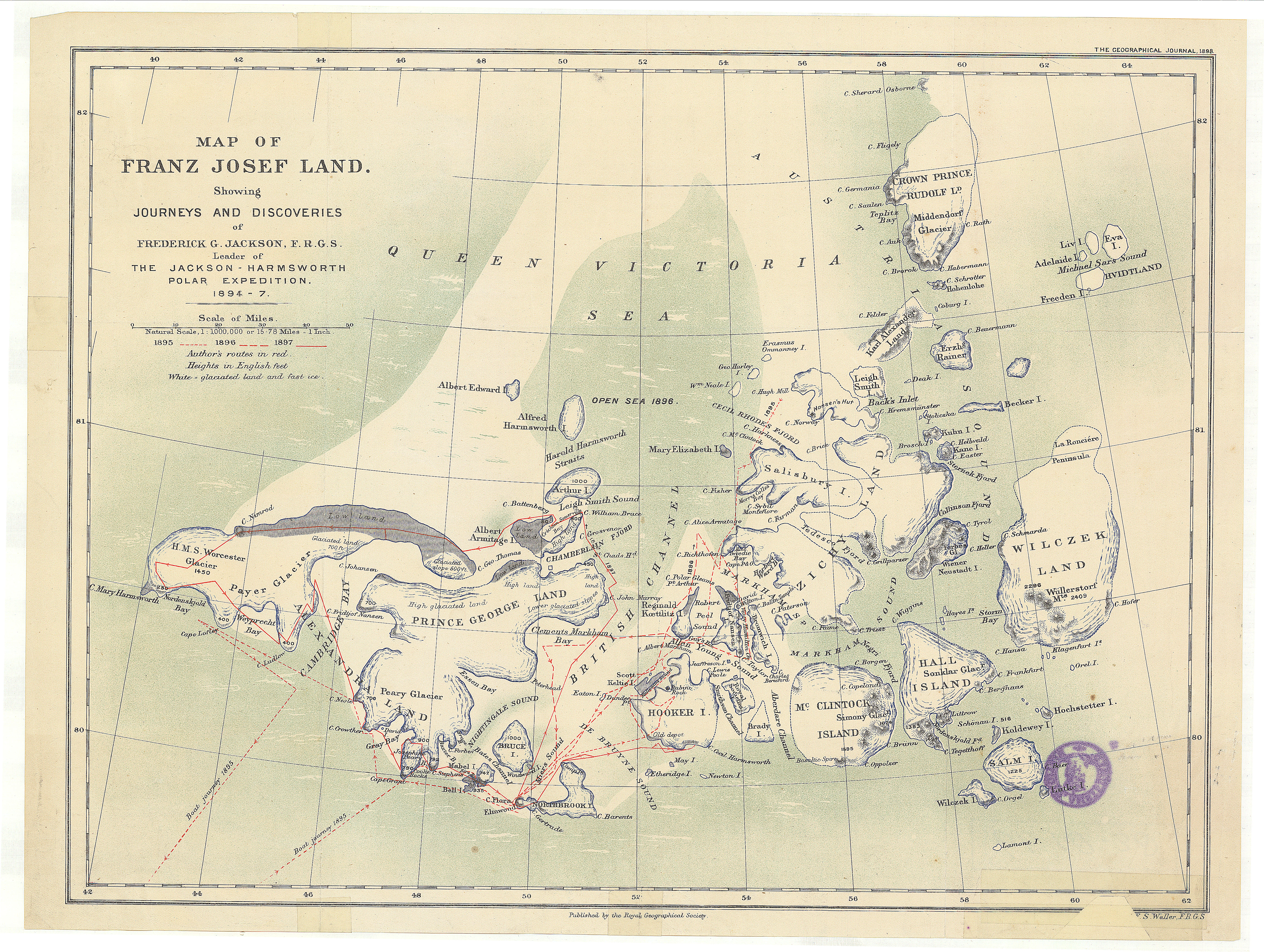
Zemlya Georga as a separate island on a 1898 map of Franz Josef Land showing the explorations of Frederick Jackson

== See also ==
- List of islands of Russia
- List of glaciers of Russia
