= The Red Tent (film) =

- Soviet billboard theatrical poster of the film
- Directed by: Mikhail Kalatozov
- Written by: Yuri Nagibin; Richard L. Adams; Ennio De Concini; Robert Bolt (uncredited)
- Based on: The Red Tent by Yuri Nagibin
- Produced by: Franco Cristaldi; Victor Freilich
- Starring: Sean Connery; Claudia Cardinale; Hardy Krüger; Peter Finch; Massimo Girotti; Luigi Vannucchi; Eduard Martsevich; Mario Adorf
- Cinematography: Leonid Kalashnikov
- Edited by: John Shirley; Peter Zinner
- Music by: Ennio Morricone (international version); Aleksandr Zatsepin
- Distributed by: Mosfilm; Vides Cinematografica; Empresa Hispanoamericana de Video; Paramount Home Video; Paramount Pictures; Sovexportfilm
- Release dates: 1969 (USSR); 23 December 1969 (Italy); 29 July 1971 (USA)
- Running time: 158 min (Russian version); 121 min (International version)
- Countries: USSR; Italy
- Language: Russian / Italian / English
- Budget: $10,000,000 or $13 million

The Red Tent (Russian: Красная палатка, translit. Krasnaya palatka; Italian: La tenda rossa) is a joint Soviet/Italian 1969 adventure drama film directed by Mikhail Kalatozov.

The film is based on the story of the 1928 mission to rescue Umberto Nobile and the other survivors of the crash of the airship Italia. It features Sean Connery as Roald Amundsen and Peter Finch as Nobile. The script was adapted by Yuri Nagibin and Mikhail Kalatozov from Nagibin's novel of the same title. Nagibin couldn't complete the script due to a series of conflicts with the producer, who insisted on expanding the role of his paramour Claudia Cardinale, and it was completed by de Concini and Bolt.

== Plot ==
In Rome, Nobile has endured years of scorn for his actions during a disastrous expedition and its aftermath. He imagines a court of inquiry against him, where witnesses and judges are his former crewmen – including Captain Zappi, his navigator and his meteorologist Finn Malmgren. Also arrayed against him are Valeria, Malmgren's lover, Captain Romagna, one of the expedition's would-be rescuers, famed aviator Lundborg, professor Samoilovich, chief of the Soviet rescue mission, his pilot Boris Chukhnovsky, and Roald Amundsen, who died in the search for survivors of Nobile's expedition.

As the court of inquiry tries Nobile, the events of the expedition and its failure are depicted. The expedition is successful at first, but ends in disaster. The Italia is weighed down when ice forms on it. Colliding with the ground, the airship's gondola is torn away from its keel and the envelope containing the airship's hydrogen cells; freed of the weight of the gondola, the rest of the ship floats away and out of control, taking some of Nobile's crew with it.

Nobile maintains control of the surviving crew who are now marooned on arctic pack ice with salvaged supplies. They shelter in a tent that they dye red for visibility. They manage to repair the radio, but after receiving no response to their distress calls, three survivors (Zappi, Mariano, and Malmgren) decide to set off across the ice to seek help. The survivors' distress signal is picked up by a Russian radio operator, and the Soviet Union sends the icebreaker Krassin to their rescue. The ship sustains damage en route. Nobile's group is first found by Lundborg, a Swedish pilot who lands on the ice. The aviator insists he can only take Nobile. Nobile agrees, believing that he can best assist the rescue from Kings Bay. These efforts are blocked: Nobile learns that his superiors in Rome have stripped him of command for apparently abandoning his crew, and he is ordered confined to his room and to have no role in the rescue. Desperate, Nobile contacts Prof. Samoilovich to implore him to resume the search for the survivors.

Amundsen joins the rescue effort as well, but disappears, becoming another victim of Nobile's expedition. In Nobile's vision, Amundsen explains that he died after his plane was blown off-course. Flying north, Amundsen's party eventually finds the wreckage of the Italia, spotting what appeared to be survivors. Amundsen orders his pilot, René Guilbaud, to land. Instead, the plane crashes, with Amundsen the sole survivor. On inspecting the wreck, Amundsen realizes that he is doomed, finding nothing to build shelter or fire with, no supplies and no hope of rescue. The men who appeared to be survivors when seen from the air were already long dead.

The group who left on foot in search of help encounter difficulties, and are forced to leave Malmgren to die. Back at camp, the ice begins to break apart, and the survivors there escape from the gondola before it sinks. Alone on the ice, Nobile's survivors spot the Krassin on the horizon. As the ship nears for a rescue, they see Zappi and Mariano waving at them from its deck.

Pressed for a vote at the court of inquiry, Samoilovich defends Nobile's actions, noting that his rescue of the survivors was a direct result of Nobile's escape to King's Bay. Neither can he fault Nobile's apparent lack of heroism because a captain has no right to risk his own safety by individual acts of heroism. The others reach a verdict of guilty, but Amundsen discounts it, finding each of the accusers unfit to judge for various reasons, including indifference to others and emotional sterility, but mostly for their bitterness. The accusers file out of Nobile's apartment, Amundsen being the last. With Amundsen, Nobile reveals his feelings of guilt for leaving the men on the ice. While Nobile admits that his decision to join Lundborg was based on various reasons, some correct while others were wrong, his first thoughts on entering Lundborg's plane were not of rescue, but of a good hot bath. Amundsen helps Nobile find peace by reminding him that his frailty is only a sign of humanity and not guilt.

== Cast ==
- Peter Finch as Gen. Umberto Nobile
- Sean Connery as Dr. Roald Amundsen
- Claudia Cardinale as Nurse Valeria
- Hardy Krüger as Lt. Einar Lundborg
- Massimo Girotti as Capt. Romagna, rescue mission coordinator
- Otar Koberidze as Cecioni
- Luigi Vannucchi as Capt. Zappi
- Mario Adorf as Sgt. Biagi, radio operator
- Eduard Martsevich as Dr. Finn Malmgren, meteorologist officer
  (dubbed by Robert Rietty in the international version)
- Grigori Gai as Prof. Rudolf Samoilovich, Chief of the Russian rescue expedition
  (dubbed by David de Keyser in the international version)
- Nikita Mikhalkov as Boris Chukhnovsky, Russian aviator
- Nikolai Ivanov as Kolka Schmidt, Russian radio amateur
- Boris Khmelnitsky as Viglieri
- Yury Solomin as Trojani
- Yuri Vizbor as František Běhounek
- Donatas Banionis as Adalberto Mariano

== Production ==
The film was made with the approval of Nobile. Nobile said of Finch's casting, "I don't know if he looks like me. But if he reads my books and gets into the spirit of the thing, I'm sure he'll give a splendid interpretation."

USSR provided 60% of the budget, Italy (via producer Franco Cristaldi) 40%. Paul Maslansky was in charge of production for the Italian producer Franco Cristaldi.

Filming started in February 1968 and went for 62 weeks. It included location work in the Estonian Soviet Socialist Republic, the Baltic Sea and the Svalbard Archipelago in the Arctic Ocean, and studio work in Moscow and Rome.

Fernando Ghia, who worked on the film, recalled "There was an Italian screenplay, a Russian screenplay and an English screenplay. The Russians wanted to go one way, we wanted to go another and there was a lot of trouble." He claimed, "When you were dealing with the Russians, the actors and technicians were paid by the State and when they were shooting they were paid a bonus, so they shot for ever."

The Russians planned a film that went for four hours but Americans wanted a shorter movie. Half way through the film it was decided to find someone to write new linking scenes for a shorter movie. Robert Bolt was then working in Italy with David Lean on what would become Ryan's Daughter when approached to see if he was interested in working on The Red Tent. Bolt agreed to do it during a 5-week break for a fee of $75,000. Ghia says it was Bolt who came up with the character of Amundsen and attracted the interest of Sean Connery. Connery's casting was announced in February 1969.

Sean Connery was paid $1 million and given top billing even though he was only on screen for 10 minutes. His role was filmed in Russia starting in late March and took three weeks.

Shooting was completed on 12 April 1969. Paramount picked up the US distribution rights. It was one of a number of "international" films starring Claudia Cardinale.

The international version of the film features original music by Ennio Morricone, with Dino Asciolla as viola soloist and Bruno Nicolai as the conductor.

== Reception ==
=== Critical response ===
On the review aggregator website Rotten Tomatoes, 89% of 9 critics' reviews are positive, with an average rating of 7.6/10. Metacritic, which uses a weighted average, assigned the film a score of 64 out of 100, based on 5 critics, indicating "generally favorable" reviews.

=== Awards ===
The film was nominated for 1972 Golden Globe Award for Best English-Language Foreign Film.

== Notes ==
- Turner, Adrian (1998). Robert Bolt: Scenes from Two Lives. Hutchinson. ISBN 9780099736516.
