= The Red Tent =

The Red Tent or Red Tent may refer to:

- Red Tent (shelter), a tent used by survivors of the airship Italia in 1928
- The Red Tent (Nagibin novel), 1960
  - The Red Tent (film), a 1969 Russian-Italian film based on Nagibin's novel
- The Red Tent (Diamant novel), 1997
  - The Red Tent (miniseries), a 2014 miniseries based on Diamant's novel
