= Italia (airship) =

Semi-rigid airship

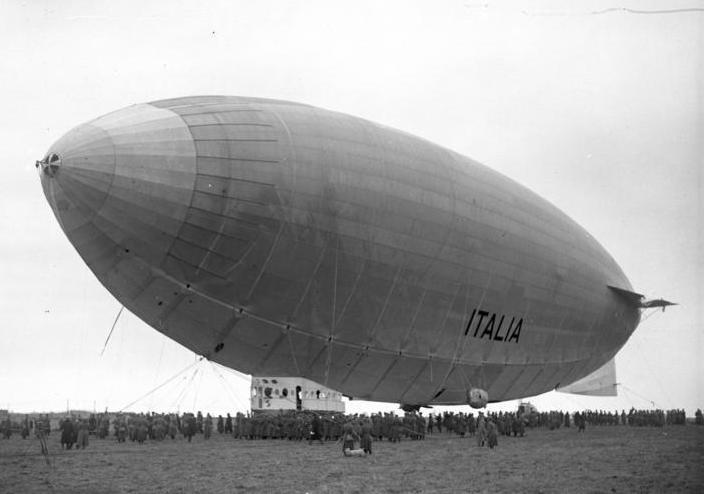
- Italia in April 1928

General information
- Type: N-class semi-rigid airship
- Manufacturer: Stabilimento Costruzioni Aeronautiche-Ministry of Italian Air Force
- Owners: Italian Geographical Society
- Construction number: N-4

History
- Manufactured: 1925–1927
- First flight: 15 April 1928
- Last flight: 23–25 May 1928
- Fate: Crashed

Italia was a semi-rigid airship belonging to the Italian Air Force and designed by Italian engineer Umberto Nobile who commanded the dirigible in his second series of flights around the North Pole. Returning from the pole in May 1928, Italia crashed with one confirmed death, another death from exposure while awaiting rescue, and six missing crew members who were trapped in the envelope, which was blown away. At the end of the rescue operations there were seventeen dead (crew and rescuers) and eight survivors, including Nobile.

== Design and specifications ==
Italia was an N-class semi-rigid airship, designation N-4. It was almost identical in design to the N-1 Norge but was slightly larger in gas capacity.

- First flight: 1928
- Length: 106.0 metres (347.8 ft)
- Diameter: 19.5 metres (63.9 ft)
- Gas capacity: 18,500 cubic metres (654,000 cu ft)
- Performance: 113.0 kilometres per hour (70.2 mph)
- Payload: 9,500 kilograms (20,900 lb)
- Power plant: 3 Maybach diesel engines, 560 kilowatts (750 hp) total

== Polar expedition ==
At the end of 1927, after much insistence, Nobile gained permission to use this airship for a new scientific expedition to the North Pole under the aegis of the Italian Geographical Society. He obtained strong assistance from the Italian Royal Navy and secured the necessary funds from a private financing Committee of the City of Milan.

=== Personnel ===
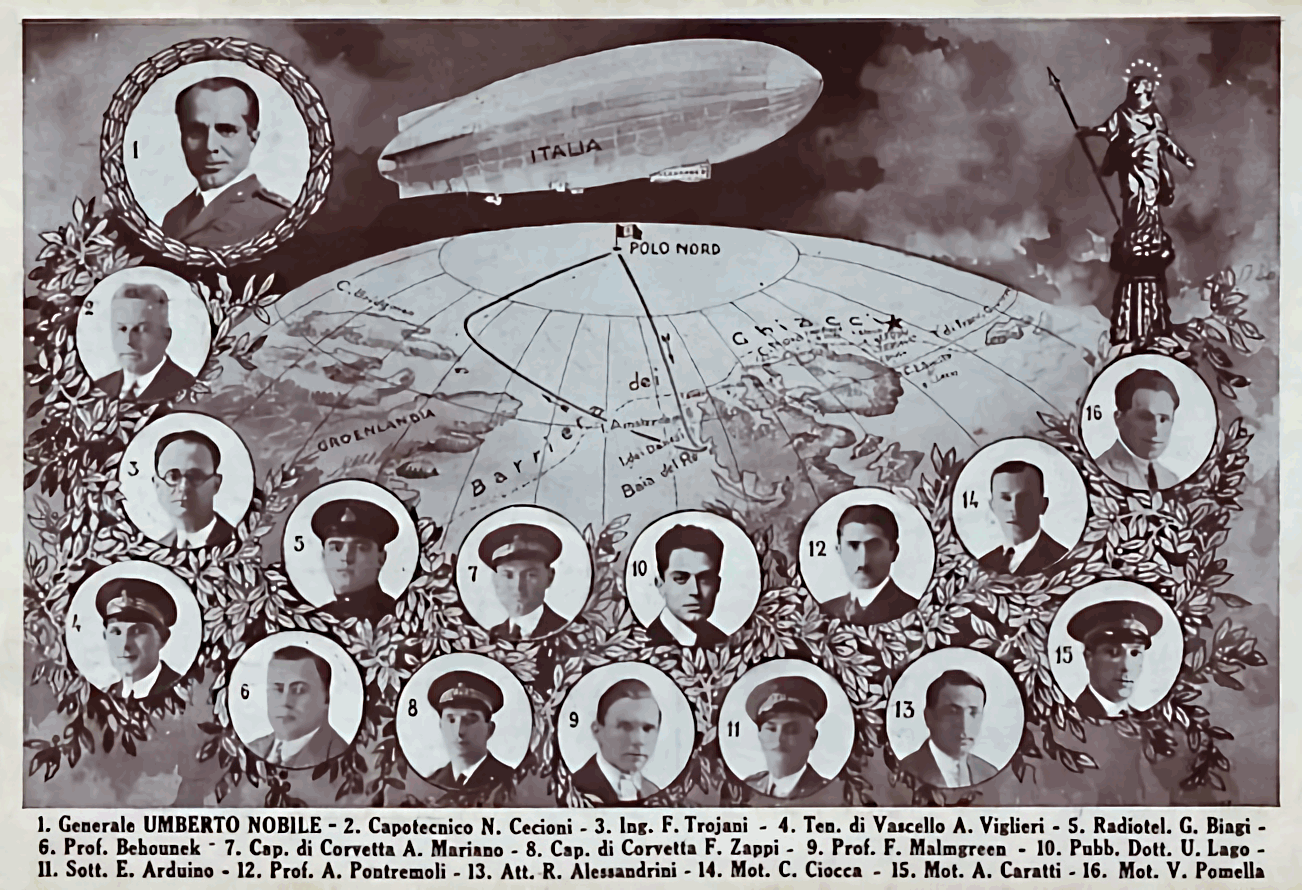
List of the 'Italia' aircrew on the final voyage in 1928.

- Umberto Nobile, expedition leader – survived
- Titina, Fox Terrier, the expedition's mascot – survived
- Finn Malmgren, Swedish meteorologist, physicist – died trekking for help
- František Běhounek, Czechoslovak physicist – survived
- Aldo Pontremoli, physicist – disappeared with envelope
- Ugo Lago, journalist – disappeared with envelope
- Francesco Tomaselli, journalist – not on final flight
- Adalberto Mariano (RM), navigator – survived
- Filippo Zappi (RM), navigator – survived
- Alfredo Viglieri (RM), navigator, hydrographer – survived
- Natale Cecioni, elevator operator, chief technician – survived
- Giuseppe Biagi, radio operator – survived
- Ettore Pedretti, radio operator – not on final flight
- Felice Trojani, elevator operator, aeronautical project engineer – survived
- Ettore Arduino, chief engine mechanic – disappeared with envelope
- Calisto Ciocca, starboard engine mechanic – disappeared with envelope
- Attilio Caratti, port engine mechanic – disappeared with envelope
- Vincenzo Pomella, rear engine mechanic – killed in the crash
- Renato Alessandrini, foreman, rigger, helmsman – disappeared with envelope

=== Milan–Ny-Ålesund ===
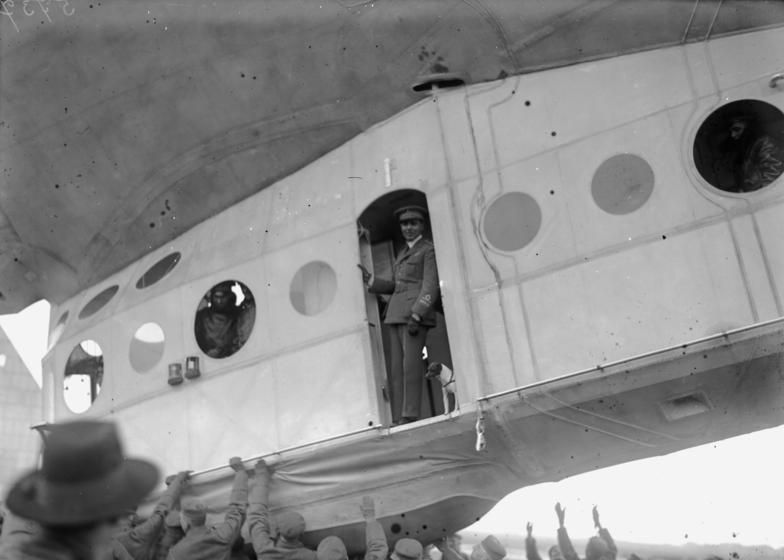
Nobile and Italia at Stolp, Pomerania, in April 1928, before embarking on the polar flights

At 01:15 on 15 April 1928, Italia took off from the base at Milan and headed for the Arctic. With 20 personnel on board, and a payload of 17,000 pounds (7,700 kg) of fuel and supplies, the initial journey to Stolp in Germany took 30 hours through a variety of bad weather conditions. Near Trieste, a wind gust damaged one of the tail fins. Later, in the Sudetes, the airship faced severe hailstorms and narrowly escaped lightning strikes.

On arrival at Stolp in Pomerania, at 07:15 on 16 April, inspection revealed hail damage to the propellers and envelope, and severe tail fin damage. All of the ballast and most of the fuel had been used fighting the wind. Repairs took ten days, and the required parts and technicians had to be sent from Italy.

Takeoff from Stolp was further delayed by bad weather, but Italia set off for Norway at 03:28 on 3 May 1928; eight hours later, escorted by Swedish naval planes, she passed over Stockholm. The expedition's meteorologist, Finn Malmgren, spotted his house from the air and the airship descended to drop a letter to his mother. Bad weather forced Italia east over Finland; she passed over Rovaniemi at 01:49 on 4 May, reaching the mooring mast at Vadsø later that day. While the airship was moored without difficulty, blizzard conditions and heavy rain kept the crew in a state of constant anxiety but caused only minor structural damage.

As soon as the weather permitted, Italia took off for Ny-Ålesund (Kings Bay) at 20:34 on 5 May, and by 05:30 the following day, had passed the meteorological station on Bear Island, but ran into high winds shortly afterwards, also suffering an engine failure. By 12:00 on 6 May, Italia had reached Kings Bay where the support ship Città di Milano was anchored under the command of Captain Giuseppe Romagna Manoja.

=== Polar flights ===
Nobile planned three polar flights, each exploring a different area of the Arctic, with a return to Kings Bay between flights. Once the necessary engine and structural repairs had been completed, the first flight departed from Kings Bay on 11 May 1928. Italia was forced to turn back eight hours into the flight because of thick ice forming on the envelope, as well as fraying of the control cables due to the extreme conditions.

The second flight left at 13:20 on 15 May and lasted for sixty hours. In contrast to the first flight, the weather conditions were excellent this time and visibility was perfect. Valuable meteorological, magnetic, and geographic data were gathered in a 2,500-mile (4,000 km) flight to the hitherto uncharted Nicholas II Land and back. Malmgren carried out weather and ice observations, while Pontremoli and Běhounek took measurements of magnetic phenomena and radioactivity. The airship returned safely to base at Kings Bay in the early hours of 18 May.

The third flight started on the morning of 23 May; following a route along the Greenland coast, with the assistance of strong tailwinds, Italia reached the North Pole nineteen hours later, at 00:24, on 24 May. Nobile had prepared a winch, an inflatable raft, and survival packs (which turned out to be providential) with the intention of lowering some of the scientists onto the ice, but the wind made this task impossible. Instead, they circled the pole, making observations, and at 01:20, they dropped onto the ice the Italian and Milanese colours, as well as a wooden cross presented by Pope Pius XI and a religious medal from the citizens of Forlì, during a short ceremony. Italia started back to base at 02:20, on 24 May.

=== Crash ===
The same tail wind that had helped Italia to the pole now impeded her progress. Nobile calculated that the return journey would take 40 hours, and had discussed their options with Malmgren in the hours before their arrival at the pole. Nobile considered a trans-polar route to Mackenzie Bay in Canada but, according to Nobile, Malmgren advised a return to Kings Bay, predicting lessening winds on their return trip. On the other hand, Malmgren anticipated a head wind all the way if the Canadian route was attempted. No doubt the prospect of a forced landing in the Canadian wilderness was unpalatable to both men, as it would mean the end of the expedition.

Travelling directly south on a heading for Kings Bay, after 24 hours of increasing head winds and thick mist, Italia was only halfway back to base. The airship struggled to gain ground and break through to the zone of calmer winds which Malmgren predicted was just ahead. Ice forming on the propellers was breaking off and tearing holes in the envelope which necessitated constant repairs. Engine speed was increased but with little effect, except for a doubling of fuel consumption. Dr Běhounek, who was in charge of the compass, started to report variations in course of up to 30 degrees, and the elevator man Cecioni had similar problems maintaining control. By 07:30 on 25 May, Nobile had been awake for well over 48 hours and knew that the situation was critical. Giuseppe Biagi, the wireless operator, sent a message stating if he did not answer a call, there would be a good reason.

By dead reckoning, Nobile estimated the airship's position to be 100 miles (160 km) northeast of Moffen Island; instead they were 200 miles (320 km) east of the island.

The first critical incident occurred at 09:25, on 25 May, when the elevator control jammed in the downward position while the ship was travelling at less than 1,000 feet (300 metres) altitude. All engines were stopped, and Italia began to rise again after it had dropped to within 300 feet (91 metres) of the jagged ice pack. The airship was allowed to continue rising to 3,000 feet (910 metres) and above the cloud layer into bright sunlight for 30 minutes. After two engines were restarted, the ship descended to 1,000 feet (300 metres) with no apparent ill effect, with the headwind appearing to decrease slightly allowing an airspeed of 30 mph. Malmgren took the helm with Zappi supervising him, and Cecioni continued to operate the elevators.

At 10:25, the ship was noticed to be tail-heavy and falling at a rate of 2 feet per second (0.61 m/s). Nobile ordered full elevators and emergency power, but although the nose rose to an upward angle of 21 degrees, the descent continued. Nobile ordered foreman rigger Renato Alessandrini to the tail of the envelope to check the automatic gas valves. Shortly afterwards, realising that a crash was unavoidable, Nobile ordered the engines at full stop and the cutting of electrical power to prevent a fire on impact; however, the port engine engineer failed to notice the order, and the ship began to bank. At the same time, Nobile ordered Cecioni to dump the ballast chain, but he was unable to carry out the order in time, owing to the steep angle of the floor and the secure way in which the chain was lashed. Seconds later, the airship's control car hit the jagged ice, smashed open and was torn from the keel. Suddenly relieved of the weight of the gondola, the envelope of the ship began to rise, with a gaping tear in the keel and part of one cabin wall still attached.

Nine survivors and one dead crewman were stranded on the ice. Six more crew were trapped in the still-drifting airship envelope which, along with the crew members on board, has never been found. The position of the crash was close to 81°14′N 28°14′E, approximately 120 km (75 mi) northeast of Nordaustlandet, Svalbard. The drifting sea ice later took the survivors towards Foyn and Broch islands.

==== Immediate aftermath ====
Cecioni was hurled out of the ruptured cabin into a mound of ice, injuring both of his legs. He would later recall that he saw the envelope drifting above him, and Ciocca halfway out of the starboard engine car staring down in horror. Lago, Dr Pontremoli, and Alessandrini could also be seen in the torn opening where the companionway had been. Chief engine mechanic Ettore Arduino, with remarkable presence of mind, started throwing anything he could lay his hands on down to the men on the ice as he drifted slowly away with the envelope. These supplies, and the packs intended for the descent to the ice, helped to keep the survivors alive for their long ordeal. Arduino, and the five others, are assumed to have perished with the drifting airship envelope.

Trojani, at the engine control signals, fared better, as he was hurled into soft snow and rolled before immediately jumping to his feet and cleaning the snow off his glasses, which had survived the crash unscathed. Viglieri and Mariano, standing next to the chart table, briefly saw the rear engine car about to strike the ice hard and then found themselves prostrate, but unharmed, in a mass of debris. Biagi, with no time to send out an SOS, grabbed the portable emergency radio and wrapped his arms around it, trying to save it from damage. The impact on the ice had winded him, but he was still inside the wreck of the cabin when it came to rest. Nobile lay unconscious with a head wound, with Malmgren and Zappi nearby. Mariano, Běhounek, Trojani, and Viglieri were the first to rise to their feet, and they began to examine the others for injuries. Nobile gradually regained consciousness; he had a broken leg, right arm, and cracked rib, in addition to the head wound. Cecioni had two badly broken legs. Malmgren had an injured (broken or dislocated) shoulder and was suspected, much later on, to have internal injuries. Zappi had severe chest pains from suspected broken ribs.

Almost immediately, the survivors were buoyed by the discovery of a waterproof bag containing chocolate, pemmican, a Colt revolver, ammunition and a flare gun. Biagi's shortwave radio was intact and he began searching for material to construct a radio mast. He soon discovered the rear engine car smashed on the ice, and the body of Pomella, who appeared to have survived the impact and sat down on a block of ice, only to die shortly afterwards from a head injury. Despite this shock, Biagi was able to erect an antenna, and within a few hours began to send the first SOS signals from the stricken survivors. Nobile and Cecioni were placed together in a sleeping bag for warmth and spent the next few hours in semi-consciousness, while the others gathered what they could from the wreck. According to Nobile, Malmgren, who was in immense pain and suffering from guilt about his role in the crash, announced that he would drown himself and began to walk away from the crash site, but he stopped when Nobile sharply ordered him to return. Later the same day, Mariano had to subdue and disarm Malmgren when he found him walking away from the crash site with the loaded Colt revolver. Meanwhile, the uninjured men surveyed the ice pack, collecting supplies, and they chose a stable patch of ice to erect a 2.4 by 2.4 metres (8 ft × 8 ft) silk tent that they had recovered; this was to be their only shelter during the coming ordeal.

The day after the crash was spent looking for more supplies amongst the wreckage. Navigational instruments and charts were recovered, allowing them to calculate the approximate position of the crash site. They also calculated the quantity of rations per man: a scant 300 grams (11 oz) of food per day, mainly pemmican and chocolate, calculated for a 25-day stretch on the ice. Eventually 129 kilograms (284 lb) of food were recovered, extending the supply to 45 days. Finally, the crowded tent was dyed with red strips for improved visibility from the air, using dye marker bombs that had been on board the airship. Biagi continued to regularly signal for help with his radio, but the connection with the support ship Città di Milano was long impeded due to the precarious conditions of operation of the field radio, the particular propagation of short waves, and the unscrupulous use of radio stations by journalists at the Italian base in Ny-Ålesund. The men had been equipped with many layers of woollen clothes and lambskin flight suits, but not all of them were fully dressed at the time of the crash and none had proper Arctic survival clothing. Land was sighted in the distance on 28 May, breaking the despondency of the survivors. Discussions began as to whether they should attempt a trek towards land and eventually it was decided that Malmgren, Zappi and Mariano would set off to try to summon help. On 29 May, Malmgren shot a curious polar bear that had wandered to the crash site, augmenting the food supply with about 180 kilograms (400 lb) of fresh meat.

==== Rescue effort ====
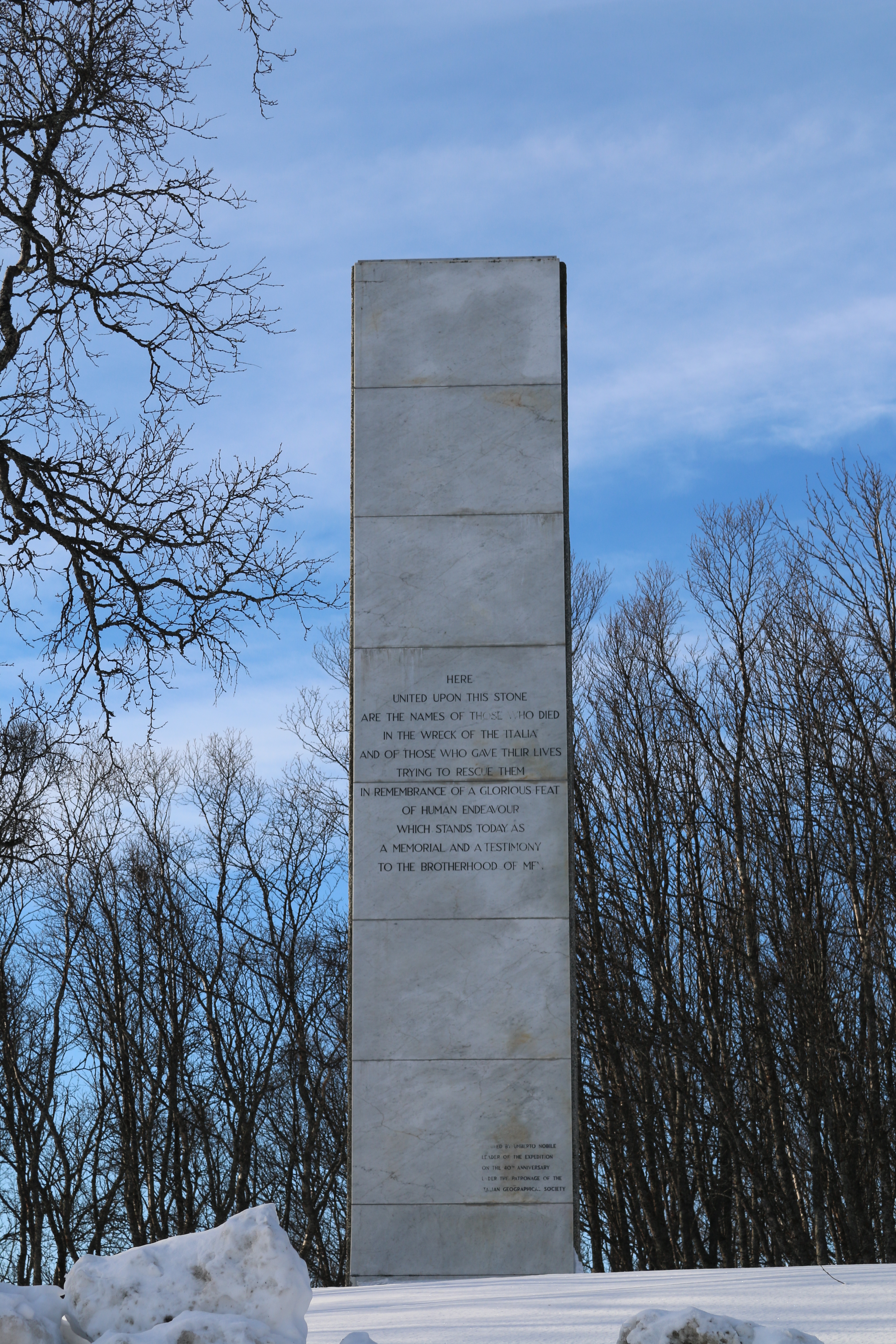
Nobile monument in Tromsø, dedicated to the people who died in the crash and subsequent rescue efforts

On 25 May, Captain Romagna Manoja immediately asked for Norway's assistance through the Italian delegation at Oslo. He rented two whaling boats and embarked on a rescue cruise to the northeast coasts. An international rescue effort followed. Word also reached Norwegian polar explorer Roald Amundsen in Oslo, who immediately began to organize a search; American Lincoln Ellsworth, who had accompanied Amundsen and Nobile on the earlier polar flight, also offered to aid in the search.

In Italy, Arturo Mercanti, a former air force chief and friend of Nobile, requested that air force planes be sent to the Arctic to begin a search. The Italian Government authorised three sea planes to be used: a Dornier Wal, piloted by Luigi Penzo; another Wal, piloted by Ivo Ravazzoni; and a Savoia-Marchetti S.55, piloted by Lieutenant Colonel Umberto Maddalena, who was the first rescuer to spot the "Red Tent" survivors on 20 June.

Captain Gennaro Sora (of the Italian Army Alpini ski detachment) ran a heroic over-ice sled attempt from the Città di Milano support ship, while Matteoda and Albertini of the SUCAI (the University Section of the Italian Alpine Club) did the same from the Italian-hired ship Braganza.

The lack of co-ordination among the search efforts meant that it took more than 48 days before all of the crash survivors (and the stranded would-be rescuers) were retrieved. Roald Amundsen was lost and presumed dead after the French Latham sea plane piloted by René Guilbaud, in which he was flying to join the rescue operation, disappeared en route to Spitsbergen.

===== Chronology of Crash =====
Italia crashed on the ice on 25 May 1928. These are the events that followed:

- 25 May: Radio operator Biagi salvages the radio, constructs a makeshift radio mast and begins transmitting SOS. Captain of the support ship Città di Milano, Giuseppe Romagna Manoja, calls Norway for help through the Italian diplomatic delegation of Oslo.
- 26 May: At the request of Captain Romagna, the Norwegian whaler Hobby is hired by the Italian government.
- 27–30 May: The ship City of Milan makes a rescue cruise to the North Cape, but is forced to turn back due to the impossibility of tackling the pack ice, but Sucaini Gianni Albertini and Sergio Matteoda manage to land, with the guide Valdemar Kramer, and the Alpini Giuseppe Sandrini and Silvio Pedrotti, who start the search with dogs and sleds.
- 28 May: Captain Romagna also hires the Norwegian whaler Braganza.
- 29 May: The second radio telegraphist of the expedition, Ettore Pedretti, on board City of Milan intercepts a fragment of message which may have been transmitted by Biagi, but not being certain he does not transcribe the message, which only later proves to be a genuine transmission.
- 30 May: The survivors are unable to establish radio contact because of weather conditions, the particular propagation of short waves and the unscrupulous use of the radio frequencies by journalists based in Ny-Ålesund. Malmgren, with navigators Mariano and Zappi, begin a trek toward land to seek help.
- 3 June: Nikolai Schmidt, a 21-year-old Soviet amateur radio operator in Vokhma, hears Italia SOS signals with his home-made lamp-regenerative circuit; he immediately sends a telegram to Radio Friends Company in Moscow; in Osoaviakhim aid committee "Italia" is established
- 5 June: The Norwegian pilot Finn Lützow-Holm makes the first flight in search of Italia. In the ensuing weeks, pilots from Norway, Sweden, Finland, the Soviet Union and Italy make search and rescue flights.
- 9 June: Radio contact is established between the survivors and Città di Milano. The ship, under the command of Captain Ugo Baccarani, intercepts the coordinates of the survivors and the search takes effect.
- 12 June: Icebreaker Malygin heads from Arkhangelsk towards Svalbard.
- 16 June: Icebreaker Krasin equipped with one Junkers YuG-1 on board (Boris Chukhnovsky as a pilot) under the command of Rudolf Samoylovich heads for the rescue from Saint Petersburg.
- 15–16 June: Malmgren collapses from exposure on the ice and asks to be left behind. His body has never been found.
- 18 June: Roald Amundsen and five others disappear on a flight to Spitsbergen to aid in the rescue operations. Captain Gennaro Sora of the Italian Alpini defies orders and sets off by sled with Arctic explorers Ludvig Varming and Sjef van Dongen to try to reach the crash zone.
- 20 June: Icebreaker Malygin was caught in ice in Barents Sea and out of rescue mission.
- 20 June: Italian pilot Maddalena spots the survivors and drops supplies, many of which are smashed or useless.
- 21 June: Krasin landed in Bergen
- 22 June: Italian and Swedish pilots drop more supplies, this time successfully.
- 23 June: Krasin headed towards Svalbard.
- 23 June: Swedish pilot Einar Lundborg is ordered to rescue Nobile first, but crashes his plane when he returns for more survivors and is trapped on the ice with the others. Rescue operations are suspended pending the arrival of suitable light aircraft capable of landing on the ice.
- 6 July: Lundborg is picked up from the ice floe by his Swedish co-pilot Birger Schyberg in a light Cirrus Moth ski-biplane. Schyberg also intends to rescue the other five survivors (including Nobile's dog), but changing ice conditions lead him to change his mind after having brought Lundborg to safety.
- 10 July: Chukhnovsky's crew flew out to conduct ice reconnaissance and search for the Italian camp. Malmgren's group was seen but it was unable to count how many people was there. The radiogram sent to the Krasin indicated three survivors. Due to fog Chukhnovsky couldn't find an icebreaker and forced landed on ice floe. Landing gear and two propellers were damaged. Chukhnovsky radioed that he doesn't need any help and rescue effort should be directed towards the Italians.
- 12 July: Krasin rescues Mariano and Zappi, but Malmgren has already been left behind almost four weeks prior. The five remaining Italia survivors are rescued by the icebreaker later the same day. Boris Chukhnovsky and his four crew are also rescued by Krasin on its way back to Kings Bay.
- 13 July: Rescuers Sora and Van Dongen are rescued from Foynøya island by Finnish and Swedish aircraft.

===== Participants in search of Italia survivors =====
Denmark
State owned Arctic schooner Gustav Holm from Kgl. Grønlandske Handel.
Finland
Floatplane / ski aircraft Junkers F 13 Turku K-SALG (from Aero OY / Finnair), commander Olavi Sarko, pilot Gunnar Lihr.
France
Flying boat biplane Latham 47 "02" (from French Navy) pilot: René Guilbaud.
Two small flying boats, Hydravions Louis Schreck FBA type biplane (on board Strasbourg).
Cruiser Strasbourg, oil supply vessel Durance, fishery inspection vessel Quentin Roosevelt and private expedition vessel Pourquoi-Pas.
Italy
Flying boat Savoia-Marchetti S.55 I-SAAT Santa Maria (from Italian Air Force) pilot: Maddalena.
Flying boat Do15 Dornier Wal Marina II I-PLIF (from Italian Air Force) pilot: Penzo.
Flying boat Do15 Dornier Wal Marina I I-XAAF (from Italian Air Force) pilot: Ravazzoni. (Marina I was stationed exclusively at Tromsø, Northern Norway searching for Amundsen).
Two small flying boats, Macchi M.18 type biplane stationed at Citta di Milano and Braganza pilots: Penzo and Crosio.
Cableship Citta di Milano and seal fishery vessels Hobby and Braganza.
Norwegian trapper Waldemar Kræmer and four Alpini soldiers with a small boat searched the coast of Vestspitsbergen.
Dog sledge team led by the Italian Alpini captain Sora, the Dutchman van Dongen and the Dane Ludvig Varming searched the coast of Nordaustlandet. Varming was left behind, but Sora and van Dongen reached Foyn Island and Broch island.
Norway
Floatplane monoplane Hansa-Brandenburg W.33 "F.36" pilot: Finn Lützow-Holm.
Floatplane monoplane Hansa-Brandenburg W.33 "F.38" pilot: Riiser-Larsen.
Floatplane biplane Sopwith Baby "F.100" pilot: Lambrecht (on board Tordenskjold).
Floatplane biplane Sopwith Baby "F.102" pilot: Ingebrigtsen (on board Tordenskjold).
Coastal defense ship HNoMS Tordenskjold, and seal fishery vessels Hobby (used thrice, see Italy and USA), Braganza (used twice, see Italy). Veslekari (Tryggve Gran), Heimland, fishery inspection vessel Michael Sars, Svalbard governor's Svalbard and miner's boat (name unknown).
Dog sledge team led by the trapper Hilmar Nøis and Rolf S. Tandberg supported partly by two Italian alpine students Albertini and Matteoda.
Soviet Union
Floatplane / ski monoplane Junkers G 23 Red Bear (on board Krassin) pilot: Boris Chukhnovsky.
Floatplane / ski monoplane Junkers F 13 RR-DAS (on board Malygin) pilot: Babushkin.
Icebreakers Krassin, Malygin, Georgiy Sedov and brig Perseus
Sweden
Floatplane monoplane Hansa Brandenburg (Heinkel HE 5) "255" pilot: Tornberg.
Floatplane monoplane Hansa Brandenburg (Heinkel HE 5) "257" pilot: Jacobsson.
Ski biplane Fokker C.V.M. "31" pilot: Einar Lundborg.
Ski biplane Fokker C.V.M. "32" (never used, in the hold of Tanja).
Floatplane / ski biplane de Havilland 60 Moth S-AABN pilot: Birger Schyberg.
Ski monoplane Klemm-Daimler L.20 D-1357 (from Germany) pilot: Ekman.
Floatplane monoplane Junkers G 24 Uppland S-AABG (from national airline ABA) pilot: Viktor Nilsson.
Seal fishery vessel Quest and freighter S/S Tanja.
United States
Seal fishery vessel Hobby with "F.36" and "F.38" pilots: Lützow-Holm and Riiser-Larsen (Louise Boyd charter).

== Causes of crash ==
After nearly a century, the causes of the crash of Italia remain controversial. The main causes were the severe Arctic climate and the decision to return to base in Spitsbergen in the midst of a worsening gale, rather than to continue across the Pole and attempt a landing in Canada. This fact drove meteorologist Finn Malmgren to attempt suicide twice soon after the crash.

Another factor was the decision to let the airship rise above the cloud layer, causing the expansion of the hydrogen, which triggered automatic valving of the gas. Once the engines were restarted, the dirigible descended through the clouds into freezing air again and, either because the automatic valves were jammed open, or because too much hydrogen had already been valved, the airship was too heavy to remain aloft. Although the Italian fascist government blamed Nobile for the crash and was the victim of a smear campaign in the press, one criticism, from the master zeppelin commander Hugo Eckener is perhaps justified—that Nobile should never have climbed above the cloud layer in the first place.

Another possibility is a rupture of one of the gas cells, although this is unlikely as it almost certainly would have been noticed immediately by any of the crew on duty. The most recent theory suggests that the outer cover of the airship may have sustained damage during the pre-flight ice removal, when a group of men wearing ice cleats hacked at the airship with pickaxes. Felice Trojani, one of the airship engineers, reported in his book that in the years after the crash, he examined eleven different possible causes in detail without coming to any real solution.

Recent analysis of the historical evidence shows that human fatigue probably played an important role in the crash of Italia. At the time of the crash, Nobile may have gone for at least 72 hours, i.e., three days without sleep; just prior to the crash, Nobile made three command errors of types associated with inadequate sleep. Sleep deprivation impairs aspects of cognitive functioning necessary for commanding flights, especially under such challenging conditions. Nobile's failure (or refusal) to choose a second-in-command was the primary reason for his sleep deprivation and may have directly led to the crash of Italia.

In 2019, Bruno Zolesi of the Italian national institute of geophysics and volcanology (INGV) "reconstructed the space weather conditions (i.e. the ionospheric conditions, solar physics and geomagnetism) at the time of the shipwreck, to attempt to explain the problems encountered in radio communications." The INGV states that Italia's 9.4 MHz SOS signals "could not, even in undisturbed ionospheric conditions, be heard from the support vessel Città di Milan." Further analysis of geomagnetic data close to the polar region points to a geomagnetic storm in progress at the time of the crash.

== Search for wreckage ==
The latest documented, targeted attempt to locate the wreckage of Italia was carried out in 2018, ninety years after the crash. On 13 August 2018, a team of researchers with the PolarQuest2018 expedition reached the GPS coordinates of the first SOS message radioed by Giuseppe Biagi from the Red Tent and were aided by the fact that global climate change has greatly reduced the area of the North Atlantic Ocean that is typically covered by ice. After a short commemoration ceremony, the team on board deployed an innovative 3D multi-beam sonar device to search the seabed for any potential wreckage of Italia (the same technology has successfully located other wreckage such as that of USS Susan B. Anthony, which sank off the coast of France in 1944). They scanned along the most probable search areas for the missing airship envelope, following the drift of the Red Tent. The search, however, produced no results. As of 2025, no trace of Italia and her crew have been found.

== Popular culture ==
- The 1928 Soviet documentary film Heroic Deed Among the Ice, by Georgi Vasilyev and Sergei Vasilyev, describes the rescue mission of the Soviet icebreaker Krassin.
- František Běhounek, one of the survivors, wrote several books depicting the events, including Trosečníci na kře ledové (translation: Survivors on cold ice) (1928). He was also advisor for the 1968 Czechoslovak documentary film, Vzducholodí k severnímu pólu (translation: Airship to the Northern Pole).
- The story of the Italia disaster was made into a film in 1969, titled The Red Tent, starring Peter Finch as Nobile and Sean Connery as Roald Amundsen.
- Midnight Sun is a 2007 graphic novel by Ben Towle, which tells a semi-fictionalised account of the rescue mission.
- The Spitsbergen Airship Museum in Longyearbyen, Svalbard, features many objects from Italia, and attempts to portray the events of the expedition and subsequent rescue efforts in a neutral tone.
- In Saul Bellow's novel Humboldt's Gift, the Italia airship rescue mission inspires Von Humboldt Fleisher's gift, a movie treatment.

== See also ==
- List of airship accidents
