= Kolosovykh Island =

Island in the Kara Sea

Native name: остров Колосовых
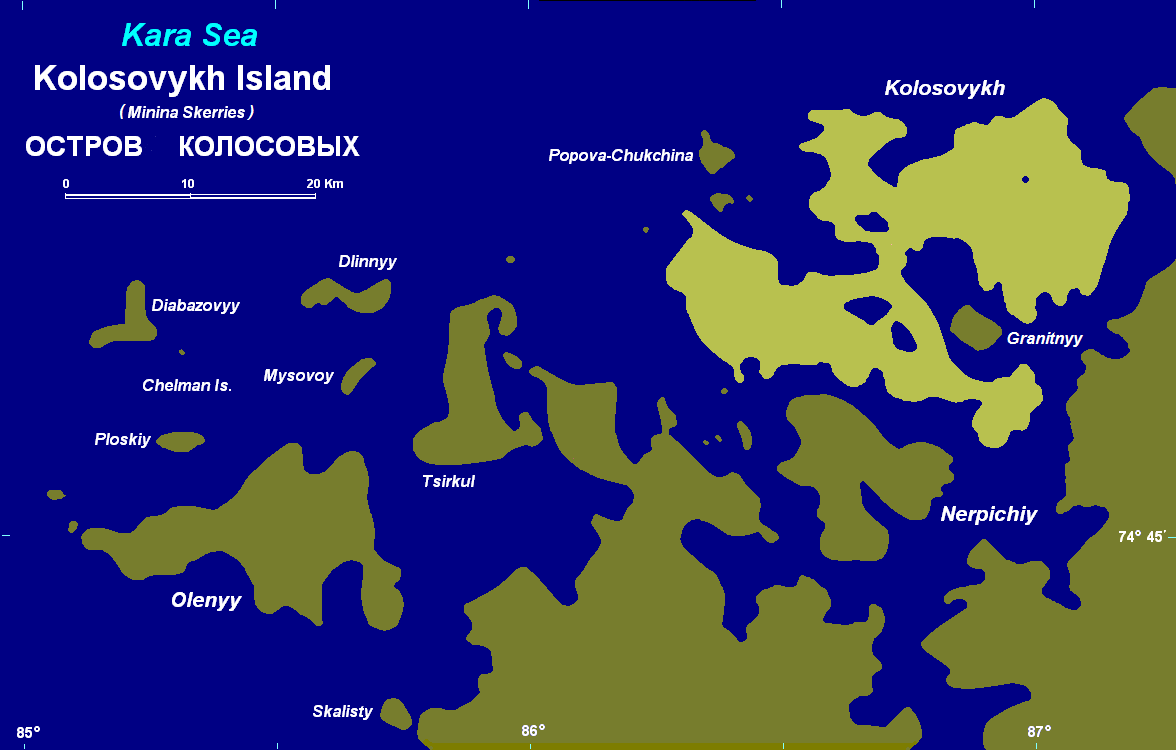

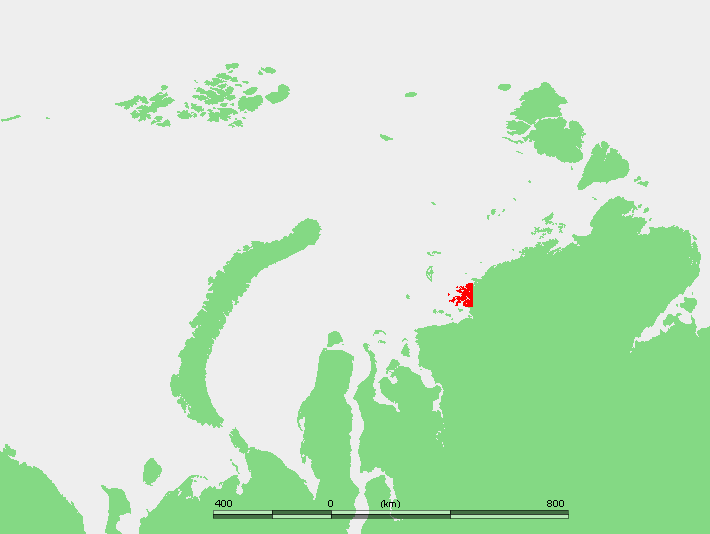
- Location of the Minina Skerries. Kolosovykh Island is in the northern part of the skerries.

Geography
- Location: Kara Sea
- Coordinates: 74°50′N 86°15′E
- Length: 28 km (17.4 mi)
- Width: 9 km (5.6 mi)
- Highest elevation: 85 m (279 ft)
- Highest point: Gora Kolosovykh

Administration
- Russia
- Krai: Krasnoyarsk Krai
- Raion: Taymyrsky Dolgano-Nenetsky District

Demographics
- Population: uninhabited

Kolosovykh Island (Russian: остров Колосовых; Ostrov Kolosovykh) is an island, in the Kara Sea off the coast of Siberia.

== Geography ==
Kolosovykh Island is located north of the Kolosovykh Peninsula, which is almost an island itself. The island's shore is deeply indented with two deep bays on both sides of a narrow 1.2 km wide isthmus that joins the northern from the southern part of the island. Ostrov Bol'shoy, a fairly large island with a diameter of 3 km, is located in the eastern bay. Kolosovykh has an average height of 13 m above sea level. and is separated from the mainland by a 2 km wide sound. Geologically Kolosovykh Island is part of the Minina Skerries a coastal archipelago forming a complex structure that includes the Plavnikovyye Islands further south.

The highest point of the island is 85 m high Gora Kolosovykh Hill. The sea surrounding Kolosovykh Island is covered with fast ice in the winter and the climate is severe, with bitter and long winters. The waters off the shores are often obstructed by pack ice even in the summer.

This island belongs to the Krasnoyarsk Krai administrative division of Russia and is part of the Great Arctic State Nature Reserve, the largest nature reserve of the Russian Federation.

=== Adjacent islands ===
- Ostrov Bol'shoy (Big Island), a fairly large island with a diameter of 3 km, located in the eastern bay at (74°51′N 86°51′E).
- Popova-Chukchina Island, located at the western end of the western bay north of Kolosovykh Island's westernmost point at (74°56′N 86°19′E).

== History ==
In 1937 the Arctic Institute of the USSR organized an expedition to investigate the Northern Sea Route in the Kara Sea. Relics of the ill-fated 1912-13 Vladimir Rusanov’s expedition on ship Gerkules were found on Popova-Chukchina Island located west of Kolosovykh Island.

== See also ==
- List of islands of Russia
- Taymyr Peninsula
