= Giuseppe Biagi =

Giuseppe Biagi may refer to:

- Giuseppe Biagi (painter) (born 1949), Italian painter
- Giuseppe Biagi (explorer) (1897–1965), Italian soldier, explorer and radio operator
