= Eduard Martsevich =

Soviet and Russian actor (1936–2013)

- Born: Eduard Evgenievich Martsevich; December 29, 1936; Tbilisi, Georgian Soviet Socialist Republic, USSR
- Died: October 12, 2013 (aged 76); Moscow, Russia
- Occupations: Actor theatre director theatre teacher
- Years active: 1959–2013

Eduard Evgenievich Martsevich (Russian: Эдуард Евгеньевич Марцевич; December 29, 1936, Tbilisi – October 12, 2013, Moscow) was a Soviet and Russian film and theater actor. People's Artist of the RSFSR.

== Biography ==
=== Career ===
He graduated from the Mikhail Schepkin Higher Theatre School (1959). Since 1959 – an actor Mayakovsky Theatre. Since 1969 – an actor Academic Maly Theater of the USSR. .

At the beginning of his artistic path, he tried his hand at directing. For this year, he broke away from the theater and went to the Lithuanian town of Panevezys for famous director Juozas Miltinis trained profession director.

In 1987, Eduard Martsevich awarded the title of People's Artist of the RSFSR. In 2013 the actor has worked in movies and regularly went to the scene of the State Academic Maly Theater.

=== Died ===
From 11 to 30 September 2013 Martsevich was in Botkin Hospital in Moscow, October 1 – in the hospital number 67, and October 2 in serious condition was taken to hospital in an emergency department acute endotoxicosis Sklifosovsky Institute with cirrhosis.

== Filmography ==
- 1958: Fathers and Sons as Arkady Kirsanov
- 1959: Annushka as Vovka
- 1965–1966: War and Peace as Boris Drubetskoi
- 1969: The Red Tent as Finn Malmgren
- 1970: Theft as collector Alexey Burov
- 1971: Antsyali ardzaganqnere as Heini
- 1974: I am Looking for my Destiny as father of Alexander
- 1975: This Alarming Winter as children's doctor Vyacheslav Ogorodnikov
- 1977: Obelisk as Pavel Miklashevich
- 1977: Semeynye obstoyatelstva as Nikodim
- 1979: Starye dolgi as Vadim Gorokhovskiy
- 1980: Karl Marx. Young Years (TV Series) as Heinrich Heine
- 1980: Bread, Gold, Nagan as gang leader Arkady Nikolaevich Mezentsev
- 1980: Ippodrom as Turin
- 1981: Young Russia as Franz Lefort
- 1981: The Woman in White as Sir Percival Glyde
- 1981: An Ideal Husband as Lord Arthur Goring
- 1982: The Star and Death of Joaquin Murieta as Organ-Grinder
- 1984: TASS Is Authorized to Declare... (TV Mini-Series) as Dmitry Stepanov, a Soviet journalist
- 1984: Lets the Charms Last Long as writer
- 1986: Strange Case of Dr Jekyll and Mr Hyde as Nevile
- 1991: In the USSR as Boris Fydorovich, music teacher
- 1991: Red Island as theater director / cardinal
- 1993: The Bee as counterfeiter recidivist
- 1994: Maestro Thief as Pyotr Khlynov
- 2003: A Morning They Woke Up as Professor
- 2005: The Last Guardian as Kostyrev
- 2007: Anna Karenina (TV Mini-Series) as Prince Shtcherbatsky
- 2010: Ivanov as Grigory Shabelski, Uncle Ivanov
- 2011: Split (TV Series) as Patriarch Joseph of Moscow (uncredited) (final appearance)

== Awards ==
- Honored Artist of the RSFSR (1974)
- People's Artist of the RSFSR (1987)
- Order For Services to the Fatherland IV degree (3 September 2006) for outstanding contribution to the development of domestic theatrical art and many years of fruitful activity
- Order of Friendship (1997)
- Medal in Commemoration of the 850th Anniversary of Moscow

== Family ==
- Father – Evgeny Mikhailovich Martsevich (1911–1974). Mother – Nina Alekseevna Sarankina (1914–1980).
- Wife – Liliya (born 1952)
- Sons:
  - Kirill (born 1974), Chairman of the Council of young professionals theaters in Moscow, the deputy director of the theater under the direction of Dzhigarkhanyan
  - Philipp (born 1980), film and theater actor
