= Renato Alessandrini =

Italian explorer

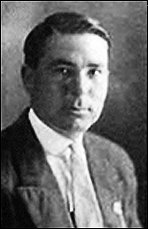
Renato Alessandrini

Renato Alessandrini (August 11, 1890 - May 25, 1928) was an Italian explorer who perished during the polar expedition of the airship Italia.

== Biographical notes ==
Alessandrini was born in Rome. From 1914 he worked as rigger at the Stabilimento Costruzioni Aeronautiche, an aircraft factory of the Italian Army Engineers in Rome. Then, after the World War I, he worked at the airport of Ciampino where Italian military airships were assembled and equipped.

== North Pole ==
Alessandrini participated as rigger and helmsman to the first two historic airship flights to the North Pole, being part of the crew of the Norge ("Amundsen–Ellsworth–Nobile Transpolar Flight") which was the first airship to fly over the North Pole on May 12, 1926, and the first aircraft to fly over the polar ice cap between Europe and America, and also of the Italia, which made three flights over unexplored arctic regions and flew over the pole on May 24, 1928.

The date of Alessandrini's death is not known with certainty; he was lost on May 25, 1928, when the Italia crashed on the Arctic ice during its flight back from the North Pole.

== Honors ==
=== Italian Honors ===
In 1924 Alessandrini had a formal commendation and was decorated with the Silver Medal of the Aero Club of Italy for having, on 18 April 1924, returned the aircraft N-1 to landing after that a gust of wind had torn it from the mooring at Ciampino and dragged it away.

=== Norwegian Honors ===
On October 7, 1926, the King of Norway Haakon VII granted to Alessandrini the Cross of Knight of the Order of St. Olav, as a participant in the expedition of the airship Norge.
