= Midnight Sun (graphic novel) =

Graphic novel by Ben Towle

- Midnight Sun Cover
- Author: Ben Towle
- Illustrator: Ben Towle
- Language: English
- Subject: Arctic exploration
- Publisher: Slave Labor Graphics
- Publication date: December 2007
- Publication place: United States
- Media type: Print (paperback)
- Pages: 139
- ISBN: 978-1-59362-088-2

Midnight Sun is a graphic novel written and drawn by Ben Towle. It is a semi-fictionalized account of the rescue of the Airship Italia in 1928.

Midnight Sun was originally meant to be a six-part comic book series, but only issues 1-3 came out before SLG decided to publish the entire story in a graphic novel format.
