= Mikhailov Peninsula =

Peninsula in the eastern shores of the Kara Sea

Coordinates: 75°05′00″N 87°15′00″E

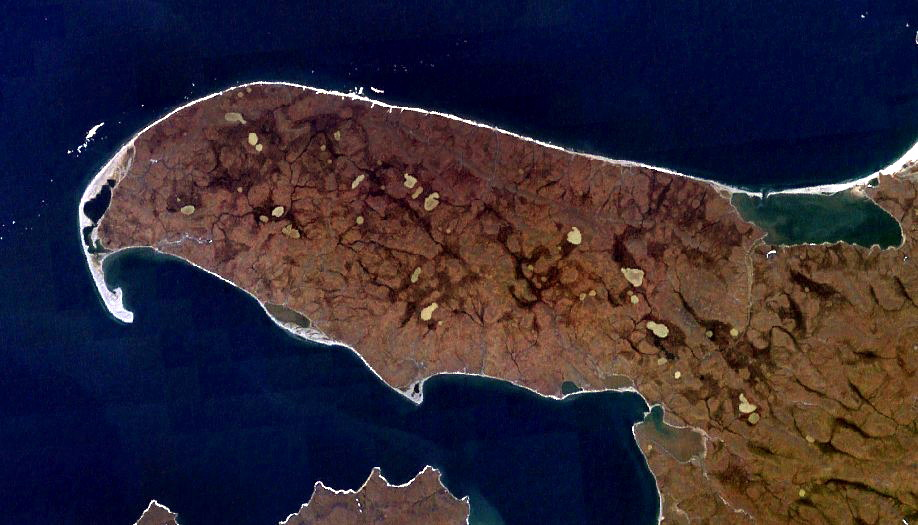
NASA picture of the Mikhailov Peninsula.

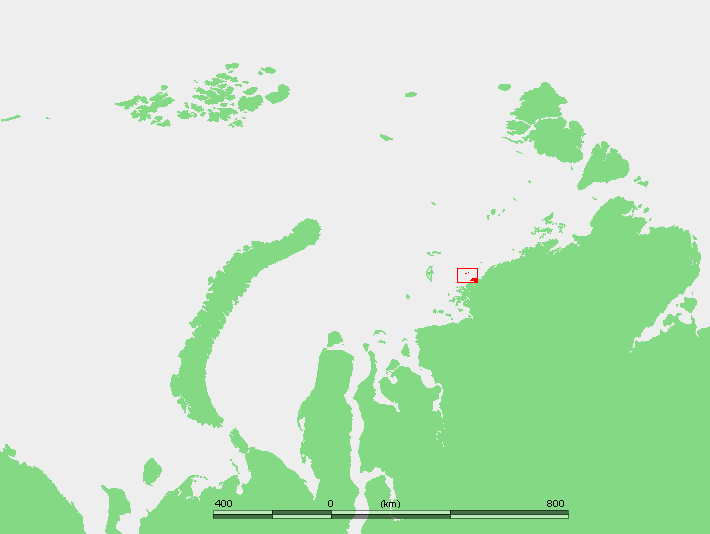
Location of the Mikhailov Peninsula in the Kara Sea coast.

The Mikhailov Peninsula (Russian Poluostrov Mikhailova) is a small peninsula in the eastern shores of the Kara Sea on the western side of the Taymyr Peninsula. Its latitude is 75° 05' N and its longitude 87° 15' E.

The Mikhailov Peninsula is covered with tundra and it lies north of the Minina Skerries. It belongs to the Krasnoyarsk Krai administrative division of the Russian Federation. It is also part of the Great Arctic State Nature Reserve, the largest nature reserve of Russia.

The climate in the area is cold with long bitter winters. The sea surrounding the Mikhailov Peninsula is frozen most of the year. It begins to thaw towards mid June and already by mid September it freezes again.

== History ==
In 1921, a Soviet-Norwegian expedition led by Nikifor Begichev looking for Roald Amundsen's men Peter Tessem and Paul Knutsen, found the remains of a campfire with charred bones near the Mikhailov Peninsula. These were initially assumed to be the remains of one of the Norwegian men. Recent evidence, however, points out that this campfire had been probably left behind by the ill-fated Rusanov expedition.
