= Plavnikovye Islands =

Islands in the Kara Sea, Russia

Coordinates: 74°10′N 85°15′E

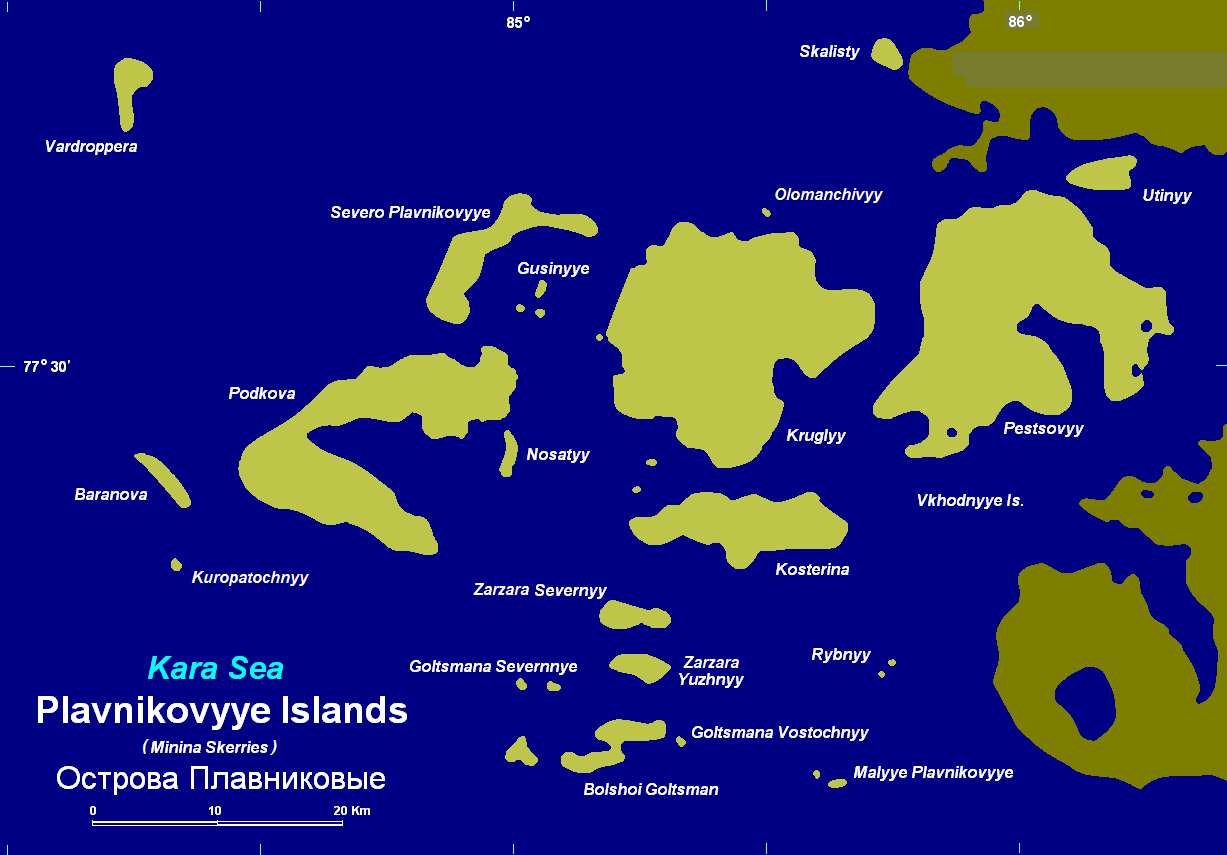

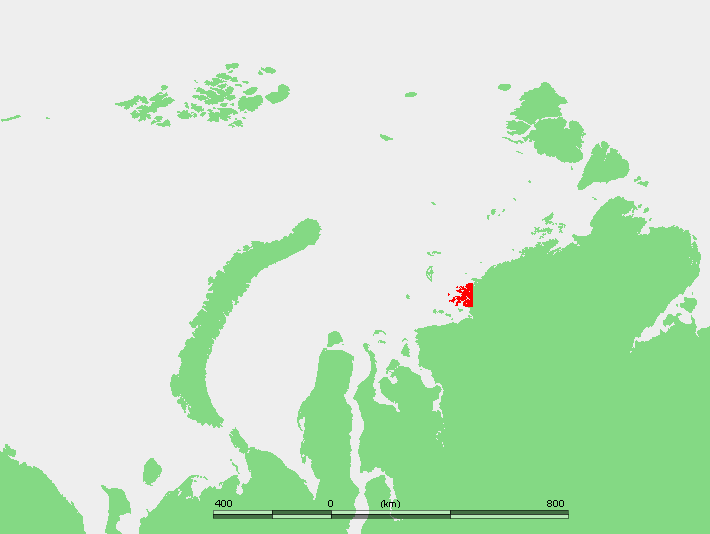
Location of the Minina Skerries. The Plavnikovye Archipelago is in the southern part of the skerry complex.

The Plavnikovye Islands (Russian: острова Плавниковые; Ostrova Plavnikovyye) is a group of islands, in the Kara Sea eastern region, off the coast of Siberia. These islands are covered with tundra vegetation and there are many lakes and swamps. They are under snow and ice during most of the year.

The largest islands of the Plavnikovye Archipelago are Pestsovy Island and Krugly Island. Most of these islands are located and less than 10 km west of the deeply indented shores of the Taymyr Peninsula. But others, like Vardroppera Island, are far offshore. The eastern group of islands, including Kosterina and Pestsovy, are also known as Vkhodnye Islands.

The Plavnikovye Islands, lie south of the small Kolosovykh peninsula. Geologically they are part of the Minina Skerries, a complex formation that includes the Kolosovykh Islands further north. This island group is located between 73° 15' and 74° 40' N and between 84° and 86° 30' E.

The sea surrounding the Plavnikovye Islands is covered with fast ice in the winter and the climate is severe, with bitter and long winters. The surrounding sea is obstructed by pack ice even in the summer.

This island group belongs to the Krasnoyarsk Krai administrative division of the Russian Federation. It is also part of the Great Arctic State Nature Reserve, the largest nature reserve of Russia.

The Plavnikovye Islands should not be confused with Plavnikovy Island (Ostrov Plavnikovy), off the western shores of Severnaya Zemlya, also in the Kara Sea.

== See also ==
- Kara Sea
- Taymyr Peninsula
