= Rusanov expedition =

1912 Russian expedition to the Arctic

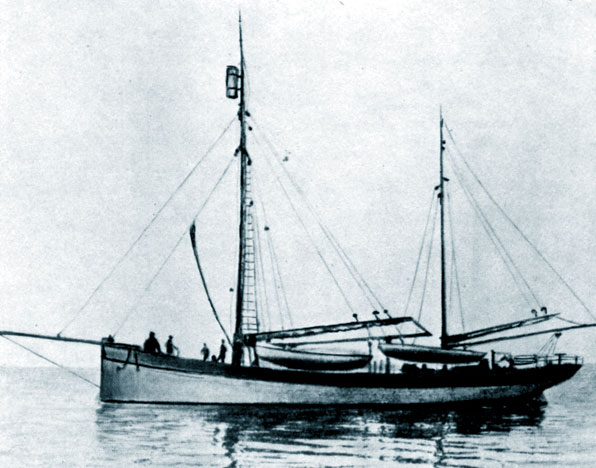
Rusanov's ship, the Hercules; a 63-ton ketch built in Norway in 1908

The Rusanov expedition, led by geologist Vladimir Rusanov, was a 1912 Russian expedition to the Arctic, with an initial objective of establishing mineral claims on Spitsbergen. Following completion of its official programme, Rusanov expanded the expedition's scope to include an investigation of the Northeast Passage, though it remains unclear exactly which route he proposed to take. Rusanov's ship Hercules reached Novaya Zemlya in August 1912, where he sent a message that he was continuing east; this was the last ever heard of the expedition and its 11 personnel.

Artefacts found decades later on islands off the Taymyr Peninsula show that Rusanov managed to round Novaya Zemlya and cross the Kara Sea, and suggest that at least some of the party survived well into 1913, and possibly later. It is generally thought that the expedition met an unknown fate in the area of the Pyasina estuary: it has also been suggested that Rusanov, an experienced Arctic explorer, went as far east as Severnaya Zemlya and the Laptev Sea. The fate of Hercules and its crew remains one of the great mysteries of Russian Arctic exploration.

== Background ==
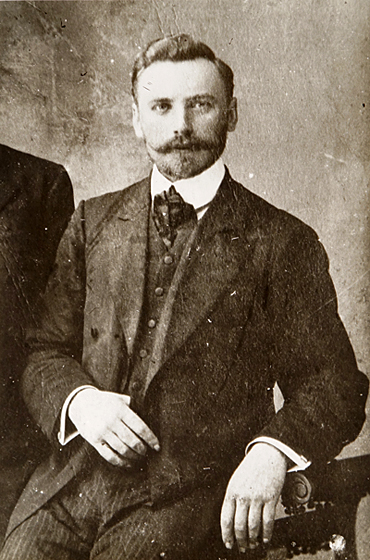
Expedition leader, geologist Vladimir Alexandrovich Rusanov

Rusanov, born in Oryol in 1875, had attended university in Kyiv, but his early academic career was interrupted by his arrest for Marxist political activity. While in prison, he developed an interest in polar exploration after reading about Fridtjof Nansen's voyages; he was then sent into internal exile in Siberia before emigrating to France to complete a doctorate in geology at the Sorbonne.

Returning to Russia in 1907, he overcame government suspicions to take part in a series of successful expeditions to Novaya Zemlya. These gave him considerable experience of Arctic travel, often under challenging conditions. In addition to his important contributions to scientific knowledge of Novaya Zemlya's geology, Rusanov was inspired by the beauty of what he described as the "wild and magnificent" Arctic landscape.

From 1909, Rusanov developed a particular interest in the possibility of a northern sea route from the Atlantic to the Ob and Yenisey rivers, and on to the Pacific. Based on observations and sea temperature measurements made during voyages around Novaya Zemlya's coast in 1910 and 1911, he proposed that the North Atlantic Drift might result in comparatively ice-free conditions to the north of the archipelago. By 1911, he had published several articles outlining the possibility of a regular shipping route along the Siberian coast, using icebreaking freighters and up-to-date meteorological information, and stressing the importance this could have for Russian economic development through the cheap transport of Siberian grain, lumber, and minerals. His ideas in many ways anticipated the later development of the Northern Sea Route under the Soviet Union.

== Preparations for the expedition ==
In spring 1912, the Russian government planned an expedition to investigate coal deposits in Spitsbergen. The island was a political no-man 's-land at the time, and Swedish, British, and American mining companies had already beaten Russia in attempting to establish claims there. Despite continuing reservations over his political background, Rusanov was asked to lead it, due to his experience and excellent record on the expeditions to Novaya Zemlya. He was given a great deal of latitude in organisation and the selection of personnel; he engaged the experienced navigator and oceanographer Alexander Kuchin, a veteran of Amundsen's Fram expedition, as assistant head of the expedition and boat captain.

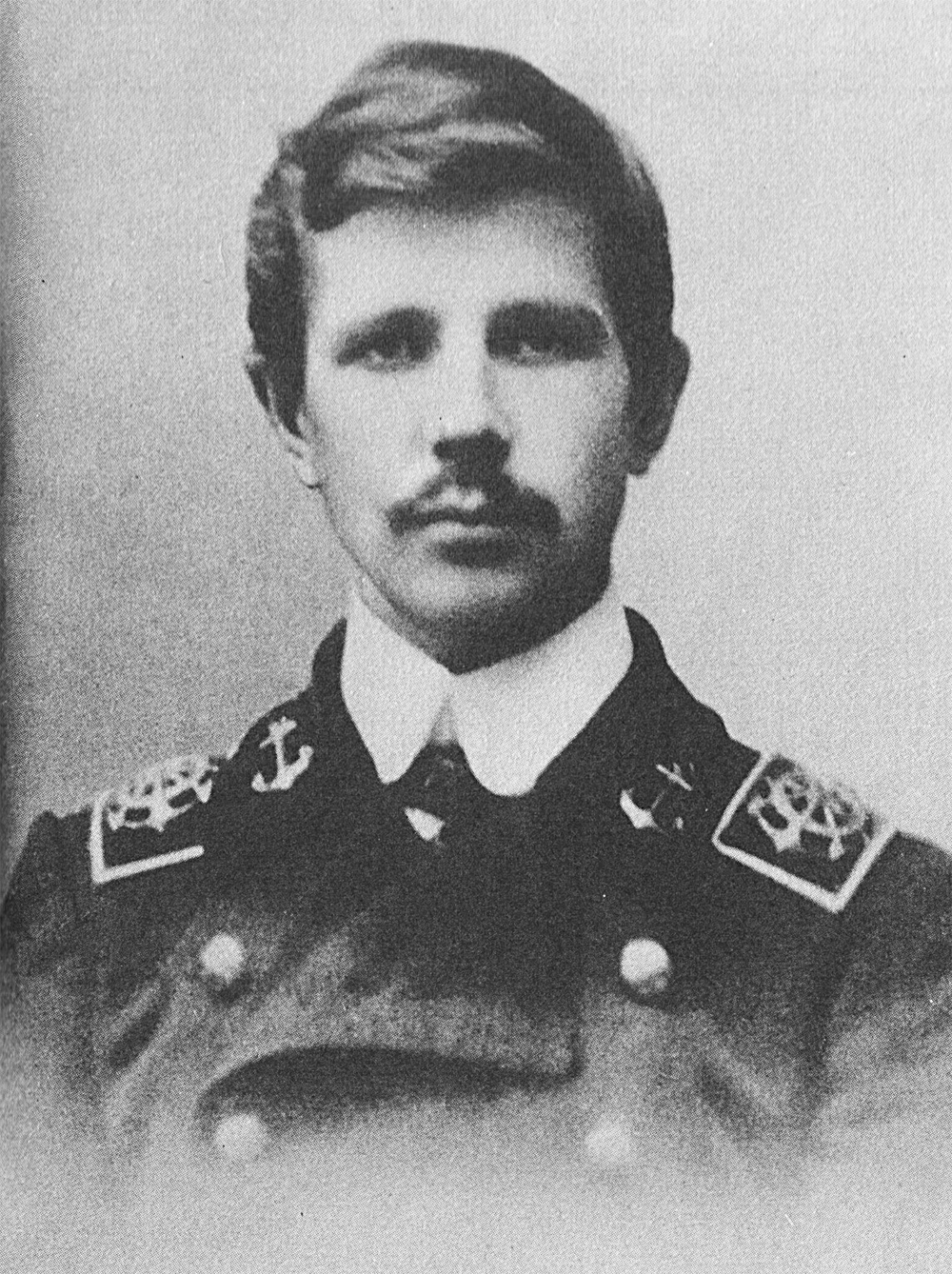
Alexander Kuchin, assistant to Rusanov and captain of Hercules

The other personnel included geologist Rudolf Samoylovich and biologist Zénón Svatoš; Konstantin Semenov, a student at the St Petersburg Polytechnical Institute, was taken on as engineer after his department head asked him to join. The remaining crew comprised Konstantin Belov, mate, Alexander Popov, bosun, F. A. Bykovsky, assistant engineer, and sailors V. T. Cheremkhin, A. S. Chukhchin, A. A. Ravvinov, V. G. Popov, and F. M. Ermolin. The last member of the expedition was Rusanov's fiancée, Juliette Jean-Sossine, who was working towards both a geology PhD at the Sorbonne and a medical degree. Rusanov sought approval for her inclusion in several "extremely diplomatic" letters to the authorities and to her family, which stressed her scientific abilities.

Rusanov had initially wanted to build a vessel to his own specifications, but the government refused; he and Kuchin instead travelled to Norway in April 1912 to buy one. In Alesund, they found a 1908-built sealer, Hercules (Russian: Геркулес, "Gerkules"), of 63 tons, which had already been well tested in Greenland waters. Although its kerosene engine was rated at only 24 hp, Rusanov reported that Hercules had impressive sailing qualities; they purchased it along with spares, two boats, a motor whaleboat, kayaks, and tents. Rusanov then had to return quickly to Paris to buy scientific instruments before travelling to St Petersburg to produce a progress report; he then organised the transfer of the expedition equipment at Alexandrovsk to Hercules, which Kuchin had sailed from Norway.

== Spitsbergen ==
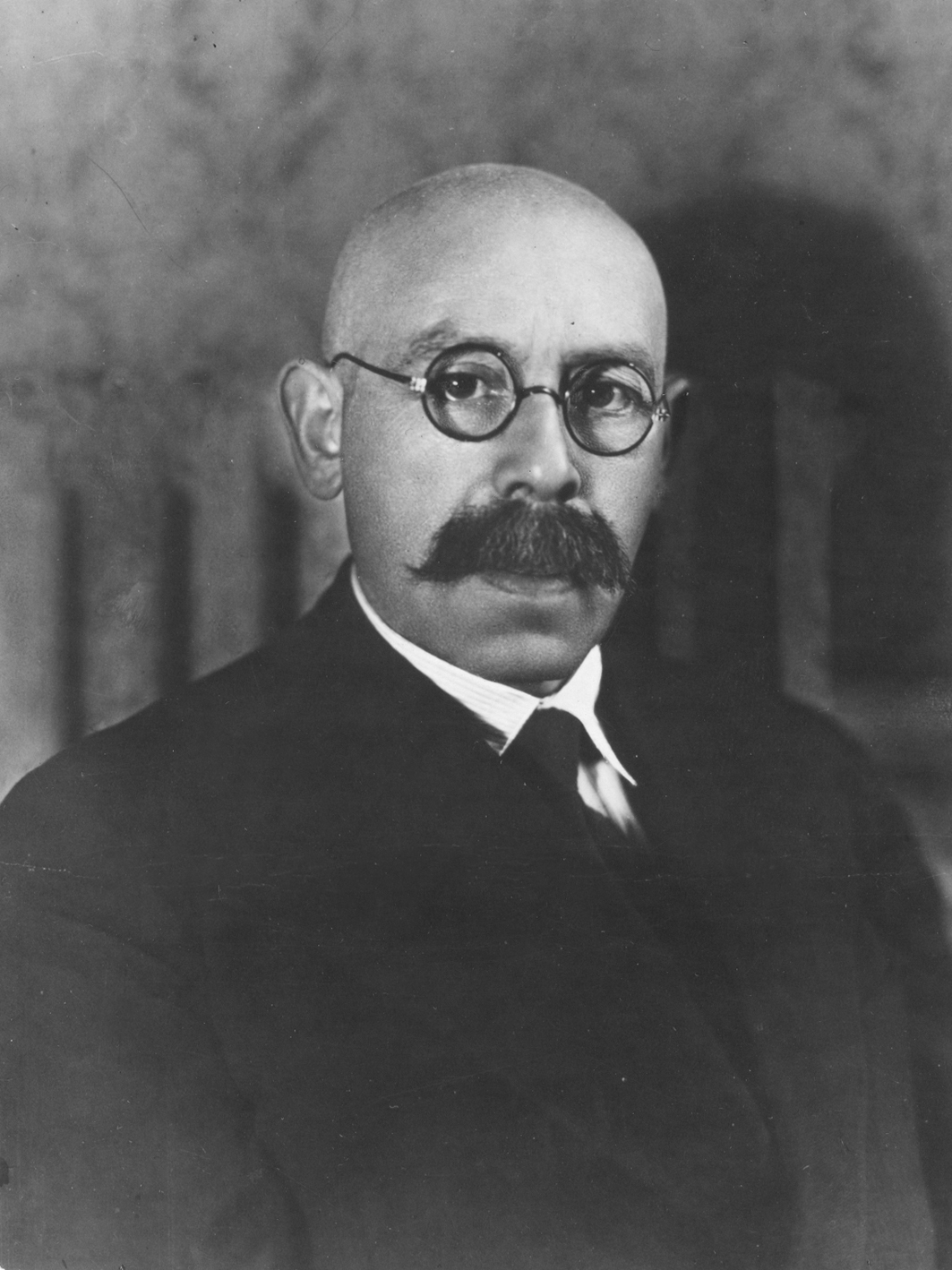
Geologist Rudolf Samoylovich; he left the expedition following the survey of Spitsbergen, believing Rusanov's supplies to be inadequate for a proposed wintering in the Arctic

The expedition left Alexandrovsk on 26 June, arriving at Bellsund on 3 July. After an initial overland traverse of 200 km, Rusanov and his team over the next six weeks made another 1000 km of geological traverses, staking 28 claims on promising coal deposits. On completion of work in Spitsbergen, Rusanov announced to the expedition members he planned to sail east rather than returning to port, and it became clear he was considering taking the opportunity to investigate the Northern Sea Route. He seems to have asked for volunteers to accompany him: Samoilovich and Svatoš returned home via Norway on a passing steamer along with the expedition field reports and scientific collections, as did A. Popov, who was in poor health. Rusanov also sent a message to St Petersburg advising "programme completely executed [...] am going east".

The government had not authorised the change of plan, and the degree to which expedition members were aware of Rusanov's intentions in advance is uncertain. While the student Semonov wrote to his parents that he would be back from Spitsbergen by early October at the latest, Vasily Cheremkhin, one of the sailors, wrote before leaving Alexandrovsk that they would be sailing from "Spitsbergen to Franz Josef Land [...] clearly we'll have to winter". Samoilovich later claimed that before leaving he attempted to dissuade Rusanov and Kuchin from wintering, suggesting the ship was too small and their supplies inadequate; Kuchin supposedly agreed and said they would "turn back" if threatened by ice.

Rusanov himself seems to have been overwhelmingly confident, writing to his mother, "We can winter perfectly well. We are extremely well supplied [...] the ship is strong, with plenty of experience in ice [...] Do not worry about us". He was by this time a seasoned Arctic traveller, with a great deal of experience of small boat navigation around Novaya Zemlya, while Amundsen had successfully traversed the Northwest Passage in 1902–5 in an even smaller vessel. However, given the unknown conditions in the eastern Kara Sea, the northerly route proposed around Novaya Zemlya, and the late season, Rusanov's plan remained an extremely risky, possibly irresponsible undertaking.

== Voyage to Novaya Zemlya and loss of the expedition ==
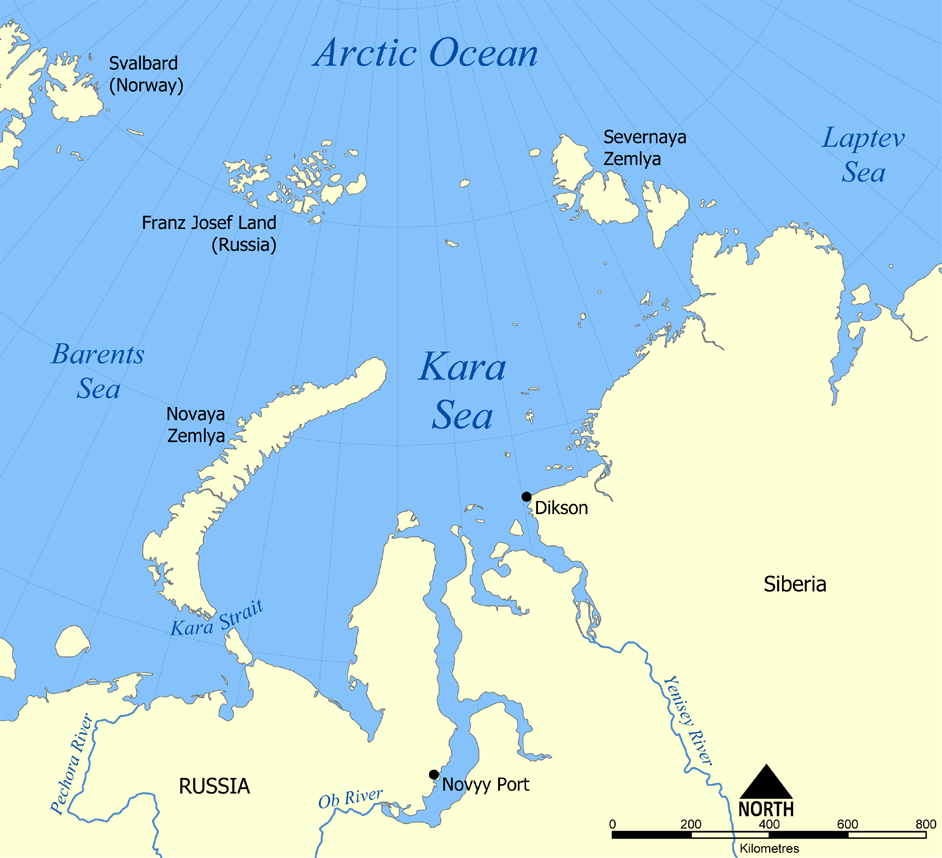
The Kara Sea; Rusanov intended to round the northern tip of Novaya Zemlya, then sail east. Traces of the expedition were found in the 1930s on the coast, some 200km north-east of Dikson.

After leaving Spitsbergen, Hercules crossed the Barents Sea. The next communication from Rusanov was dated August 31 N.S.; left at a Nenets settlement at the western end of the strait of Matochkin Shar on Novaya Zemlya, it was passed on via ship and telegram to St Petersburg. He stated he intended to round the northern tip of Novaya Zemlya, then go east across the Kara Sea, with his projected route – past Uyedineniya Island, the New Siberian Islands and Wrangel Island – possibly signalling his intent to attempt the North-East Passage. This was to be the final message received from the expedition, none of whose members were ever seen again. Conditions in the Kara Sea in 1912–13 were unusually harsh, with exceptional amounts of ice.

By the spring of 1913, public concern over Rusanov's fate was mounting, particularly given that two other Russian expeditions to the Arctic – those of Brusilov and Sedov – had gone missing in the same year. The Russian Geographical Society led efforts lobbying the government to organise a rescue mission. By early 1914, the Naval Ministry had been ordered to mount an effort to locate Sedov. Although the government was generally reluctant to get involved, this was later expanded to Rusanov and Brusilov. Given the vagueness of Rusanov's intentions in his last telegrams, no one knew where to start searching, and all three expedition leaders were widely regarded as having displayed "incredible irresponsibility". The Council of Ministers made a note that, in future steps, should be taken to protect the Treasury from the expenses of Arctic rescue missions.

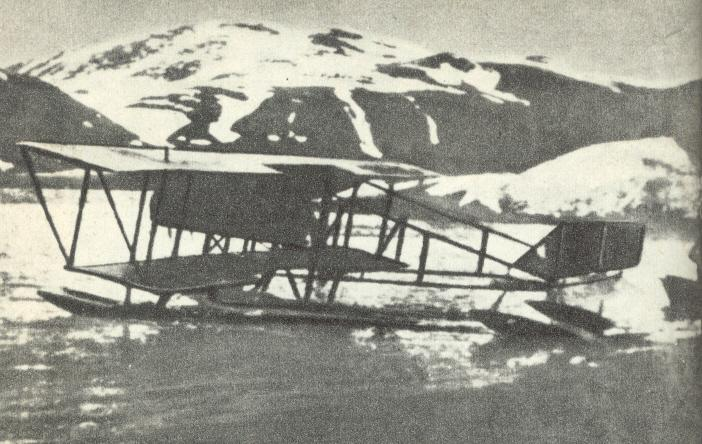
The Farman MF.11 aeroplane of Jan Nagórski, who carried out the first Arctic flights in history in August–September 1914 while searching for traces of Rusanov, Sedov and Brusilov's expeditions

The task of locating Rusanov and Brusilov was given to the Norwegian Otto Sverdrup, who set out in the whaler Eklips. By mid August 1914, Eklips was already intermittently icebound in the Kara Sea, and by September, Sverdrup had decided to winter in the ice off the Taymyr Peninsula. He was ordered to abandon the search for Hercules after making radio contact with the Imperial Navy icebreakers Vaygach and Taymyr, wintering 280 km to the north; Sverdrup was asked to assist an overland evacuation of part of their crew. After successfully carrying out this mission, he continued searching for Rusanov during the following summer, but found no trace of the Hercules or its crew. Aviator Jan Nagórski made the first polar flights in history in August–September 1914 from Novaya Zemlya in a further unsuccessful bid to locate the lost expeditions.

== Discovery of traces of expedition ==
World War I intervened, and for the next twenty years, a great deal of speculation and controversy surrounded the fate of the Rusanov expedition. The first evidence was found in 1934, when the vessel Stalinets was surveying the south-eastern shore of the Kara Sea. On the small island of Veyzel (later renamed Hercules Island) in the Mona Islands, a wooden post inscribed "Hercules, 1913" was discovered embedded in a cairn near the shoreline. This showed that the expedition had successfully rounded Nova Zemlya into the Kara Sea, and was speculated to have possibly marked Rusanov's wintering site in 1913.

Later the same year, another party from Stalinets came ashore at an islet in the Minina Skerries, some distance south-west of the Mona Islands. Here, oceanographer M. Tsyganyuk discovered the remains of a hunting knife, camera, clothing, spent shells, and other items, including papers belonging to a Hercules crew member, Chukhchin, and a watch belonging to V. Popov; nearby, a rough shelter had been constructed from driftwood logs laid against a rock. A follow-up visit two years later found a notebook inscribed by Rusanov; the finds suggested that, with supplies running low, Rusanov sent some members of the expedition, including Popov and Chukhchin, back southwards overland, probably towards the nearest settlements on the lower Yenisey.

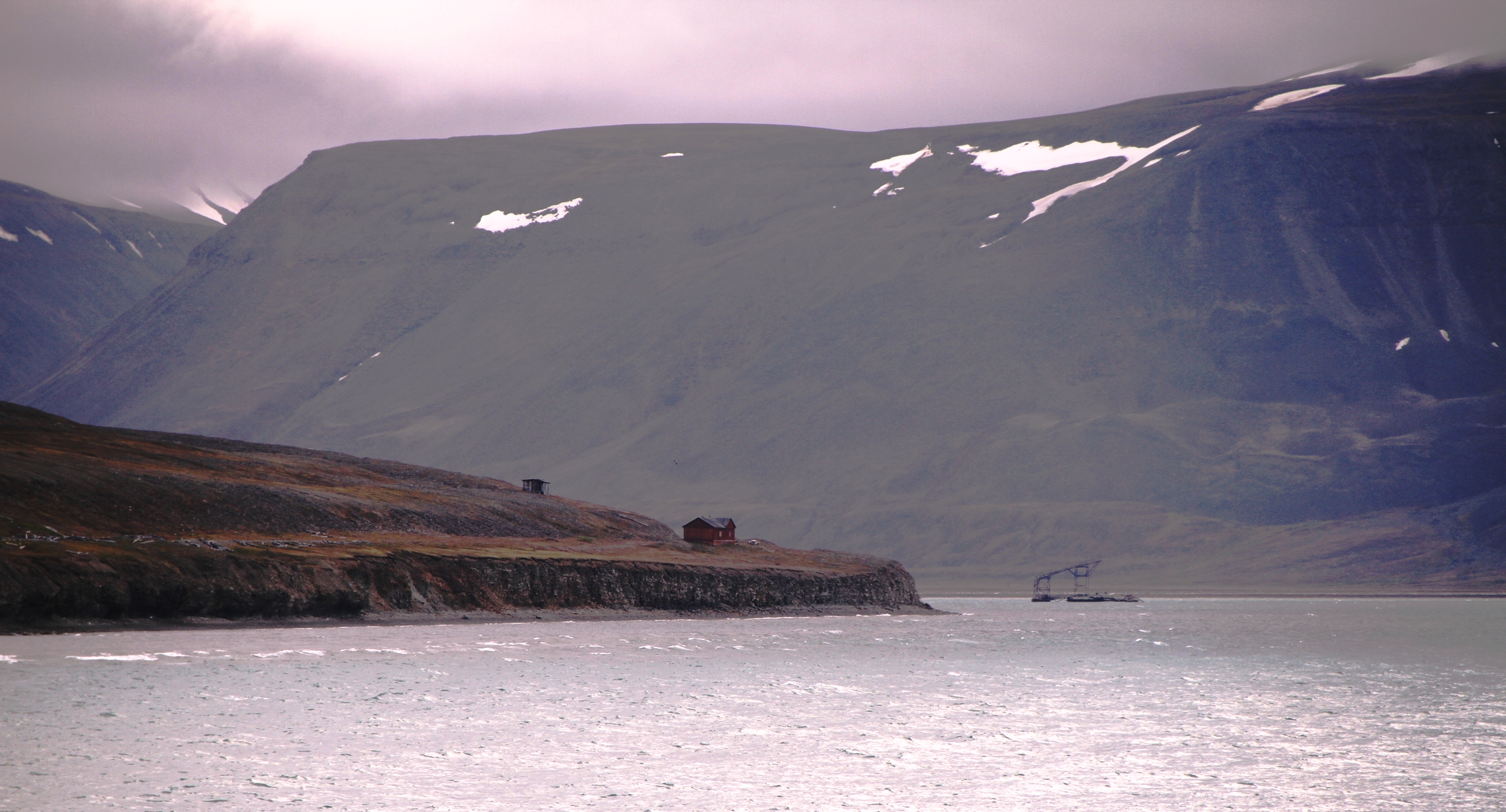
The Rusanoffhuset, a hut supposedly constructed by Rusanov's team in 1912 at Colesbukta on Spitsbergen, now preserved as a memorial and self-guided museum

The most controversial find was reported in 1949, when A. S. Kosoy wrote that a surveying party had found bones and traces of a campsite on the eastern shores of Bolshevik Island in Severnaya Zemlya in 1947. Kosoy suggested these were related to the Rusanov expedition, implying that Hercules had successfully travelled as far east as the Laptev Sea before being wrecked and that Rusanov could speculatively be credited with the discovery of the Severnaya Zemlya archipelago. A theory based on Kosoy's report suggests that, thanks to northeasterly winds in the summer of 1912, the expedition could have found a relatively ice-free passage in the northern Kara Sea as far as Severnaya Zemlya, wintering there in 1912, but then became trapped there. Popov and Chukhchin's group could have been sent back later in 1913 when supplies began to run short, leaving the marker on Hercules Island en route. (Note: The "Hercules" marker also bore the inscription "V.P", possibly for "Vasily Popov"; this may imply that the expedition leaders Rusanov and Kuchin were not responsible for leaving it.) Inconsistencies in Kosoy's story have, however, suggested that Kosoy misrepresented or exaggerated the finds, and it remains very doubtful whether Rusanov and his crew reached the Laptev Sea.

By the 1970s, a re-examination of earlier records uncovered further evidence from the eastern shore of the Kara Sea. A 1921 search party looking for Peter Tessem and Paul Knutsen, two men lost from Amundsen's Maud expedition in 1919 while attempting to reach the weather station at Dikson overland, found several old camp fires on the Mikhailov Peninsula on the Taymyr mainland, along with artefacts such as shotgun shells, coins, and a boat hook. These were for many years linked with Tessem and Knudsen, but a later comparison of the records matched the shells with a type found at the site in the Minina Skerries, showing that the campsites in fact related to Rusanov's expedition.

In more recent years, a 2000 expedition organised by a media company from Oryol found human bones near Mt. Minin, which were identified as likely belonging to Alexander Kuchin, captain of the Hercules.

== Sources ==
- Barr, William (1974). "Rusanov, Gerkules and the Northern Sea Route". Canadian Slavonic Papers / Revue Canadienne des Slavistes. 16 (4).
- Barr, William (1983). "The Last Journey of Peter Tessem and Paul Knutsen, 1919". Arctic. 36 (4). doi:10.14430/arctic2286.
- Barr, William (1985). "Imperial Russia's pioneers in Arctic aviation". Arctic. 38 (3). doi:10.14430/arctic2137.
- Shumilov and Shparo (1979). "Personnel of Rusanov". Vokrug Seta. 11.
- Veselyansky, Yuri (2019). "Ледовитоокеанская мечта Владимира Русанова". goarctic.ru.
