= The Star and Death of Joaquin Murieta =

- Звезда и смерть Хоакина Мурьеты
- Directed by: Vladimir Grammatikov
- Written by: Vladimir Grammatikov; Pavel Grushko; Aleksey Timm
- Starring: Andrey Kharitonov; Alyona Belyak; Aleksandr Filippenko; Eduard Martsevich
- Cinematography: Aleksandr Antipenko
- Music by: Alexey Rybnikov
- Release date: 1982
- Country: Soviet Union
- Language: Russian

The Star and Death of Joaquin Murieta (Russian: Звезда и смерть Хоакина Мурьеты) is a 1982 Soviet musical drama film directed by Vladimir Grammatikov.

== Plot ==
Together with fellow villagers from an impoverished corner of Chile, Joaquin Murieta embarked on the long journey to far-off California, lured by the promise of gold. Along the way, he met a young woman of striking beauty, who became his wife. But their joy was short-lived. The gold seekers soon found themselves confronted by the cruelty and prejudice of the Americans. Joaquin’s beloved was raped and slain — and he took up arms to avenge her death. Yet no retribution could lessen the weight of his sorrow.

== Cast ==
- Andrey Kharitonov as Joaquin Murieta
- Alyona Belyak as Teresa
- Aleksandr Filippenko as Death
- Eduard Martsevich as Organ-Grinder
- Oksana Bochkova as Little Girl Chile
- Sokrat Abdukadyrov as Three-Fingered
- Semyon Chungak
- Adel Al-Khadad
- Elgudzha Gagishvili
- Igor Surovtsev
