= Boris Chukhnovsky =

Soviet aircraft pilot (1898–1975)

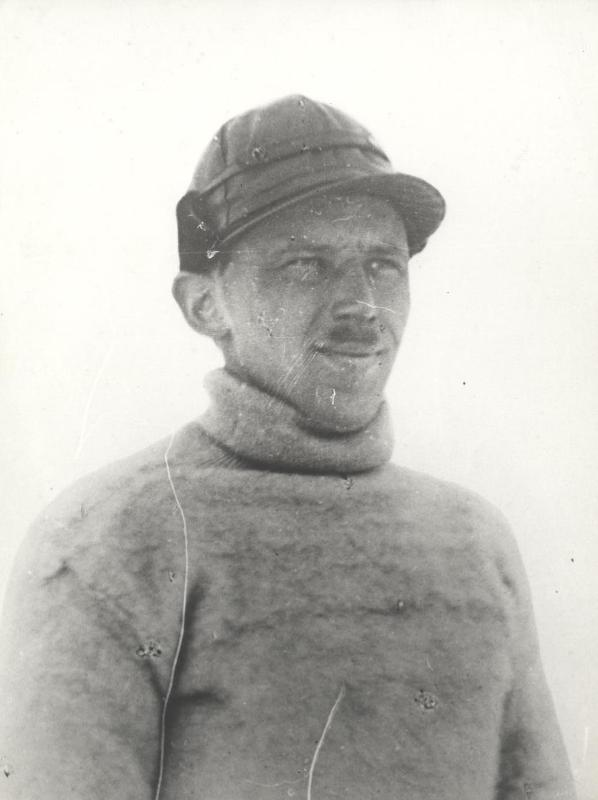
Boris Chukhnovsky, 1928.

Boris Grigoryevich Chukhnovsky (Russian: Борис Григорьевич Чухновский, 9 April [O.S. 28 March] 1898, Saint Petersburg - September 30, 1975, Moscow) was a Russian and Soviet pilot and Arctic explorer. He participated in the rescue of the Airship Italia in 1928 and in the search of the Sigizmund Levanevsky airplane in 1937–1938. He also created, together with Robert Bartini, a dedicated airplane for Arctic research (the Bartini DAR).

Boris Chukhnovsky was born in Saint Petersburg and graduated from a Realschule in Gatchina. In June 1916 he enlisted himself to Navy, as his father insisted, however, in March 1917 he transferred to the School of Naval Pilots, in Petrograd. He graduated from the School in November 1917, and was eventually appointed Chief of Oranienbaum air detachment of the Baltic Sea. Between November 1918 and July 1920 he was involved in the Russian Civil War as a pilot on the Red Army side, mostly in the southern front.

In the fall of 1923 Chukhnovsky was dispatched to the Naval Academy in Petrograd. Next year, he was working as an intern on the cartography and hydrography of the Russian Arctic. In particular, as a part of the Northern Hydrographic Expedition headed by Nikolay Matusevich, Chukhnovsky performed a number of flights from Novaya Zemlya to the Barents and Kara Seas. In 1925 he continued this work by taking the aerial photos of Novaya Zemlya in the region of the Matochkin Strait. In 1927, he dropped out of the Naval Academy and started to work full-time as an Arctic pilot. He was essentially one of the pioneers of Soviet Arctic aviation.

In May 1928, the Soviet Union joined the efforts to save the Airship Italia expedition returning from the North Pole. The icebreaker Krasin was detached to participate in the rescue efforts, and the Soviet part of the efforts was coordinated by Rudolf Samoylovich, Paul Oras, and Chukhnovsky. On July 10 Chukhnovsky performed the second flight (after an earlier abortive attempt) and discovered the group of Finn Malmgren which was sent from the Italia crew to the mainland. He reported the discovery to the Krasin, however, subsequently due to limited visibility was not able to return to the icebreaker and landed on ice when the fuel was running out. Chukhnovsky send a radio message to Krasin giving detailed info on the Malmgren group location and insisting that rescuing the group has a higher priority than rescuing the Chukhnovsky plane. Malmgren died, but the two other members of the group, Philippo Zappi and Arcibaldo Mariano, were taken on board of the Krasin on July 12. On July 15 and 16 Chukhnovsky and his crew were taken on board as well. For five days, Chukhnovsky was staying on ice. Boris Chukhnovsky was awarded the Order of the Red Banner, at the time the highest award of the Soviet Union, for his participation in the rescue efforts. In 1928 and 1929 he toured Europe giving presentations on the expedition. (Chukhnovsky spoke German and French in addition to his native Russian).

In 1929, Boris Chukhnovsky started to work for the Chief Directorate of the Northern Sea Route and participated in creation of the Arctic aviation service. He was the head of the service until 1931. Between 1931 and 1933, he was making flights in order to get information on the ice situation in the Arctic. Until that point, Soviet Arctic aviation only used foreign-made aircraft (predominantly Junkers). In June 1933, Chukhnovsky was tasked with developing a Soviet-made flying boat which could work in the Arctic. The constructor of the DAR airplane, of which only one machine was produced, was Robert Bartini.

During World War II Boris Chukhnovsky was attached to the White Sea Flotilla, and in February 1943 transferred to the Chief Directorate of the Northern Sea Route, where he was tasked with the ice reconnaissance for the military convoys. In July 1945, he was discharged from the Soviet Army and simultaneously made a colonel.

Chukhnovsky died in 1975 and is buried in Gatchina.
