= Ivanov (film) =

- Film poster
- Russian: Иванов
- Directed by: Vadim Dubrovitsky
- Written by: Mikhail Bartenev; Vadim Dubrovitskiy
- Produced by: Vadim Dubrovitsky
- Starring: Anna Dubrovskaya; Vladimir Ilyin; Yuri Kalinnikov; Eduard Martsevich; Aleksey Serebryakov; Bogdan Stupka
- Cinematography: Vadim Semyonovykh
- Music by: Mark Erman
- Release date: June 2010 (Moscow)
- Country: Russia
- Language: Russian

Ivanov (Russian: Иванов) is a 2010 Russian drama film directed by Vadim Dubrovitsky.

== Plot ==
The film tells about a man who brings one negative to the world and cannot find harmony.

== Cast ==
- Anna Dubrovskaya as Anna Petrovna Ivanova
- Vladimir Ilyin as Mikhail Mihaylovich Borkin
- Yuri Kalinnikov
- Eduard Martsevich as Matvey Semenovich Shabelskiy
- Aleksey Serebryakov as Nikolay Alekseevich Ivanov
- Bogdan Stupka as Pavel Kirillyich Lebedev
