= Minina Skerries =

Islands in the Kara Sea, on the northwestern shores of Siberia

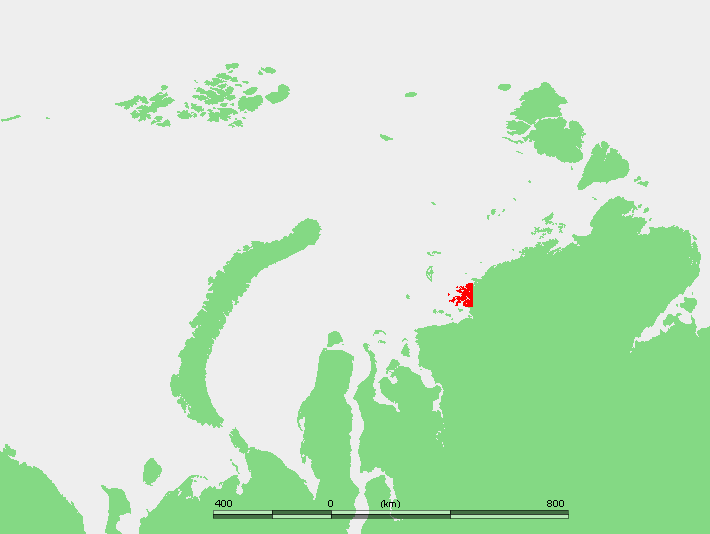
Location of the Minina Skerries.

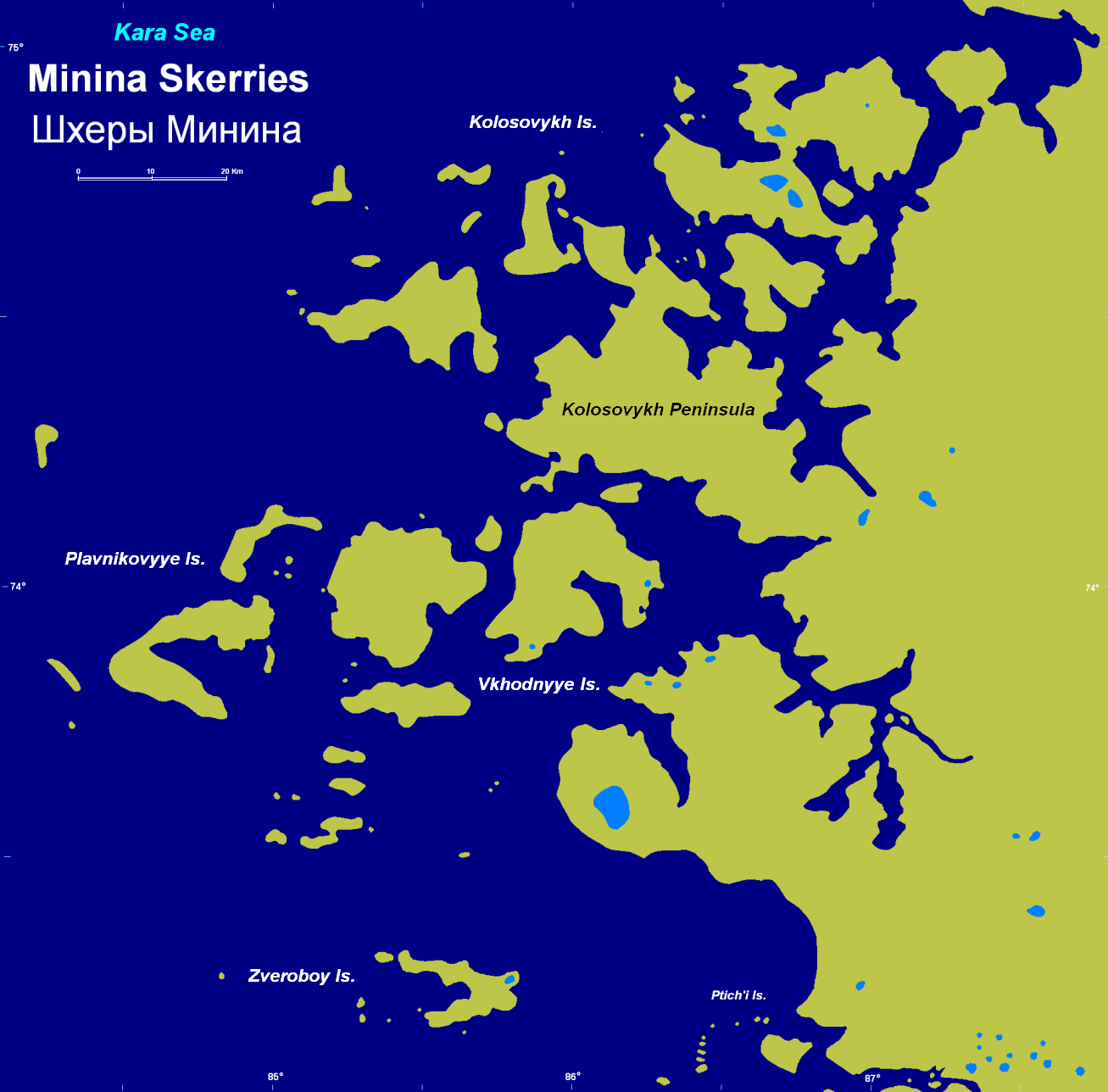
The complex coastline of the Minina Skerries.

The Minina Skerries (Russian: Шхеры Минина; Shkhery Minina) are located in the Kara Sea, in the northwestern shores of Siberia. They stretch between the Mikhailov Peninsula and the mouths of the river Pyasina. Their latitude is between 74° and 75° N, and their longitude between 84° and 87° 30' E.

These skerries are a complex system of islands, channels and small peninsulas on the bleak tundra coast of the Taymyr Peninsula. Winters are long and bitter, so the coast and the islands are merged as an icy whole for the greatest part of the year. The summer thaw typically lasts only about two months in an average season.

The Minina Skerries include the Kolosovykh Islands, the Kolosovykh Peninsula, and the Plavnikovyye Islands, as well as other minor coastal islands and deep inlets. They all belong to the Krasnoyarsk Krai administrative division of the Russian Federation.

There is a great variety of Arctic fauna in the Minina Skerries and the whole area is part of the Great Arctic State Nature Reserve, the largest nature reserve of Russia.

== History ==
This cold region was first explored by Fridtjof Nansen and then, more in depth, by Baron Eduard von Toll during his last venture, the Russian Arctic Expedition of 1900–1903 on ship Zarya. Eduard Toll and Zarya's captain Nikolai Nikolaevich Kolomeitsev were quite frustrated with the navigation through the tortuous waters of these skerries. In his writings Toll described this whole area as a labyrinth.

The Zarya took a week to negotiate these complicated waters and it ran aground three times. Despite some inaccuracies in the measurements of positions and identification of islands, Toll and the scientists of his expedition went ashore at many islands and headlands, naming them and contributing useful scientific data on this relatively unknown area of the Arctic. The name of the entire Minina Skerries was first given by Toll and his expedition members. They were named after Russian polar explorer Fedor Alekseyevich Minin.
