= Rudolf Samoylovich =

Soviet polar explorer

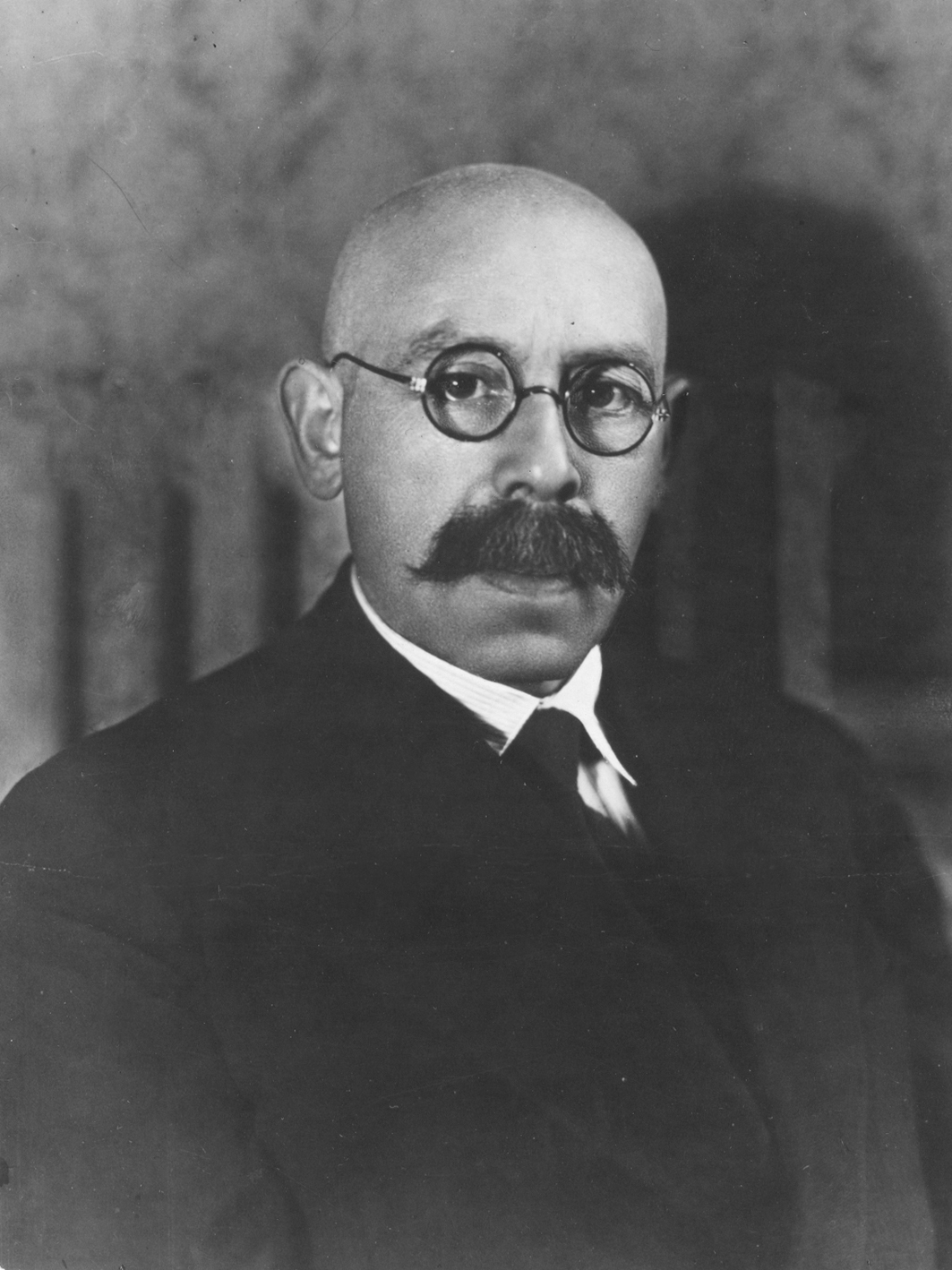
Rudolf Samoylovich

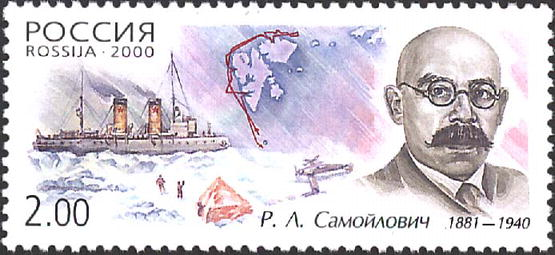
Rudolf Samoylovich on a 2000 Russian stamp

Rudolf (Ruvim) Lazarevich Samoylovich (Russian: Рудольф Лазаревич Самойлович; 13 September (O.S. 1 September), 1881 – 4 March 1939) (Note: According to the Great Soviet Encyclopedia, he was executed in 1940.) was a Soviet polar explorer, professor, and doctor of geographic sciences.

== Biography ==
Samoylovich was born into the family of a Jewish merchant in Azov. After graduating from the Mariupol Gymnasium (ru), he studied physics and mathematics at Imperial Novorossiya University where he became involved in revolutionary activities and came under police surveillance. Under pressure from his concerned mother, he relocated to Germany and studied at the Mining Academy in Freiberg. While in Germany he remained politically active, including by shipping to Azov copies of the underground newspaper Iskra. After graduating in 1904, he returned to Azov and worked on the underground printing of revolutionary literature.

In 1906, he moved to Rostov-on-Don. Samoylovich participated in rallies and campaigns to organize railroad workers, Cossacks, and soldiers. During this time he was once again under police surveillance and was arrested in July 1906. He lived in Saint Petersburg for two years as an accountant under the pseudonym Sorokin. During this time he was involved with the Russian Social Democratic Labour Party. He was arrested and exiled to Pinega. In 1910, he was allowed to relocate to the nearby city of Arkhangelsk where he became involved in Arctic studies and met Vladimir Rusanov.

In 1912, he participated in Rusanov's geological expedition to Spitsbergen. Samoylovich was one of the initiators and the first director of the Northern Research and Trade Expedition. In 1925, this research center was reorganized into the Institute of Northern Studies, which was headed by Samoylovich until 1930. The institute was reorganized as the All-Union Arctic Institute in which Samoylovich served as deputy director from 1932 to 1938. Samoylovich founded the Department of Polar Countries at Leningrad State University and served as its chairman from 1934 to 1937.

During this period, Samoylovich also took part in numerous Arctic expeditions. In 1928 he commanded the icebreaker Krassin in a mission to rescue survivors of the airship Italia which had crashed during an expedition to the North Pole. He led the scientific team on the 1931 Arctic expedition of the airship Graf Zeppelin, which studied magnetism and mapped Franz Josef Land. He then led Arctic expeditions on several icebreakers: Vladimir Rusanov in 1932, Georgiy Sedov in 1934, and Sadko in 1936 and 1937–1938.

Samoylovich was arrested in May 1938 and was shot on March 4, 1939, in Leningrad. He was posthumously rehabilitated in 1957.

== Legacy ==
A strait and a glacier top on Franz Josef Land, a bay on Novaya Zemlya, an island in Severnaya Zemlya, a peninsula and a nunatak in Antarctica bear Rudolf Samoylovich's name as does a liquified natural gas carrier built in 2018. He was awarded the Order of Lenin and Order of the Red Banner of Labour.

In The Red Tent, a 1969 Soviet-Italian film about the Italia expedition, Samoylovich is played by Grigory Gai (ru).

Since 1981, the house where Samoylovich lived in Azov has been operated as a museum.
