= Finn Malmgren =

Swedish meteorologist and explorer (1895–1928)

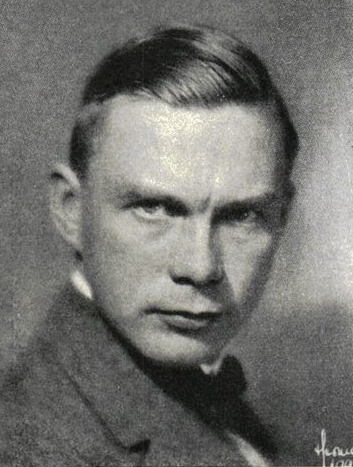
- Born: Finn Adolf Erik Johan Malmgren; 9 January 1895; Gothenburg, Sweden
- Died: June 1928 (aged 32); Northeast of Nordaustlandet
- Education: Uppsala University
- Occupations: Meteorologist, Arctic explorer
- Known for: Italia expedition

Finn Adolf Erik Johan Malmgren (9 January 1895 – c. June 1928) was a Swedish meteorologist and Arctic explorer.

== Biography ==
Malmgren studied in Gothenburg, Sundsvall, and Stockholm. In 1912, he began his studies at Uppsala University where he received a bachelor's degree in 1916. In 1917, Malmgren became assistant to professor Axel Hamberg in his observatory at Pårtetjåkko; in 1920, he returned to the meteorological institute in Uppsala and a year later was appointed assistant professor at Otto Pettersson's hydrographic institute for oceanic studies on an island in the Gullmarsfjord.

From 1922 to 1925, Malmgren participated in the expedition of Roald Amundsen and Harald Ulrik Sverdrup in the Arctic, on board the Maud. In 1926, he was on board the Italian airship Norge which overflew the North Pole, where he used scientific instruments from František Běhounek.

In early 1927, he was decorated as a Commander of the Order of St. Olav.

In 1928, the scientist joined the polar expedition of Umberto Nobile with the in airship Italia. During the third flight, on 25 May, the airship crashed and several members of the expedition were stranded on floating ice, Malmgren with an injured shoulder among them. On 30 May, Malmgren together with Italian officers Filippo Zappi and Adalberto Mariano, decided to walk back to Kings Bay for help. On 15–16 June, Malmgren collapsed and asked to be left behind. On 11 July, Soviet pilot Boris Chukhnovsky from the icebreaker Krasin sighted Mariano and Zappi and also Malmgren's body. Mariano and Zappi were rescued the next day; Malmgren's body was never found.

The circumstances of Malmgren's death remain unclear. In the press Zappi and Mariano were suspected of abandoning Malmgren and even of cannibalising him.
