= The Red Tent (Nagibin novel) =

Novel by Yuri Nagibin

The Red Tent is a 1960 novel by Yuri Nagibin. It served as a basis for the screenplay for the 1969 film of the same name.
