= František Běhounek =

Czech physicist, explorer and writer

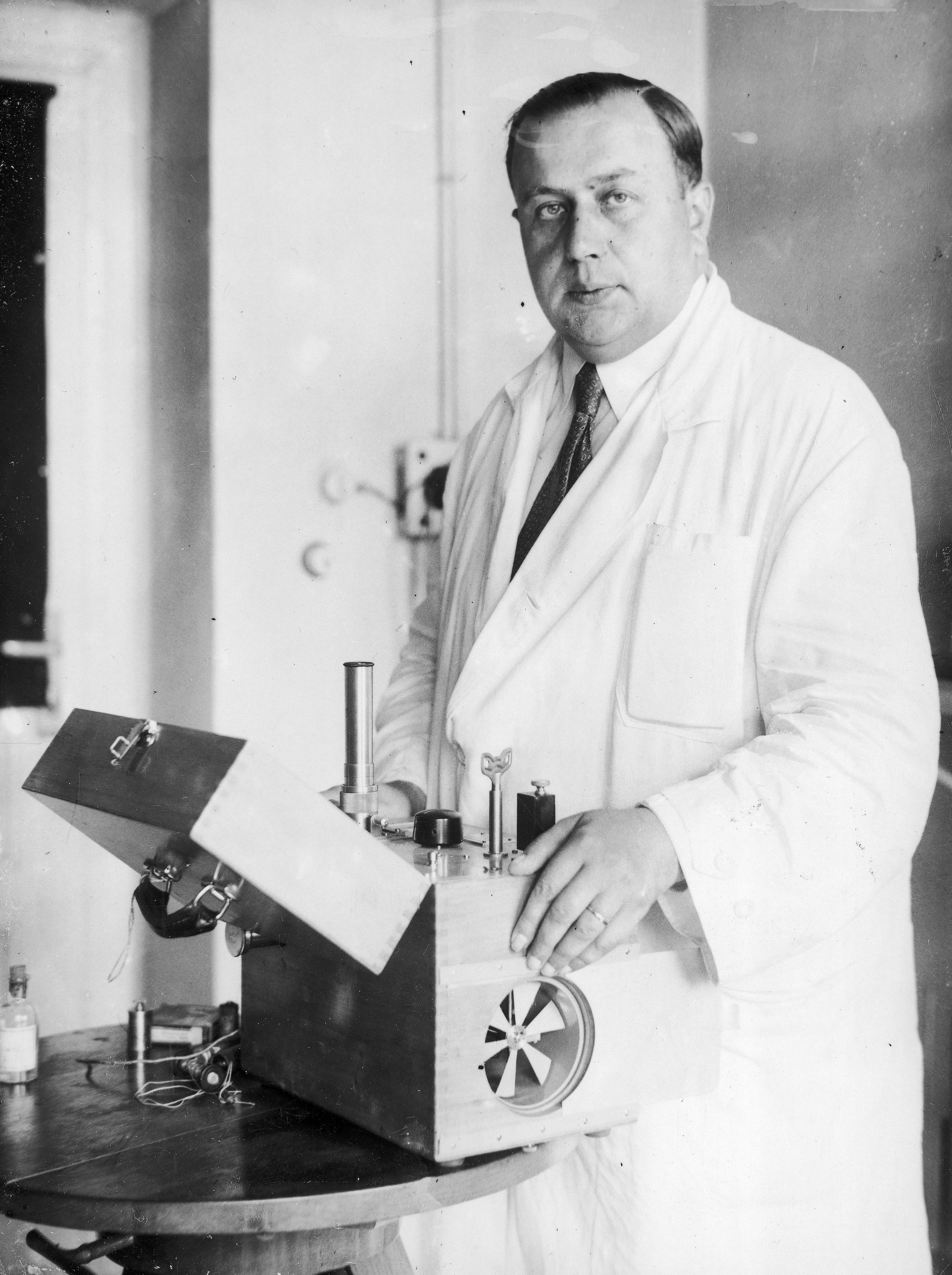
Běhounek in 1938

František Běhounek (Czech pronunciation: [ˈfraɲcɪʃɛk ˈbjɛɦounɛk]; 27 October 1898 – 1 January 1973) was a Czech physicist, explorer and writer. He is known for his science fiction books for youth.

== Biography ==
Běhounek was born on 27 October 1898 in Prague. He studied physics and mathematics at Charles University, later radiology in France with Marie Curie-Skłodowska. In the 1920s, he was one of the founders of State Radiological Institute. In 1926, he took part in an expedition of Roald Amundsen to the North Pole with the airship Norge. In 1928, as an expert on cosmic rays, he was a member of crew of airship Italia led by Umberto Nobile. He survived its crash on the Arctic ice on 25 May 1928, and later described it in his book Trosečníci na kře ledové ('Castaways on an ice floe').

As a scientist, he worked in industrial companies, medical institutions, universities and in the state academy. From the 1950s on, he participated in UNESCO projects.

Běhounek died on 1 January 1973 in Karlovy Vary, at the age of 74.

== Works ==
Běhounek published about 28 novels (most of them aimed at young people, popularizing science or science fiction) and many scientific works.

- Trosečníci na kře ledové (translation: "Survivors on cold ice") – about the ill-fated Italia airship expedition to the north pole (1928)
- Boj o zeměkouli – sci-fi novel (Prague, 1939)
- Tajemství polárního moře – adventure novel about a north pole expedition (Prague, 1942)
- Kletba zlata – short stories (Prague, 1942)
- Svět nejmenších rozměrů (Prague, 1945)
- Případ profesora Hrona – sci-fi novel (Prague, 1947)
- Swansonova výprava – sci-fi novel (Prague, 1949)
- Akce L – sci-fi novel (1956)
- Robinsoni vesmíru – sci-fi novel (1958)
- Tábor v lese (Prague, 1960)
- Projekt Scavenger – sci-fi novel (Prague, 1961)
- Fregata pluje kolem světa – adventure novel about Austrian Imperial expedition of SMS Novara (Prague, 1969)

== Honours ==
The asteroid 3278 Běhounek is named after him.
