= Giuseppe Biagi (explorer) =

Italian explorer (1897–1965)

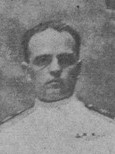

Giuseppe Biagi (2 February 1897 in Medicina – 1 November 1965 in Rome) was an Italian soldier, explorer and radio operator. He was one of the survivors of the deadly crash of the airship Italia in May 1928 during Umberto Nobile's expedition to the North Pole.

== Biography ==
Son of Raffaele Biagi and Virginia Natali, he was born and grew up at a farm in the Bolognese countryside, together with his brothers Cesira and Alfredo. In 1903 the family moved to Bologna, where he continued his studies at the Aldini technical institute (it).

In 1911, he started working on boats in Rimini, then decided to study radio telegraphy at Varignano Technical School, a port location near La Spezia where he later became an instructor. He participated as a radio-telegraph operator in the First World War, where he took the nickname Baciccia. After the war ended, he married Anita Bucilli, and they had a son named Giorgio.

In 1928 he participated in airship Italia polar expedition led by Nobile. On 24 May 1928 the airship crashed while flying back from the North Pole.

After the crash Biagi repeatedly sent the SOS signal to the support ship Città di Milano, using small shortwave transmitter Ondina 33 S. Separate device, Burndept MK IV, was used as receiver. Though the signal was not received by the support ship, it was caught at a distance of 2,400 km by Russian radio amateur Nikolaj Schmidt (ru). Schmidt reported it to the authorities, who then informed Radio San Paolo in Rome. Large scale rescue operations followed, and finally Soviet ice-breaker Krassin saved Biagi and the others on 12 July.

Biagi continued his work as a non-commissioned officer of the Navy, and then retired. In the last few years of life he opened a petrol station on the Via Ostiense, on the outskirts of Rome.
