= Einar Lundborg =

Swedish aviator

Einar Paul Albert Muni Lundborg
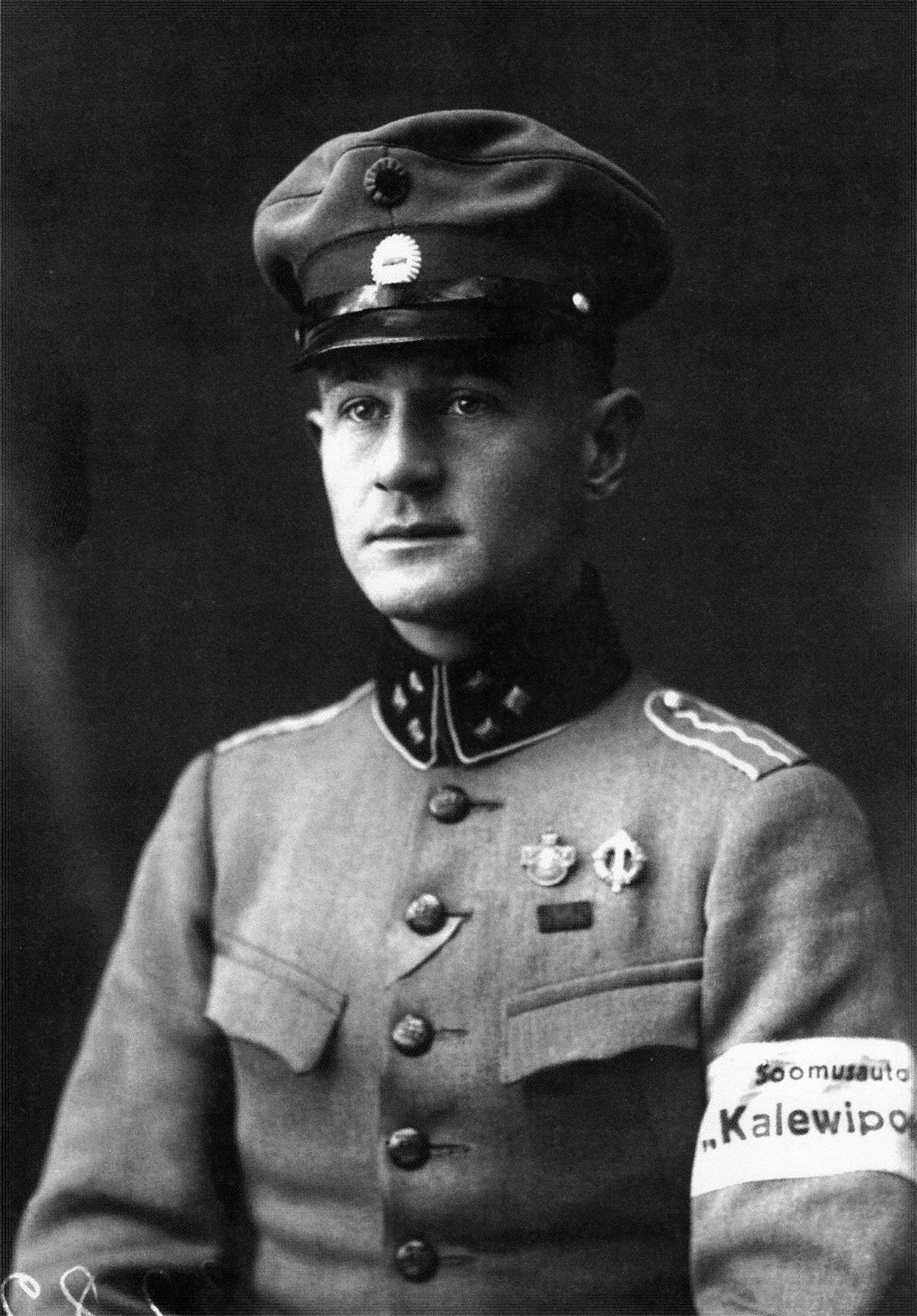
- Einar Lundborg during the Estonian War of Independence as the commander of armored car "Kalevipoeg".
- Born: 5 April 1896; Calcutta, India
- Died: 27 January 1931 (aged 34); Malmslätt, Sweden
- Burial place: Linköping, Sweden
- Military career
- Service years: 1914–1931
- Rank: Captain
- Conflicts: Finnish Civil War; Estonian War of Independence
- Awards: Cross of Liberty (Estonia); Order of the Cross of Liberty; Order of the White Rose; Order of St. Vladimir; Order of St. Anna; Iron Cross

Einar Paul Albert Muni Lundborg (5 April 1896 – 27 January 1931) was a Swedish aviator.

== Biography ==
He was born on 5 April 1896.

In 1928 he rescued Italian explorer Umberto Nobile after Nobile's airship crashed on the ice north of Spitsbergen. He was later promoted to captain in the Swedish Air Force.

Before joining the air force, Lundborg participated in the Finnish Civil War in 1918 and in the Estonian War of Independence in 1919–1920.

Lundborg was killed during a test flight of the Jaktfalken airplane at Malmslätt in 1931. He was survived by his wife Margareta, née Malmberg (1900–1981). He is buried in Linköping, Sweden.

== Honours and awards ==
Estonian War of Independence

- Cross of Liberty 3rd class II phase (August 17, 1920)
- Estonia's war memorial

Finnish War

- Cross of Liberty Class III with Swords and Class IV with Swords (Finland)
- Order of the White Rose of Finland, Commander 2nd class
- Finnish gallantry medal, Phase II
- Swedish Brigadier gallantry medal
- Medal of Tampere

Russian Army in the Northwest

- Order of St. Vladimir, 4th class with Swords
- Order of St. Anna, 3rd class with Swords

German Army

- Iron Cross, I and II Classes

== Bibliography ==
- När Nobile Räddades: Mina Upplevelser Under Den Svenska Spetsbergs Expeditionen 1928 (published in 1928 in Swedish) - Title in English: 'When Nobile Was Rescued: My Experiences During The Swedish Spetsbergs Expedition 1928'. The publication includes a fold-out map of Spitsbergen.
- Pier Paolo Alfei,‘None of Us Had Ever Seen the Midnight Sun Before’: History of the First Swedish Air Force Mission in the Arctic (1928)', Journal of History 2025, vol.60, no.2, 89-109, https://doi.org/10.3138/jh-2025-0002
