= Johan Kjeldsen =

Norwegian skipper

Johan Kiil Kjeldsen
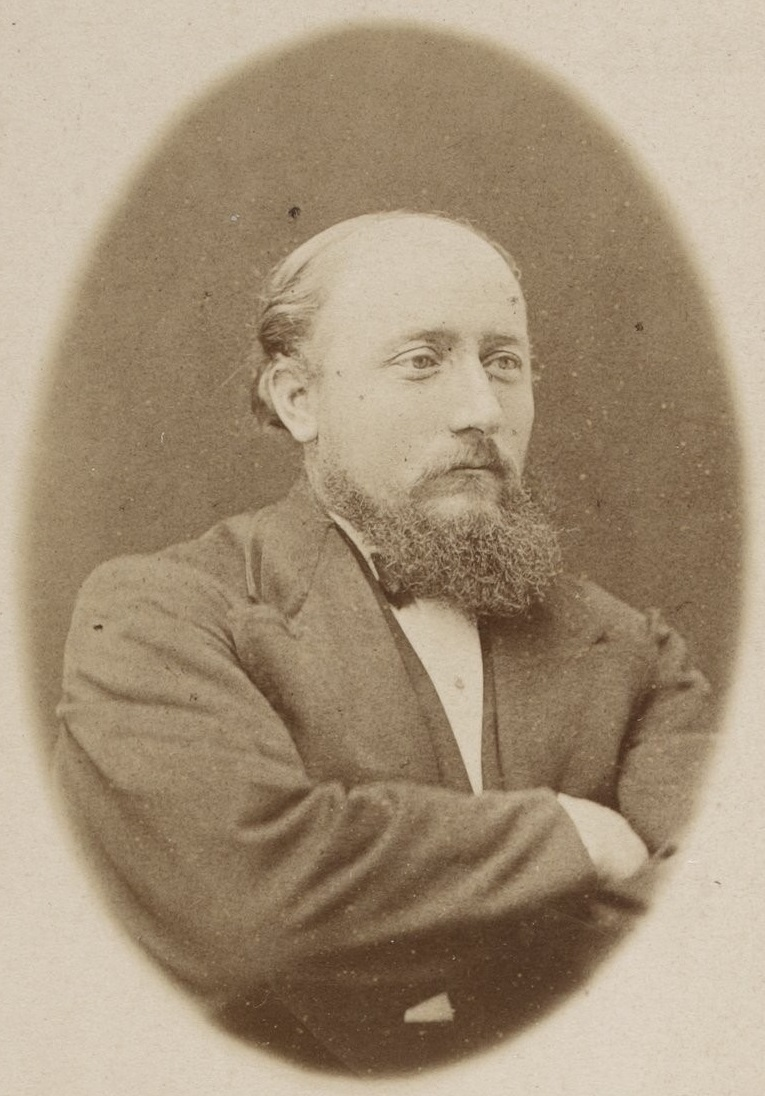
- Johan Kjeldsen, ca. 1883
- Born: 20 July 1840; Tromsø, Norway
- Died: 15 April 1909 (aged 68); Tromsø, Norway
- Occupation: skipper
- Spouses: Anna Andersen; Petrea Pauline Eidissen

Johan Kiil Kjeldsen (1840 – 1909) was a Norwegian skipper. He took part in many Arctic expeditions and is credited with the discovery of Kvitøya.

== Early life ==
Kjeldsen was born in the village of Bakkejord on Kvaløya. He went on his first Arctic voyage in 1856.

== Master of Isbjørnen ==
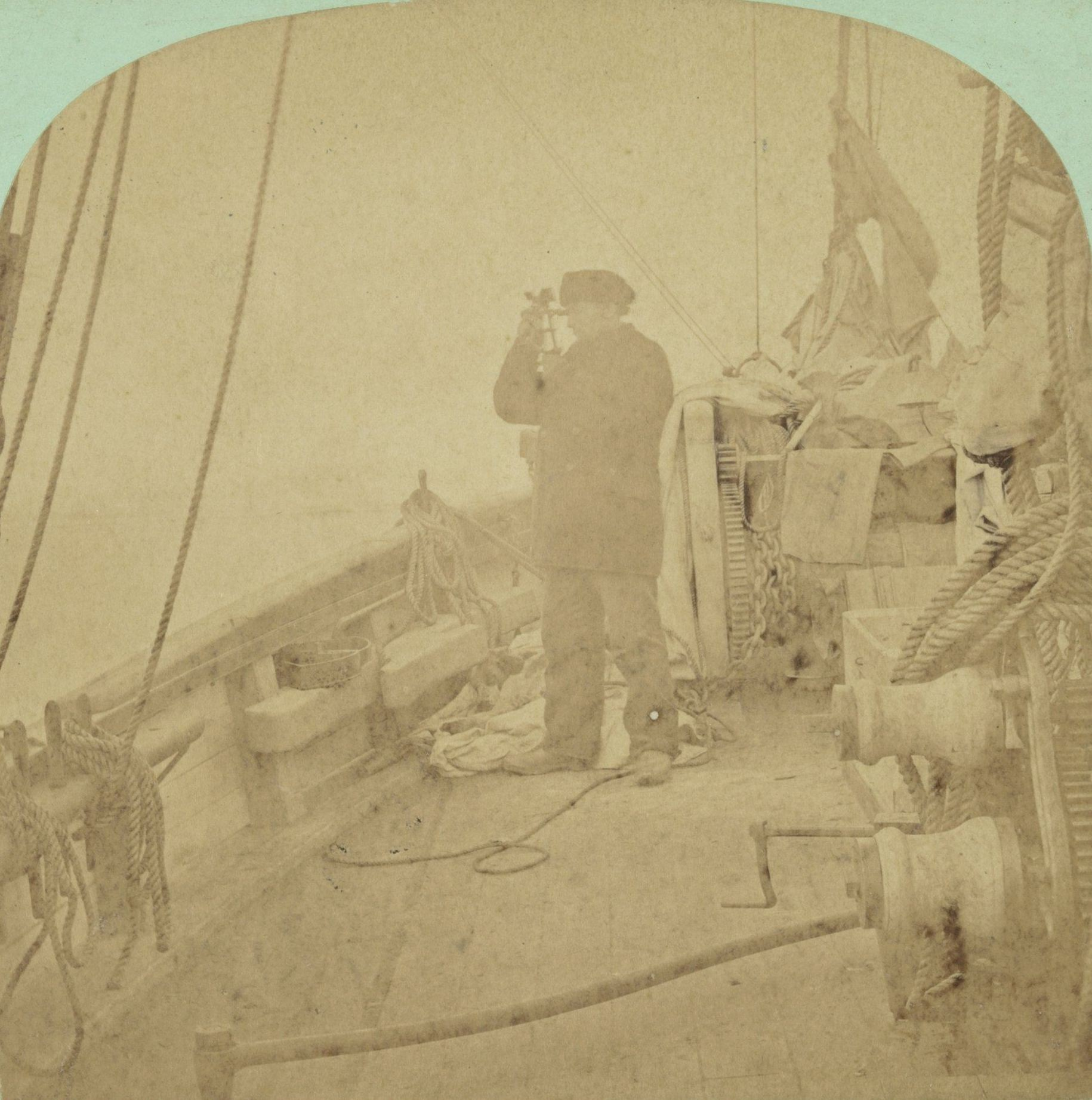
Kjeldsen on board the Isbjörn makes observations

In 1871, he served as captain of the sloop Isbjørn for Karl Weyprecht and Julius Payer on an expedition to probe the area between Svalbard and Novaya Zemlya for navigability. They first attempted to reach Gillis Land from the east coast of Svalbard. Gillis Land had been sighted by Dutchman Cornelis Giles in 1707, but had proven elusive since. Many supposed that it was a fairly large landmass. Kjeldsen and the Norwegian crew were opposed to this route, as they knew from experience that the ice conditions in that area were typically bad. This view was proven correct when the ship was unable to advance and damaged by ice. Having no success here, Isbjørn sailed east and managed to push far into the Barents Sea. Weyprecht was not impressed by Kjeldsen and the Norwegian crew, he thought they were not sufficiently committed.

Nevertheless, due to the favourable ice conditions encountered north of Novaya Zemlya, Weyprecht and Payer were able to launch the Austro-Hungarian North Pole expedition the following year, which attempted a crossing of the North-East Passage in the steam ship Tegetthoff. In preparation for that expedition, Kjeldsen and Isbjørn were employed by expedition sponsor Count Wilczek to lay a cache at Cape Nassau on Novaya Zemlya, in case Tegetthoff should be forced to return this way. On their way to Cape Nassau, Isbjørn met with Tegetthoff as had been hoped. Due to heavy sea ice, the depot was laid on the northern of the Barents Islands instead. Members from both ships helped place coal for refueling, 1120 kg of bread, and 560 kg of instant pea soup in a crevice sealed with rocks. In 1874, the Tegetthoff expedition members did end up having to retreat to Novaya Zemlya after their ship was crushed in the ice, but after accidentally rowing past the depot, they decided to continue and rely on the provisions they still had.

== Further seafaring and discovery of Kvitøya ==
After that, Kjeldsen sailed for some years as a sealing master. In 1876, he solved the mystery of Gillis Land, when he discovered Kvitøya at 80°10′N 32°30′E.

In 1881, he was one of the ice masters on the steamer Pallas, the first commercial tourist cruise to Spitsbergen. In 1882, he worked as ice master for the Austro-Hungarian expedition to Jan Mayen as part of the first International Polar Year. He was ice master for Nils Gustaf Ekholm's expedition to Spitsbergen in 1883. Ten years later, he had the same role on a Russian expedition to the mouth of the Yenisey under the command of Leonid Dobrotvorskiy. In 1896 and 1897, he was captain on Henry Pearson's expeditions to the Russian Arctic.

He was living in Tromsø with his wife, Anna Kjeldsen from Trondheim, and their foster daughter Anna Knutzen, also born in Trondheim.

== Master of Frithjof ==
In 1898, Kjeldsen dropped off Walter Wellman and his expedition at Franz Josef Land as master of the barque Frithjof.

The following year, he brought an expedition led by Gustaf Kolthoff to Greenland. During the voyage, a fire broke out in the engine room and Kjeldsen was nearly asphyxiated as he came into the room.

In 1901, Frithjof under the command of Kjeldsen acted as a supply ship for the Baldwin-Ziegler Polar Expedition. Frithjof was to meet the main expedition ship America in Franz Josef Land, but their meeting was delayed due to a misunderstanding. A row broke out between Kjeldsen and expedition leader Evelyn Briggs Baldwin as to who was to blame. After his speedy return, Kjeldsen led the relief expedition for Søren Zachariassen, a fellow Norwegian captain who had not returned from a trip to Svalbard in the smack Petrell. The rescue mission was funded by the Norwegian government. Kjeldsen sailed from Tromsø aboard Frithjof in November. In heavy storms, water entered the engine room through an aperture at the boiler, where bolts had sprung loose. The pumps stopped and had to be repaired. Kjeldsen decided to continue trying despite the harsh weather. Arriving in Svalbard, they were forced to wrap the anchor winch in paraffin soaked cloth and set it on fire because it was frozen stiff. They found Zachariassen and his two companions, who had been shipwrecked at Advent Bay. Having rescued the freezing men, Kjeldsen sailed back to Norway. For his bravery, Kjeldsen later received the Medal for Heroic Deeds.

In 1902, Kjeldsen attempted to sail Frithjof to Franz Josef Land to meet America again. This failed on account of the sea ice. America returned to Norway on her own however. Baldwin was sacked by expedition sponsor William Ziegler. But another attempt would be made the following year with Anthony Fiala in charge. For the Ziegler-Fiala expedition, America was repaired first in Tromsø, then in Trondheim. When Kjeldsen inspected the ship and saw very little progress and a constantly drunk engineer, he expressed being weary of working for the American expedition.

In 1903, Kjeldsen, in command of the ship Laura, was tasked with inspecting Baldwin's supply depots in Greenland that Fiala hoped to use on a return trip from the North Pole. The following year, Kjeldsen again attempted to relieve the Americans in Franz Josef Land with Frithjof, but could not reach it.

== Later expeditions ==
As Frithjof was damaged in the process, a new attempt was started with the Terra Nova the following year. This time Kjeldsen reached Franz Josef Land and rescued the expedition that had been shipwrecked.

In 1906, Kjeldsen was ice master on the Isle de France, the following year on Princess Alice for Albert I, Prince of Monaco. In 1908 he was ice master on Kong Harald. He died in 1909.
