= Wilczek Land =

Island in the Arctic Ocean

Native name: Земля Вильчека
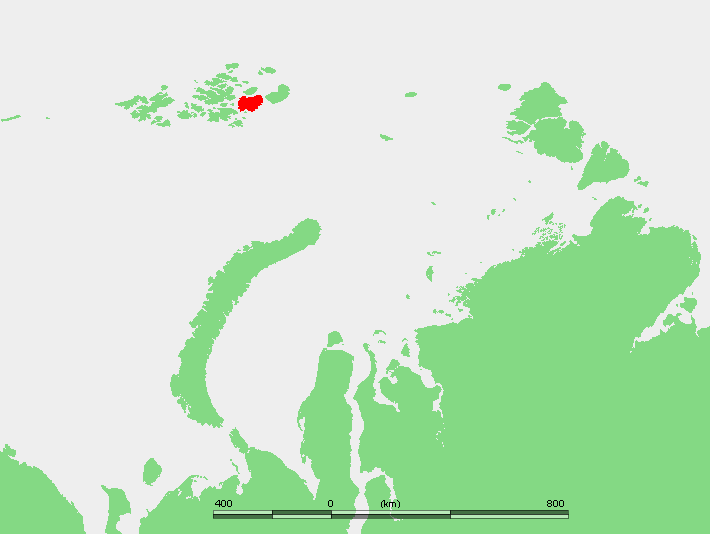
- Location of Wilczek Land in Franz Josef Land

- Location within Russia

Geography
- Location: Arctic Ocean
- Coordinates: 80.58°N 60.5°E
- Archipelago: Franz Josef Land
- Area: 2,000 km^{2} (770 sq mi)
- Highest elevation: 606 m (1988 ft)
- Highest point: Wüllerstorf Mountains

Administration
- Russia
- Oblast: Arkhangelsk Oblast

Wilczek Land (Russian: Земля Вильчека; Zemlya Vil'cheka, German: Wilczek-Land), is an island in the Arctic Ocean at 80.58°N 60.5°E. At 2,000 km^{2} (770 sq mi) it is the second-largest island in Franz Josef Land, in Arctic Russia.

This island should not be confused with the small Wilczek Island, "Остров Вильчека", located south-west of Salm Island, also in the Franz Josef group and named after the same person.

== History ==
The second largest island (after Zemlya Georga) in the Franz Josef Land archipelago is named after Austro-Hungarian Count Johann Nepomuk Wilczek. Although he himself never visited the archipelago, Count Hans Wilczek was the most important sponsor of the Austro-Hungarian North Pole Expedition to Franz Josef Land that discovered the island in 1873.

Cape Heller (Mys Geller) (80°46′N 59°36′E) was the wintering site for two Norwegians, Paul Bjørvig and Bernt Bentsen, members of the 1898–99 Wellman Expedition, while their team led by Walter Wellman stayed in the main camp at Cape Tegetthoff on Hall Island to the south. Bentsen died during the winter, and Bjørvig kept the dead body of his friend in their joint sleeping bag for 55 days, until the rest of the team came to his rescue.

== Geography ==
Wilczek Land is the second largest island of the Franz Josef Archipelago, at 2203 km^{2}. It is almost completely glacierized except for two narrow areas along its western shores. The highest point on the island is 606 metres (1,988 feet).

Cape Ganza (Mys Ganza) is Wilczek Land's westernmost cape. The channel to the west, between Wilczek Land and Gallya, is known as Avstriyskyy Proliv (Австрийский пролив).

=== Glaciers and ice domes ===
The Kupol Arktirazvedki (Купол Арктиразведки) ice dome covers the northeastern part of the island. On the western side of the Arktirazvedki ice dome there are two glaciers, the Stremitelny Glacier (Lednik Stremitel’nyy) "Rushing Glacier", and the Molochny Glacier (Lednik Molochnyy) "Milky Glacier" to its west, both having their terminus on the northern shore.

Further to the south the Kupol Tindalya (Купол Тиндаля) ice dome, named after Irish glaciologist John Tyndall, covers the eastern central area of the island. To the southwest of it flows the Znamenity Glacier (Lednik Znamenityy), which has its terminus on the southern coast, east of the "Cloudy Dome" Kupol Oblachnyy (Купол Облачный) ice dome at the southern end of the island.

=== Adjacent minor islands ===
- Off Wilczek Land's southern bay lies a small island called Klagenfurt Island (Остров Клагенфурт) about 9 kilometres (6 miles) from the shore. This island is named after Klagenfurt, the capital of Carinthia.
- Immediately off Wilczek Land's eastern coast lie two small islets called Ostrova Gorbunova (Острова Горбунова); they are at (80°34′N 62°01′E). These islets were named after Russian naturalist Gregory Petrovich Gorbunov.
- 1.5 km off Wilczek Land's southeastern cape lie four islets in a row named (from NE to SW):
  - Ostrov Derevyannyy (Остров Деревянный). This island was initially named Tree Island by Wellman, after judge Lambert Tree who had donated 150 $ to the expedition. The current name is presumably from a literal translation into Russian under the false assumption that the island's name was derived from trees.
  - Ostrov Daues (Остров Дауэс), Dawes Island or Davis Island, named after U.S. Comptroller of the Currency Charles G. Dawes who had donated 100 $ to the Wellman expedition.
  - Ostrov Mak-Nul'ta (Остров Мак-Нульта). The island is probably named after politician John McNulta.
  - Ostrov Tillo (Остров Тилло), named after Ukrainian cartographer Oleksiy Tillo. This island should not be confused with Tillo Island in the Kara Sea.

== See also ==
- List of islands of Russia
- List of glaciers of Russia

== Bibliography ==
- Clements R. Markham, The Lands of Silence
