= Johann Nepomuk Wilczek =

Austrian explorer (1837–1922)

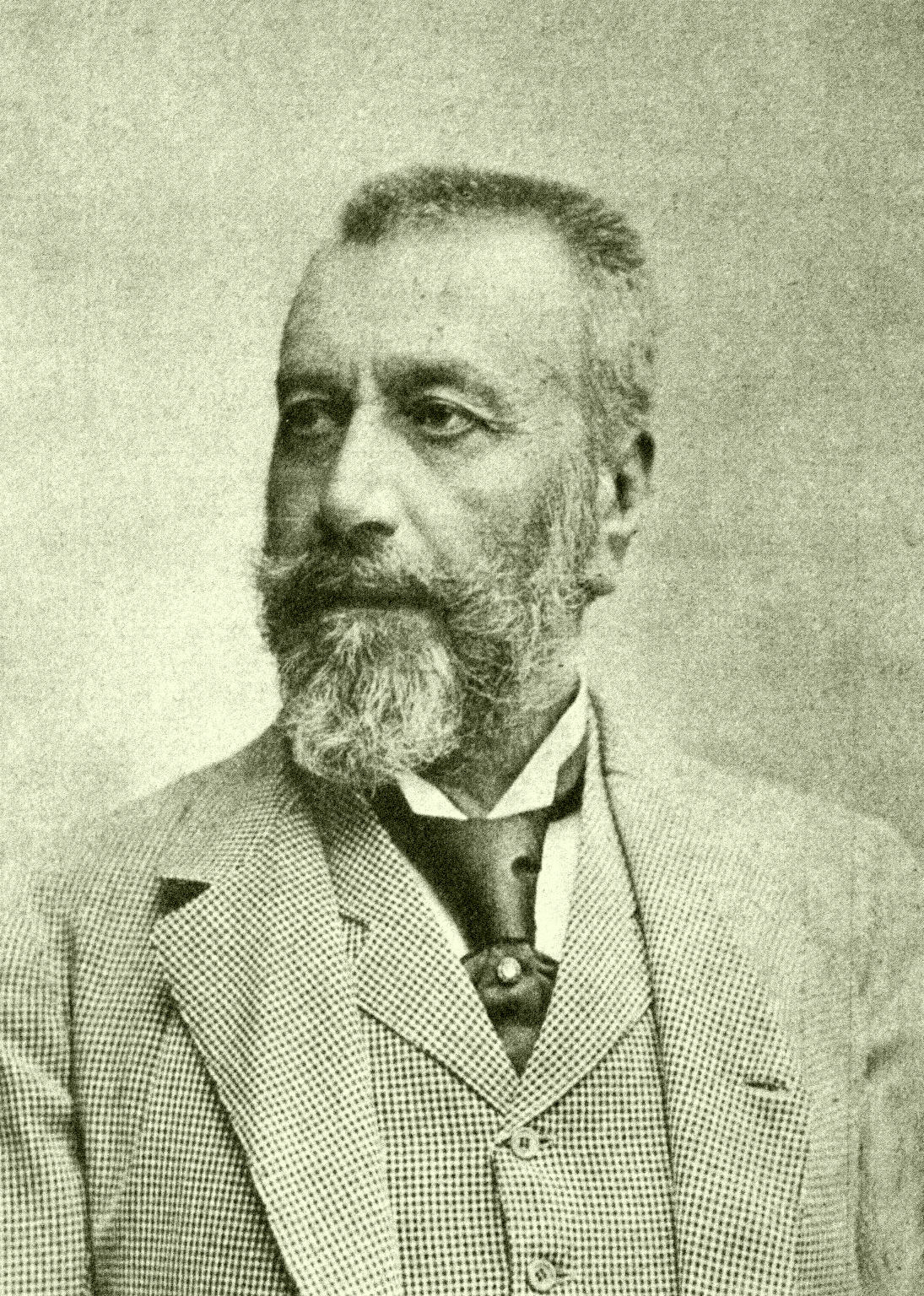
- Photo by Carl Pietzner, around 1907
- Born: 7 December 1837; Vienna, Austrian Empire
- Died: 27 January 1922 (aged 84); Vienna, Austria
- Occupation: Explorer
- Known for: Sponsorship of the Austro-Hungarian North Pole Expedition

Johann Nepomuk Wilczek (German: Hans Graf Wilczek; 7 December 1837 – 27 January 1922), known to friends as "Hans Wilczek", was an Austrian arctic explorer and patron of the arts. He was the main sponsor of the Austro-Hungarian North Pole Expedition in 1872–74.

== Life ==
Born in Vienna, he was the son of a Polish count, Stanislaus Joseph von Wilczek (1792–1847), and Baroness Gabriele von Reischach (1802–1890). Being from a well-off noble family, young Hans Wilczek made intensive travels and studied archaeology, art history as well as natural sciences. In 1858, he married Countess Emma Maria Emo-Capodilista (1833–1924), a court lady of Archduchess Sophie. He travelled to Russia in 1863, including Crimea and the Caucasus. Then, in 1866, he enlisted in the Austro-Prussian War as a volunteer. Between 1868 and 1870 he travelled across Africa.

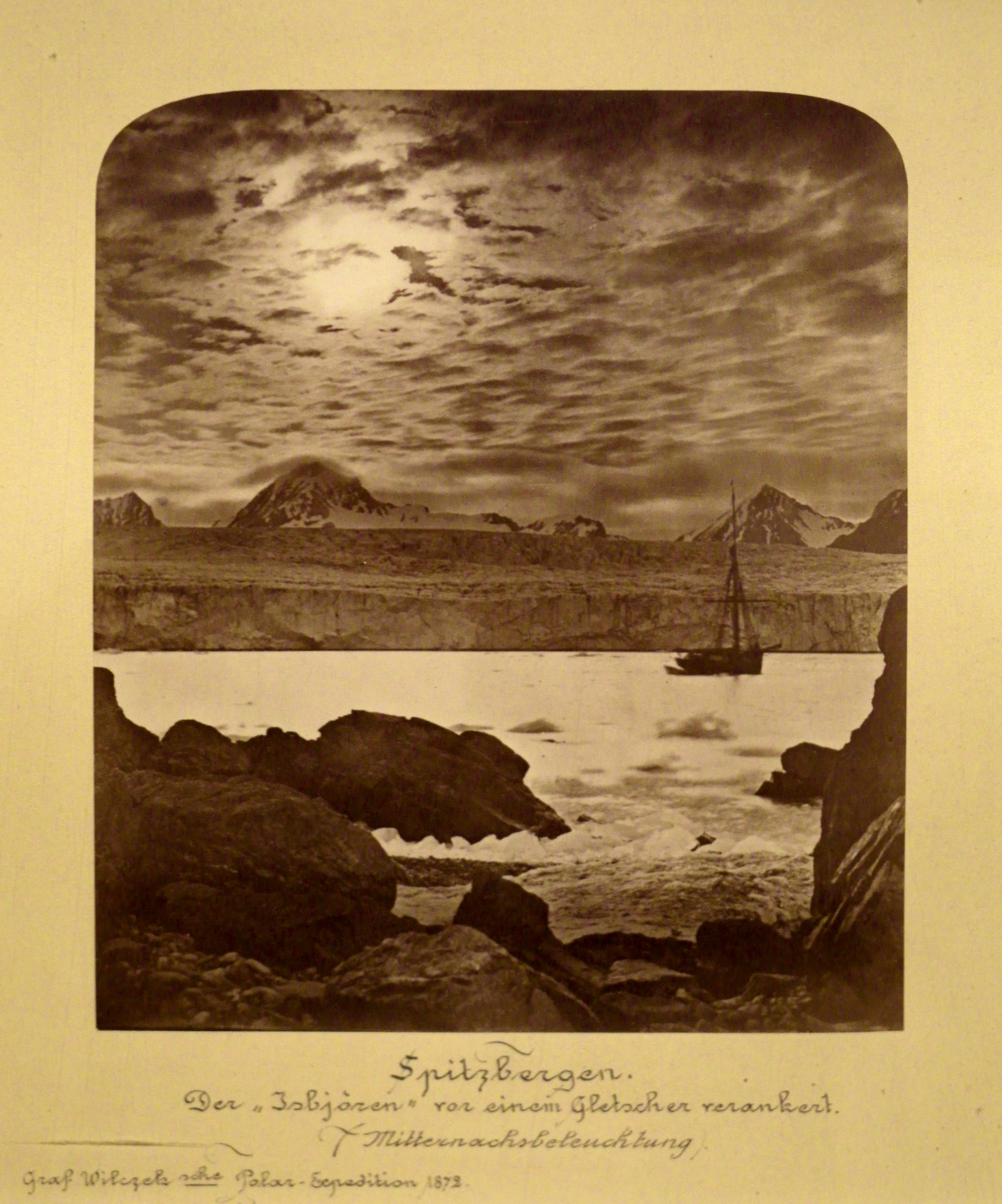
Sailing boat Isbjørn anchored in front of a glacier in Spitsbergen, 1872.

From 1872 to 1874, he provided for the S/X Admiral Tegetthoff research vessel and elaborate preparations of the Austro-Hungarian North Pole Expedition, led by Julius Payer and Karl Weyprecht from 1872 to 1874. Of the donors to the expedition, he contributed the largest amount. In 1872, Wilczek himself led a preliminary expedition to Novaya Zemlya in order to set up a depot. For this he chartered the schooner Isbjørn, which had already been employed by Weyprecht and Payer for a reconnaissance trip in 1871, and hired Johan Kjeldsen as captain. Baron Maximilian von Sterneck was in charge of nautical affairs. Professor Hans Höfer von Heimhalt accompanied them in the capacity of geologist. Wilhelm J. Burger was the expedition's photographer. Leaving Tromsø on 20 June 1872, the Isbjørn sailed first to Spitsbergen, then to Novaya Zemlya. From Matochkin Strait, some excursions were made onto the land. Continuing their journey north, Isbjørn met with Tegetthoff as had been hoped. In a joint effort, the depot was laid on the northern of the Barents Islands. Coal for refueling, 2000 lb (1120 kg) of bread, and 1000 lb (560 kg) of instant pea soup were placed in a crevice sealed with rocks. Having established this precaution for Tegetthoff's return from the Arctic, Isbjørn then sailed to the mouth of the Pechora River, where Wilczek and his companions disembarked on 31 August 1872 and returned to Austria on land. In 1873, the crew of the Tegetthoff discovered the Franz Josef Land archipelago and named Wilczek Land and Wilczek Island in his honour.

In 1872, Wilczek was elected an honorary member of the Austrian Geographical Society. There he promoted the construction of weather stations in the Arctic. The Austrian polar station on Jan Mayen Island was built and equipped in 1882 fully at his own costs. From 1882 until 1889, he held the title of President of the Austrian Geographical Society. In 1890, he was given the title of Honorary President.

Count Wilczek was a member of the Austrian House of Lords since its creation in 1861 until 1918. As a promoter of the fine arts, he was the founder of the "Viennese Society of Art Lovers" (Gesellschaft der Wiener Kunstfreunde). He also backed the equipment of the Vienna Museum of Military History as a member of the board of trustees. From 1874 to 1906, he had Kreuzenstein Castle reconstructed according to plans designed by architect Carl Gangolf Kayser. This monumental mansion north of Vienna is now a museum that houses his extensive art collections. In 1886, Wilczek purchased Moosham Castle in the Salzburg Lungau region.

Count Wilczek died in Vienna. He is buried in the family crypt in the Kreuzenstein castle chapel. The reigning Prince Hans-Adam II of Liechtenstein is his great-great-grandson.
