= Wilczek Island =

Island in the Franz Josef Land, Arkhangelsk Oblast, Russia

Wilczek Island Остров Вильчека
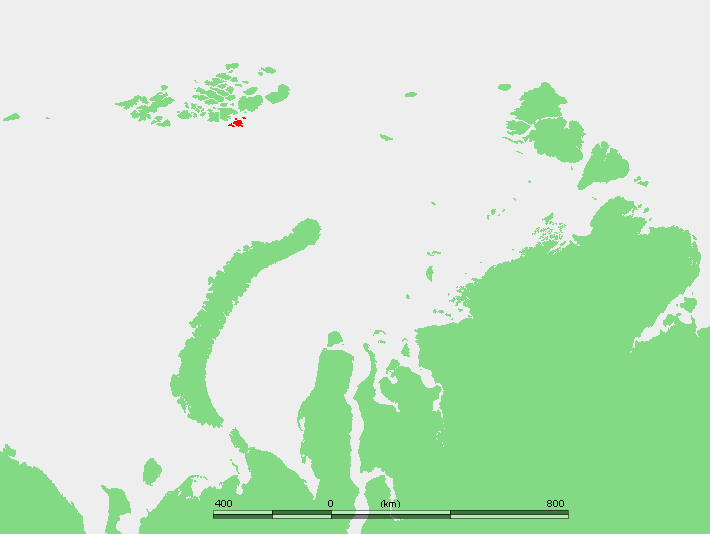
- Location of Wilczek Island and its neighboring islands in the Franz Josef Archipelago

- Location within Russia

Geography
- Location: Arctic Ocean
- Coordinates: 79°53′N 58°45′E
- Archipelago: Franz Josef Land
- Area: 50 km^{2} (19 sq mi)
- Length: 10 km (6 mi)
- Highest elevation: 187 m (614 ft)

Administration
- Russian Federation
- Arkhangelsk Oblast

Wilczek Island, (Остров Вильчека; Ostrov Vil'cheka) is located in the southeastern end of Franz Josef Land, Arkhangelsk Oblast, Russia.

== History ==
Wilczek Island was the first island of the Franz Josef Archipelago on which the Austro-Hungarian North Pole Expedition set foot on November 1, 1873. A grave was dug ashore for Otto Krisch, a deceased member of the expedition and a cairn was erected with a message in a sealed container in it informing about the new discovery.

On August 5, 1991, German ship Dagmar Aaen with the Arved Fuchs expedition reached Wilczek Island. Fuchs dug up the Austro-Hungarian expedition bottle from among the stones in the cairn, but the writing inside could not be read. The document was brought to the office the Federal Criminal Police Office in Wiesbaden. There the writing was deciphered and it was confirmed that it was a note from Polar explorers Julius Payer and Karl Weyprecht. The document is now in the German Naval Museum in Bremerhaven.

== Geography ==
Wilczek Island is a 10 km (6 mi) long island southwest of Salm Island, separated from the latter by a 3 km (2 mi) wide sound. The island is mostly unglacierized, except for a small ice cap in the north and a smaller one in the south.

"Wilczek Island" should not be confused with much larger Wilczek Land located in the same archipelago, but they are both named after Austro-Hungarian Count Johann Nepomuk Wilczek. Count Hans Wilczek was the most important sponsor of the Austro-Hungarian North Pole Expedition to Franz Josef Land.

=== Adjacent islands ===
==== Lamont Island ====
12 km south of Wilczek Island lies Lamont Island (остров Ламон) 79° 48' N; 58° 40' E. This is a small double island, only 1.3 km in length. Lamont Island is the southernmost island of the Franz Josef Archipelago. In some maps it appears as Lamon Island.

This double islet was named after Scottish Arctic explorer Sir James Lamont.

== See also ==
- List of islands of Russia
