= Ziegler Polar Expedition =

Failed polar expedition, 1903–1905

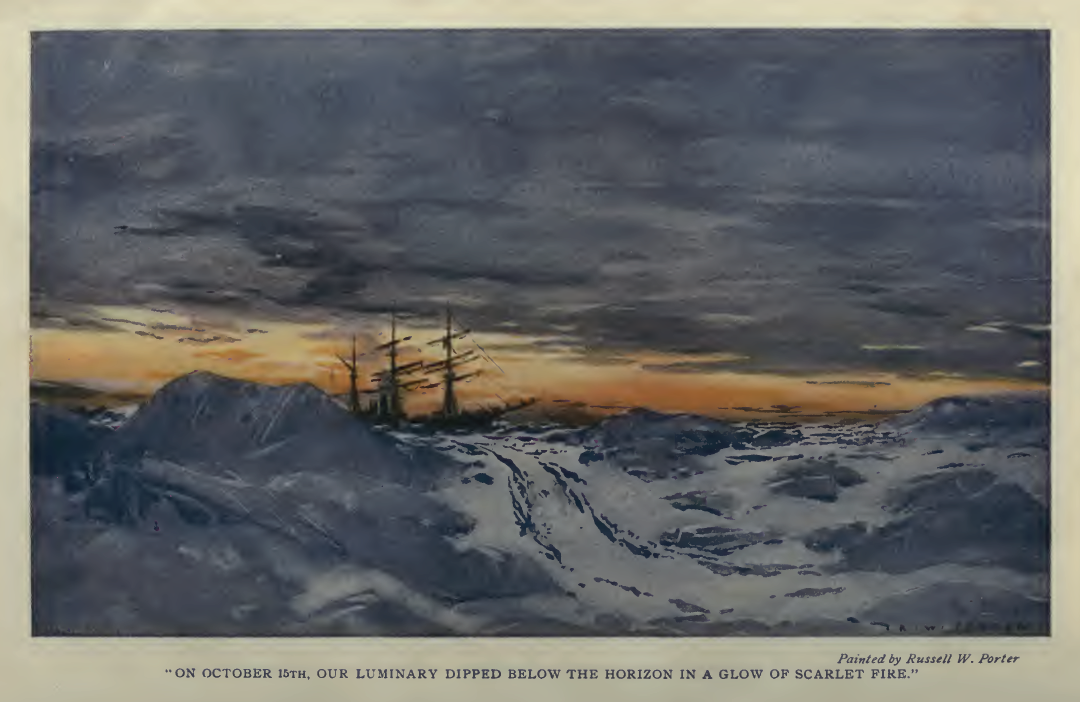
The Ziegler expedition

The Ziegler polar expedition of 1903–1905, also known as the Fiala expedition, was a failed attempt to reach the North Pole. The expedition party remained stranded north of the Arctic Circle for two years before being rescued, yet all but one of its members survived. The expedition is so named as it was funded by industrialist William Ziegler and led by explorer Anthony Fiala.

== Planning ==
In the previous two years Ziegler had funded the 1901-1902 Baldwin-Ziegler Polar Expedition, but was dissatisfied with the results achieved by expedition leader Evelyn Briggs Baldwin. He selected Anthony Fiala, who was a photographer on the previous mission, to lead the second expedition. He was to renew the efforts to reach the pole with dog sledges from Franz Josef Land where plenty of Baldwin's provisions were still stored in depots. The 35 expedition members included many from the previous expedition. Ziegler chose William Peters as second-in-command. Fiala calculated that the food requirements of an eight dog team and driver would be at least 1100 pounds. This presented an issue, as the maximum sled load capacity was 600 pounds. He planned to use ponies to carry the extra supplies, and to feed the dogs on horse meat when the supplies dwindled.

== Arrival ==
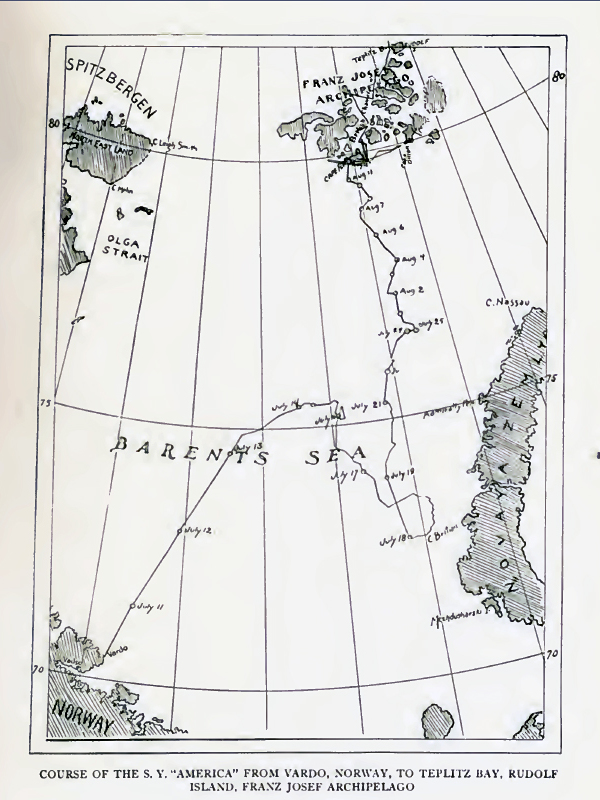
The course of the America, 1903

After a refit of the expedition ship America in Trondheim, Norway, and picking up dogs, ponies, and furs in Arkhangelsk, Russia, the three-masted steamship finally departed for Franz Josef Land from Vardø, Norway, on July 10, 1903. The expedition reached Cape Flora, on the southern edge of Franz Josef Land, on August 12.

Captain Edwin Coffin navigated through the archipelago, past Rudolf Island in the very north, and up to the pack ice at 82° 13' 50" N, a new record for the farthest north of a steam ship under its own power.

The ship then returned to Teplitz Bay at Rudolf Island, where the expedition started setting up their winter quarters on 31 August. The place was called "Camp Abruzzi" after Prince Luigi Amedeo, Duke of the Abruzzi, who had wintered at the same place 4 years earlier. The expedition erected an observatory, an outhouse made from empty supply boxes, a large tent housing the ponies, dogs, and supplies, and a one-story hut with a living room and several bedrooms. Against the will of the captain, Fiala ordered the America to be berthed at the fairly exposed Teplitz Bay too, rather than in a safer position further south. In addition to America's cargo, the expedition was able to salvage supplies left behind by Abruzzi and those left by the Baldwin-Ziegler expedition at Cape Auk, just to south across Teplitz Bay.

On October 22, the lines by which the America had been fastened to the shore snapped in a storm, sending the ship adrift during the polar night. After two days and with the help of light signals, the men that were on board were able to bring it back.

== Isolation and rescue ==
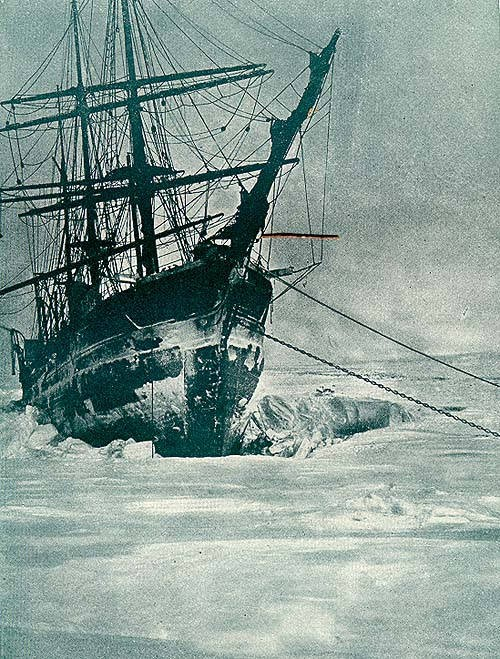
The crushed America at Teplitz Bay, 1904. Long exposure photograph taken by Fiala during the polar night.

In November 1903, when severe weather ensued, the ship was crushed by ice pushing into the bay. The cargo could initially be salvaged, but following a storm in January 1904 much of the provisions and coal disappeared with the wreck.

On March 7, Fiala led a sledge party of 27 for the first attempt at reaching the pole. They turned back four days later after several injuries had occurred and the cooking equipment was found inadequate. The second attempt with the number of members reduced to 14 was started on March 24. This group turned back two days later just off Cape Fligely, where progress was stifled by very rough ice. Two expedition members, Anton Vedoe and Russell Porter, attempted to test the conditions further north on their own, but did not get far before turning south, conducting an extensive mapping of Franz Josef Land instead.

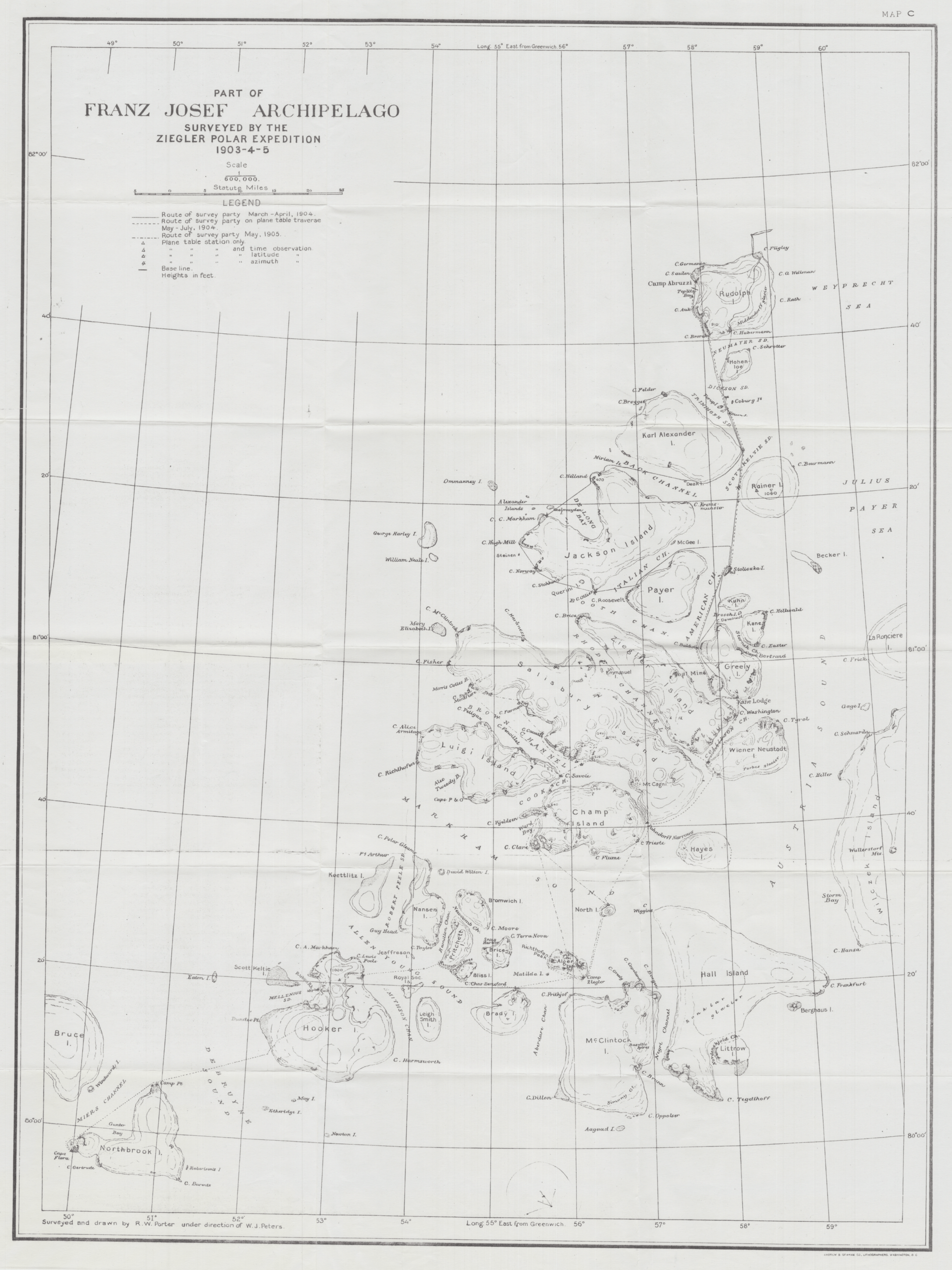
Map resulting from the surveys conducted by Russell Porter

With many men demoralized after the failed polar attempts, Fiala led 25 expedition members south on May 1. On May 16 they reached Cape Flora, where they hoped to be rescued. Russell Porter, Anton Vedoe and three other men also set out from Camp Abruzzi to Cape Flora on May 9. On the way they made further observations for the improved maps of the archipelago. Nine remained at Camp Abruzzi. They were initially to be reinforced in 1905 for a new attempt to reach the pole. On May 16, Sigurd Myhre died in Camp Abruzzi in unresolved circumstances. On July 8, three more men made their way south from Camp Abruzzi with the expedition's scientific instruments.

At Cape Flora most of the expedition were staying in the huts installed by the Jackson-Harmsworth expedition. Anton Vedoe discovered a coal seam in the hill next to Cape Flora, greatly easing the strained supply situation. While they were waiting in vain for a ship to arrive, discontent led the group to fracture into separate camps that refused to cooperate. Both Peters and Fiala with altogether five men eventually left Cape Flora and returned to Camp Abruzzi for the winter.

From there Fiala started with six others on a final poleward trip on March 17, 1905. It didn't fare better than the previous attempts and was aborted six days later. Porter carried out additional surveying work in Zichy Land while Fiala and the remaining men returned south to Alger Island.

William S. Champ, who had already tried to come to Franz Josef Land with the relief ship Frithjof the previous year, again sailed for the ice fields aboard the Terra Nova with captain Johan Kjeldsen in 1905. On July 24, he encountered thick ice, causing the crew to doubt their ability to reach their destination. However the ship reached Salm Island on July 28 and Cape Dillon the following day, where 6 expedition members were found. More members were found at Cape Flora, and the Terra Nova returned to Cape Dillon, where a sled party was organized, which brought back the crew.

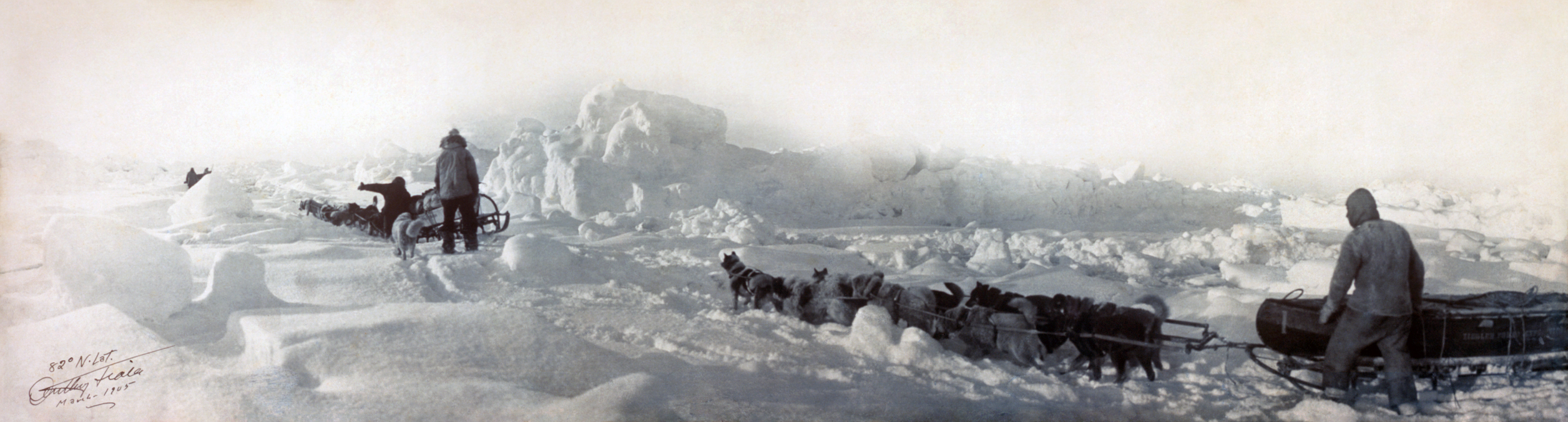
The Ziegler Polar Expedition at 82 degrees north latitude, March 1905.
