= Baldwin-Ziegler Polar Expedition =

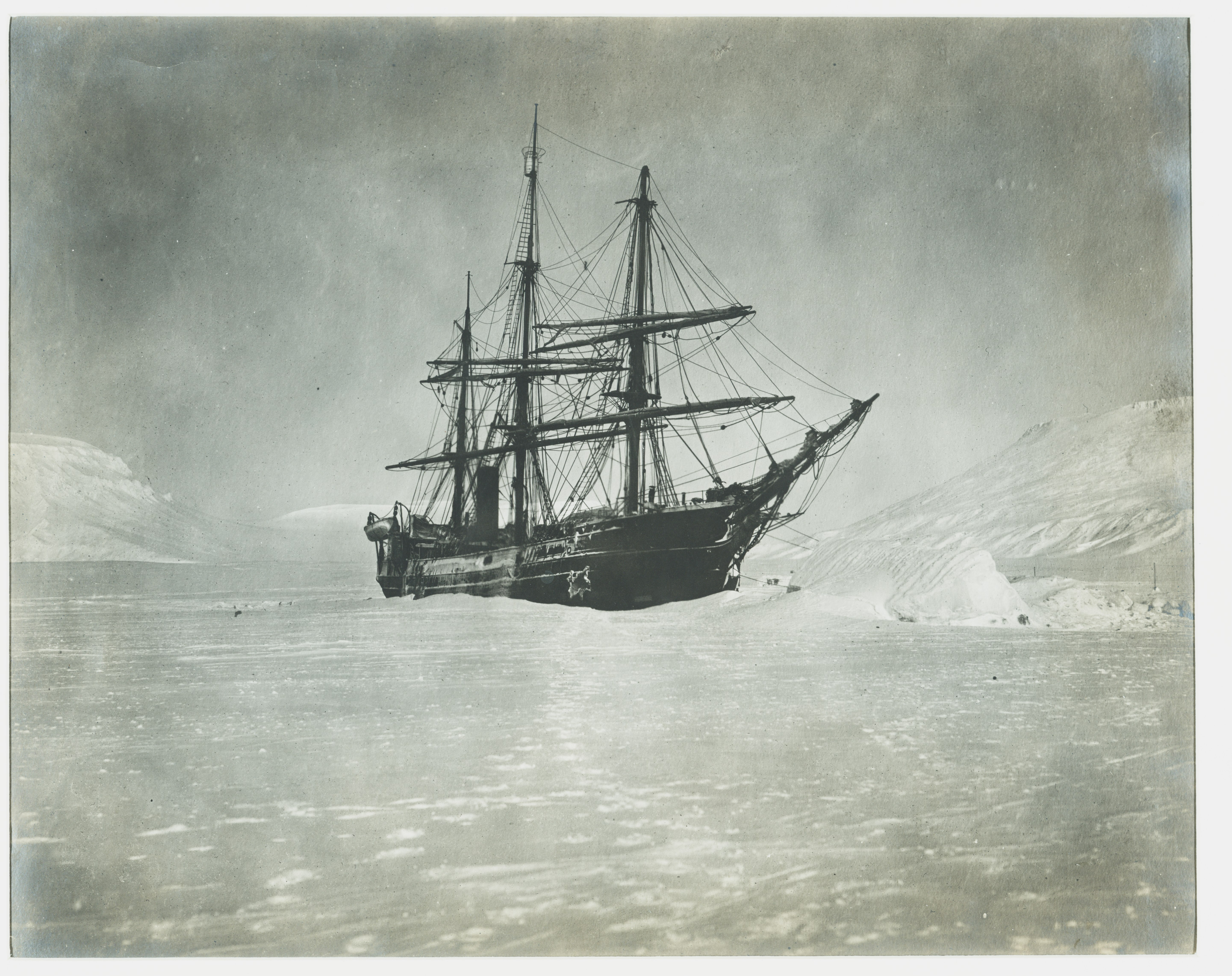
America (Christmas 1901)

The 1901-1902 Baldwin-Ziegler Polar Expedition was a failed attempt to reach the North Pole from Franz Josef Land. The expedition was led by meteorologist Evelyn Briggs Baldwin and financed by William Ziegler who had made a fortune with baking powder.

== Preparations ==
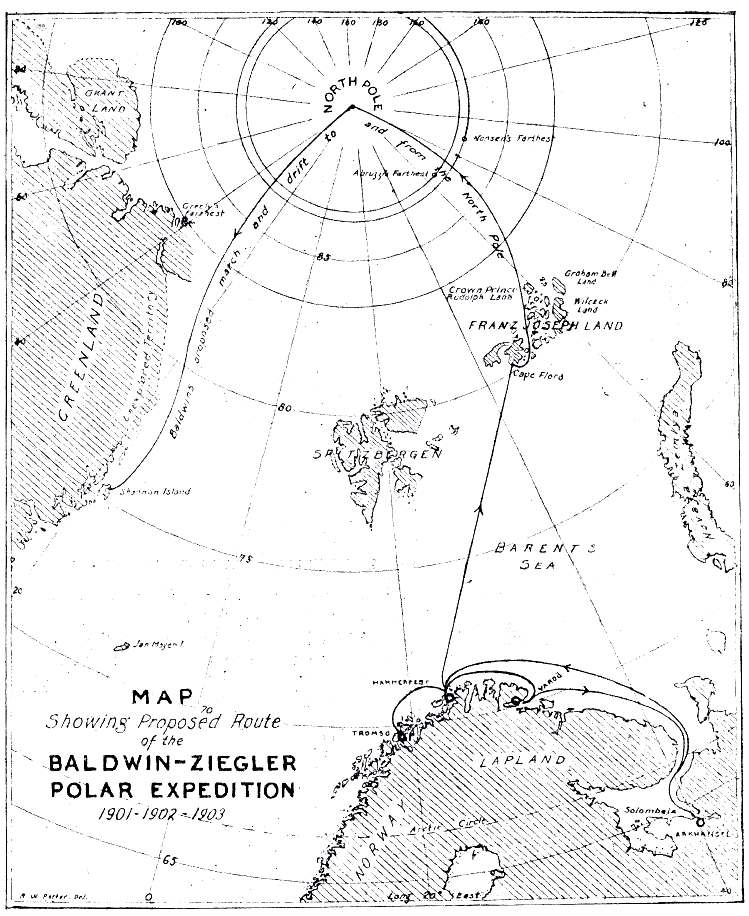
Planned route

Ziegler offered Baldwin "unlimited means" to carry out his plans, instructing him to "Find the Pole, and don't come back until you do". In the end Baldwin spent $142,000 according to his own accounts.

For this endeavour, Baldwin chartered three three-masted steam ships: The flagship was the America of 466 net tons, that was previously called Esquimaux. The 260 ton Frithjof that had been used by Walter Wellman's expedition to Franz Josef Land, in which Baldwin had also participated, functioned as supply ship. The Belgica from the Belgian Antarctic Expedition served as another support ship.

The expedition was also furnished with a small steam launch that never ended up working in the Arctic conditions. They had 15 ponies and 428 dogs at their disposal. For communication purposes, Baldwin had taken 40 balloons able to carry a string of message buoys that would be successively dropped at each surface contact, as well as a generator to create the necessary hydrogen on site from sulphuric acid and metal.

Baldwin's plan was to establish a base in the very north of Franz Josef Land where the expedition would spend the winter. From there a team was to move to the pole with dog sledges and then to return via Greenland, making use of the Arctic westward ice drift. Johan Bryde was sent with the Belgica to establish supply depots on the east coast of Greenland for the expedition's return.

== Personnel ==
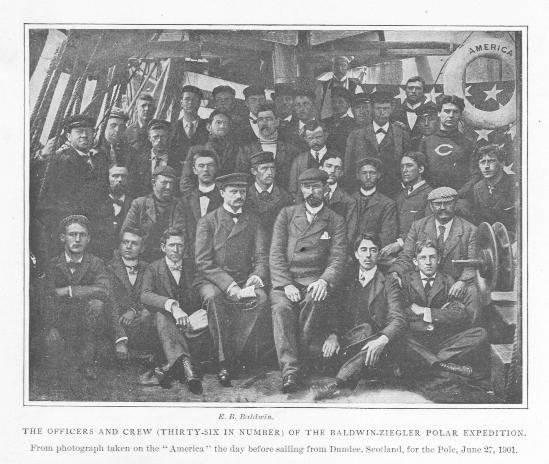
Officers and crew (1901)

The expedition members on board the America consisted of 17 Swedes, 16 Americans, 6 Russians, 1 Norwegian, and 1 Dane, 42 in total. These included:

- Evelyn Briggs Baldwin, expedition leader
- Ernest de Koven Leffingwell, physicist and geologist
- Ejnar Mikkelsen, cartographer
- Russell Porter, surveyor
- Anthony Fiala, photographer
- Francis Joseph Long, meteorologist
- Henry Hartt, engineer
- Charles Rilliet, aeronautical specialist
- Carl Johanson, sailing master
- Johan Menander, chief officer
- Ralph Bergendahl, second mate
- Magnus Arnesen, ice pilot
- William Verner, medical doctor
- Charles Seitz, medical doctor
- James DeBruler, medical doctor
- Leon Frank Barnard, expedition secretary
- Archibald Dickson, secretary to Baldwin
- Carl Sandin, translator
- Anders Hallberg, hunting expert from Falkenberg, Sweden

== Journey ==
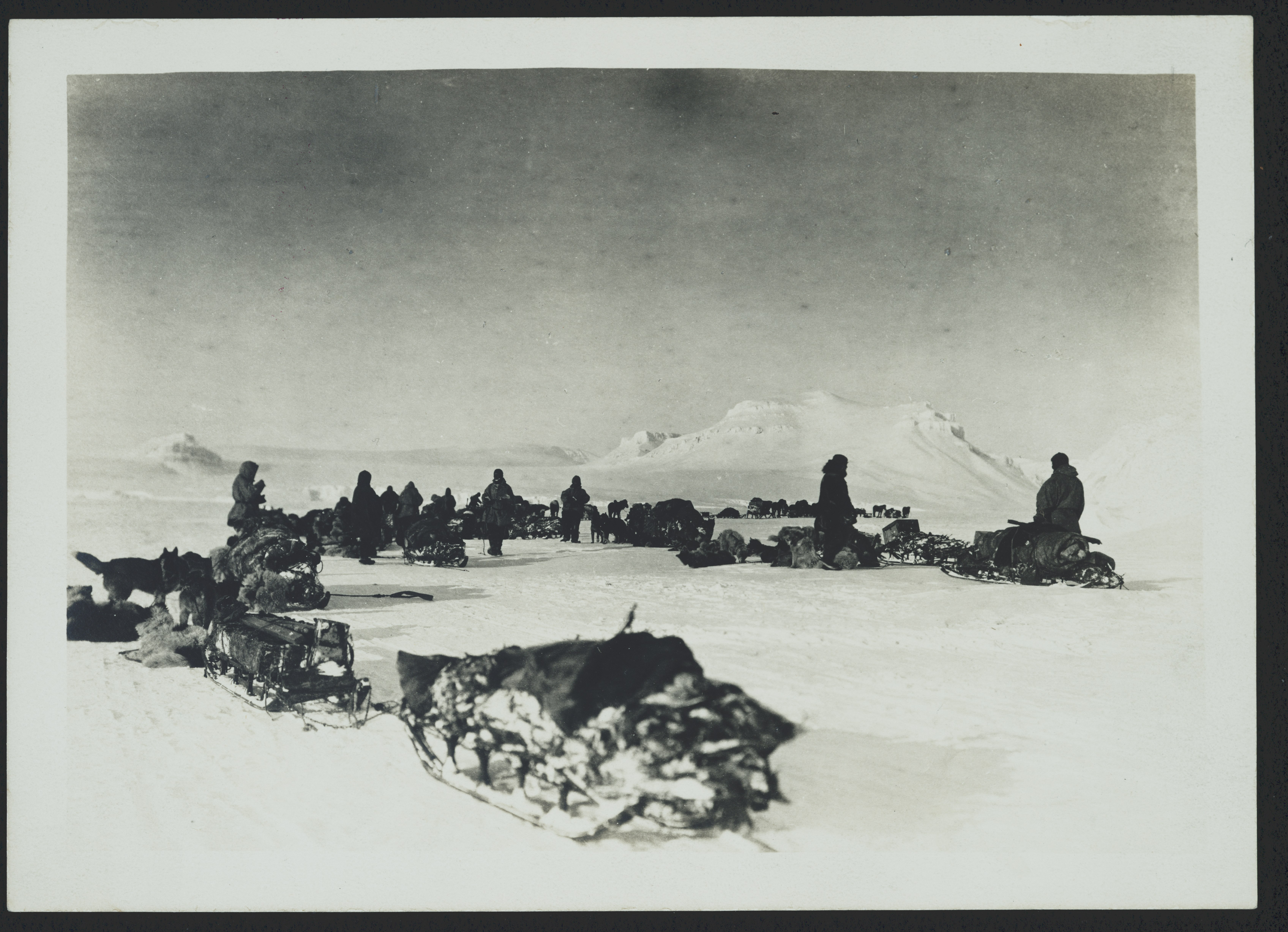
Sledge party halting in Collinson Fjord (April 1902)

America left Vardø on 27 July 1901. After meeting the Frithjof at Cape Flora, both ships were sent through the channels of the archipelago to establish a northern base camp, preferably at Rudolf Island. Sea ice however soon halted any progress. Baldwin was forced to offload on Alger Island. He named the location "Camp Ziegler".

After repeated attempts to move northwards from Camp Ziegler by ship had failed, Baldwin decided to return to Norway for the winter with the America and most of her crew, but aborted the return after a few days. The America was eventually iced in on the shore of Alger Island.

In the spring of 1902, the expedition moved their supplies northward in a series of relay depots established throughout the archipelago. The three main depots were "Kane Lodge" on Greely Island, at Coburg Island near Karl-Alexander Island, and at Cape Auk on Rudolf Island, where open water prevented further progress. Baldwin decided that the attempt to reach the North Pole be made the following year. Instead, he searched for the hut on Jackson Island where Fridtjof Nansen and Hjalmar Johansen had spent the winter of 1895/1896. He found it on 14 May. In the process, the interior of Zichy Land was explored, which led to the discovery that Ziegler Island, Champ Island, and Luigi Island are separate entities.

On Baldwin's return to Camp Ziegler, he decided to use his communication balloons to send out requests for a ship to come and supply the America with additional coal. The coal supplies were running low while the ship had to be kept under steam to avoid being damaged by ice bergs in the newly formed open water around it. 15 balloons with 300 messages were dispatched. Ultimately, the America managed to reach Honningsvåg in Norway on 1 August before any of these messages had been found.

== Reception ==
Immediately upon arrival, Baldwin faced accusations by Johanson of having deprived him of the command of the America. Various newspapers published articles about the expedition's internal rivalries.

Ziegler was disappointed how little had been accomplished. He also learned that Baldwin had made the expedition members sign secret contracts that severed them from the official Baldwin-Ziegler expedition, and instead re-engaged them with Baldwin personally at $5.00 per month. The contracts also forbade the men to give any public account of the expedition. Ziegler relieved Baldwin of the expedition's command, but organised a renewed attempt with Anthony Fiala in charge.

Ziegler later published a newspaper article with the testimonies of several expedition members criticizing Baldwin's command of the expedition on a variety of accounts such as insincerity, drunkenness, refusal of vital equipment, lack of ambition for actually reaching the pole, insufficient preparation, and insanity.

== Bibliography ==
- Briggs Baldwin, Evelyn (1901). "How I hope to reach the North Pole". The Windsor magazine. Vol. 15. Ward, Lock & Co. Ltd. pp. 59–68 – via archive.org.
- Briggs Baldwin, Evelyn (1903). "The Baldwin Ziegler Polar Expedition". Wide World Magazine. Vol. 10. George Newnes Ltd. pp. 396–402, 432–436, 587–593 – via archive.org.
- Capelotti, Peter Joseph (2016). The greatest show in the Arctic: the American exploration of Franz Josef Land, 1898-1905. University of Oklahoma Press. ISBN 978-0-8061-5222-6.
