= Yuly Shokalsky =

Russian oceanographer (1856-1940)

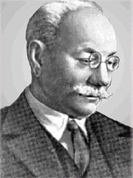
Yuly Shokalsky

Yuly Mikhailovich Shokalsky (Russian: Юлий Михайлович Шокальский; October 17, 1856 in Saint Petersburg – March 26, 1940 in Leningrad) was a Russian oceanographer, cartographer, and geographer. In 1917, he succeeded Nicholas Mikhailovich as President of the Russian Geographical Society.

== Life ==
A grandson of Anna Kern, Pushkin's celebrated mistress, Shokalsky graduated from the Naval Academy in 1880 and made a career in the Imperial Russian Navy, helping establish the Sevastopol Marine Observatory and rising to the rank of Lieutenant-General in 1912. As a cartographer, he continued the work begun by Aleksey Tillo.

While pursuing a naval career, Shokalsky developed interest in limnology and meteorology and became the most prolific Russian author on the subjects. In the Marine Miscellanies alone, he published some 300 articles.

From 1897, for four years, Shokalsky conducted research on Lake Ladoga. He determined the lake's area, measured its depths, calculated the volume of its water mass, and meticulously studied its thermal regime. In 1923–1927, he led an oceanographic expedition for a comprehensive study of the Black Sea.

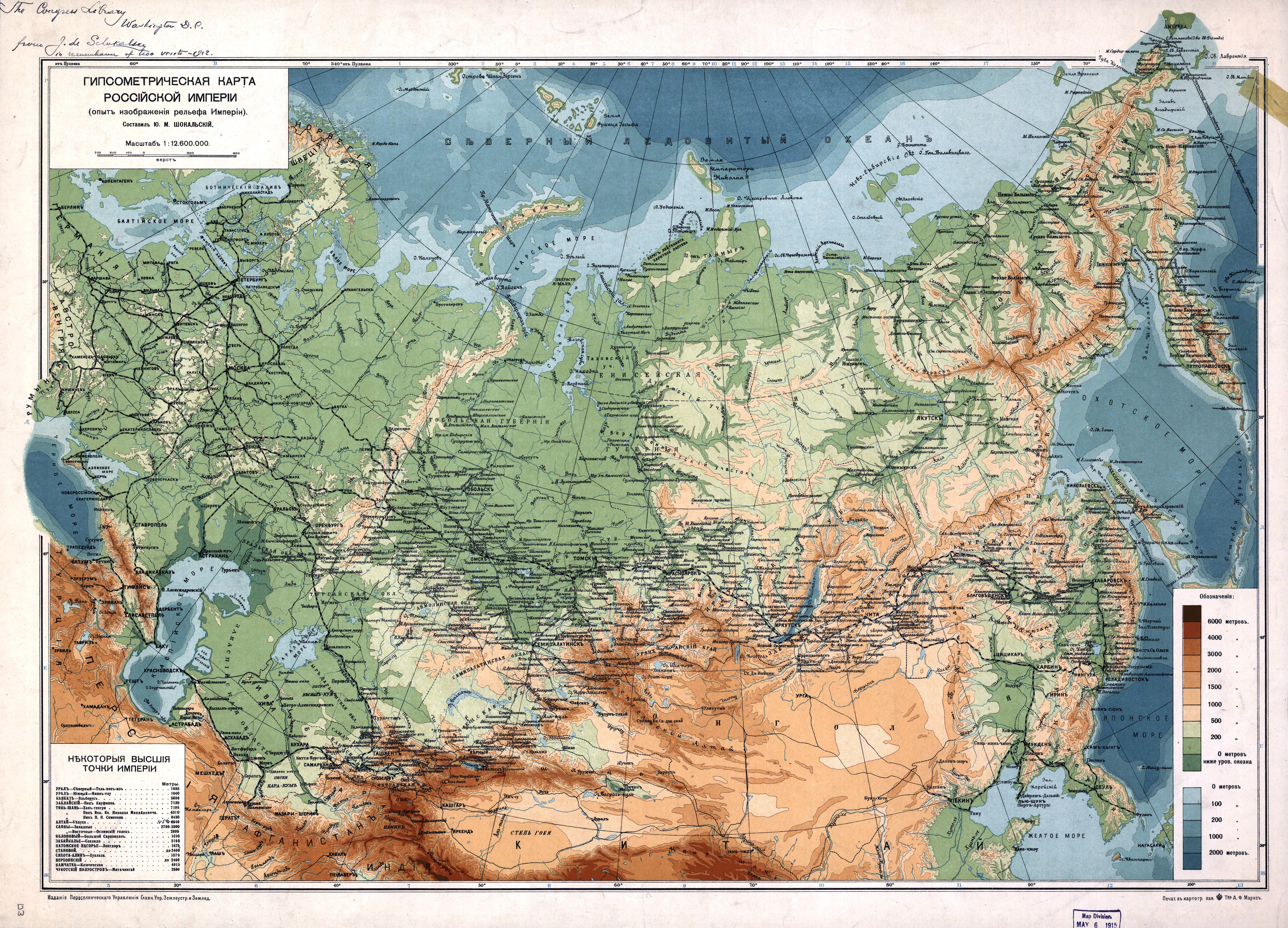
A 1912 map of the Russian Empire by Shokalsky, with his personal dedication to the Library of Congress in the upper left corner.

Shokalsky's most important monograph was Oceanography (1917), a collection of his lectures which examined connection between meteorology and hydrology and emphasized the importance of monitoring marine phenomena in order to understand global changes of climate. Shokalsky insisted on differentiating oceanography and hydrography and coined the term "World Ocean".

In 1904, Shokalsky was elected into the Royal Geographical Society. Ten years later, he was put in charge of the Russian Geographical Society and retained the post until 1931.

His daughter Zinaida Shokalskaya (1882-1961) was an expert on soil science. His son Alexander, an officer, was killed during the First World War.

== Honours ==
His name was given to the Shokalsky Strait connecting the Laptev Sea and the Kara Sea, to the large Shokalsky Island in the Kara Sea, and to the ship Akademik Shokalskiy.
