= Aleksey Tillo =

Russian geographer, cartographer, land surveyor and lieutenant general

Alexei Tillo Алексей Тилло
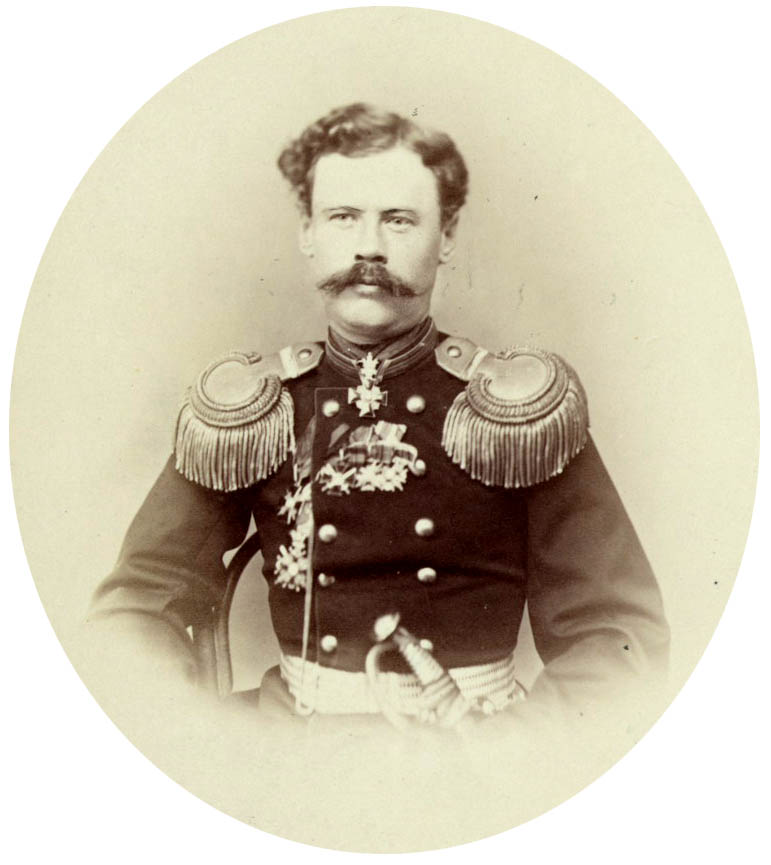
- Born: 1839; Kiev Governorate, Russia
- Died: 1900 (aged 60–61); St. Petersburg, Russia
- Military career
- Allegiance: Russia
- Branch: Imperial Russian Army
- Service years: 1856 - 1894
- Rank: Lieutenant General
- Commands: 148th Caspian Infantry Regiment; 37th Infantry Division
- Conflicts: Turkestan Campaigns
- Awards: Order of St. Stanislaus; Order of Saint Anna; Order of Saint Vladimir; Order of the White Eagle

Aleksey Tillo (Russian: Алексей Андреевич Тилло; Alexei Andreyevitch Tillo) (25 November (O.S. November 13), 1839, Kiev Governorate – 11 January (O.S. December 30), 1900, Saint Petersburg) was a Russian geographer, cartographer, land surveyor, lieutenant general of the Russian Imperial Army (1894).

Aleksey Tillo's grandfather was a French Huguenot, but his father was a citizen of the Russian Empire.

== Career ==
Aleksey graduated from the Mikhailovskaya Artillery Academy (1862) and Department of Geodesy of the General Staff Academy in Saint Petersburg (1866). His greatest achievement was a hypsometric map of the European part of Russia published in 1889. It was the first map of its kind that showed elevation correctly. For creating this map Tillo was elected a corresponding member of the Russian (1892) and Parisian Academies of Sciences.

Aleksey Tillo is known to have coined the term Central Russian Upland. Also, he measured the length of the main Russian rivers and conducted work on level difference between the Caspian Sea and the Aral Sea. Aleksey Tillo also authored a number of works on geomagnetism and meteorology. Part of the work he had initiated was continued after his death by Yuly Shokalsky (1856–1940).

== Honours ==
The Tillo Islands, a small archipelago in the Kara Sea, as well as Tillo Island (Franz Josef Land) near Wilczek Land in Franz Josef Land, were named after Aleksey Tillo.

=== Medals ===
- Order of St. Stanislaus 2nd class (1869)
- Order of St. Anna 2nd class (1873)
- Imperial Order of Saint Vladimir 4th class (1876)
- Imperial Order of Saint Vladimir 3rd class (1879)
- Order of St. Stanislaus 1st class (1885)
- Order of St. Anna 1st class (1888)
- Imperial Order of Saint Vladimir 2nd class (1891)
- Order of the White Eagle (1896)
