= Austro-Hungarian North Pole expedition =

1872-74 Arctic expedition to find the North-East Passage

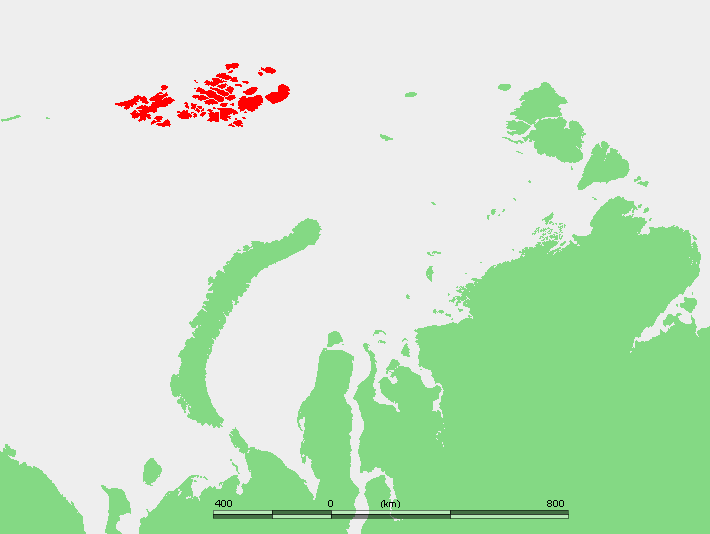
Location of the Franz Josef Archipelago

The Austro-Hungarian North Pole expedition was an Arctic expedition to find the North-East Passage that ran from 1872 to 1874 under the leadership of Julius Payer and Karl Weyprecht. The expedition discovered and partially explored Franz Josef Land.

== Background ==
The Austro-Hungarian North Pole expedition was largely an initiative of the geographer August Petermann, who was a proponent of a navigable northern Arctic Sea. Petermann had previously been involved in the German North Pole expeditions of 1868–1870, which had failed to find navigable paths on the east coast of Greenland. Petermann then advocated for probing the area between Svalbard and Novaya Zemlya, which he assumed would be less obstructed by ice due to the influence of the Gulf Stream.

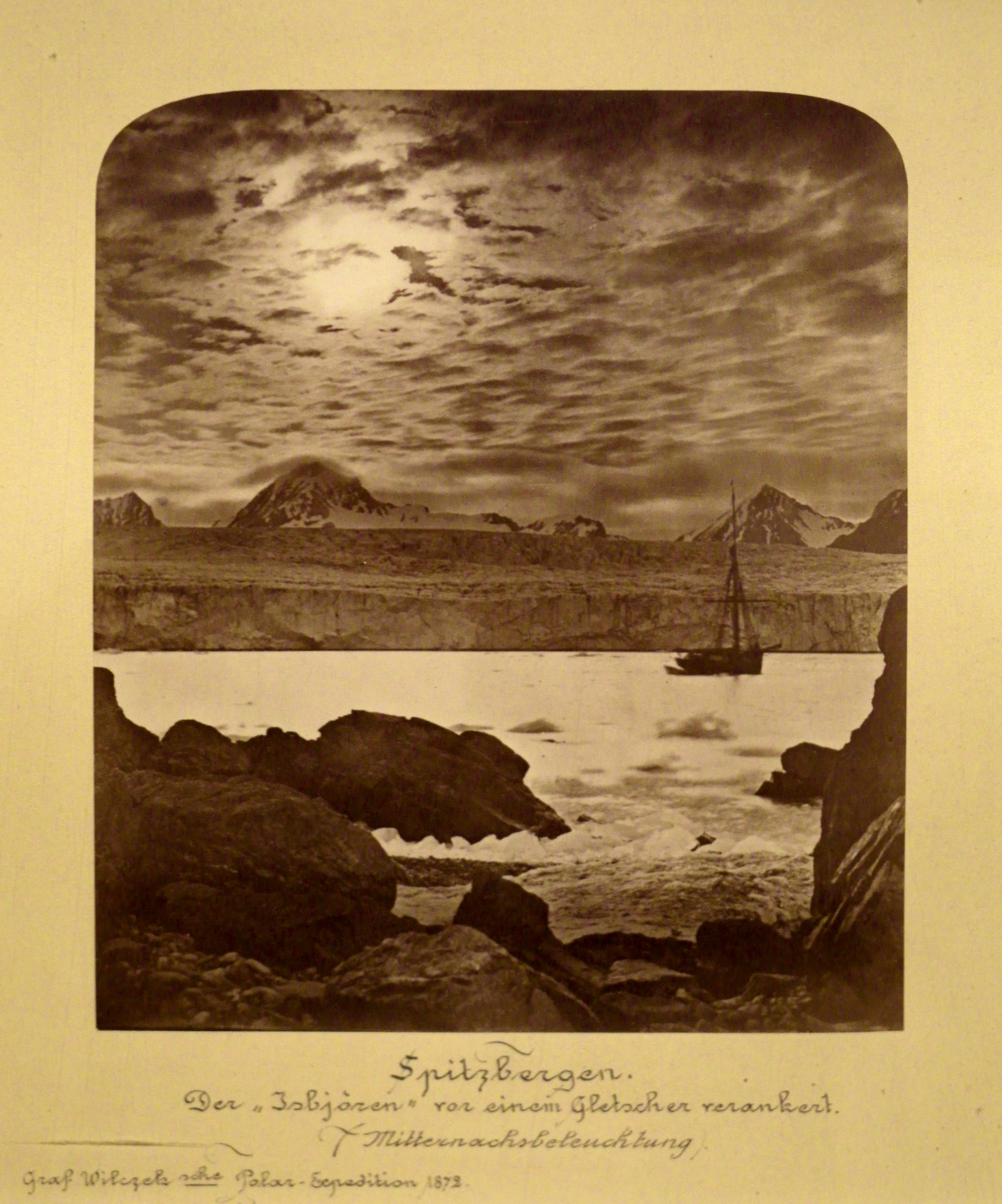
Sailing boat Isbjörn anchored in front of a glacier in Spitsbergen, 1872.

In 1871, a trial expedition took place. Weyprecht and Payer were put in charge. They chartered the Norwegian schooner Isbjørn and hired captain Johan Kjeldsen and a Norwegian crew in Tromsø. Isbjørn sailed to the east coast of Svalbard, in hopes of reaching Gillis Land. They found heavy sea ice however and were not able to advance from the coast of Nordaustlandet. To salvage the otherwise disappointing expedition, Weyprecht and Payer first conducted some exploration of the islands to the south, before sailing eastwards. Here they did find open water and managed to push far into the Barents Sea. These observed favourable ice conditions justified sending the main expedition into the same direction the following year.

After being dissatisfied with the Norwegians on the reconnaissance voyage with Isbjørn, Weyprecht decided to use an Austro-Hungarian crew for the main expedition. It was also decided that a steam vessel would be essential.

== Preparations ==
=== Plan ===
The expedition's purpose was to explore the Arctic Ocean to the North of Russia and ideally to find the Northeast Passage. The plan was to travel from Norway to the north coast of Novaya Zemlya and from there via the New Siberian Islands to America, all in 2.5 years. It was also hoped that the exploration of this area might discover land that could be used as a base for reaching the North Pole by sea.

=== Financing ===
The total costs of 222,600 florins were covered mostly by private donations, many from Austro-Hungarian nobles. The main sponsor was Count Johann Nepomuk Wilczek who donated ƒ30,000. Count Franz Salm (1819–1887) donated ƒ20,000. From government ministries and the Academy of Sciences the expedition received ƒ10,340 and ƒ10,000 from the crown. Further important patrons included Count Ödön Zichy (1811–1894), banker Ludwig von Ladenburg (1873–1877), Archduke Rainer of Austria, and Baron Maximilian von Sterneck.

=== Ship ===
The main ship was the Tegetthoff, named for the Austrian Admiral Wilhelm von Tegetthoff, under whom Weyprecht had served. It was built for this expedition by Teklenborg & Beurmann in Bremerhaven. It was a three-masted barkentine of 220 tons, 38.34 m long, with a 100 horsepower (75 kW) steam engine. Additionally, Count Wilczek personally chartered the sailing boat Isbjørn again, for laying an emergency depot.

=== Team ===
The crew came from all over Austria-Hungary, especially from the Eastern Adriatic coast (present-day Croatia), the primary recruiting area for the Austro-Hungarian Navy. They communicated mainly in Italian.

- Karl Weyprecht – commander of the ship (from Michelstadt, Hesse)
- Julius Payer – leader of the land journeys (from Teplice, Bohemia)
- Gustav Brosch – 1st officer (from Chomutov, Bohemia)
- Eduard Orel – 2nd officer (from Nový Jičín, Moravia)
- Dr. Julius Kepes – ship's doctor (from Vary, Hungary)
- Elling Carlsen – ice pilot and harpooneer (from Tromsø, Norway)
- Pietro Lusina – boatswain (from Rijeka)
- Otto Krisch – mechanic and machinist (from Pačlavice, Moravia)
- Antonio Vecerina – carpenter (from Draga near Rijeka)
- Josef Pospischil – stoker (from Přerov, Moravia)
- Johann Oratsch – cook (from Graz, Styria)
- Johann Haller – hunter and mountaineer (from the Passeier Valley, Tyrol)
- Alexander Klotz – hunter and mountaineer (from the Passeier Valley, Tyrol)
Sailors:
- Antonio Zaninovich (from Hvar, Dalmatia)
- Antonio Catarinich (from Lošinj, Istria)
- Antonio Scarpa (from Trieste)
- Antonio Lukinovich (from Brač, Dalmatia)
- Giuseppe Latkovich (from Plomin, Istria)
- Pietro Fallesich (from Rijeka)
- Giorgio Stiglich (from Bakar, Croatia-Slavonia)
- Vincenzio Palmich (from Volosko, Istria)
- Lorenzo Marola (from Rijeka)
- Francesco Lettis (from Volosko, Istria)
- Giacomo Sussich (from Volosko, Istria)

They were accompanied by two dogs from Lappland and six from Vienna, as well as two cats.

== Journey ==
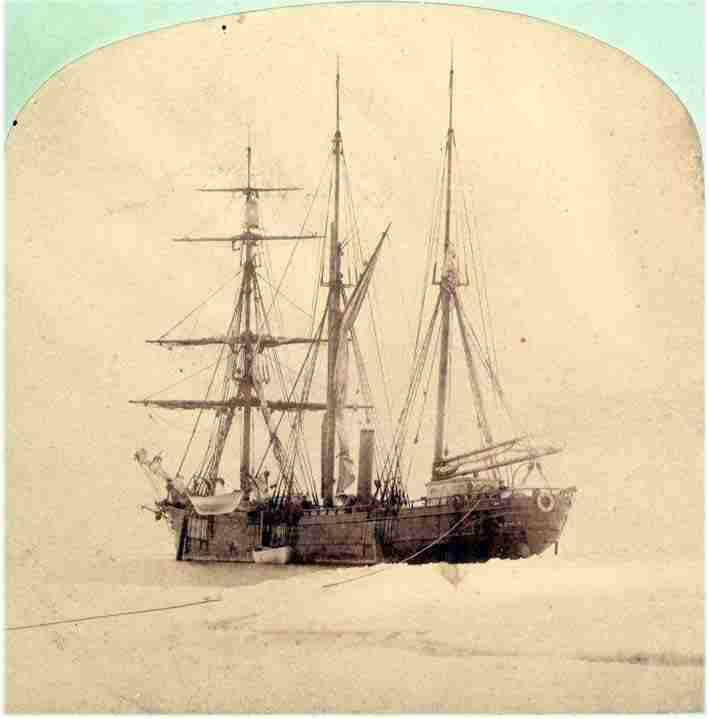
The Tegetthoff trapped in the ice

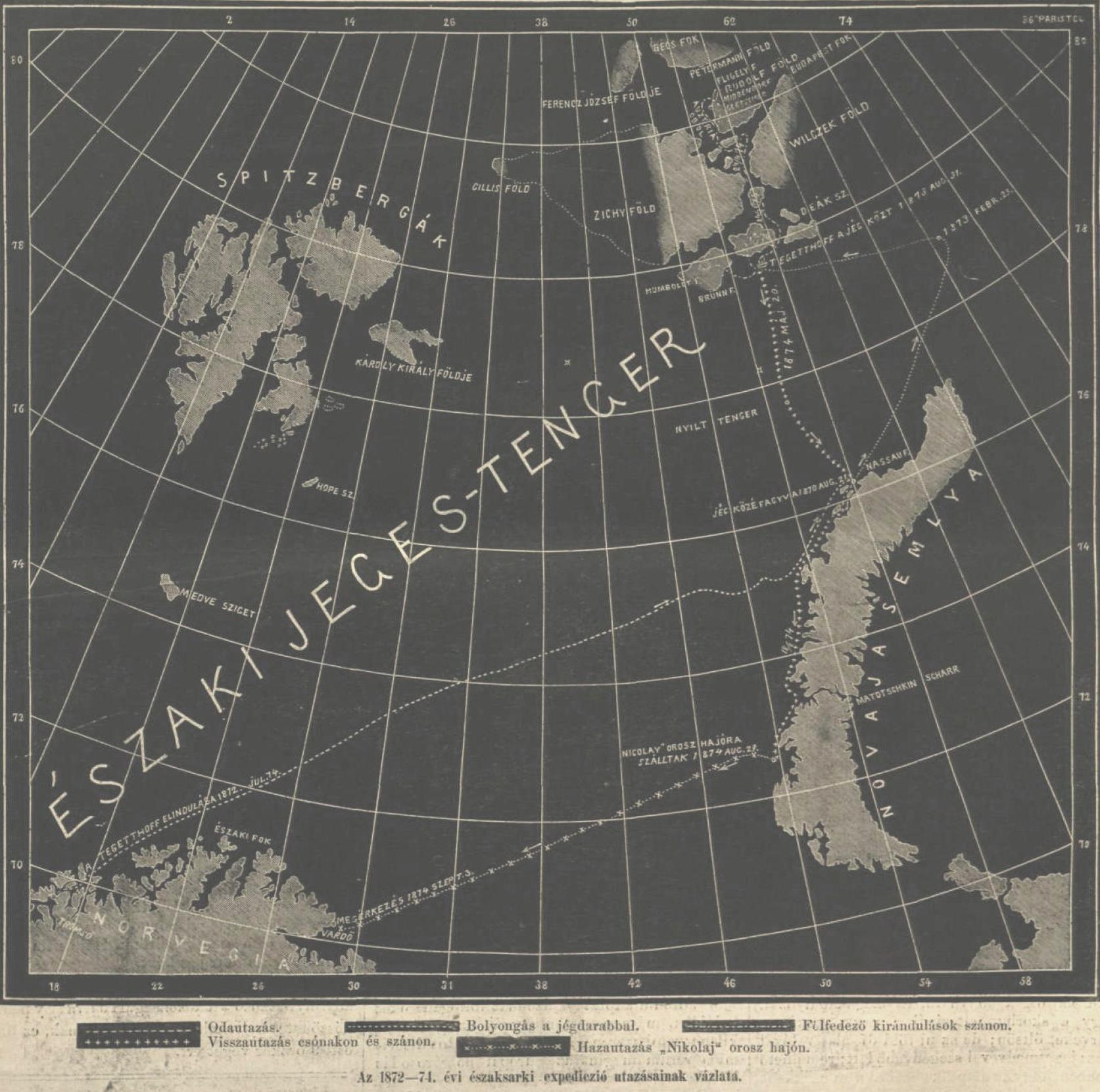
Route of the Tegetthoff, sledge expeditions, and return journey

On 20 June 1872, the Isbjørn set sail from the Norwegian port of Tromsø with the goal of laying a supply depot at Cape Nassau on Novaya Zemlya. Aboard were Count Wilczek, Baron von Sterneck, and Johan Kjeldsen as captain. The Tegetthoff with her crew of 24 left Tromsø on 13 July 1872. The two ships met near the Barents Islands off Novaya Zemlya, where the emergency depot was laid, in case Tegetthoff's crew would need supplies on their way back. Having completed her mission, Isbjørn then returned to port. Tegetthoff continued northward. At the end of August, she got locked in pack ice north of Novaya Zemlya and drifted to hitherto unknown polar regions. For an extended period of time, the ship was under threat of being crushed by ice. The expedition members frequently prepared to abandon ship.

On 30 August 1873, after one year in the ice, the explorers discovered an archipelago which they named Franz Josef Land after Austro-Hungarian Emperor Franz Joseph I. Tegetthoff continued to drift until the end of October, when the ship came to a halt by an island in the southeast of Franz Josef Land. In November, several small trips were made to the newly named Wilczek Island, before having to wait out the polar night for further exploration.

In February 1874, Weyprecht and Payer decided to abandon the ice-locked ship after completing sledge expeditions to explore the newly discovered lands. The first of these went to Hall Island where the expedition members climbed Cape Tegetthoff and Sonklar glacier. The temperature on the glacier fell as low as −50 °C (−58 °F).

The day after the return of the sledge party, Otto Krisch, who had stayed at the ship, died of tuberculosis. He had already reported suffering from chest pain in November 1872. Dr. Kepes later wrote that his symptoms had been worrying since April 1873. In February 1874, he had additionally contracted scurvy. Scurvy had also been a problem for other crew members but they were able to cure it with canned vegetables, lemon juice, wine, and polar bear meat. Krisch was buried in a crevice on Wilczek Island. The grave was sealed with a rock and fitted with a wooden cross.

The second sledge trip took 27 days. During the trip, the men were always running the risk that the sea ice would shift or open up and that they would not be able to return to the ship. They followed the Austrian Strait to the north, Payer surveying at various points along the way. The exploratory work meant that much of the eastern part of Franz Josef Land could be mapped. While crossing Middendorf Glacier on Rudolf Island, Zaninovich, together with the sled and dogs, fell into a crevasse. As an experienced alpinist, Haller was able to descend and rescue Zaninovich, the dogs, and the sledge with most of the equipment. They reached the northernmost point of Franz Josef Land, Cape Fligely (81° 51′ N) on 12 April 1874. Payer believed to have seen land further north, which he called King Oscar Land and Petermann Land.

A third trip to McClintock Island was conducted for additional surveying.

On 20 May 1874, they left the ship and tried to reach Novaya Zemlya. They initially took three boats, each mounted on a sled, as well as provisions and equipment for 3–4 months on three additional sledges. Each sledge weighed about 820 kg (1800 lb). A small dog-sled was also employed. They proceeded by hauling the boat-sleds for some distance, then returning to retrieve the additional sledges. The group made very slow progress over ice full of hummocks, cracks, ridges, and polynyas. Only after eight days had they advanced out of sight of the ship. On 1 July, they were unable to advance further and retreated to Lamont Island which they had found on the way. Weyprecht decided to briefly go back to the ship and retrieve a fourth boat while waiting for the ice conditions to improve. On 10 July, they continued southwards, sometimes hauling the sledges and sometimes rowing the boats across a polynya. Weyprecht noted some complaints about Payer's behaviour in his diary, but was quite proud of how harmonious and loyal the men were.

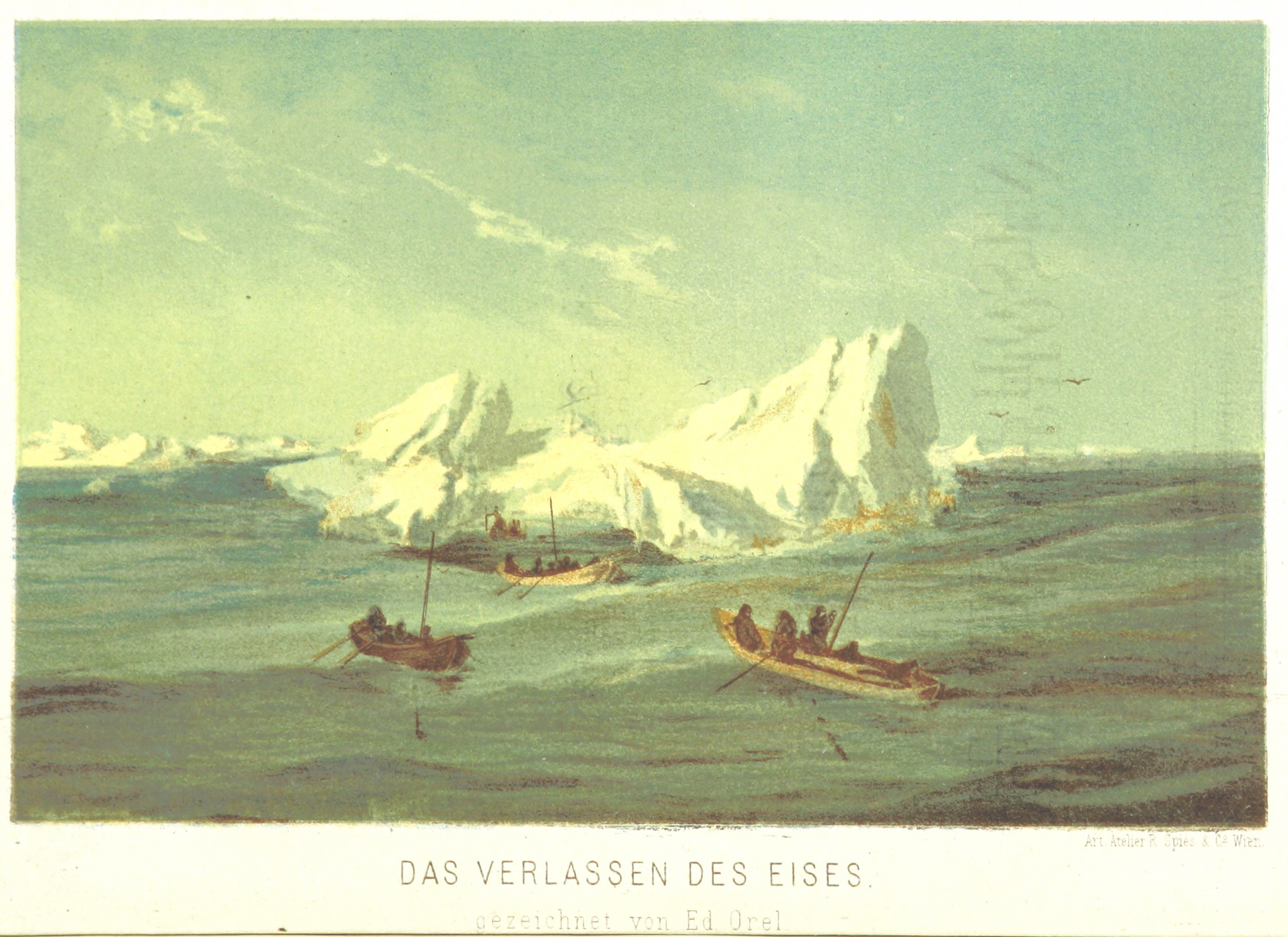
Leaving the Ice, drawn by Orel

On 14 August 1874, the expedition reached the open sea. The two remaining dogs had to be shot as they became seasick and destabilised the boats. After three days of rowing, they reached Novaya Zemlya. They aimed for the depot laid by Wilczek, but after accidentally rowing past it, decided to continue south and rely on the provisions they still had. On 24 August, the boats of the Austro-Hungarian expedition met with fishermen from the Russian schooner Nikolai, captained by Feodor Voronin. They were received warmly by the Russian sailors who were greatly impressed by the expedition's Russian Ukase containing instructions to aid them. Weyprecht and Payer agreed with Voronin to deliver the expedition to Vardø in Northern Norway for 1 200 silver rubles, three expedition boats, and two Lefaucheux guns. They reached Vardø on 3 September.

The expedition returned to Austria-Hungary by coastal steamer from Vardø and by train from Hamburg. On the journey they were met by crowds and invited to dinners hosted by local dignitaries and geographical societies in Norway, Sweden and Germany. They entered Vienna in triumph, welcomed, according to contemporary newspaper reports, by hundreds of thousands of people. Further festivities followed throughout Austria-Hungary as the individual explorers returned to their homes.

== Significance ==
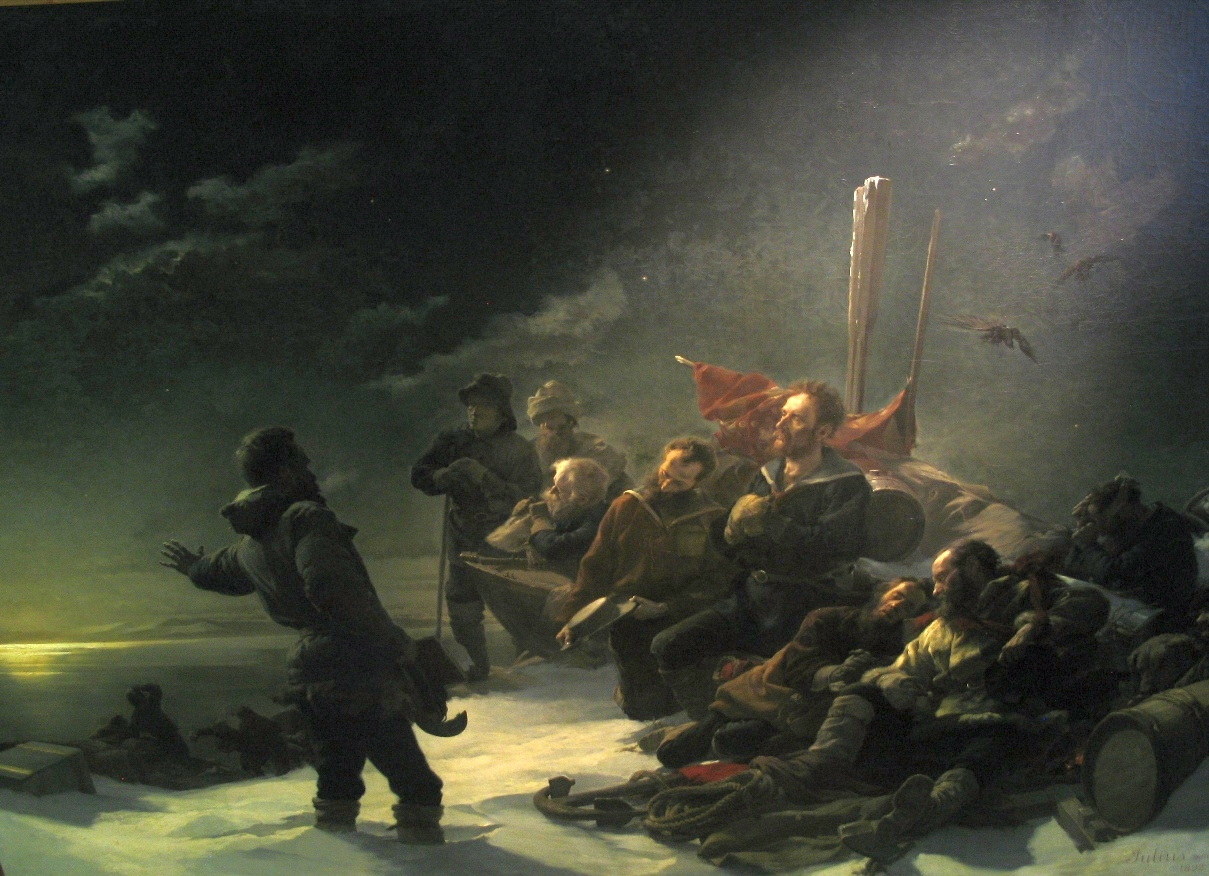
Never go back, painted by Payer

The expedition's discoveries and experiences made a significant contribution to polar science, especially the discovery of the Northeast passage by Adolf Erik Nordenskiöld. They also gave an impetus to International Polar Years, meaning a shift from sports-like races of single expeditions to worldwide scientific cooperation in exploring the polar regions.

The expedition yielded various results in the fields of meteorology, astronomy, geodesy, magnetism, zoology, and sightings of Aurora Borealis. They were published by the Academy of Sciences in 1878. There is a book (The Austro-Hungarian North Pole Expedition 1872-74) and paintings by Payer - probably the only paintings of a polar expedition created by the explorer himself.

== Memory ==
The Admiral Tegetthoff Ship and The Polar Expedition commemorative coin

In Vienna, Graz, and Wiener Neustadt there are several streets and inns that are named after the North Pole, Payer, Weyprecht, Wilczek, and Krisch. Payer was knighted in 1876.

Impressed by the expedition, Eduard Strauss composed the "Weyprecht Payer March" in 1875.

In 1978, Russian scientist Vladimir Serov found a message in a bottle left by Weyprecht on Lamont Island. It is now held by the Austrian Academy of Sciences.

The expedition was selected as the main motif for the Austrian Admiral Tegetthoff Ship and The Polar Expedition commemorative coin minted on June 8, 2005. The reverse side of the coin shows two explorers in Arctic gear with the frozen ship behind them.

== Bibliography ==
- Payer, Julius (1875). "The Austro-Hungarian Polar Expedition of 1872-4". The Journal of the Royal Geographical Society of London. 45: 1–19. doi:10.2307/1798702. JSTOR 1798702.
- Weyprecht, Carl (1875). "Scientific Work of the Second Austro-Hungarian Polar Expedition, 1872-4". The Journal of the Royal Geographical Society of London. 45: 19–33. doi:10.2307/1798703. JSTOR 1798703.
- Krisch, Anton (1875). Tagebuch des Nordpolfahrers Otto Krisch [Diary of Polar Voyager Otto Krisch]. Vienna: Josef Klemm.
- Payer, Julius (1876). Die österreichisch-ungarische Nordpol-Expedition in den Jahren 1872 - 1874 : nebst einer Skizze der zweiten deutschen Nordpol-Expedition 1869 - 1870 und der Polar-Expedition von 1871. Vienna: Hölder. (English version: New Lands within the Arctic Circle. Cambridge University Press.)
- Weyprecht, Karl (1879). Die Metamorphosen des Polareises. Österr.-Ung. Arktische Expedition 1872-1874 [The Metamorphosis of Polar Ice. The Austro-Hungarian Polar Expedition of 1872–1874]. Vienna: Moritz Perles.
- Österreichische Nationalbibliothek, Hundert Jahre Franz Josef's Land: Katalog einer Ausstellung im Prunksaal der Österreichischen Nationalbibliothek (Vienna 1973).
- Andreas Pöschek: Geheimnis Nordpol. Die Österreichisch-Ungarische Nordpolexpedition 1872-1874. - Wien: 1999 (download as PDF)
- Barr, William (2011). "The retreat from Zemlya Frantsa-Iosifa [Franz Josef Land]: the diary of Lieutenant Carl Weyprecht of the Austro-Hungarian north pole expedition, 20 May–3 September 1874". Polar Record. 47 (2): 97–125. doi:10.1017/S0032247409990568. S2CID 130423104.
- Schimanski, Johan; Spring, Ulrike (2015). Passagiere des Eises. Polarhelden und arktische Diskurse 1874 [Passengers of the Ice. Polar Heroes and Arctic Discourses 1874]. Vienna: Böhlau. ISBN 978-3-205-79606-0.

== See also ==
- Weyprecht Mountains
- Payer Mountains
