= Tillo Islands =

Group of small islands along the Kara Sea coastal region

Native name: Острова Тилло
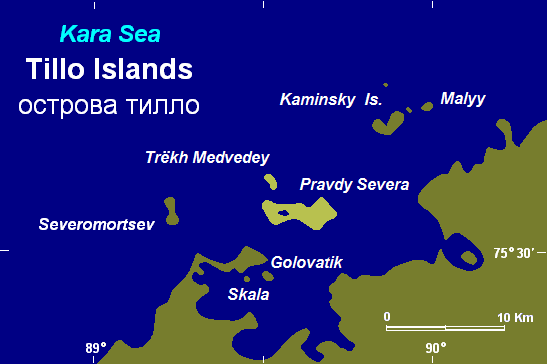
- The Tillo Islands off Bukhta Voskresenskogo

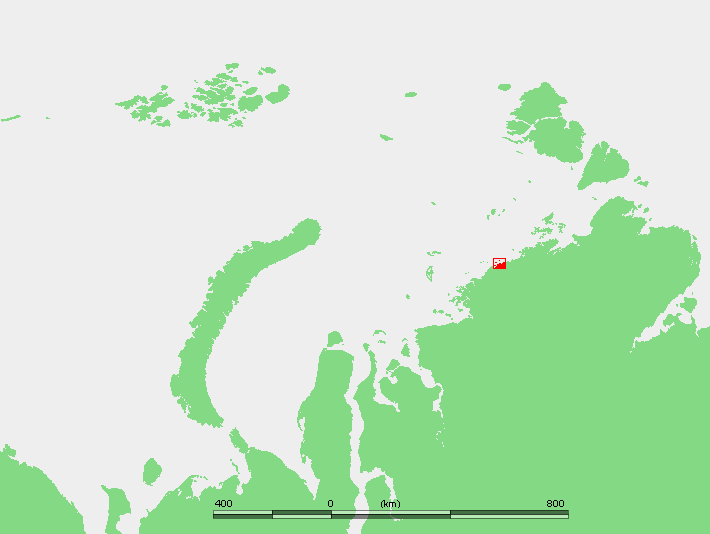
- Map of the group showing also adjacent islands.

Geography
- Location: Kara Sea
- Coordinates: 75°35′N 89°31′E
- Archipelago: Tillo
- Total islands: 2
- Major islands: Pravdy Severa

Administration
- Russia
- Krai: Krasnoyarsk Krai

Demographics
- Population: uninhabited

The Tillo Islands (Russian: Острова Тилло, Ostrova Tillo) is a group of small islands covered with tundra vegetation. They stretch along the Kara Sea coastal region, right off the bleak coast of Siberia's Taymyr Peninsula. Most of the islands of the group are a mere 3 or 4 km from the continental shore.

== Geography ==
The largest island of the group is Pravdy Severa. Its length is 7 km and it has a maximum width of almost 2 km close to its eastern end. There is a lake on the southern side of its western end separated from the sea by a narrow spit. This island is located at the mouth of Voskresensky Bay, a shallow bay. This bay is enclosed on its western side by the Polyarnik Peninsula.

The sea surrounding the Tillo Islands is covered with fast ice in the winter, which is long and bitter, and the climate is severe. The surrounding sea is obstructed by pack ice even in the summer, so that these islands are connected with the mainland for most of the year.

This island group belongs to the Krasnoyarsk Krai administrative division of the Russian Federation. It is also part of the Great Arctic State Nature Reserve, the largest nature reserve of Russia.

== History ==
The Tillo Islands were explored by arctic geologist and prominent scientist Eduard Toll who led the Russian Polar Expedition on vessel Zarya in 1900–1902. Sponsored by the Russian Academy of Sciences, this expedition explored the northern shores of the Russian Empire.

This archipelago is named after Aleksey Tillo, a prominent Russian geographer, cartographer and land surveyor.

== See also ==
- Kara Sea
- New Siberian Islands
