= Anthony Fiala =

American explorer

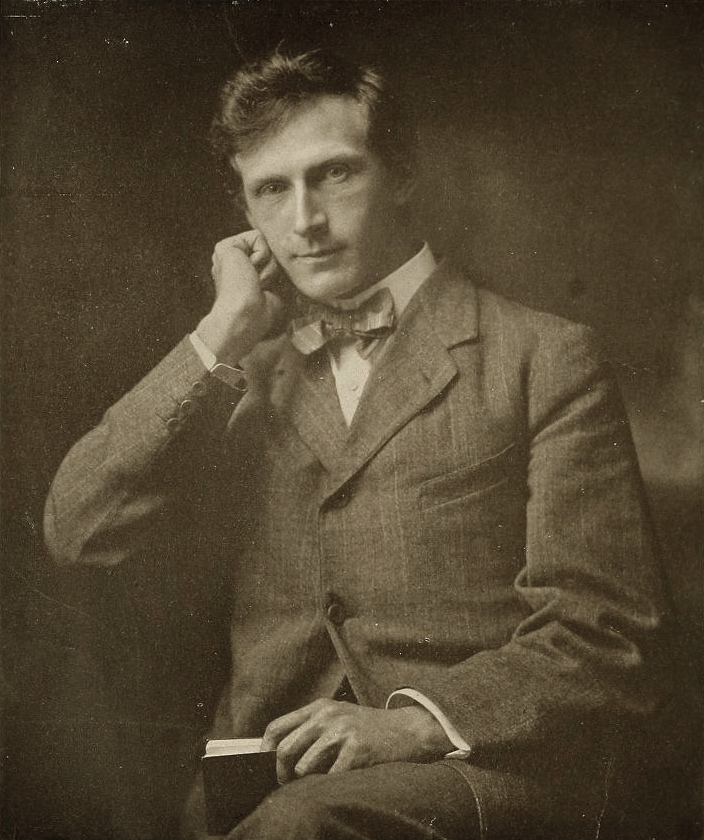
Anthony Fiala

Anthony Fiala (September 19, 1869 – April 8, 1950) was an American explorer, born in Jersey City, New Jersey, and educated at Cooper Union and the National Academy of Design, New York City. In early life he was engaged in various employments—as lithographic designer, chemist, cartoonist, head of the art and engraving department of the Brooklyn Daily Eagle (1894–99), and correspondent for that paper while serving as a trooper in the Spanish–American War.

In 1901 and 1902, he accompanied the Baldwin-Ziegler Polar Expedition as photographer. From 1903 to 1905, he was in command of the Ziegler Polar Expedition, sent out by Ziegler from Tromsø in July 1903. The party reached 82° 4' N, and surveyed the Franz Joseph Archipelago, but lost their ship, America in Teplitz Bay and failed to reach the pole. A relief party sent out under William S. Champ found Fiala and his men at Cape Dillon in July 1905, and brought them home.

In November 1907, Capt. George Comer successfully established a provisions base in the Arctic for Fiala's 1908 expedition. The New York Times stated:

The Captain has been successful in his work for the Fiala expedition, and says that he confidently expects that the men under Fiala, by merely entering one of the northward drifts and sailing with it, will reach the North Pole.

In 1914 Fiala accompanied Theodore Roosevelt on the Roosevelt-Rondon Scientific Expedition into hitherto unexplored parts of Brazil. He wrote Troop "C" in Service (1899) and Fighting the Polar Ice (1906).

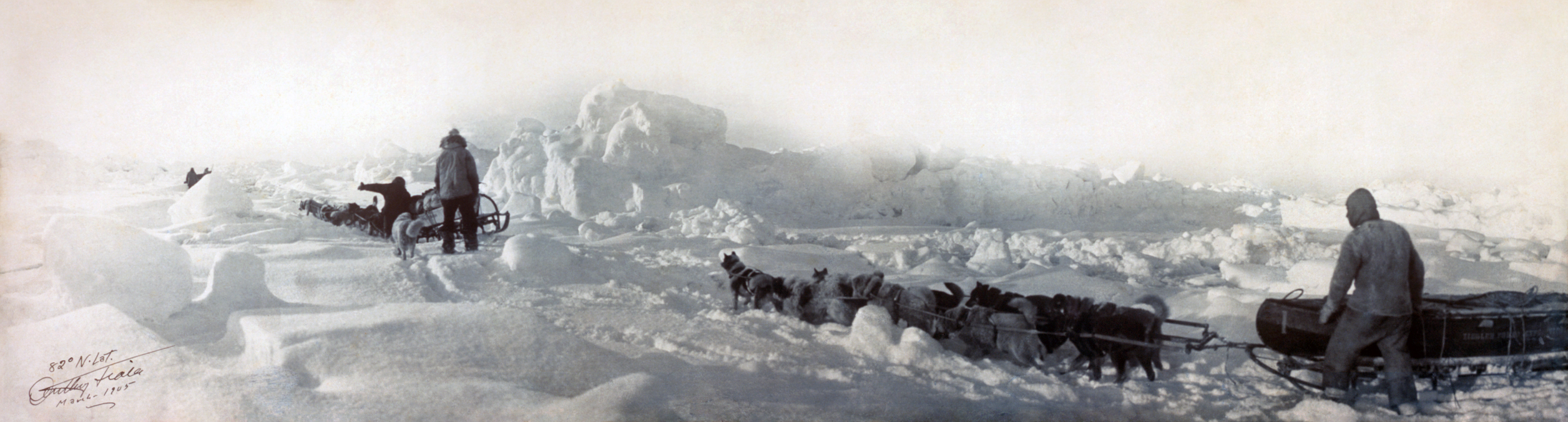
Image of the Ziegler Polar Expedition taken by Fiala at 82 degrees north latitude, March 1905.
