= Rudolf Island =

Island of the Franz Josef Archipelago, Russia

Russian: Остров Рудольфа
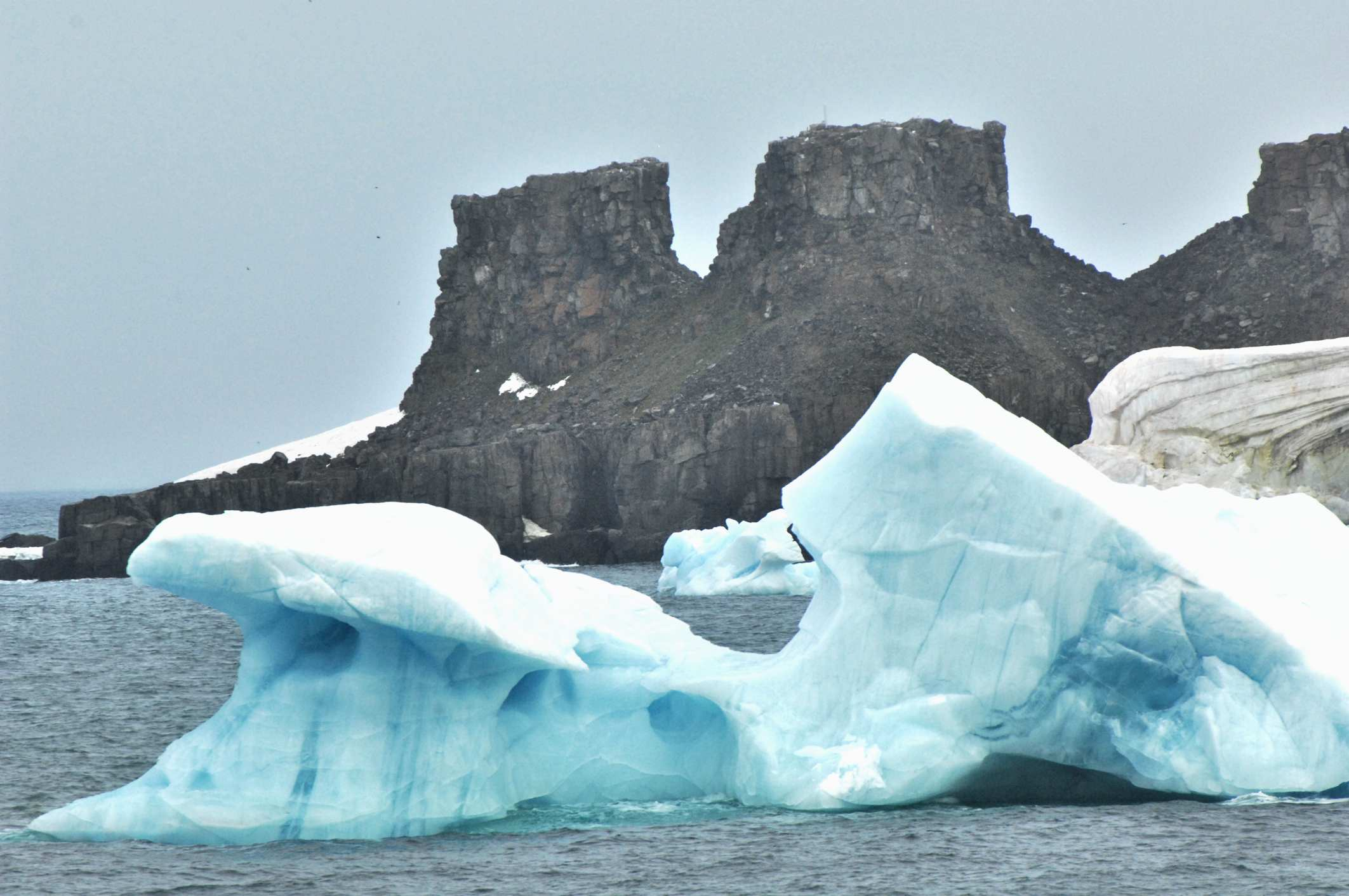
- Rock formations at Cape Stolbovoy

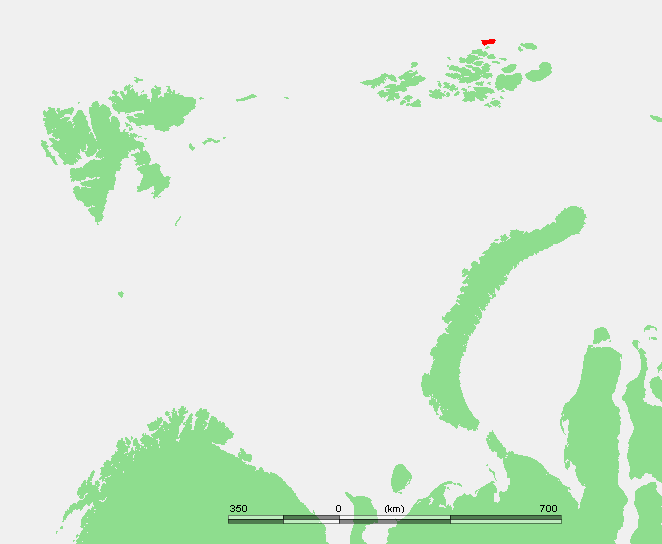
- Location of Rudolf Island at the northern end of Franz Josef Land

Geography
- Location: Arctic
- Coordinates: 81.767222°N 58.56°E
- Archipelago: Franz Josef Archipelago
- Area: 297 km^{2} (115 sq mi)
- Highest elevation: 461 m (1512 ft)

Administration
- Russia

Prince Rudolf Land, Crown Prince Rudolf Land, Prince Rudolf Island or Rudolf Island (Russian: Остров Рудольфа) is the northernmost island of the Franz Josef Archipelago, Russia and is home to the northernmost point in Russia.

Owing to the island's location, its sheltered Teplitz Bay has served as a staging area for numerous polar expeditions.

== History ==
The island was named by the Austro-Hungarian North Pole Expedition in honor of Archduke Rudolf (1858–1889), Crown Prince of Austria, Hungary and Bohemia. It belongs to the Arkhangelsk Oblast administrative region of the Russian Federation.

During the second International Polar Year, a weather station established on the island was the northernmost scientific outpost in the world.

Sheltered Teplitz Bay has been used as a stopping point for northbound ships. During 1899–1900, an expedition led by Prince Luigi Amedeo, Duke of the Abruzzi stopped in the area. The Ziegler Polar Expedition of 1903–1905, led by Anthony Fiala left a large hut here.

Owing to the steep terrain in Rudolf Island, the only airfield access is a small snow strip 300 m (1,000 ft) up a glacier. It was constructed in 1936 as a staging area for the world's first drift ice station, North Pole-1.

== Geography ==
Rudolf Island is almost completely glaciated. It is located very close to the limit of permanent Polar ice. Its highest point is 461 m (1,512 ft). The Middendorff Glacier (Lednik Middendorfa) covers the southeastern part of the island.

Cape Fligely, located on Rudolf Island's northern shore, is the northernmost point of Europe and Russia.

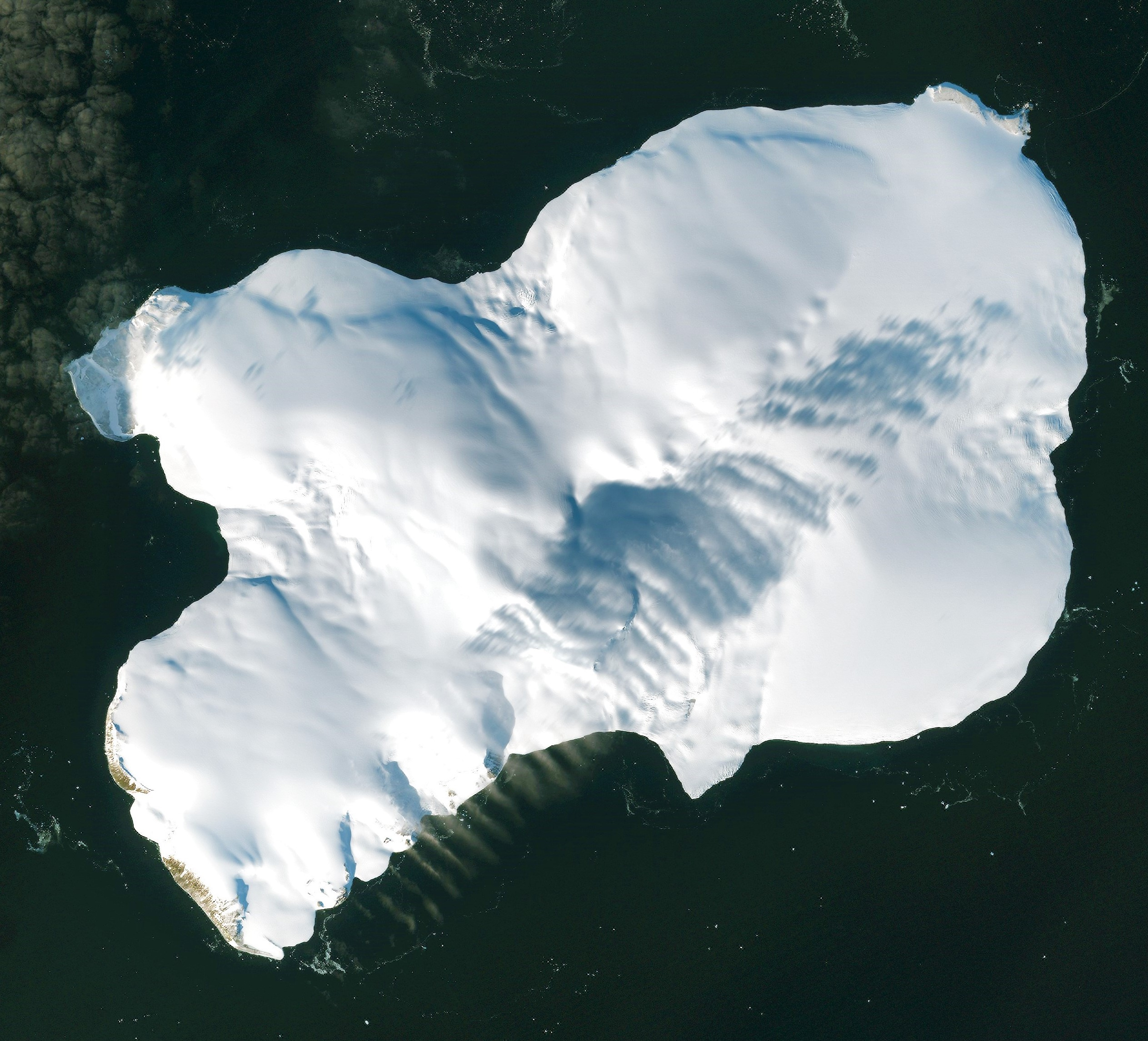
Rudolf Island, satellite image Sentinel-2

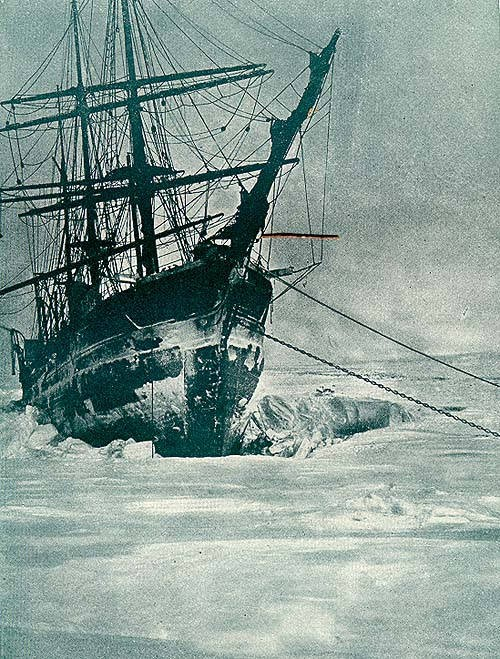
Ship marooned in the ice at Teplitz Bay, 1904

== See also ==
- List of islands of Russia
- List of glaciers of Russia
- Queen Victoria Sea
