= Karl Weyprecht =

Austrian explorer (1838–1881)

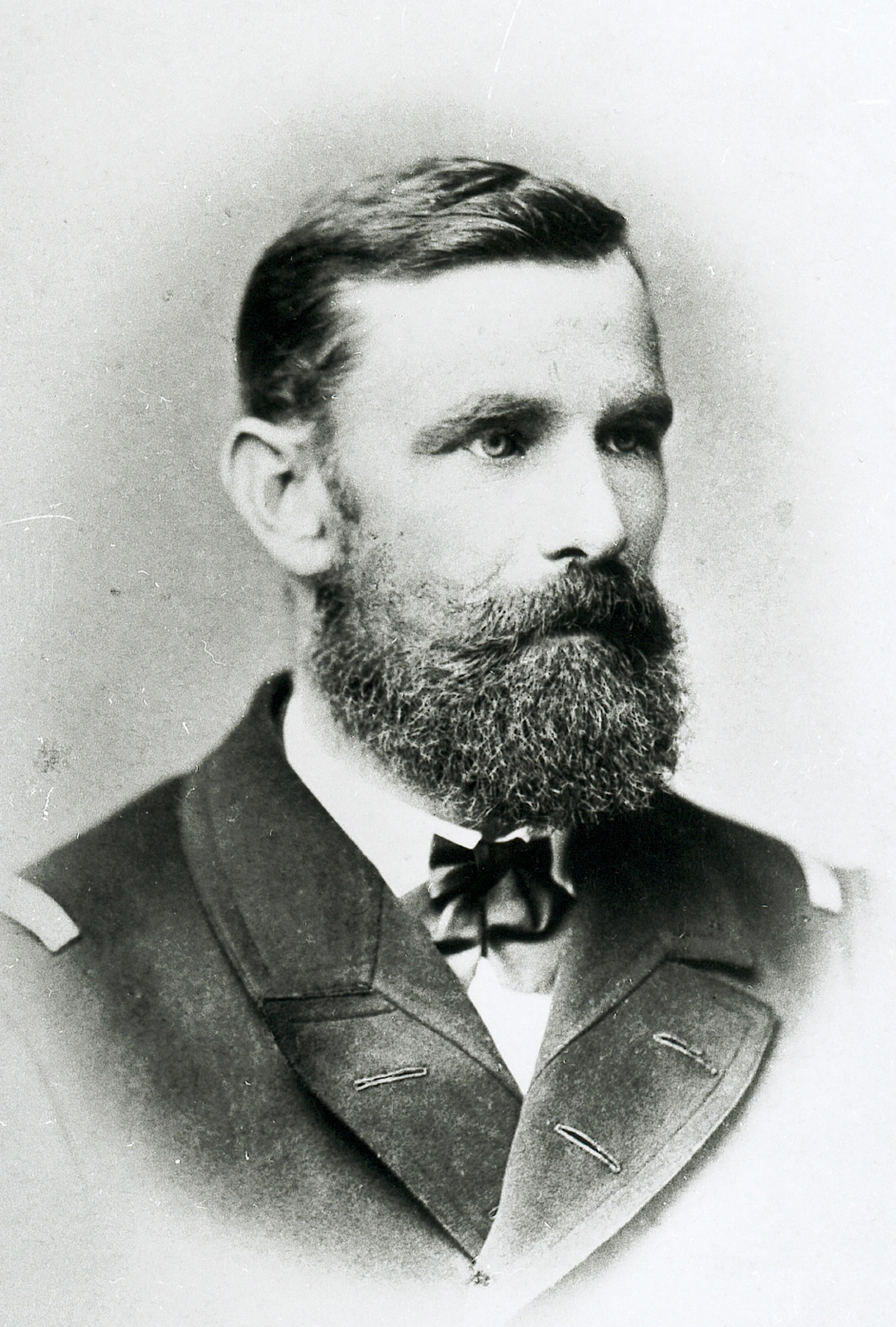
- Born: 8 September 1838; Darmstadt, Germany
- Died: 3 March 1881 (aged 42); Michelstadt
- Military career
- Allegiance: Austria-Hungary
- Branch: Austro-Hungarian Navy
- Rank: k.u.k. Linienschiffsleutnant
- Commands: Co-led, with Julius von Payer, the 1872–1874 Austro-Hungarian North Pole Expedition that discovered Franz Josef Land
- Conflicts: Austro-Sardinian War; Battle of Lissa (1866)

Karl Weyprecht, also spelt Carl Weyprecht, (8 September 1838 – 2 March 1881) was an Austro-Hungarian explorer. He was an officer (k.u.k. Linienschiffsleutnant) in the Austro-Hungarian Navy. He is most famous as an Arctic explorer, and an advocate of international cooperation for scientific polar exploration. Although he did not live to see it occur, he is associated with the organisation of the first International Polar Year.

In 1852, he studied at Gymnasium in Darmstadt, but later switched to Höhere Gewerbeschule Darmstadt, now the Technische Universität Darmstadt.

In 1856, he joined the Austro-Hungarian Navy (Kriegsmarine) as a provisional sea cadet. He served in the Austro-Sardinian War. From 1860 to 1862, he served on the frigate Radetzky under the command of Admiral Tegetthoff. From 1863 to 1865, he was instructional officer on the training ship Hussar.

On 23 July 1865, he became known to the German geographer August Petermann at a meeting of the "Geographic Society" in Frankfurt.

He served in the 20 July 1866 sea battle at Lissa, aboard the ironclad Drache.

He met Julius von Payer in 1870, and made a preliminary expedition with Payer to Novaya Zemlya in 1871.

On 18 February 1872, Weyprecht gained citizenship in Austria-Hungary.

He co-led, with Julius von Payer, the 1872–1874 Austro-Hungarian North Pole Expedition which discovered the archipelago Franz Josef Land in the Arctic Ocean. The expedition's ship Admiral Tegetthoff was abandoned in the pack ice. The expedition then moved on sledges to go further north, then to open water, where they used boats to reach the Black Cape of Novaya Zemlya and would eventually contact a Russian schooner, Nikolaj, under Captain Feodor Voronin, and get to Vardø, Norway, where they took the mail boat south and eventually returned to Vienna. He was awarded the 1875 Royal Geographical Society's Founder's Medal.

On 18 September 1875, he addressed the 48th Meeting of German Scientists and Physicians in Graz, Austria. He reported the "basic principles of Arctic research" and suggested that fixed Arctic observation stations should be established. According to Weyprecht, it was important to organize a network of Arctic stations taking regular measurements of weather and ice conditions with identical devices and at preestablished intervals.

In 1879, he presented these ideas, along with George Neumayer's to the 2nd International Congress of Meteorologists in Rome.

Karl Weyprecht died of tuberculosis in 1881.

== Commemorations ==
- The Austro-Hungarian polar expedition led by Weyprecht was selected as main motif for the Austrian Admiral Tegetthoff Ship and The Polar Expedition commemorative coin minted on 8 June 2005. The reverse side of the coin shows two explorers in Arctic gear with the frozen ship "Admiral Tegetthoff" behind them.
- Swedish musician Stina Nordenstam's sound installation Isens Fasor was spoken directly from Karl Weyprecht's expedition journal.
- Weyprecht Mountains, Cape Weyprecht, Weyprecht Fjord, Weyprecht Glacier, Weyprecht Islands
- The base camp near Erfoud, Morocco for the PolAres MARS2013 analog mission by the OeWF in February of that year was named Camp Weyprecht during the landing ceremony in the morning of 11 February 2013. (A smaller satellite location about 80 km further south was named Station Payer.)

== Bibliography ==
- Karl Weyprecht, Die Metamorphosen des Polareises. Österr.-Ung. Arktische Expedition 1872-1874 (The Metamorphosis of Polar Ice. The Austro-Hungarian Polar Expedition of 1872–1874)
- Julius von Payer New Lands within the Arctic Circle (1876)
- Andreas Pöschek: Geheimnis Nordpol. Die Österreichisch-Ungarische Nordpolexpedition 1872-1874. Wien: 1999 (download as PDF)
- Ursula Rack Sozialhistorische Studie zur Polarforschung anhand von deutschen und österreich-ungarischen Polarexpeditionen zwischen 1868-1939 (Vienna 2009).
