= Marat Fjord =

Fjord in Severnaya Zemlya, Krasnoyarsk Krai, Russia

- Фьорд Марата (Russian)
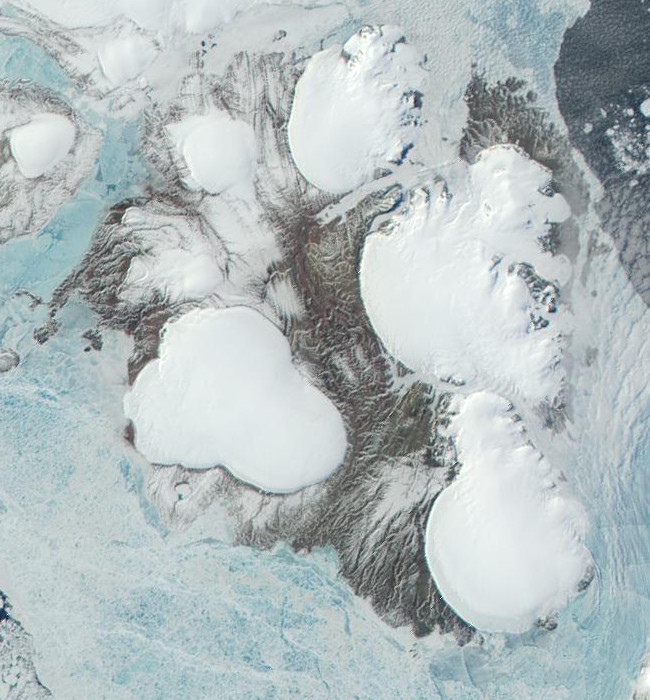
- Landsat image of October Revolution Island with Marat Fjord in the middle right

- Location in Krasnoyarsk Krai
- Location: October Revolution Island, Severnaya Zemlya, Krasnoyarsk Krai
- Coordinates: 79°13′N 99°31′E
- Ocean/sea sources: Shokalsky Strait
- Basin countries: Russia
- Max. length: 24 km (15 mi)
- Max. width: 4.8 km (3.0 mi)
- Islands: Storozhevoy Island

Marat Fjord (Russian: Фьорд Марата, Fiord Marata), is a fjord in Severnaya Zemlya, Krasnoyarsk Krai, Russia. It is blocked by ice most of the year.

== History ==
Although the shore of the island further north had been visited by Boris Vilkitsky's Arctic Ocean Hydrographic Expedition in 1913, Vilkitsky surveyed the eastern shores of what is now known as Severnaya Zemlya in a fragmentary way —he did not explore the Shokalsky Strait and assumed that the whole of Severnaya Zemlya was one single landmass.

This fjord was first surveyed and put in the map at the time of the 1931 expedition led by Soviet researchers Georgy Ushakov and Nikolay Urvantsev that explored for the first time Severnaya Zemlya. The fjord was named after prominent revolutionary figure Jean-Paul Marat (1743–1793). As in Matusevich Fjord further north, more accurate cartographic work of the fjord area was carried out by the 1950 expedition led by B.V. Zubov and A.I. Stepanov AI using aerial photography.

== Geography ==
Marat Fjord is one of the smaller fjords of Severnaya Zemlya. It has its mouth in the southeastern area of October Revolution Island, southwest of Cape Afonin on the Shokalsky Strait shore of the island. Storozhevoy Island lies off the mouth of the fjord to the east of small Bear Bay.

The fjord extends in a northwest/southeast direction for about 24 km (15 mi). The basin inside the fjord is fairly wide and regular, with steep mountains on both sides. At its inner end there is the terminus of an active glacier flowing from the massive Karpinsky Glacier in the northwest. Other active glaciers stemming from the University Glacier in the southwest flow into the western shore of the fjord forming icefalls in certain areas. The outpouring of the glaciers at the head results in a substantial amount of ice streaming out of the fjord the whole year round.

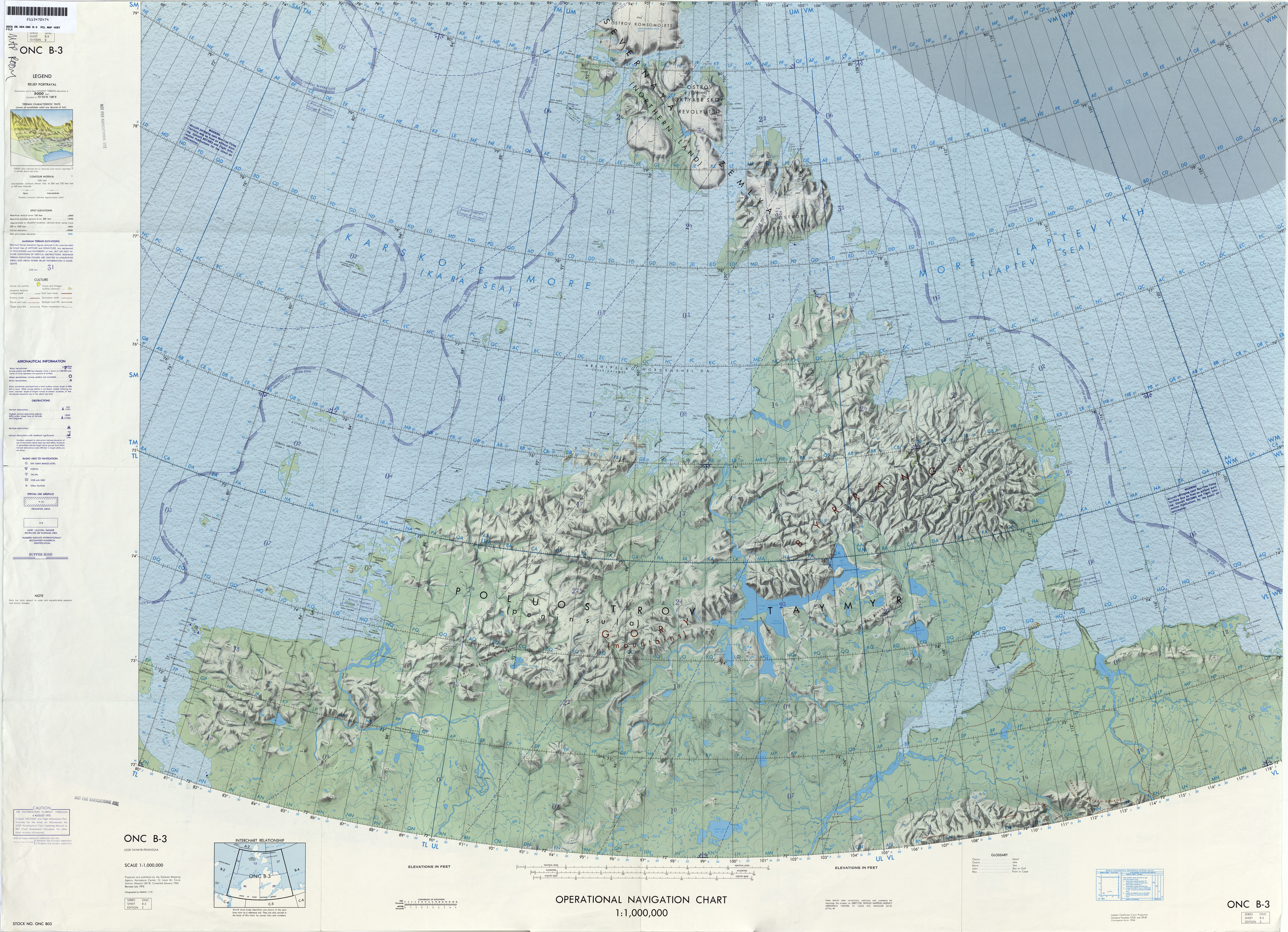
1975 map showing Severnaya Zemlya and the Taymyr Peninsula

== See also ==
- List of fjords of Russia
- Lake Fiordovoye
