= Ozyornaya (Severnaya Zemlya) =

River draining to the Arctic Kara Sea in Russia

- Native name: Озёрная (Russian)

Location
- Country: Russia

Physical characteristics
- Source: Lake Fiordovoye
  - coordinates: 79°20′09″N 97°27′18″E
  - elevation: 65 m (213 ft)
- Mouth: Kara Sea
  - coordinates: 79°00′01″N 96°32′52″E
- Length: 57 km (35 mi)
- Basin size: 2,140 km^{2} (830 sq mi)

Ozyornaya (Russian: Озёрная, lit. 'Lake-river') is a river in the Krasnoyarsk Krai of Russia on the island of October Revolution, belonging to Severnaya Zemlya archipelago. The river originates in the Fiordovoye lake, for the most part flows in a south-westerly direction and meet the Kara sea with the formation of a delta. In the middle reaches, it goes around the Vavilov ice dome along its southeastern border, where several tributaries from the glacier flow into the river.

This is the biggest river of Severnaya Zemlya in terms of basin area, but because of its source in the lake, it is only the second longest river of archipelago with a length of 57 km (35 mi). Several sources indicate its length as 64 km (40 mi), but they most likely consider the northern part of Fiordovoye lake to be part of the river and do not give details.

There are no permanent settlements along the river.
