= Schmidt Ice Cap =

Icecap in Arctic Russia

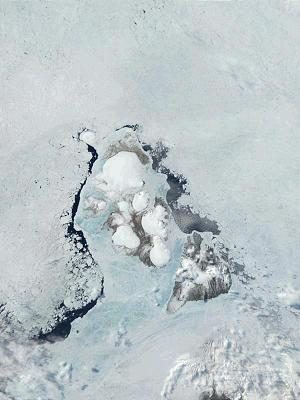
- Schmidt Island in the top-left-center (far northwest of the archipelago). Ice cap indistinguishable from tundra section.
- Interactive map of Schmidt Ice Cap
- Coordinates: 81.12137°N 90.90033°E
- Area: ~385 sq. km

The Schmidt Ice Cap is an Arctic ice cap very near the limit of permanent sea ice, so as to be indistinguishable from the sea in winter, spring, and late fall. It covers almost all (~75-85%) of Schmidt Island, a Russian Arctic island above the 80th parallel north. The ice cap's maximum elevation is ~320 metres (1,050 ft), and it has a diameter of 25.31 kilometres (15.73 mi) along its longest axis.

== Climate ==
EF, with frigid winters and snowy, very cold summers. It may be warming due to climate change. Almost all precipitation occurs as snow, and November through April have never recorded a temperature high enough to melt snow. Though the yearly mean maximum is 5 °C (41 °F), the ice cap (not the tundra on the outskirts of the island) is sufficiently cold that enough snow persists through the summer to support glaciation.

Climate data for Schmidt Ice Cap (not valid for the island's tundra, 1993-2023)
Month	Jan	Feb	Mar	Apr	May	Jun	Jul	Aug	Sep	Oct	Nov	Dec	Year
Record high °F (°C)	27 (−3)	27 (−3)	25 (−4)	30 (−1)	46 (8)	45 (7)	61 (16)	59 (15)	55 (13)	46 (8)	28 (−2)	27 (−3)	61 (16)
Mean maximum °F (°C)	7 (−14)	10 (−12)	14 (−10)	21 (−6)	27 (−3)	34 (1)	41 (5)	37 (3)	30 (−1)	23 (−5)	14 (−10)	12 (−11)	41 (5)
Mean daily maximum °F (°C)	−11 (−24)	−11 (−24)	−6 (−21)	7 (−14)	19 (−7)	27 (−3)	32 (0)	30 (−1)	23 (−5)	9 (−13)	−4 (−20)	−8 (−22)	9 (−13)
Daily mean °F (°C)	−17 (−27)	−17 (−27)	−11 (−24)	1 (−17)	16 (−9)	25 (−4)	30 (−1)	28 (−2)	19 (−7)	5 (−15)	−8 (−22)	−11 (−24)	5 (−15)
Mean daily minimum °F (°C)	−22 (−30)	−22 (−30)	−17 (−27)	−6 (−21)	12 (−11)	23 (−5)	27 (−3)	25 (−4)	16 (−9)	1 (−17)	−11 (−24)	−18 (−28)	1 (−17)
Mean minimum °F (°C)	−35 (−37)	−35 (−37)	−33 (−36)	−20 (−29)	0 (−18)	18 (−8)	21 (−6)	19 (−7)	5 (−15)	−13 (−25)	−24 (−31)	−31 (−35)	−35 (−37)
Record low °F (°C)	−54 (−48)	−47 (−44)	−58 (−50)	−36 (−38)	−22 (−30)	1 (−17)	14 (−10)	19 (−7)	−6 (−21)	−33 (−36)	−42 (−41)	−49 (−45)	−58 (−50)
Average snowy days	5.5	4.7	5.8	7.6	12	12.7	9	11.2	15.4	12.3	6.7	5.1	108
Source 1:
Source 2: for extremes

== See also ==
- Severnaya Zemlya
- Siberia
- Tundra
- ET
