= Lake Fiordovoye =

Lake in Arkhangelsk Oblast, Russia

- Location within Krasnoyarsk Krai
- Location: Arctic Ocean, Severnaya Zemlya, Krasnoyarsk Krai, Russia
- Coordinates: 79°20′37″N 97°43′04″E
- Type: Glacial
- Primary outflows: Ozernaya
- Basin countries: Russia
- Max. length: 15.2 km (9.4 mi)
- Max. width: 9.8 km (6.1 mi)
- Surface area: 57 km^{2} (22 sq mi)
- Max. depth: 97 m (318 ft)
- Shore length^{1}: 125 km (78 mi)
- Surface elevation: 65 m (213 ft)
- Frozen: September until August
- Islands: 1
- Settlements: none
- ^{1} Shore length is not a well-defined measure.

Fiordovoye (/ˌfjoʊrdoʊvoʊjɛ/, Russian: Фио́рдовое, IPA: [ˈfɪordovojʲɪ] or Russian: Фьо́рдовое, IPA: [ˈfʲɪordovojʲɪ], lit. 'Fjord-lake') is a proglacial lake on the island of the October Revolution of Severnaya Zemlya archipelago, administratively belongs to the Krasnoyarsk Krai of Russia. Within the island, Lake Fiordovoye is located between the edge of the Karpinsky ice dome in the east and the slopes of the valley on its western side.

It is the largest inland lake of the island and, depending on the degree of spread of the glacier over its surface, may be the largest body of water in the archipelago. Its modern area is estimated from 38 km^{2} (15 sq mi) to 57 km^{2} (22 sq mi). It has a jagged shape elongated along the glacier, up to 30 km (19 mi) km long, and is distinguished by significant depths up to 97 m (318 ft). Its average height of the water level is 65 m (213 ft) a.s.l. The lake is of glacial erosion origin, a significant part of its depression is filled with the Karpinsky glacier. It is now generally accepted that the lake is at least partially dammed by a glacier in easterly direction towards the Marat Fjord and belongs to glacier-dammed lakes. Despite this, over almost a century of observations, there have been no significant changes in the water level in Lake Fiordovoye and there has not been a cessation of its usual water outflow. Therefore, it is quite probable that the reservoir is not a lake dammed by a glacier, but a near-glacial one. And due to the considerable depth of Fiordovoye, the fractions of the glacier are probably afloat in its basin, in which case the reservoir may also be classified as partially subglacial.

The lake has very low temperatures of the water mass and almost permanent ice cover of great thickness; in some years, ice cover can persist throughout the year. In the colder climate of the last century, the lake was covered with perennial ice, which thawed only near the coast with dark rocks due to their better heating, and during the summer season there was only a decrease in ice thickness from three to one meter. In the modern period, the ice cover of the lake breaks up in August, the time free from ice cover does not exceed one month. The floating ice remain until the next freezing of the reservoir, a significant part of it comes from the glacier in the east - the size of individual icebergs in the lake can reach 500 m (1,600 ft).

The flow of water from Lake Fiordovoye is carried out through the Ozernaya River, there are no significant inflowing rivers. Since the main inflow of water comes from the Karpinsky glacier, its volume is determined by the air temperature - in the case of a warm summer day, the water level can rise by 55 cm (22 in) in one day. Its drainage basin also includes several smaller lakes. Three ice-dammed reservoirs in the southeast direction belong to the lake trough of Fiordovoye, they are separated from it by glaciers and can become its bays when they retreat. Of these, two lakes, Lentochnoye (Russian: Ленточное) and Ostroye (Russian: Острое), were de facto bays of Fiordovoye in 2019, but they can separate from it in the event of glacier growth. Lake Ostroye has one inflowing tributary, the Kan'on river (Russian: Каньон, lit. 'Canyone'), which brings water from the University Glacier. Besides several creeks from the glacier, the main body of Fiordovoye has only one noticeable tributary in the north, which has no name and brings water from a smaller lake of the same nature near the Karpinsky glacier.

The largest colony of kittiwakes in the archipelago was recorded on the coastal rocks of Lake Fiordovoye, and species of glaucous gull, guillemots and white gulls are also widespread.

== See also ==
- List of fjords of Russia
- October Revolution Island
