= Karpinsky Glacier =

Glacier in Russia

- Ледник Карпинского
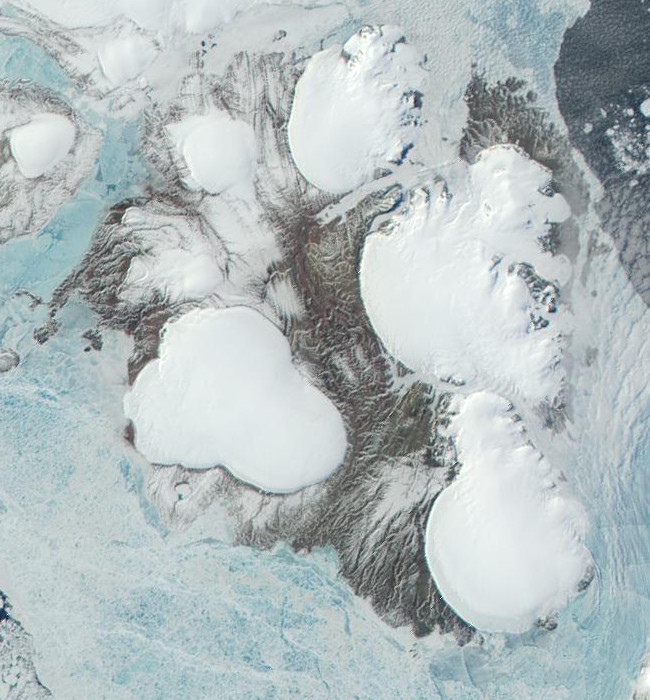
- Image of October Revolution Island with the Karpinsky Glacier in the upper right part

- Location within Krasnoyarsk Krai
- Interactive map of Karpinsky Glacier
- Type: Ice cap
- Location: October Revolution Island, Severnaya Zemlya; Krasnoyarsk Krai, Russia
- Coordinates: 79°39′N 99°2′E
- Area: 2,800 km^{2} (1,100 sq mi)
- Highest elevation: 963 m (3,159 ft)

Karpinsky Glacier or Karpinsky Ice Cap (Russian: Ледник Карпинского; Lednik Karpinskogo), also known as Mount Karpinsky, is a large ice cap on October Revolution Island, Severnaya Zemlya, Russian Federation.

It was named after Aleksandr Petrovich Karpinsky, a Russian geologist.

== Geography ==
This ice cap has a surface of 2,800 km^{2} and is the largest of the seven ice caps on October Revolution Island. Its maximum height is 963 m and it is also the highest point in Severnaya Zemlya.

The Karpinsky Ice Cap is located on the eastern side of the island with the Laptev Sea and the Shokalsky Strait on its eastern side. To the north it feeds the Matusevich Fjord, the largest fjord in the archipelago, beyond which lies the Rusanov Glacier; to the southeast, it feeds the head of the smaller Marat Fjord.

To the south of the Karpinsky Glacier lies the University Glacier, which reaches a height of 806 m.

== See also ==
- List of glaciers in Russia
- Lake Fiordovoye
