= Pioneer Island (Russia) =

Island in the Severnaya Zemlya group in the Russian Arctic

Coordinates: 79.917°N 92.033°E

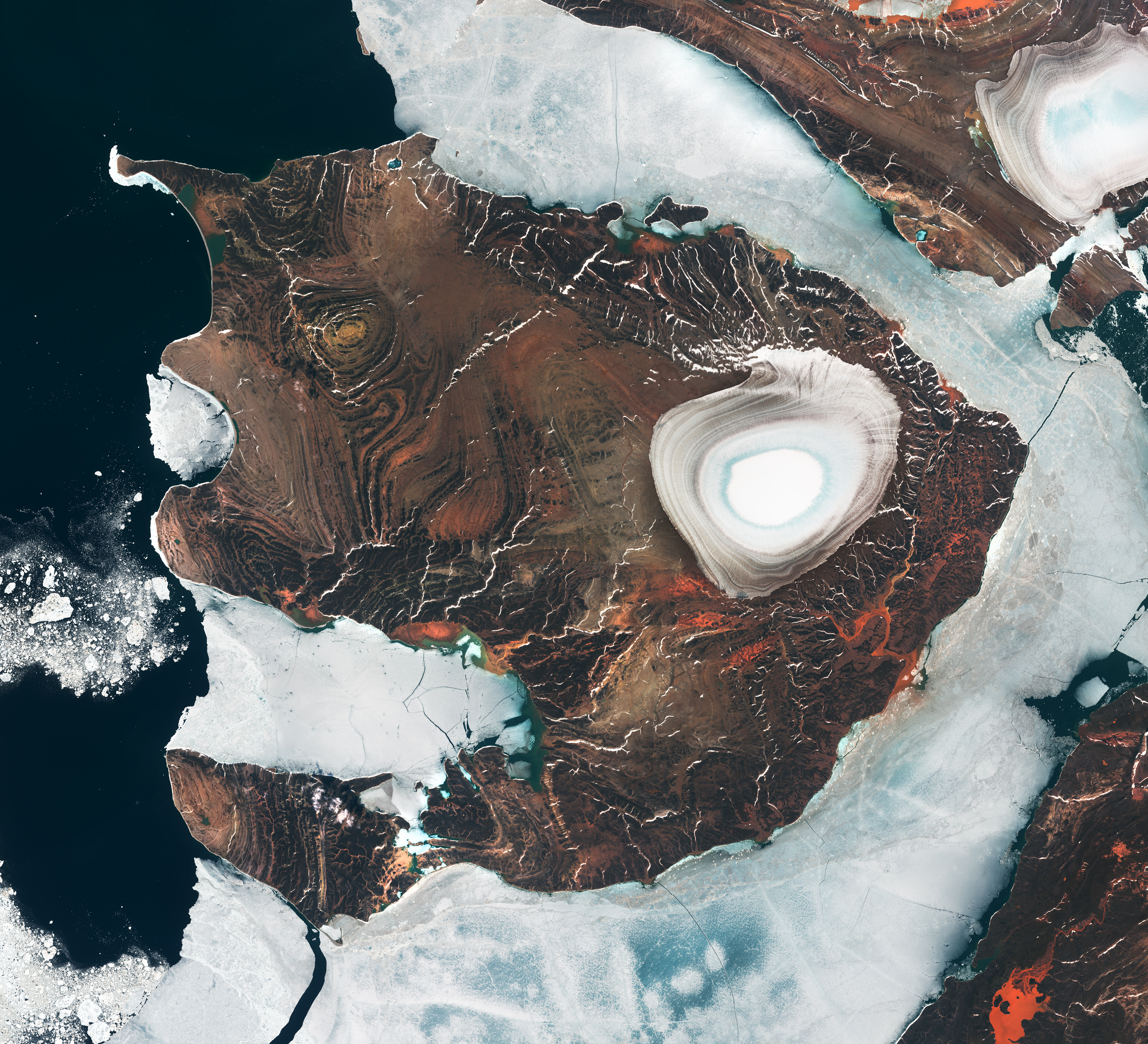
- July 2020 satellite photograph of Pioneer Island

- Pioneer Island, Russia

Geography
- Archipelago: Severnaya Zemlya

Administration
- Russia

Demographics
- Population: 0

Pioneer Island is part of the Severnaya Zemlya group in the Russian Arctic. It measures 1,527 km^{2} (590 sq mi) in area. The island was discovered by Georgy Ushakov and Nikolay Urvantsev during their 1930-32 expedition.

This island contains the Pioneer Glacier.

Geological and biological data: &

== Paleontology ==
Fossilized scales of thelodont Paralogania klubovi and a single scale of indeterminate Loganelliidae were found in the Llandovery deposits of the Silurian period, on Pioneer Island.

== See also ==
- List of islands of Russia
