= Cape Berg =

Headland in Severnaya Zemlya, Russia

Cape Berg Мыс Берга
- Cape
- Location of Cape Berg in Krasnoyarsk Krai
- Coordinates: 80°1′25.9″N 99°23′44.1″E
- Location: October Revolution Island, Severnaya Zemlya, Russia
- Offshore water bodies: Laptev Sea

Area
  - Total: Russian Far North

Cape Berg (Russian: Мыс Берга, Mys Berga) is a headland in Severnaya Zemlya, Russia.

This cape was named after prominent Soviet geographer and biologist Lev Berg (1876 – 1950).

== Geography ==
Stretching out towards the Laptev Sea east of the Rusanov Glacier, Cape Berg is the northeasternmost point of October Revolution Island.

== History ==
The shore of present-day Severnaya Zemlya was discovered by Boris Vilkitsky in 1913 during the Arctic Ocean Hydrographic Expedition on behalf of the Russian Hydrographic Service. On 3 September 1913 members of the expedition went to the shore near Cape Berg, on what is now known as October Revolution Island. They raised the Russian flag on the shore and named the new territory Tayvay Land (Russian: Земля Тайвай, Zemlya Tayway), after the first syllable of their icebreaker's names (Taymyr & Vaygach), charting parts of the Laptev Sea coast of what they believed to be a single island. Later the new discovery was named Emperor Nicholas II Land, (Russian: Zemlya Imperatora Nikolaya II), after Emperor Nicholas II of Russia.

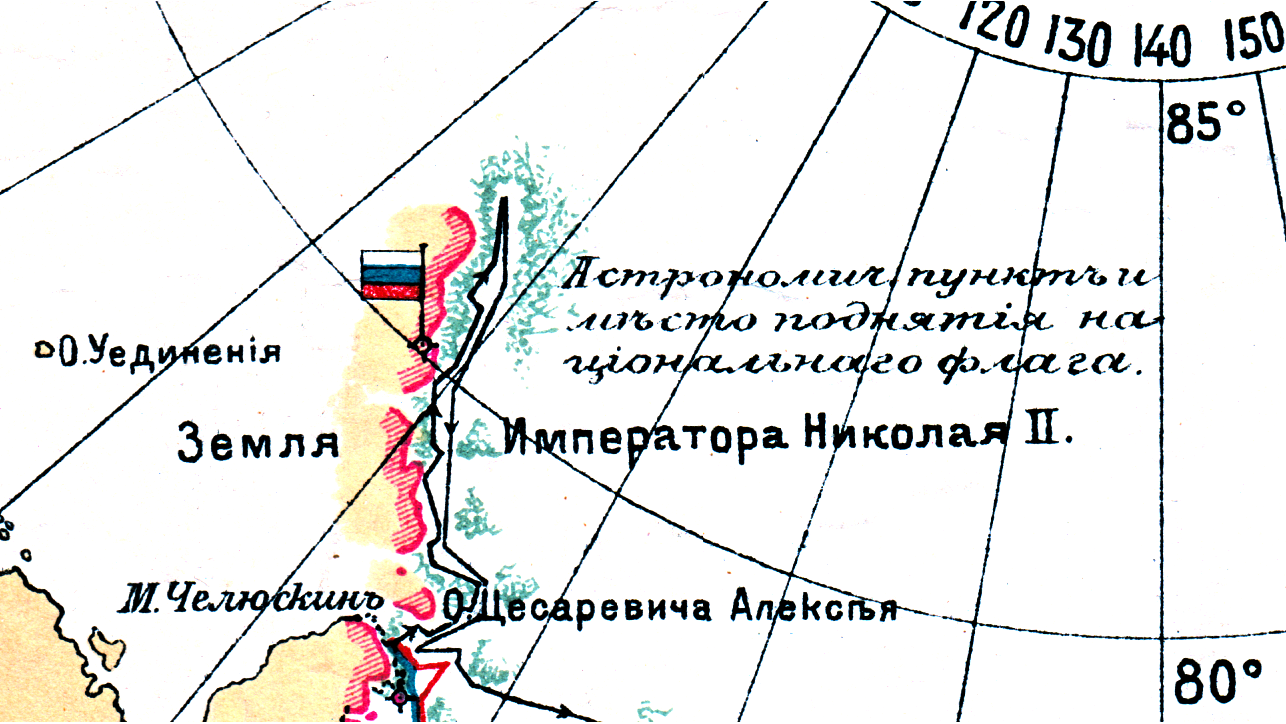
Emperor Nicholas II Land as mapped and named by Vilkitsky's expedition team in 1913. The Russian flag stands on Cape Berg.

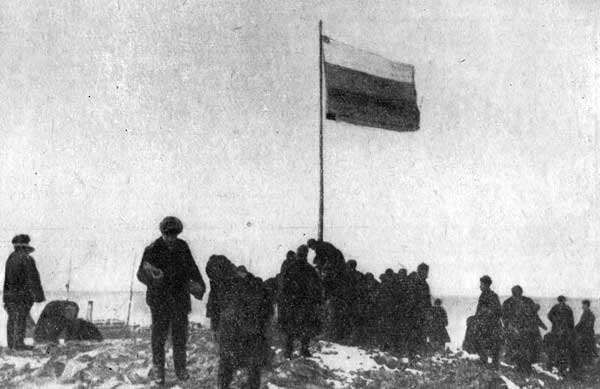
Raising of the Russian flag at Cape Berg during the 1913 Arctic Ocean Hydrographic Expedition.
