= Matusevich Fjord =

Fjord in Severnaya Zemlya, Russia

- Фьорд Матусевича (Russian)
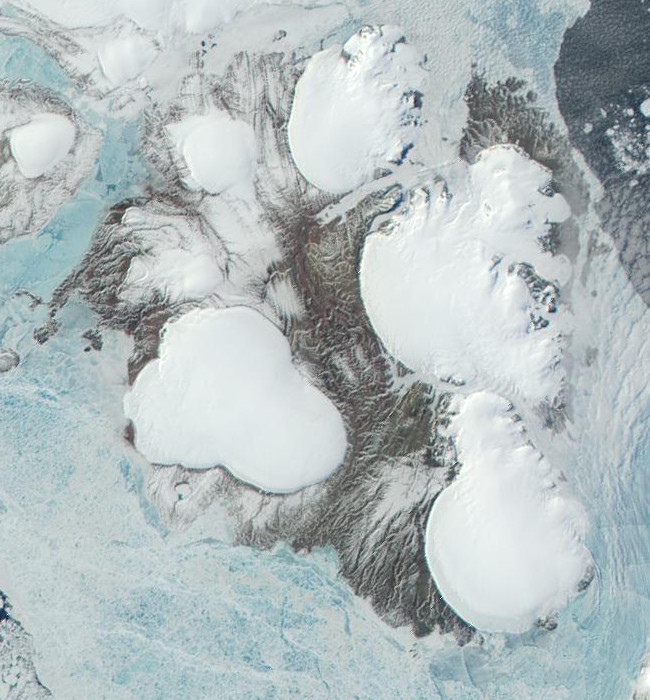
- Landsat image of October Revolution Island with Matusevich Fjord in the upper right

- Location in Krasnoyarsk Krai
- Location: October Revolution Island, Severnaya Zemlya, Krasnoyarsk Krai
- Coordinates: 80°0′N 98°15′E
- Ocean/sea sources: Laptev Sea
- Basin countries: Russia
- Max. length: 60 km (37 mi)
- Max. width: 12.5 km (7.8 mi)
- Average depth: 249 m (817 ft)
- Islands: Trudnyy Island and Pregrazhdayushchy Island

Matusevich Fjord (Russian: Фьорд Матусевича, Fiord Matusevicha), is a fjord in Severnaya Zemlya, Krasnoyarsk Krai, Russia.

This fjord is blocked by heavy ice the whole year round. Its iceberg-producing activity is unmatched by other fjords of Severnaya Zemlya.

== History ==
Matusevich Fjord was first put in the map at the time of the 1931 expedition led by Soviet researchers Georgy Ushakov and Nikolay Urvantsev that explored for the first time Severnaya Zemlya. More accurate cartographic work of the fjord area was carried out by the 1950 expedition led by B.V. Zubov and A.I. Stepanov using aerial photography.

The fjord was named in honor of Nikolai Matusevich, a prominent researcher of the Soviet Arctic.

== Geography ==
Matusevich Fjord is a fjord has its mouth in the northeastern area of October Revolution Island, west of Cape Figurny on the Laptev Sea shore of the island. It is the largest fjord in Severnaya Zemlya. Vollosovich Island and Blizhny Island lie off the mouth of the fjord to the west and to the east respectively.

The fjord extends in a roughly northeast/southwest direction for about 60 km (37 mi). The basin inside the fjord has steep mountains on both sides, the highest reaching a height of 590 m (1,940 ft) at Gora Bazarnaya. At its inner end there are three branches converging into the fjord, all with active glaciers stemming from the Rusanov Glacier in the northwest and the enormous Karpinsky Glacier in the southeast, producing a great amount of icebergs. The constant outpouring of the glaciers at the head results in massive amounts of ice streaming out of the fjord.

There are two small islets in the inner fjord, close to the glacier terminus' zone, Trudny Island with a diameter of 1 km (0.62 mi), and 1.3 km (0.81 mi) long Pregrazhdayushchy Island where a geodetic point stands.

== Ecology ==
Matusevich Fjord is part of the Northern Nature Reserve, one of the seven subdivisions of the Great Arctic State Nature Reserve. There are numerous bird colonies in the cliffs of the fjord, including thick-billed murres (Uria lomvia), gulls (Larus hyperboreus) and snow buntings (Plectrophenax nivalis), among others.

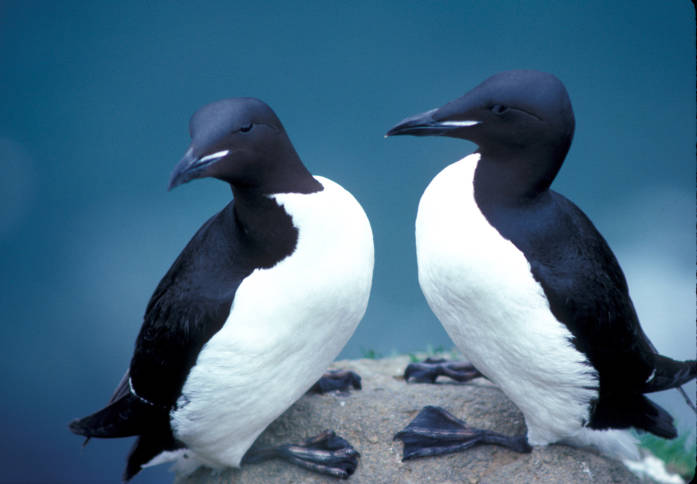
There are large concentrations of thick-billed murres in the cliffs flanking the fjord.

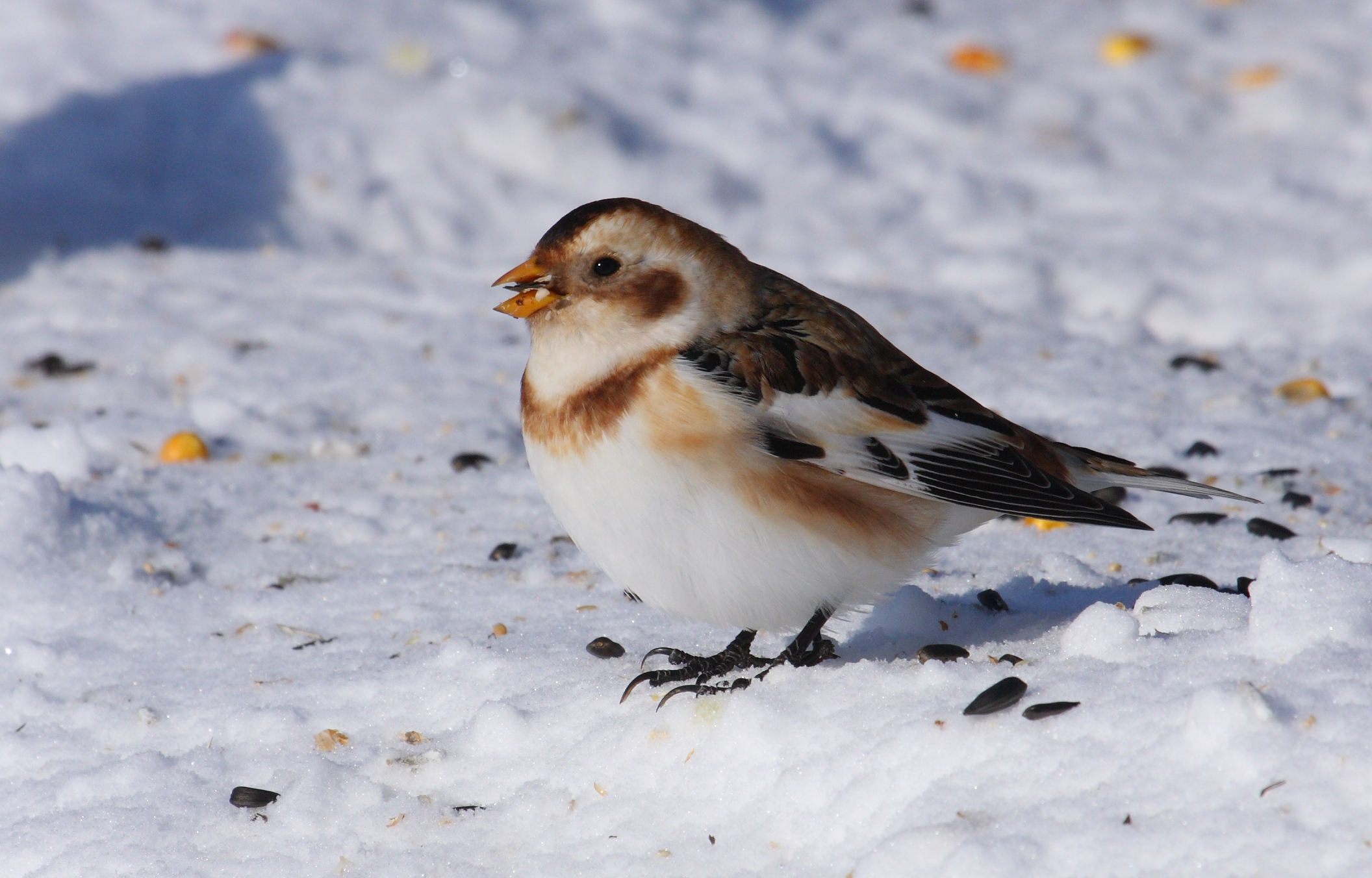
The snow bunting, another Arctic bird species breeding in the cliffs of Matusevich Fjord.

== See also ==
- List of fjords of Russia
