= October Revolution Island =

Island of the Severnaya Zemlya group in the Russian Arctic

October Revolution
Native name: остров Октябрьской Революции
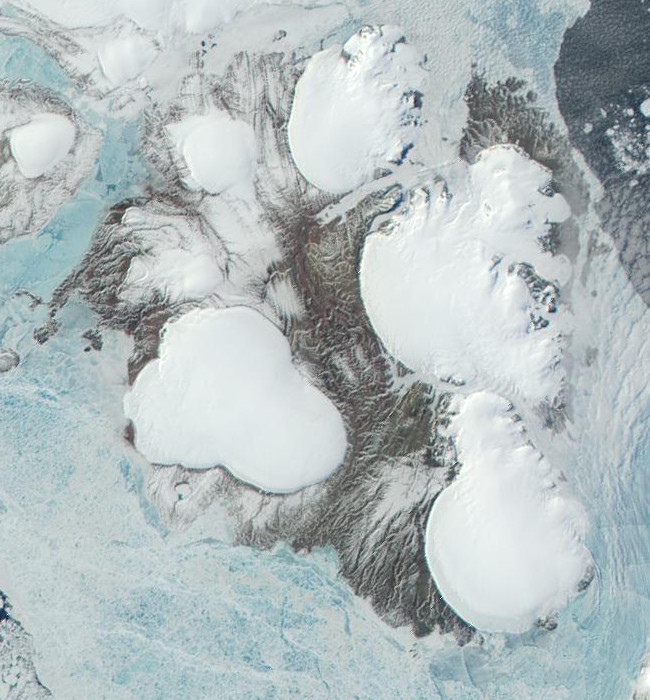
- June 2001 satellite image of October Revolution Island showing the numerous ice caps

- Location within Russia

Geography
- Location: Arctic
- Coordinates: 79°30′N 97°00′E
- Archipelago: Severnaya Zemlya
- Area: 14,170 km^{2} (5,470 sq mi)
- Area rank: 59th
- Highest elevation: 963 m (3159 ft)
- Highest point: Mount Karpinsky

Administration
- Russia
- Krai: Krasnoyarsk Krai

Demographics
- Population: 0

October Revolution Island, Severnaya Zemlya.

October Revolution Island (Russian: остров Октябрьской Революции, ostrov Oktyabrskoy Revolyutsii) is the largest island of the Severnaya Zemlya group in Russia in the Arctic. It is named after the October Revolution which overthrew the Russian Republic and created the communist Soviet Union in its place.

The area of this island has been estimated at 14,170 km^{2} (5,470 sq mi) making it the 59th largest island in the world. It rises to a height of 965 m (3,166 ft) on Mount Karpinsky. Half the island is covered with glaciers reaching down into the sea. In the sections free from ice, the vegetation is desert or tundra.

== Geography ==
October Revolution Island houses five domed ice caps; clockwise from north, they are named: Rusanov, Karpinsky, University, Vavilov and Albanov. The Rusanov and Karpinsky ice caps, located on the eastern side of the island, feed with glaciers the Matusevich Fjord of the Laptev Sea and the Marat Fjord of the Shokalsky Strait. The Karpinsky ice cap reaches a maximum height of 963 m and it is also the highest point in Severnaya Zemlya.

In 2015 the Vavilov Glacier accelerated dramatically due to warming. Between 2015 and 2016 the glacier front advanced 4 km and the glacier lost 4.5 km^{3} of ice.

Other minor ice caps on the island include the Malyutka Glacier. The Podemnaya River and the Bolshaya River drain to the northwest between the Vavilov and Albanov glaciers, and the Bedovaya and Obryvistaya Rivers drain to the north between the Albanov and Rusanov ice caps.

The coast of the island is uneven with rugged coves and headlands. The largest bays of the island are along the northern coast. The Red Army Strait separates October Revolution Island from Komsomolets Island to the north and from Pioneer Island in the northwest, while the broader Shokalsky Strait separates it from Bolshevik Island to the south. Both straits connect the Kara Sea in the west with the Laptev Sea in the east. Cape October is located in the northern part of the island facing the Red Army Strait.

== Paleontology ==
Fossilized scales of thelodonts have been discovered on this island. Stroinolepis maenniki is described by material from the Middle and Upper Ordovician deposits of the Strojnaya River, after which it was named. Loganellia grossi, Paralogania consimilis, Thelodus calvus and Shielia multispinata were found in the younger Wenlock deposits of the Silurian. Conodonts were also collected from October Revolution Island. Aphelognathus sp. is dated to the Middle-Upper Ordovician, while Panderodus and Ozarkodina were discovered in Rhuddanian, Lower Silurian period.

== History ==
The island was discovered by Boris Vilkitsky in 1913 during an expedition on behalf of the Russian Hydrographic Service, but its insularity was not proven until 1931, when Georgy Ushakov and Nikolay Urvantsev charted the archipelago during their 1930–1932 expedition.

The Vavilov Meteorological Station was operated from 1974 to 1988 on the northern part of the Vavilov Ice Cap.

The island had a nuclear-powered lighthouse installed in 1989, shortly after the closing of the weather station.

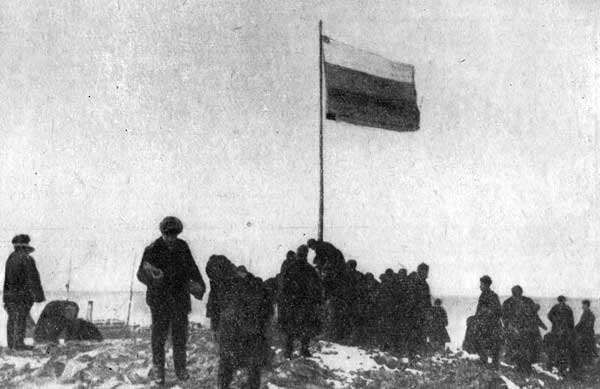
Raising of the Russian flag at Cape Berg during the 1913 Arctic Ocean Hydrographic Expedition.

== See also ==
- Arctic Ocean Hydrographic Expedition
- List of islands of Russia
- List of glaciers of Russia
