= Schmidt Island =

Island in Russia

Schmidt
Russian: остров Шмидта
- Schmidt Island, Russia.
- Interactive map of Schmidt

Geography
- Location: Arctic
- Coordinates: 81.083°N 90.417°E
- Archipelago: Severnaya Zemlya
- Area: 467 km^{2} (180 sq mi)

Administration
- Russia

Demographics
- Population: uninhabited

Schmidt Island (Russian: остров Шмидта) is one of the islands of the Severnaya Zemlya group in the Russian Arctic. It was named after Soviet scientist and first head of the Chief Directorate of the Northern Sea Route, Otto Schmidt. Located at the far northwestern end of Severnaya Zemlya, it lies slightly south of the Arctic Cape on Komsomolets Island. There is no tourism on the island except for scientists, military personnel, and a few explorers.

== Geography ==
Schmidt Island is significantly detached from the rest of Severnaya Zemlya regarding the relative proximity of the other main islands to each other.

It measures 467 km^{2} (180 sq mi) and is almost entirely covered by the Schmidt Ice Cap. Owing to its exposed position, the climate in the Schmidt Island's area is much colder than in the rest of the archipelago.

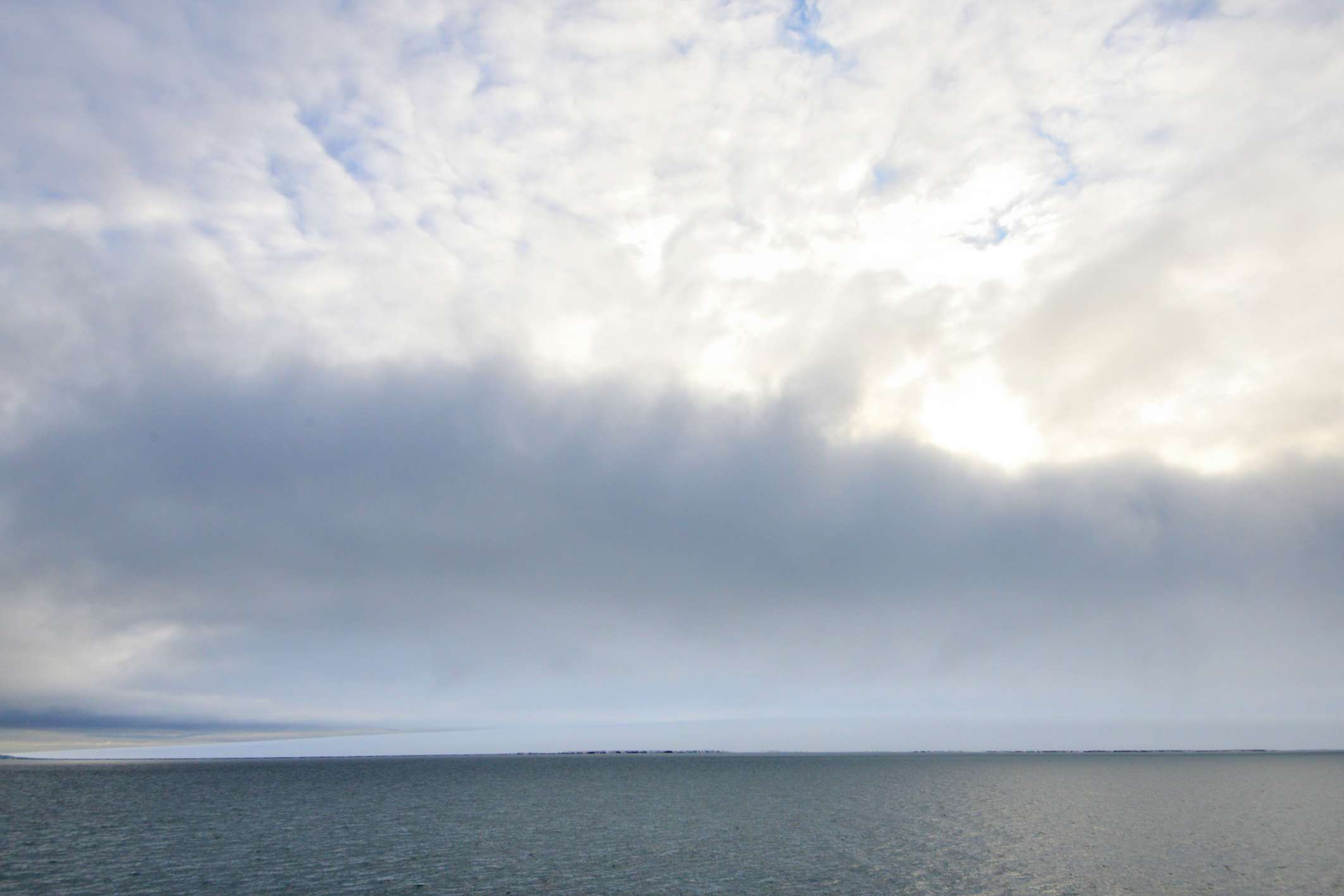
Schmidt Island (Sewernaja Semlja, 81°12’N, 91°10‘E)

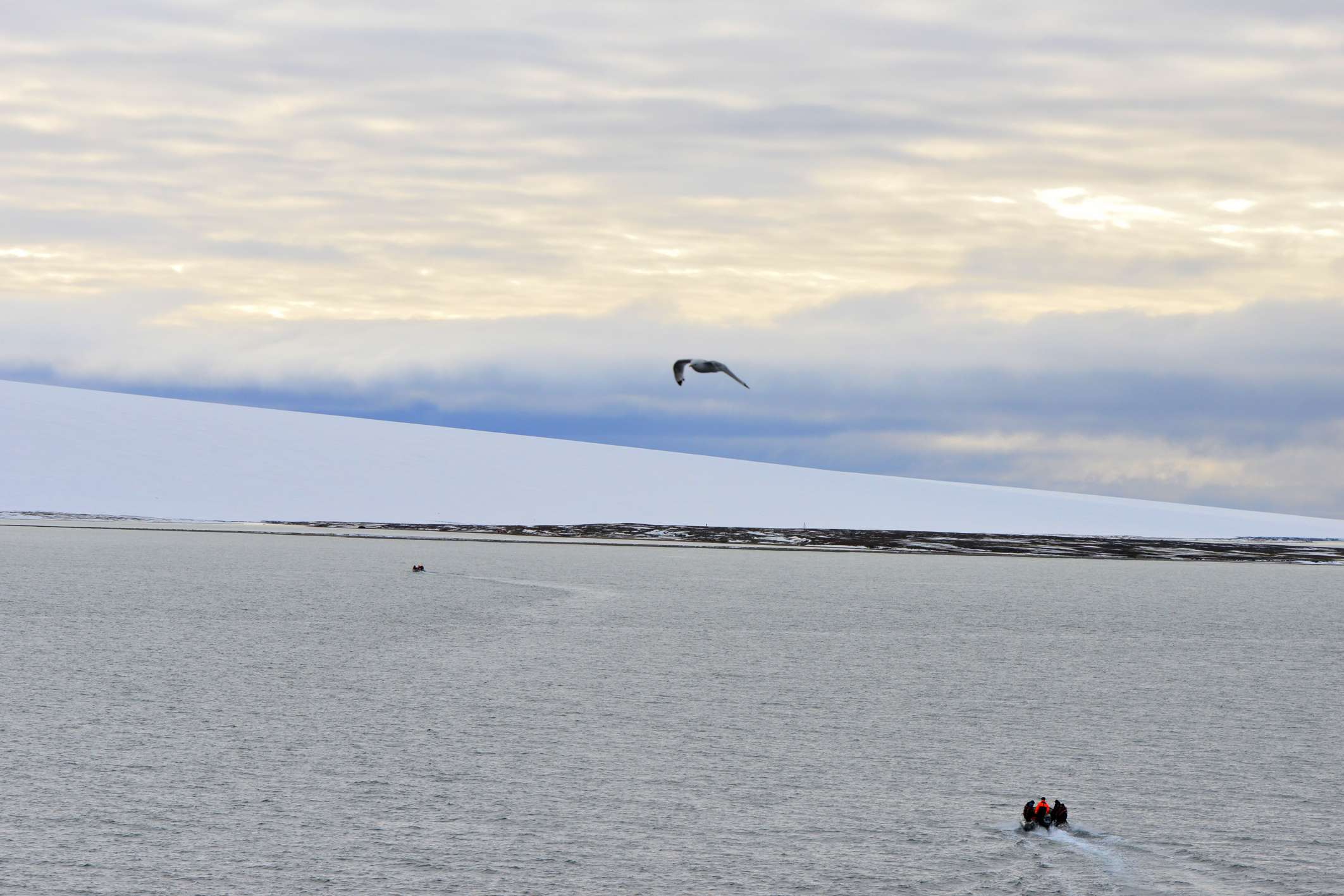
The ice cap covering Schmidt Island

== See also ==
- List of glaciers of Russia
- List of islands of Russia
- Schmidt Island, Oregon
