= Severnaya Zemlya =

Archipelago in Krasnoyarsk Krai, Russia

Native name: Северная Земля
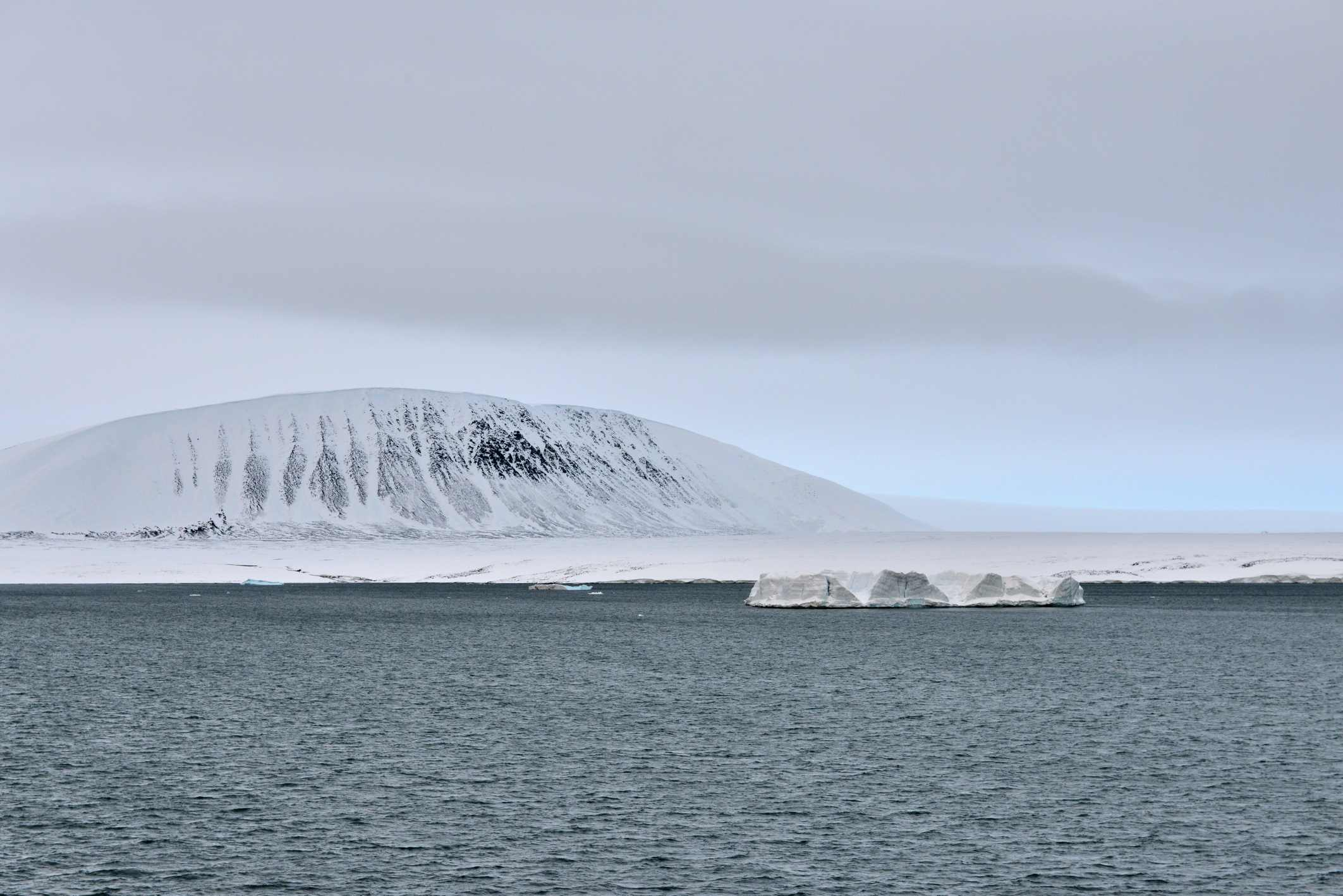
- Krenkel Bay in Komsomolets Island

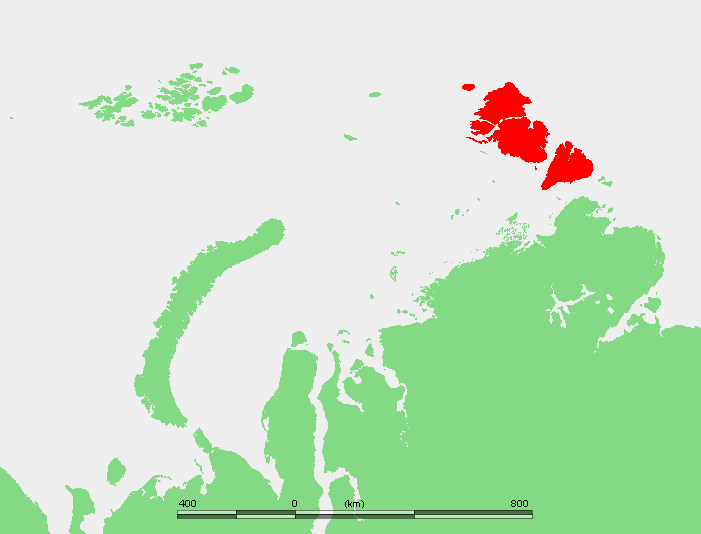
- Location of Severnaya Zemlya off northernmost continental Russia

- Location in Russia

Geography
- Location: Arctic Ocean; Kara Sea / Laptev Sea
- Coordinates: 79°30′0″N 97°15′0″E
- Major islands: October Revolution, Bolshevik, Komsomolets, Pioneer, Schmidt
- Area: 37,000 km^{2} (14,000 sq mi)
- Highest point: Mount Karpinsky (965 m (3,166 ft))

Administration
- Russian Federation
- Federal subject: Krasnoyarsk Krai
- District: Taymyrsky Dolgano-Nenetsky District

Demographics
- Population: No permanent population (2017)

Additional information
- Time zone: UTC+07:00 (Krasnoyarsk, Indochina)
  - Summer (DST): +7 (UTC)

Severnaya Zemlya (Russian: Северная Земля, lit. 'Northern Land', pronounced [ˈsʲevʲɪrnəjə zʲɪmˈlʲa]) is a 37,000 km^{2} (14,000 sq mi) archipelago in the Russian high Arctic. It lies off Siberia's Taymyr Peninsula, separated from the mainland by the Vilkitsky Strait. This archipelago separates two marginal seas of the Arctic Ocean, the Kara Sea in the west and the Laptev Sea in the east.

Severnaya Zemlya was first discovered in 1913 and first charted in 1930–1932, making it the last sizeable archipelago on Earth to be discovered and mapped. Administratively, the islands form part of Russia's Krasnoyarsk Krai. In Soviet times there were a number of research stations in different locations, but currently there are no human inhabitants in Severnaya Zemlya, except for the Prima Polar Station near Cape Baranov.

The largest glacier in the Russian Federation, the Academy of Sciences Glacier, is located in Severnaya Zemlya. Until recently, ice joined the islands to Eurasia, even at its smallest extent during the late summer melt season, blocking the Northeast Passage between the Atlantic and the Pacific. By the late summer of 2012, however, due to Arctic sea ice decline the permanent ice had reached a record low extent and open water appeared to the south of the archipelago.

== History ==
Although Severnaya Zemlya lies not far off the northern coast of Siberia, cartographers did not formally record it until the 20th century. Earlier explorers deemed that there was a land mass in the general area, such as in the report by Matvei Gedenschtrom and Yakov Sannikov made in 1810 at the time of their exploration of the New Siberian Islands.

Later in the 19th century, Adolf Erik Nordenskiöld during the Vega expedition sailed very close to this land in 1878 but did not notice it. In 1882, the Danish Arctic explorer and naval officer Andreas Peter Hovgaard, leader of the Arctic survey Dijmphna expedition, set himself the goal of discovering land north of Cape Chelyuskin and exploring the unknown northeastern limits of the Kara Sea. However, Hovgaard was prevented from accomplishing his objectives after having become trapped in thick ice, and his expedition was unable to reach even the shores of the Taymyr Peninsula.

Even at the end of the 19th century, both Nansen's Fram expedition of 1895 and Eduard Toll's Russian polar expedition of 1900–02 on the ship Zarya failed to note any traces of land to the north of the 55 km-wide (34 mi) strait between the Kara Sea and the Laptev Sea that they navigated.

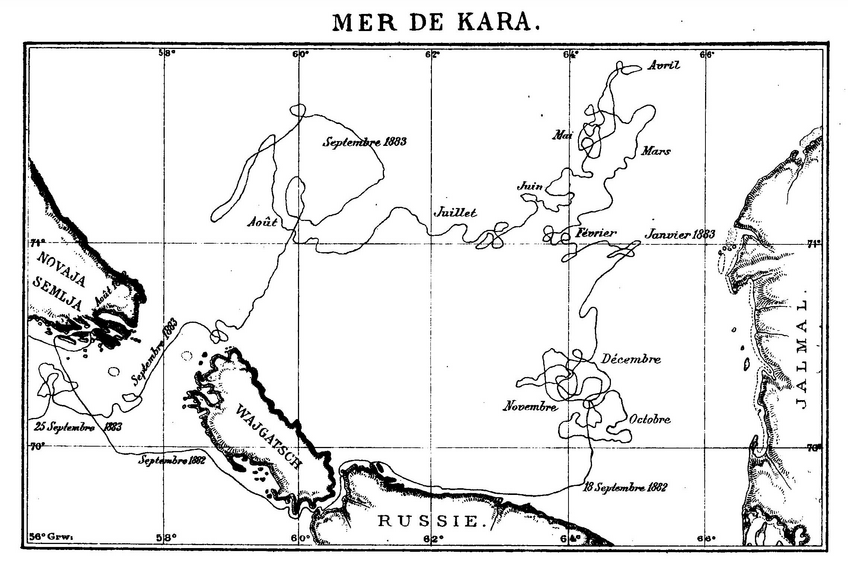
Map of the Kara Sea drift of steamship Dijmphna in 1882–83. This venture would have discovered the land now known as Severnaya Zemlya had it been successful.

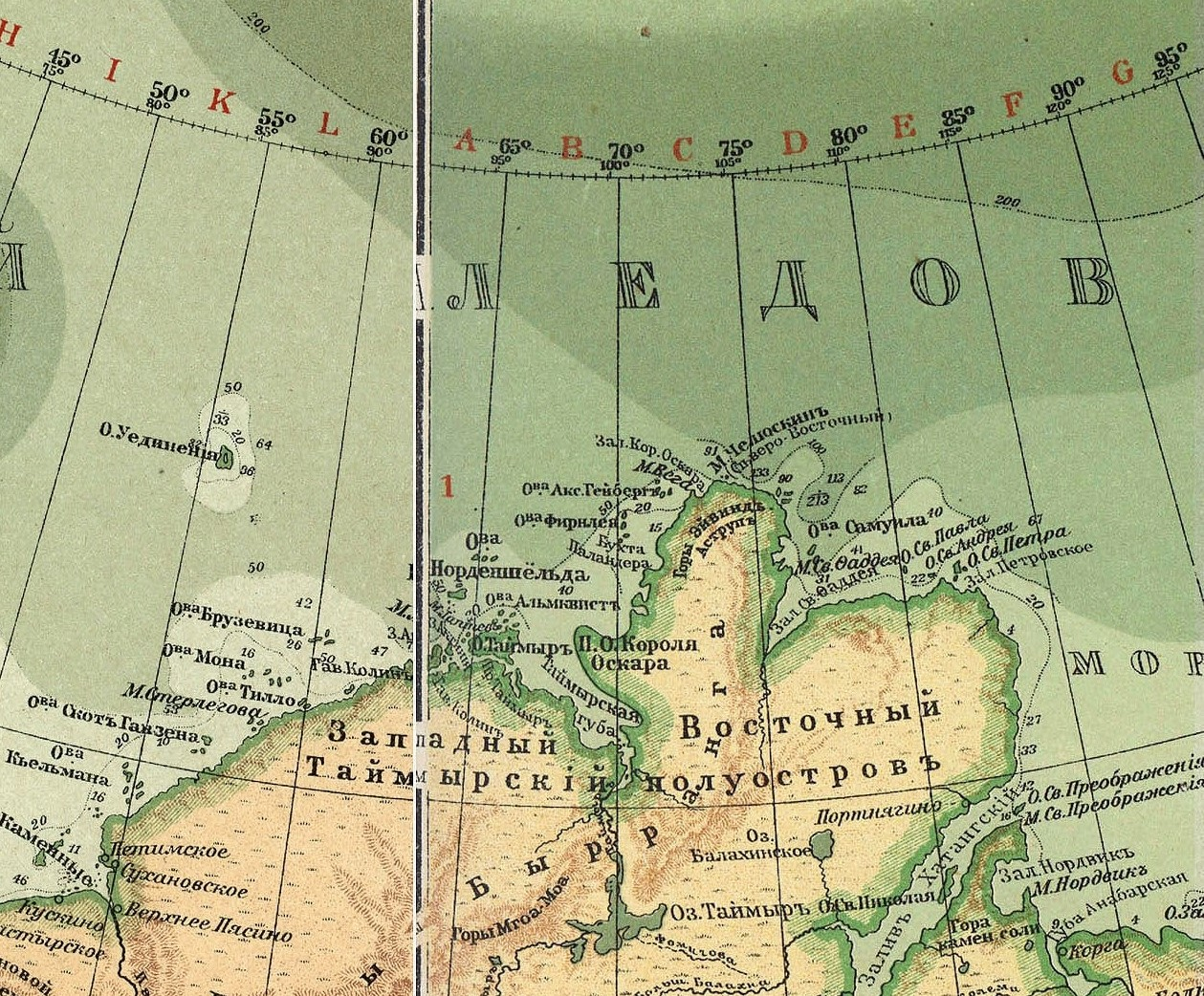
c. 1902 map section of the Yeniseysk Governorate with empty ocean in the location of the archipelago

=== Emperor Nicholas II Land ===
The archipelago first appeared on the map with the 1913–1915 Arctic Ocean Hydrographic Expedition of the icebreakers Taimyr and Vaigach. The chief organiser and first captain of the Vaygach was officer Aleksandr Vasiliyevich Kolchak of the Imperial Russian Navy. The expedition, privately financed, was launched in 1910 and led by Boris Vilkitsky on behalf of the Russian Hydrographic Service. This venture accomplished its goal of exploring the uncharted areas of the continental side of the Northern Sea Route.

On 3 September 1913 (22 August 1913 in the Julian calendar used by Russia at the time), members of Vilkitsky's expedition landed on what is now known as Cape Berg on present-day October Revolution Island. They raised the Russian flag on the shore and named the new territory Tayvay Land (Russian: Земля Тайвай, Zemlya Tayvay), after the first syllable of each of their icebreakers' names. During the days that followed, Vilkitsky's expedition charted parts of the Laptev Sea coast of what they believed to be a single island. Barely six months later, in early 1914, by order of the Secretary of the Imperial Navy, the new discovery was renamed Emperor Nicholas II Land (Russian: Земля Императора Николая II, Zemlya Imperatora Nikolaya II), after the ruling Emperor Nicholas II of Russia.

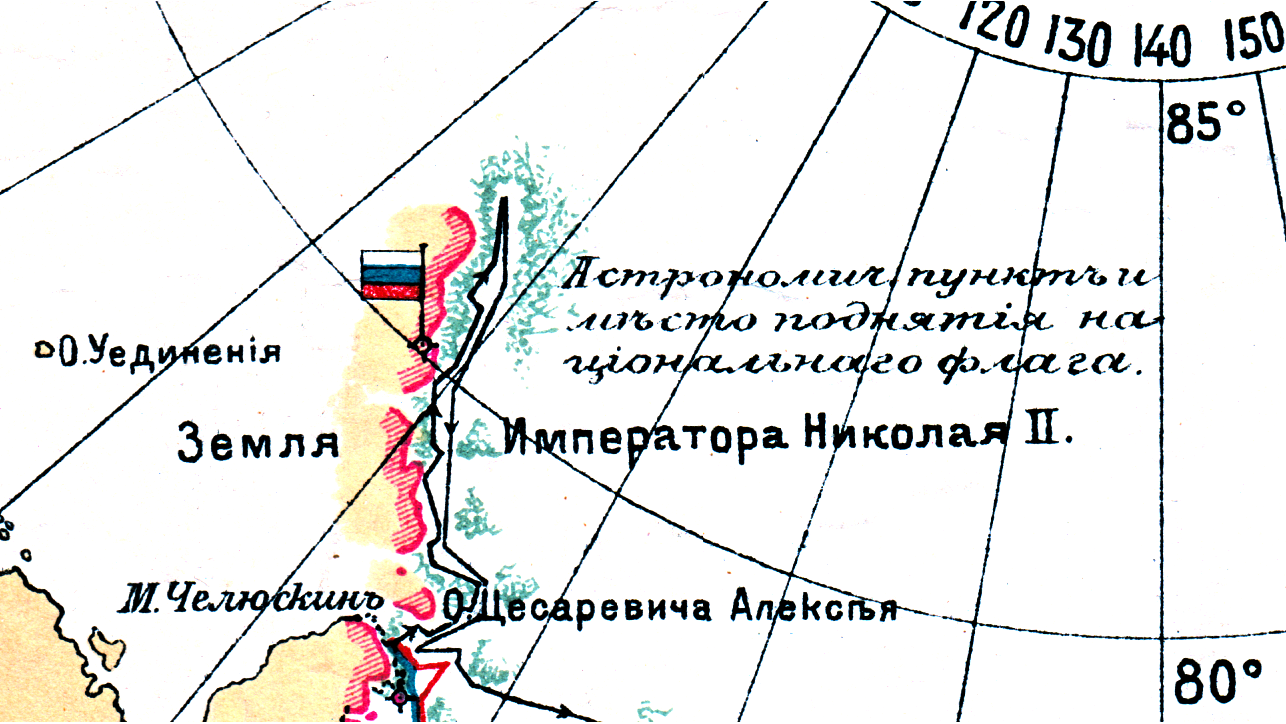
Section of the 1913 Arctic Ocean Hydrographic Expedition map showing incompletely charted Emperor Nicholas II Land —with an undefined western coast. The Russian flag stands on the Cape Berg area.

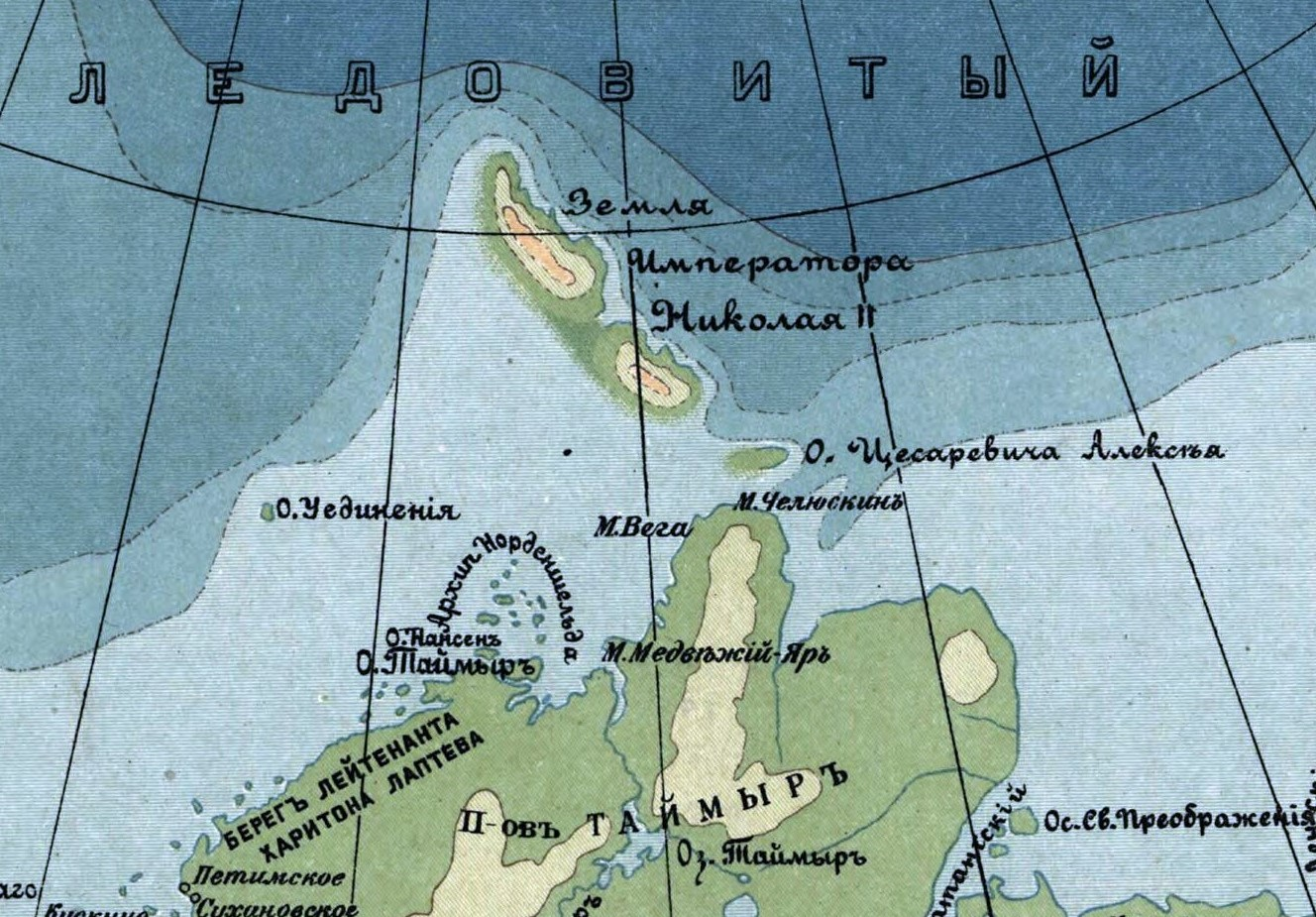
Partly surveyed Emperor Nicholas II Land in a 1915 map of the Russian Empire. At the time it was believed that the archipelago formed a single landmass.

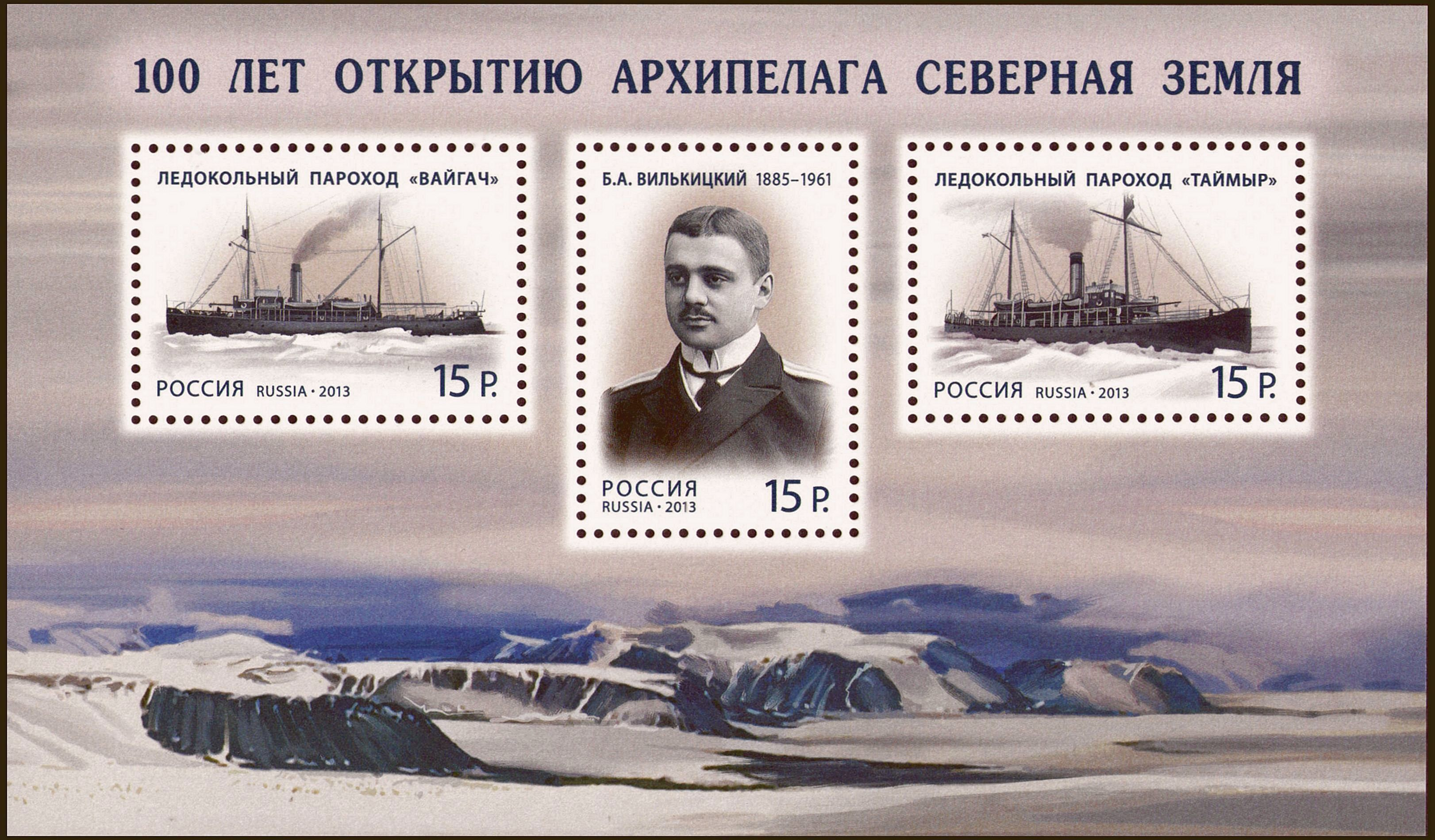
Russian 2013 stamp set featuring Boris Vilkitsky, his ships and the landscape of the area - dedicated to the 100th anniversary of the discovery of Severnaya Zemlya.

=== Later exploration and present era ===
In 1926, the Presidium of the Central Executive Committee of the USSR renamed the still not fully-explored land Severnaya Zemlya. In May 1928, Umberto Nobile and his crew in the Airship Italia attempted to overfly the islands, but adverse weather conditions forced them to turn southward when only an hour or two from viewing the archipelago's coastline.

In the spring of 1931, Georgy Ushakov, accompanied by the geologist Nikolay Urvantsev, the veteran surveyor Sergei Zhuravlev, and the radio-operator Vasily Khodov, thoroughly surveyed Severnaya Zemlya during a two-year expedition to the archipelago. Ushakov and his team established a small base at Golomyanny – the western end of Sredniy Island, off October Revolution Island's western coast. From there they made multiple surveying-trips into the interior and to the coastlines of the larger islands. The first detailed map drawn by the expedition's cartographers showed Severnaya Zemlya divided into four main islands. Geographic features of the territory were named after communist organisations, events, and personalities. With reference to Severnaya Zemlya Ushakov wrote:

I have seen God-forsaken Chukotka Peninsula, blizzard-ridden Wrangel Island, twice visited fog-enshrouded Novaya Zemlya, and I have seen Franz Josef Land with its enamel sky and proud cliffs garbed in blue, hardened glacial streams, but nowhere did I witness such grimness or such depressing, lifeless relief...

The Graf Zeppelin flew over the area during its polar flight of July 1931 and recorded some cartographic and meteorological data; Hugo Eckener tried to take pictures of the yet unsurveyed western coast, but it was obscured by fog and clouds.

Although German communists had endured suffering under the Third Reich, due to anti-German sentiment caused by the 1941–1945 German-Soviet War in the USSR some features of Severnaya Zemlya that had been previously named in solidarity with German Communism were given Russian or neutral-sounding names, e.g. Cape Unslicht becoming Mys Peschanyy and Proliv Yungshturm becoming Yuny Strait.

During the period of the Cold War (1940s to 1980s), the islands of Severnaya Zemlya continued to be studied by a team of geologists from NIIGA (the Scientific Research Institute of Arctic Geology) in St. Petersburg, (then known as Leningrad). Between 1948 and 1954 a comprehensive geological map was compiled under B. Kh. Egiazarov. Also more accurate maps were drawn by means of cartographic data gathered from aerial-photography surveys.

Administratively, Severnaya Zemlya formed part of the Taymyr Autonomous Okrug until this okrug was merged into Krasnoyarsk Krai on 1 January 2007. As of 2021 it belongs to the Taymyrsky Dolgano-Nenetsky District of Krasnoyarsk Krai. There has been a request at the Krasnoyarsk Krai Legislative Assembly to reinstate the former name of Severnaya Zemlya as "Emperor Nicholas II Land" (Russian: Земля Николая II). This request, however, has been rejected by the local government for the time being.

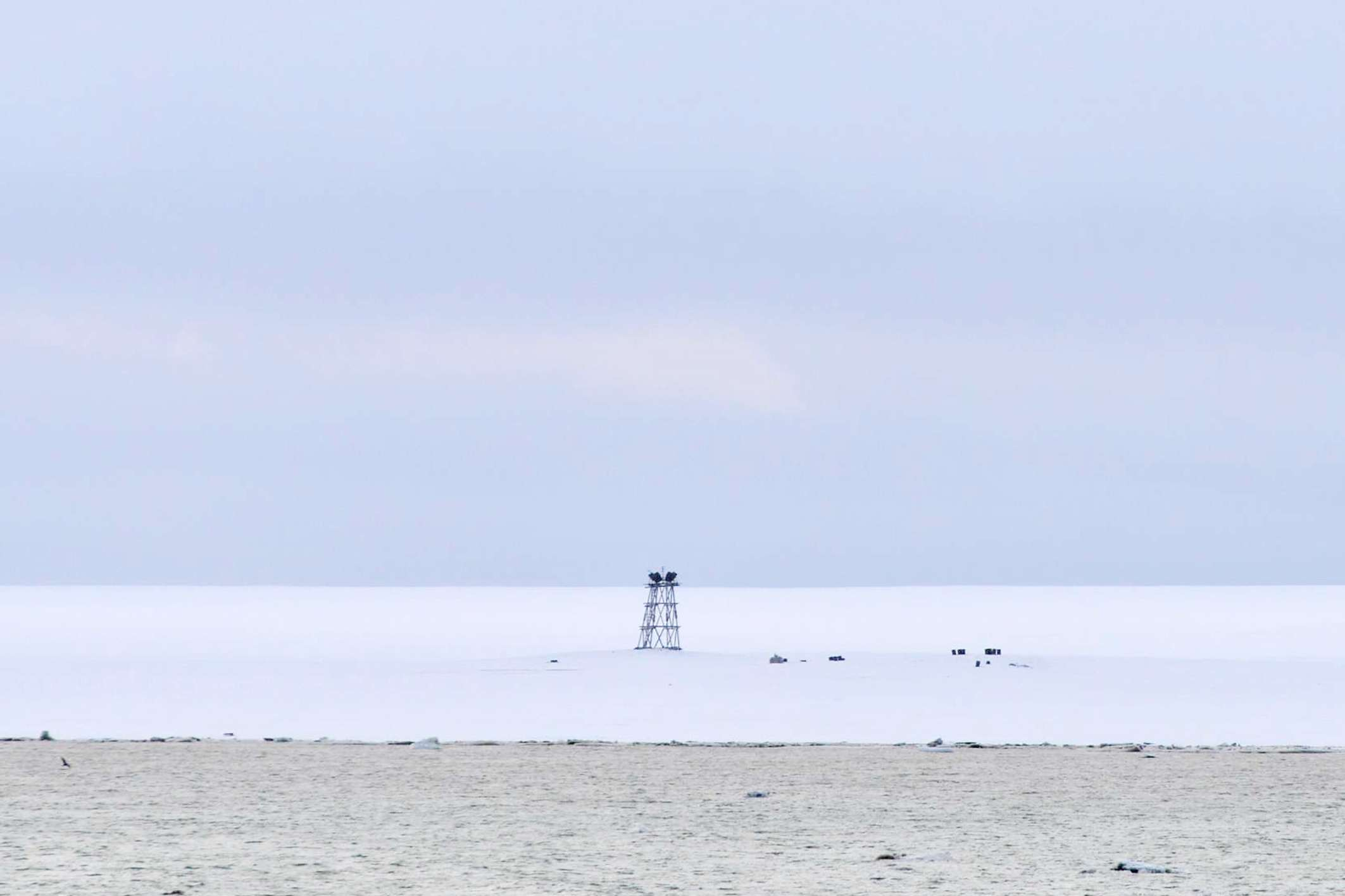
View of the remains of abandoned Izluchina Russian polar station at the northern end of Komsomolets Island

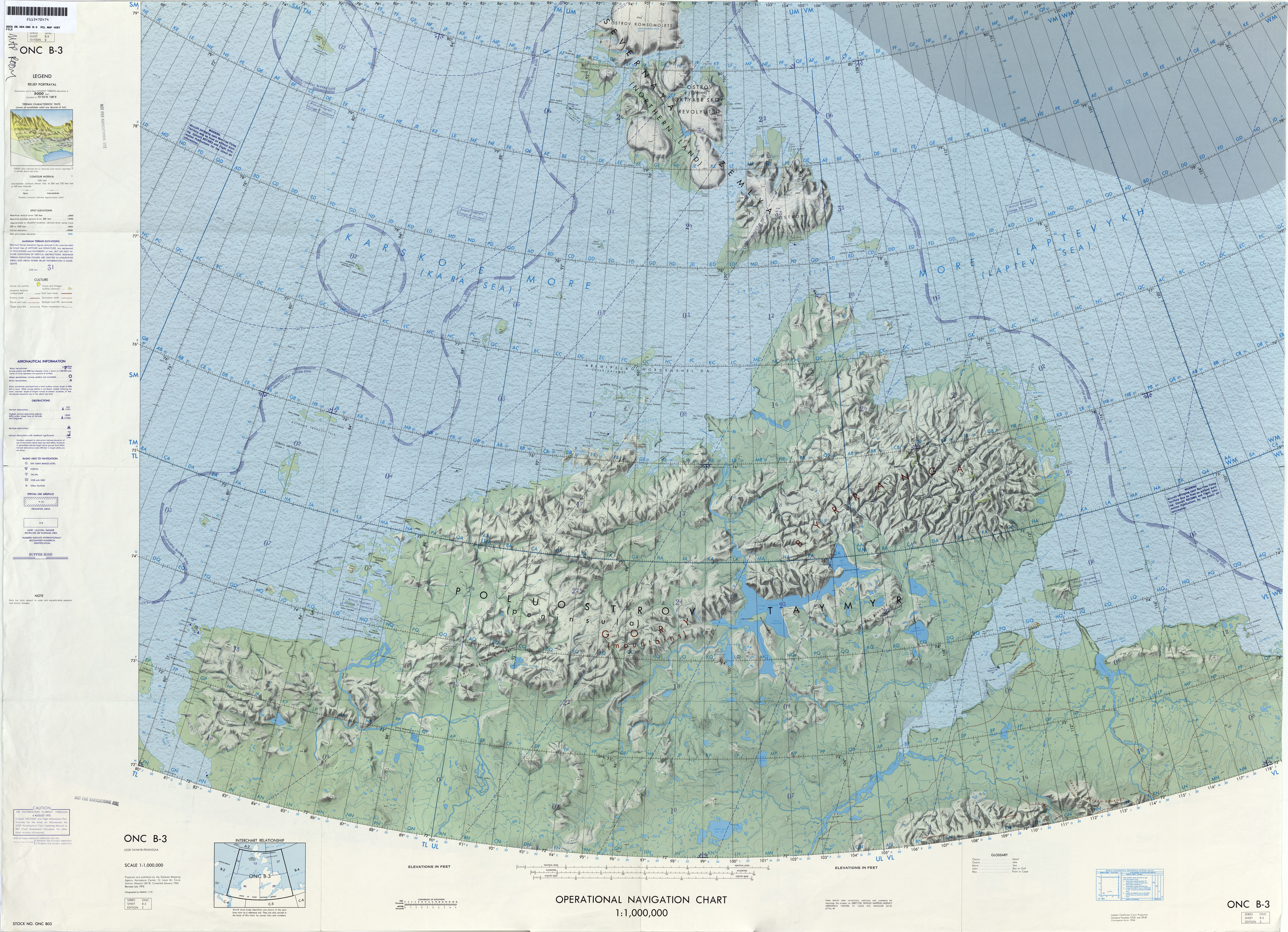
1975 map showing Severnaya Zemlya and the Taymyr Peninsula

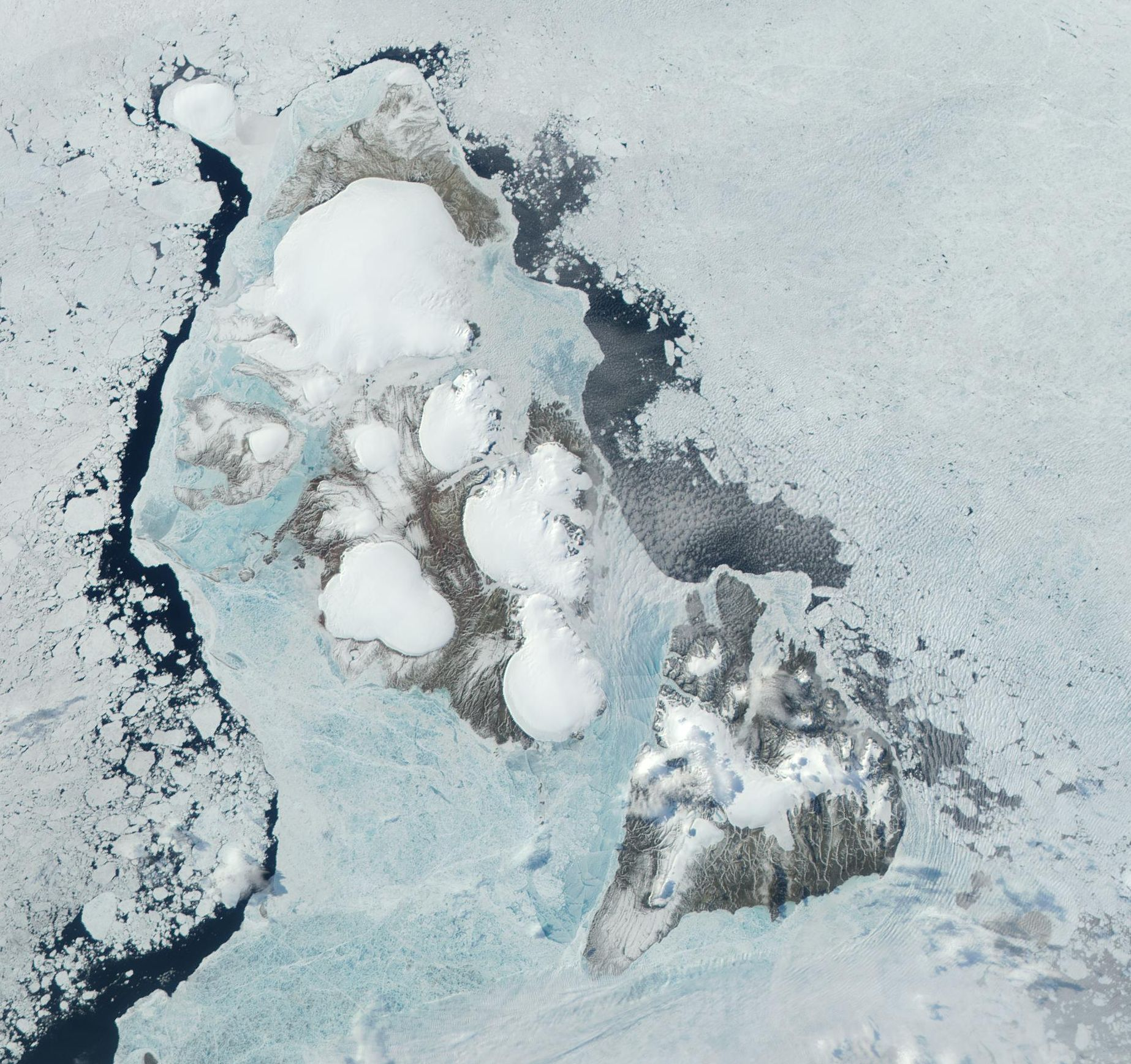
Terra-MODIS image of Severnaya Zemlya in 2001

== Geography ==
Severnaya Zemlya, Russia

Severnaya Zemlya comprises four major islands – October Revolution, Bolshevik, Komsomolets, and Pioneer – and around 70 smaller islands, covering a total area of about 37,000 km^{2} (14,300 sq mi). It is separated from the Taymyr Peninsula by the Vilkitsky Strait. Komsomolets is separated from Canada's northernmost point, Cape Columbia, by under 2000 km.

Four of the main islands are largely glaciated, October Revolution, Komsomolets, and Pioneer, as well as the smaller Schmidt Island at the northwestern limit. The glacierised area on Bolshevik, the southernmost main island of the group, covers about a quarter of its land's surface. The southmost point of Severnaya Zemlya is Cape Neupokoyev at the SW end of Bolshevik Island. The highest point of the archipelago is 965 m (3,166 ft) Mount Karpinsky, the summit of the Karpinsky Glacier, an ice dome on October Revolution Island. The Red Army Strait separates Komsomolets Island from October Revolution Island and the broader Shokalsky Strait Bolshevik Island from October Revolution Island. Both straits connect the Kara Sea in the west with the Laptev Sea in the east.

This archipelago encloses the northern limits of the Kara Sea on its western shores, together with Novaya Zemlya, located roughly 1,000 km (620 mi) to the southwest. The large rivers Ob and Yenisei, among others, flow from the south into this marginal sea area of the Arctic Ocean, with their abundant waters contributing to a climate with relatively high precipitation despite the prevalent extreme cold temperatures of the high latitude. The Laptev Sea, where the mighty Lena River steadily expands its large delta, lies to the east of Severnaya Zemlya. The topographic relief of the archipelago is quite smooth, with Neoproterozoic and Palaeozoic sedimentary successions dominating its bedrock geology.

=== Glaciers ===
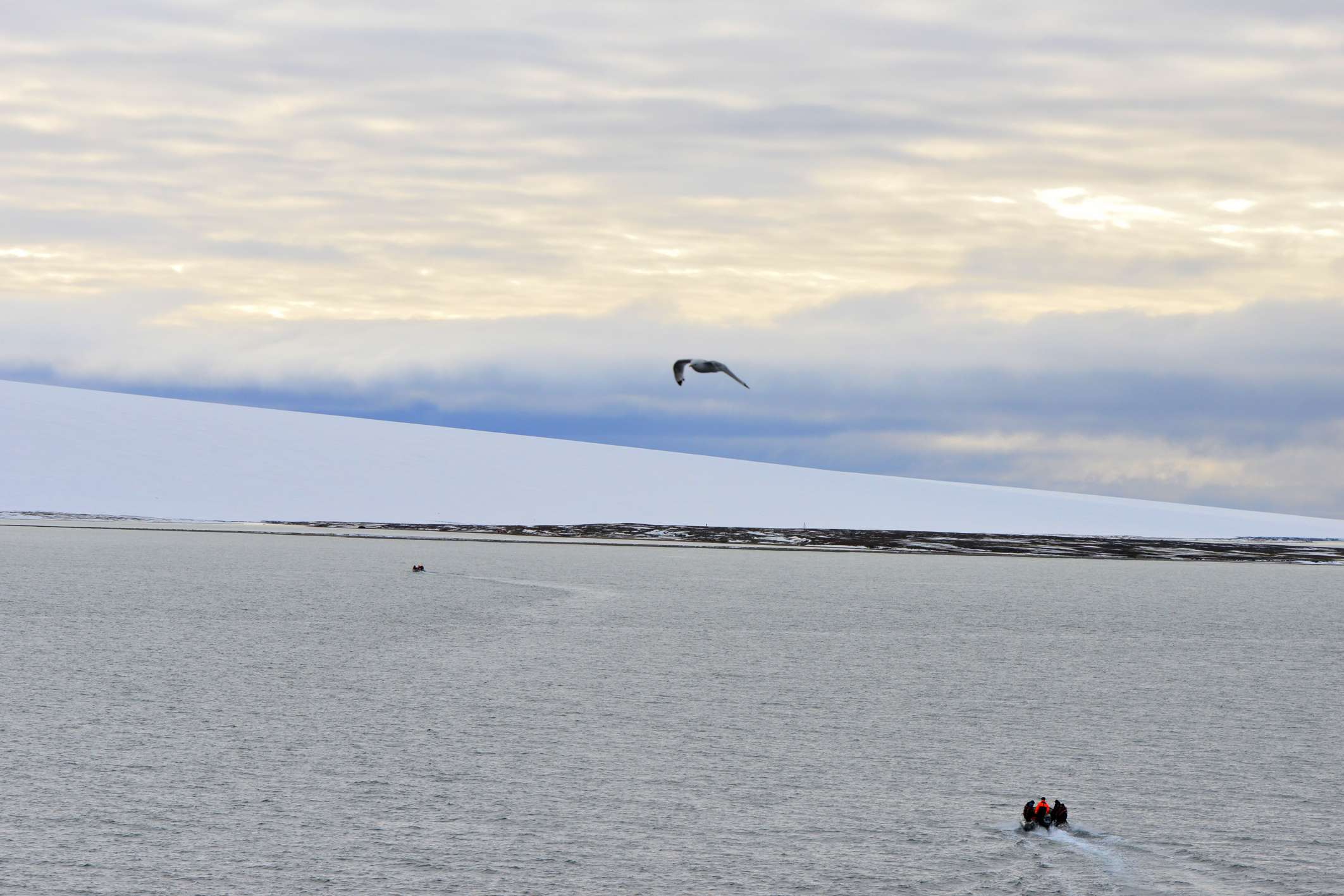
View of Schmidt Island with its ice cap.

Glaciers in the archipelago have a characteristic dome shape with a continuously decreasing surface towards their edges. Ice cliffs are found only at the base. The places where the glaciers reach the sea contribute to the formation of icebergs. The most active glacier fronts are the eastern side of the Academy of Sciences Glacier at Krenkel Bay as well as its southern side. Another quite active glacier is the Rusanov Glacier on the island of October Revolution with its terminus at Matusevich Fjord.

October Revolution, with seven glaciers, is the island with most individual glaciers in Severnaya Zemlya. Next are the islands of Bolshevik with six, Komsomolets with four, Pioneer with two and Schmidt Island with one. The largest glacier is the Academy of Sciences Glacier in Komsomolets, which is also the largest ice cap of Russia —a 5,575 km^{2} (2,153 sq mi) and 819 m (2,687 ft) thick ice dome reaching 749 m (2,457 ft) above sea level covering about two-thirds of the surface of the island.

=== Main islands ===
==== October Revolution ====
October Revolution Island

October Revolution Island (Russian: Остров Октябрьской Революции, Ostrov Oktyabrskoy Revolyutsii) is the largest island of the Severnaya Zemlya group in the Russian Arctic.

The area of this island has been estimated at 14,170 km^{2} (5,470 sq mi) making it the 59th largest island in the world. It rises to a height of 965 m (3,166 ft) on Mount Karpinsky. Half the island is covered with glaciers reaching down into the sea. In the sections free from ice, the vegetation is desert or tundra. The island was first explored and named by the expedition of G.A. Ushakov and Nikolay N. Urvantsev in 1930–32.

October Revolution Island houses five domed ice caps; clockwise from north, they are named: Rusanov, Karpinsky, University, Vavilov and Albanov. The Vavilov Meteorological Station was operated from 1974 to 1988 on the northern part of the Vavilov Ice Cap. Other minor ice caps on the island include the Mal'yutka Glacier. The Podemnaya River and the Bolshaya River drain to the northwest between the Vavilov and Albanov glaciers, and the Bedovaya and Obryvistaya Rivers drain to the north between Albanov and Rusanov. The largest lake of the island and the entire archipelago, Fiordovoye, is located on the southwestern edge of the Karpinsky glacier. To the east and south of the island are the large Matusevich Fjord and the smaller Marat Fjord. They, together with the lake, encircle the Karpinsky ice cap. Cape October is located in the northern part of the island facing the Red Army Strait.

Ostrov Vysokiy is an islet located in a small bay on October Revolution Island's southwest shores.

==== Bolshevik ====
Bolshevik Island

Bolshevik Island (Russian: о́стров Большеви́к, pronounced [ˈostrəv bəlʲʂɨˈvʲik]) is the southernmost and second largest island in the group, located across the Shokalsky Strait from October Revolution Island. The area of this island has been estimated at 11,312 km^{2} (4,370 sq mi).

Bolshevik Island is mountainous, reaching a height of 935 m (3,068 ft). It houses an Arctic base named Prima near Cape Baranov.

Parts of the shore of the island are deeply indented, with Mikoyan Bay in the north and Solnechny Bay in the south, as well as fjords such as the large Akhmatov Fjord, and the smaller Thaelmann Fjord, Spartak Fjord and Partizan Fjord.

Bolshevik Island is comparatively less glaciated than the other islands of Severnaya Zemlya. Only about 30% of the island is covered by glaciers while the coastal plains have a sparse vegetation of moss and lichen. The Leningrad Glacier, Semyonov-Tyan-Shansky Glacier, Kropotkin Glacier, Mushketov Glacier and Aerosyomki Glacier are located in the interior of the island and do not reach the sea.

Ostrov Tash is a small island located on Bolshevik's southern shore. Lavrov Island is located off the NE shore and Ostrov Lishniy off its northern tip.

==== Komsomolets ====
Komsomolets Island

Komsomolets Island (Russian: остров Комсомолец) is the northernmost island of the Severnaya Zemlya group in the Russian Arctic, and the third largest island in the group. It is the 82nd largest island on earth.

The northernmost point of the island is called the Arctic Cape. This is the launching point for many Arctic expeditions.

The area of this island has been estimated at 9,006 km^{2} (3,477 sq mi). It rises to a height of 780 m (2,559 ft). Some 65% of the island is covered with glaciers. Komsomolets Island is home to the largest ice cap in Russia, the Academy of Sciences Ice Cap, which covers most of the island between Krenkel Bay in the east and Zhuravlev Bay in the west.

The soil of the island is mostly composed of loose loam and sand, a tundra desert scattered with mosses and lichens. The island was first explored and named by the expedition of Georgy Ushakov and Nikolay Urvantsev in 1930–32. In keeping with their scheme of naming the islands after events and movements of the Russian Revolution, this island was named in honour of the members of the Komsomol, the "Communist Union of Youth".

Off the northwestern shores of Komsomolets Island lies a group of islets known as Ostrova Dem'yana Bednogo.

==== Pioneer Island ====
Pioneer Island

Pioneer Island, Ostrov Pioner in Russian. It is the westernmost of the large islands of the Severnaya Zemlya group and is separated from Komsomolets Island by the Yuny Strait. Pioneer island measures 1,527 km^{2} (590 sq mi) in area.

This island houses the Pioneer Glacier. Thelodonti fossils from the Upper Silurian have been found in the island.

Off Pioneer Island's southwestern end lies Krupskoy Island. This is a fairly large island, over 20 km (12 mi) in length and about 11 km (6.8 mi) in width. The sound that separates it from Pioneer is only 0.5 km (0.31 mi) in width.

==== Schmidt Island ====
Schmidt Island

Schmidt Island, measuring 467 km^{2} (180 sq mi), is located at the far northwestern end of the archipelago. This island is quite detached from the whole Severnaya Zemlya group. It is also its northernmost island and before modern climate warming it was fully in the region of permanent sea ice.

This island is almost entirely covered by the Schmidt Ice Cap. Owing to its exposed position, the climate in the Schmidt Island's area is much colder than in the rest of the archipelago.

Schmidt Island was named after the Soviet scientist Otto Schmidt.

=== Minor islands and island groups ===
Close to the main archipelago of Severnaya Zemlya there are a number of smaller islands and archipelagos. There are also many small coastal islands and islets in different locations, such as Krupskoy to the west of Pioneer and Naydenysh (Russian: Найдёныш) near Cape Anuchin in October Revolution Island. Among the other minor islands the following deserve mention:

==== Sedov Archipelago ====
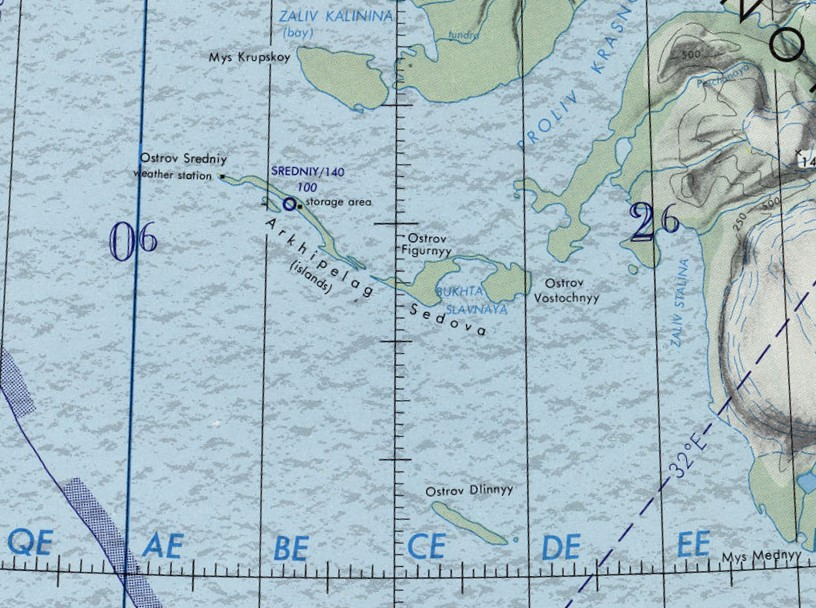
Sedov Islands

The Sedov Archipelago, formerly known as Sergey Kamenev Islands, is located just west of October Revolution Island on the Kara Sea side. The main islands of this archipelago are Sredny (the longest island), Domashnyy, Strela, and Figurnyy. Close to the shore of October Revolution Island lies Obmannyy Island and 32 km (20 mi) further offshore southwards lies Dlinnyy Island. These other coastal islands are sometimes included as part of the Sedov Group.

Golomyanniy Meteorological Station, located on the western tip of Sredniy Island at 79°33′N 90°38′E, was the wintering site and base of the 1931–32 expedition and has been taking continuous measurements since 1954.

An official request has been forwarded to rename Domashnyy Island as Svyatoy Anastasii (остров Святой Анастасии), St. Anastasia Island.

==== Krasnoflotskiye Islands ====
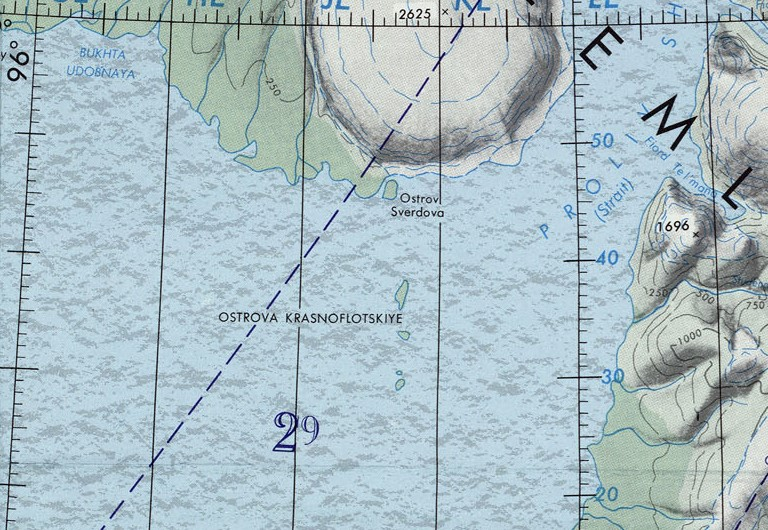
Krasnoflotskiye

Located just south of October Revolution Island in the Kara Sea. The Krasnoflotskiye Islands (Russian: Краснофлотские) extend from north to south in an almost straight line 78°36′N 98°40′E. The main islands are Sverdlova – very close to Cape Sverdlov on the coast, Bolshoy – not much larger than the others despite its name, Sredniy and Greben far offshore. All islands are devoid of vegetation.

Two small islets named Opasnye, which are also part of this group, lie 35 km (19 nmi; 22 mi) to the southwest of Greben Island.

The Krasnoflotskiye Islands were first sighted and mapped in August 1932 by the expedition of the All-Union Arctic Institute on the icebreaker Rusanov. There is an Arctic Station in the Krasnoflotskiye Islands (AS-042), which has been operating since 1953.

==== Maly Taymyr and Starokadomsky ====
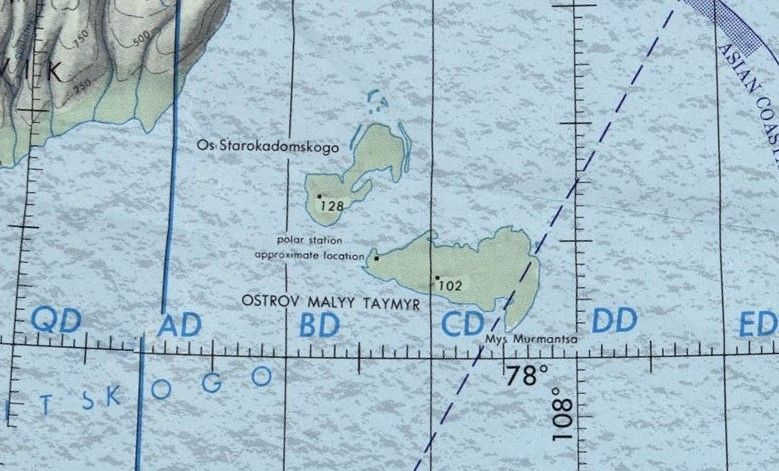
Maly Taymyr group

This is a small group including two main islands located in the Laptev Sea, off the far southeastern end of Bolshevik Island. Maly Taymyr, the largest island, has a land surface of 232 km^{2} or 90 sq mi and is at 78°07′N 107°15′E.

Maly Taymyr was discovered by Boris Vilkitsky during the Arctic Ocean Hydrographic Expedition in 1913 and was named "Tsarevich Alexei Island" (Russian: Остров Цесаревича Алексея), after the son of Zar Nicholas II of Russia. Following the 1917 October Revolution the island was renamed "Maly Taymyr". In 2005 an official request was forwarded to the local government in Krasnoyarsk Krai in order to reinstate its former name to the island as Alexei Island.

Starokadomsky Island is close by to Maly Taymyr, located off its northwestern side and separated from it by a narrow six km-wide (3.7 mi) sound. This island was named after Dr. Leonid Starokadomsky, one of the leaders of the 1913 Arctic Ocean Hydrographic Expedition.

==== Lishniy Island ====
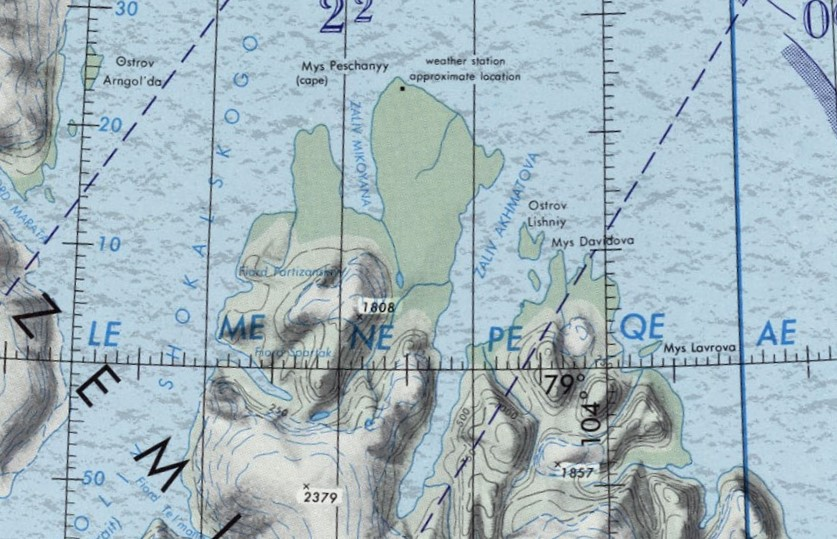
Lishny Island

Lishniy Island (Russian: Лишний) is a coastal island located on the eastern side of the mouth of Akhmatov Fjord, southeast of Cape Unslicht, off Bolshevik Island's northern end at 79°11′N 103°24′E. The island has an irregular shape and is 6 km (4 mi) long with a maximum width of 3.5 km (2.2 mi).

A deep round lake with a diameter of 700 m (2,300 ft) is located in the western part of the island and is connected to the sea by a small channel. Almost all the island is rocky, except for the northwestern part. The highest point of Lishniy Island is 27 m (89 ft)

South of Lishniy lies Yuzhnyy, a smaller island, and two islets. Lishniy off Severnaya Zemlya should not be confused with Lishny Island off Toll Bay, south of the Firnley Islands.

== Climate ==
Severnaya Zemlya is consistently cold and quite dry (Köppen ET bordering on EF), with a mean annual temperature of −14.8 °C (5.4 °F), mean annual precipitation of about 420 mm (16.5 in), and generally overcast skies. Monthly average temperature ranges from −28 °C (−18.4 °F) in February to 1 °C (33.8 °F) in July. The archipelago sees large temperature fluctuations during winter months, as low-pressure cyclonic activity originating in the North Atlantic make their way across the Arctic, bringing precipitation and higher temperatures. These cyclones are most common in September and October, which see 30% of annual precipitation. Snowfall in summer is common as temperatures hover around 0 °C (32 °F), although higher temperatures occur when warm air masses move north from Siberia.

Climate data for Golomyanniy Meteorological Station
Month	Jan	Feb	Mar	Apr	May	Jun	Jul	Aug	Sep	Oct	Nov	Dec	Year
Record high °C (°F)	0.1 (32.2)	−1.1 (30.0)	0.4 (32.7)	1.0 (33.8)	3.2 (37.8)	8.3 (46.9)	13.3 (55.9)	10.0 (50.0)	5.8 (42.4)	4.0 (39.2)	0.8 (33.4)	0.2 (32.4)	13.3 (55.9)
Mean daily maximum °C (°F)	−23.5 (−10.3)	−24.2 (−11.6)	−23.3 (−9.9)	−16.6 (2.1)	−7.2 (19.0)	−0.1 (31.8)	1.9 (35.4)	1.4 (34.5)	−1.7 (28.9)	−8.8 (16.2)	−17.3 (0.9)	−21.9 (−7.4)	−11.8 (10.8)
Daily mean °C (°F)	−27.0 (−16.6)	−27.7 (−17.9)	−26.8 (−16.2)	−19.9 (−3.8)	−9.6 (14.7)	−1.5 (29.3)	0.7 (33.3)	0.2 (32.4)	−3.3 (26.1)	−11.4 (11.5)	−20.6 (−5.1)	−25.3 (−13.5)	−14.3 (6.2)
Mean daily minimum °C (°F)	−30.5 (−22.9)	−31.1 (−24.0)	−30.3 (−22.5)	−23.1 (−9.6)	−11.9 (10.6)	−2.8 (27.0)	−0.4 (31.3)	−1.0 (30.2)	−4.9 (23.2)	−14.0 (6.8)	−23.8 (−10.8)	−28.6 (−19.5)	−16.9 (1.6)
Record low °C (°F)	−48.4 (−55.1)	−47.2 (−53.0)	−50.7 (−59.3)	−41.8 (−43.2)	−29.6 (−21.3)	−14.7 (5.5)	−5 (23)	−12 (10)	−21.1 (−6.0)	−35.7 (−32.3)	−42.8 (−45.0)	−48 (−54)	−50.7 (−59.3)
Average precipitation mm (inches)	11.1 (0.44)	8.1 (0.32)	8.7 (0.34)	8.3 (0.33)	7.7 (0.30)	14.0 (0.55)	23.2 (0.91)	24.4 (0.96)	22.1 (0.87)	14.5 (0.57)	10.0 (0.39)	10.0 (0.39)	162.1 (6.37)
Average precipitation days	15	14	15	13	20	19	17	19	21	20	14	15	202
Average rainy days	0	0	0	0	1	0	0	10	9	4	0	0	22
Average snowy days	15	14	15	13	19	17	9	12	17	20	14	15	180
Source 1: Météo climat stats (Averages and Extremes, Excluding July record high) Roshydromet (July record high)
Source 2: Weather Reports (Average rainy and snowy days)

== Flora and fauna ==
Severnaya Zemlya is a polar desert with sparse vegetation and permafrost at less than 50 cm (20 in). Rare vascular plants include species of Cerastium and Saxifraga. Non-vascular plants include the moss genera Detrichum, Dicranum, Pogonatum, Sanionia, Bryum, Orthothecium and Tortula, as well as the lichen genera Cetraria, Thamnolia, Cornicularia, Lecidea, Ochrolechia and Parmelia. Common flowering plants of the high Arctic such as the purple saxifrage (Saxifraga oppositifolia) and the Arctic poppy (Papaver radicatum) also occur on Severnaya Zemlya.

According to a survey of prior observations by De Korte, Volkov, and Gavrilo, thirty-two bird species have been observed on Severnaya Zemlya, 17 of which are known to breed on the islands. Eight species are widespread across the archipelago: five of which are colonial seabirds: little auk (Alle alle), black-legged kittiwake (Rissa tridactyla), black guillemot (Cepphus grylle), ivory gull (Pagophila eburnea), and glaucous gull (Larus hyperboreus); and three species of tundra bird: the snow bunting (Plectrophenax nivalis), purple sandpiper (Calidris maritima), and brent goose (Branta bernicla).

The most common mammal on Severnaya Zemlya is the collared lemming (Dicrostonyx torquatus), also known as Arctic lemming, which is present on all of the large islands and, in some places has been recorded to reach a density of 500 per km^{2} (1,300 per sq mi). The Arctic fox (Alopex lagopus) has been known to den on the islands, with several hundred observed in the 1980s. Other mammals occasionally observed include the wolf (Canis lupus), the polar bear (Ursus maritimus), ermine (Mustela erminea), walrus (Odobenus rosmarus), Arctic hare (Lepus timidus), and reindeer (Rangifer tarandus).

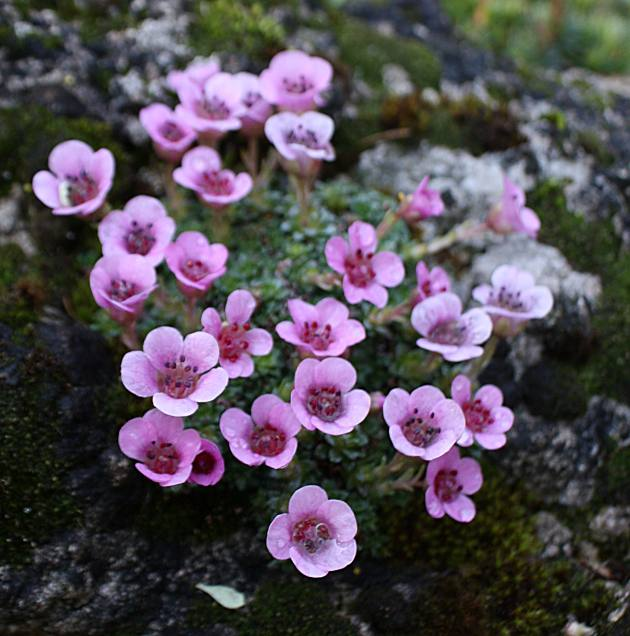
Purple saxifrage.

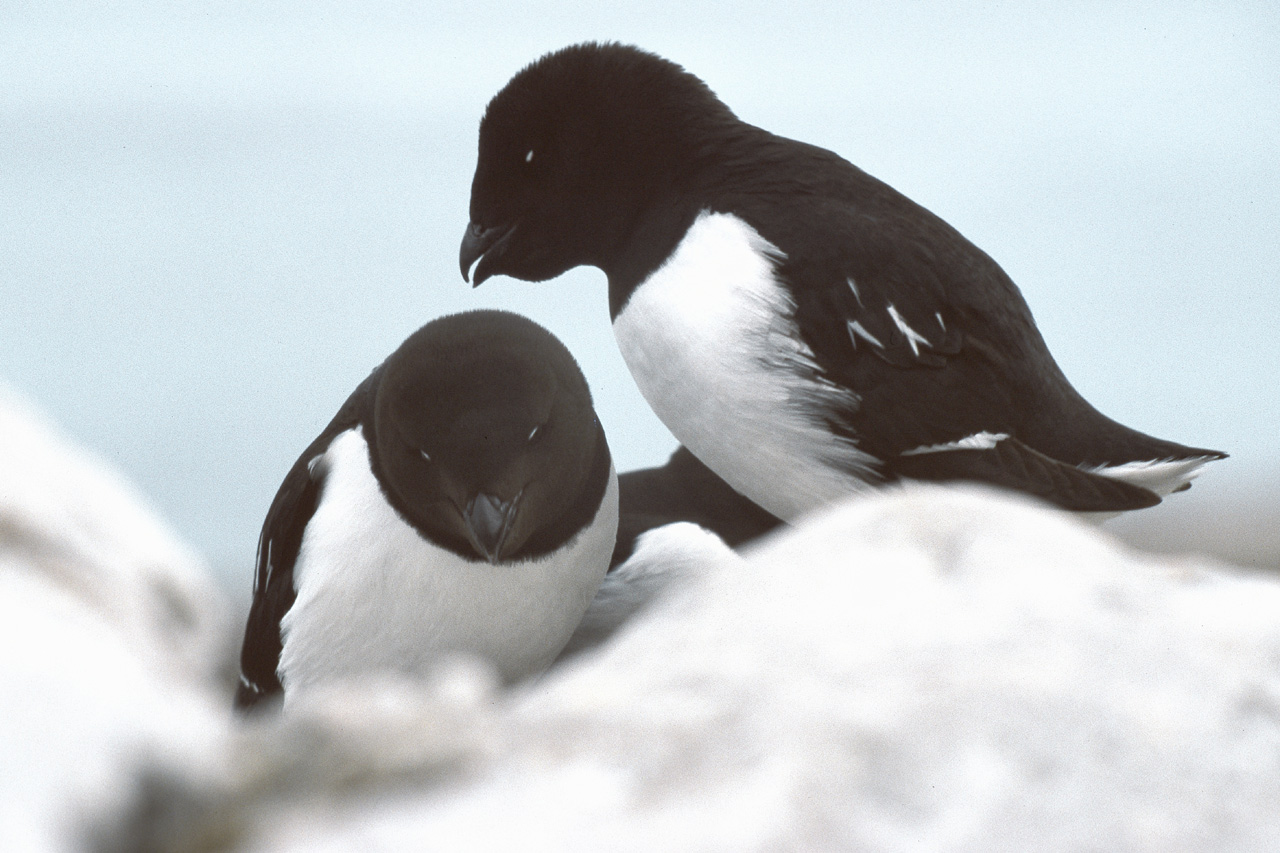
Severnaya Zemlya is the easternmost point in the little auk's breeding range.

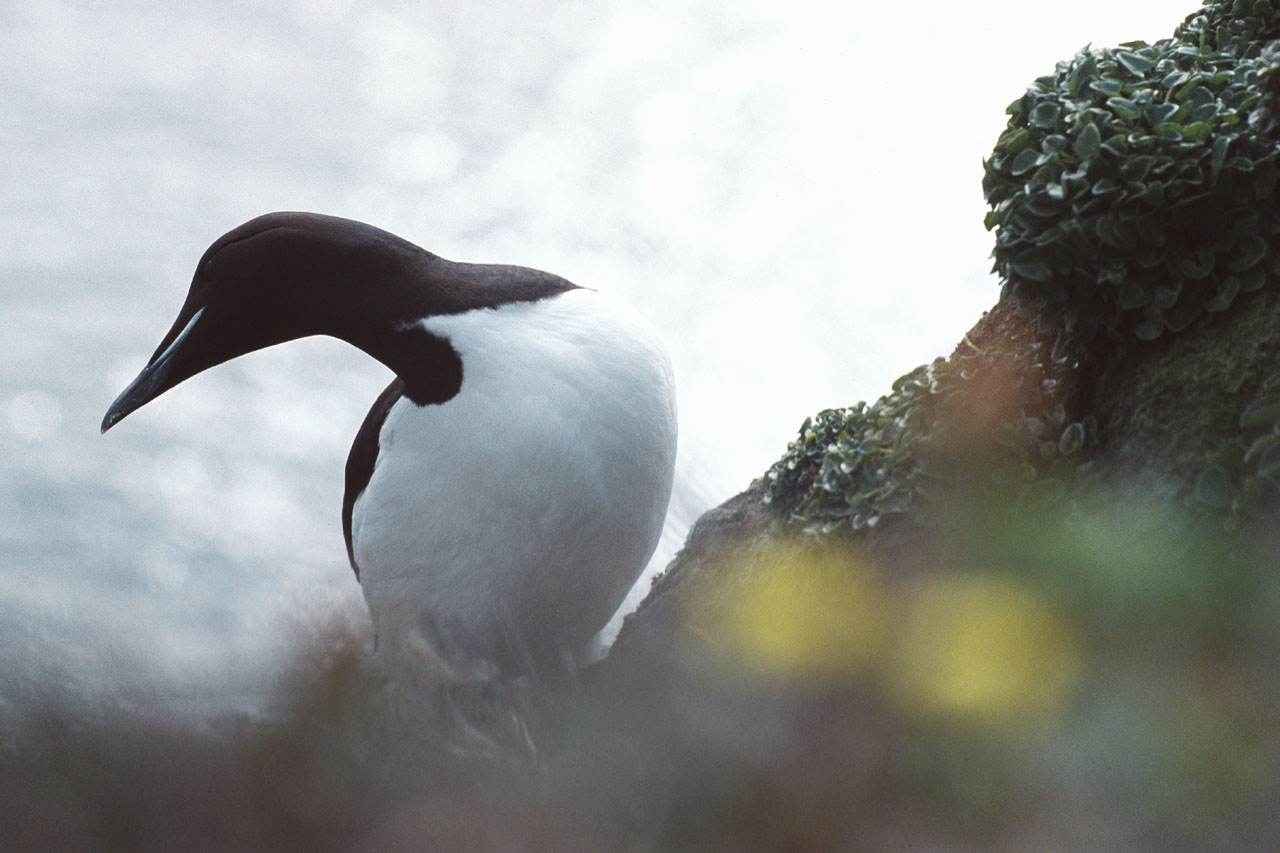
Thick-billed murre (Uria lomvia).

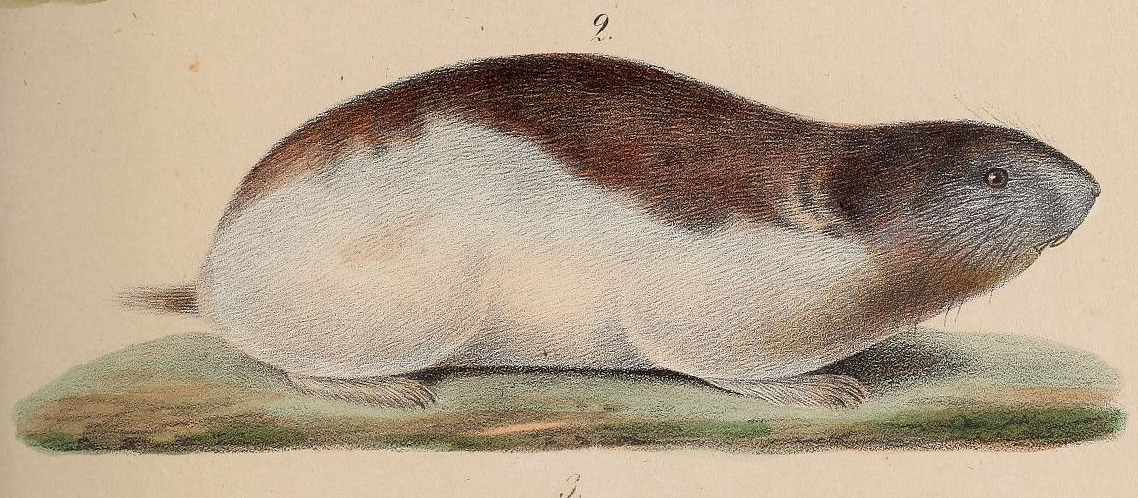
Collared lemming (Dicrostonyx torquatus), the most common mammal on Severnaya Zemlya.

== In culture ==
The discovery of Severnaya Zemlya is the subject of Veniamin Kaverin's novel The Two Captains as well as its stage adaptation, Nord-Ost.

The location of a secret Russian space weapons control facility is called Severnaya in the 1995 James Bond film GoldenEye. In several maps seen onscreen, however, this Severnaya is depicted as being in central Siberia. Severnaya is a level in GoldenEye 007, a 1997 video game based on the Bond film.

Severnaya is the site of the final act of the 2021 movie The Tomorrow War, where the protagonists locate a crashed spaceship holding the dormant White Spike Aliens.

== See also ==
- List of islands of Russia
- List of fjords of Russia
- List of glaciers of Russia
- List of research stations in the Arctic
- Great Northern Expedition
