= Shokalsky Strait =

Strait in Severnaya Zemlya, Russia

- Пролив Шокальского (Russian)
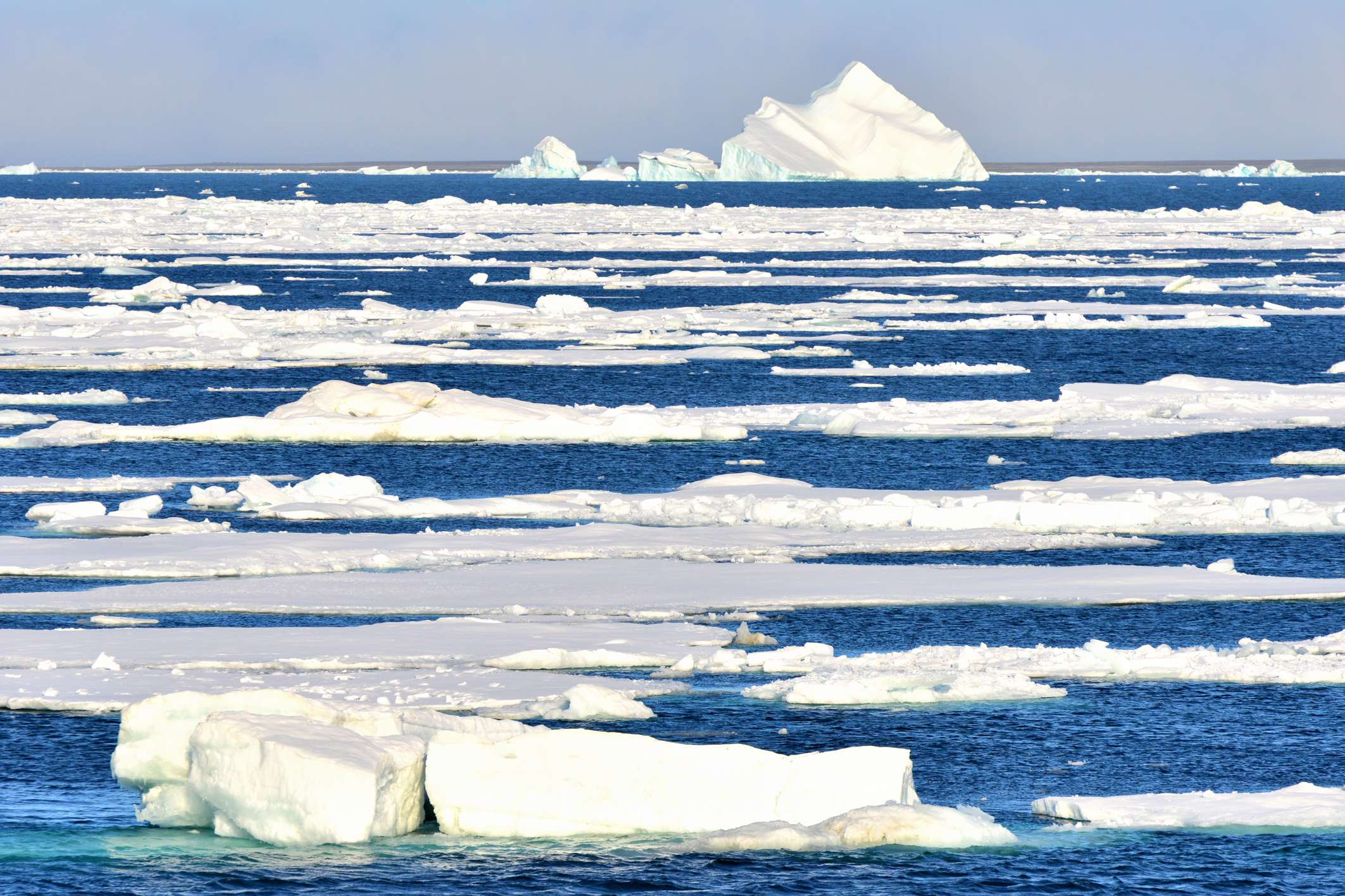
- Icebergs at the eastern end of the Shokalsky Strait off the northern end of Bolshevik Island

- Map showing the location of Shokalsky Strait

- Location within Krasnoyarsk Krai
- Location: Arctic, Krasnoyarsk Krai
- Coordinates: 78°48′N 100°04′E
- Ocean/sea sources: Kara Sea / Laptev Sea
- Basin countries: Russia
- Max. width: 50 km (31 mi)

Shokalsky Strait (Russian: Пролив Шокальского) is a strait in Severnaya Zemlya, Russia.

== Geography ==
The Shokalsky Strait is an up to a 50 km-wide strait that separates Bolshevik Island from October Revolution Island, connecting the Kara Sea in the west with the Laptev Sea in the east. It is named after Russian oceanographer Yuly Shokalsky

Some fjords of Severnaya Zemlya have their mouths in the strait, such as Marat Fjord in October Revolution Island's eastern shore, as well as Partizan Fjord, Spartak Fjord and Thaelmann Fjord in Bolshevik Island northwestern coast.

Cape Baranov and its adjacent Prima Polar Station are located in the northern part of Bolshevik Island facing the Shokalsky Strait.

The Krasnoflotskiye Islands are located at the western end of the strait.

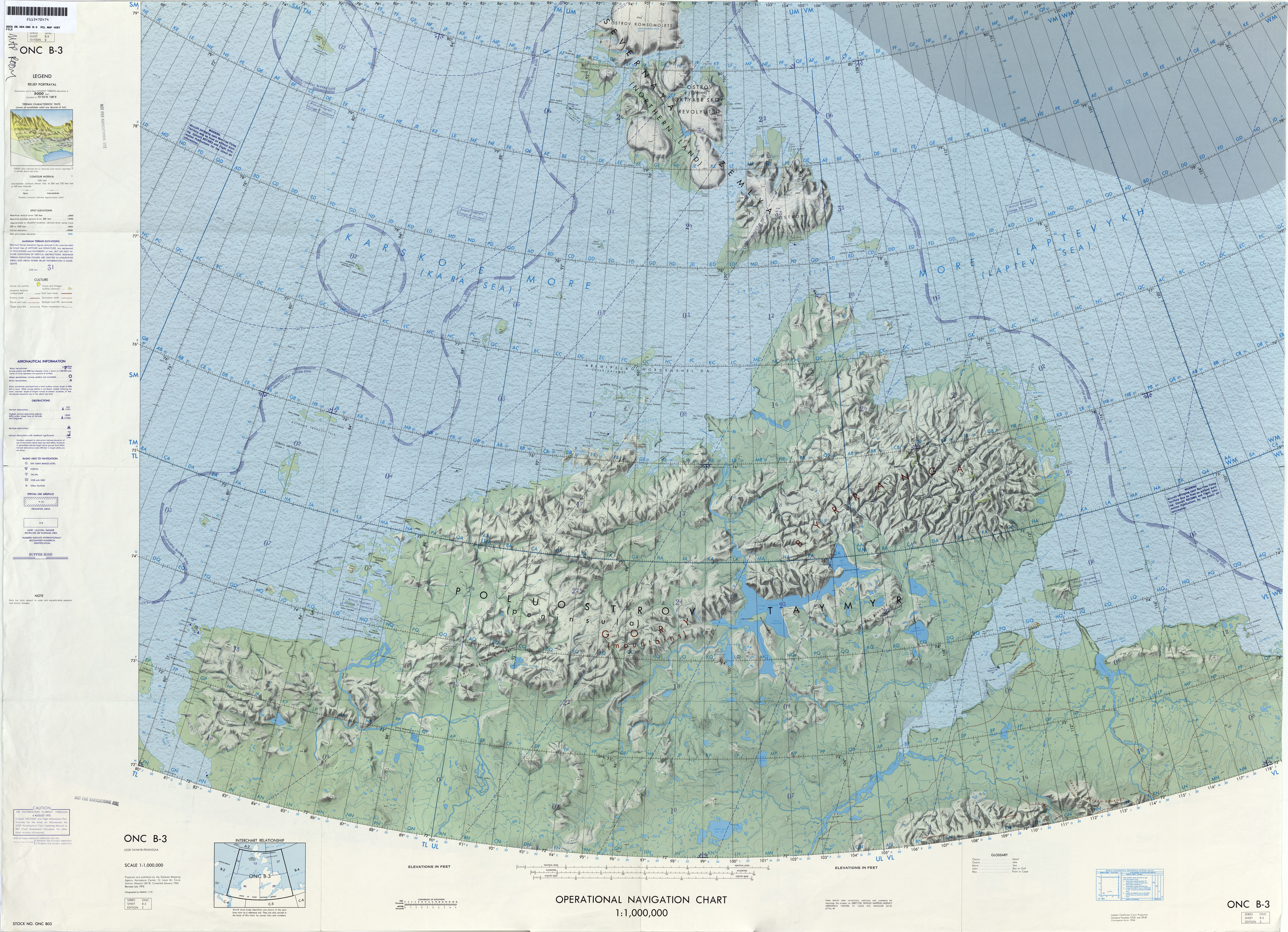
1975 map showing Severnaya Zemlya and the Taymyr Peninsula

== See also ==
- Mikoyan Bay
