= Arctic Ocean Hydrographic Expedition =

1910s Russian sea expedition

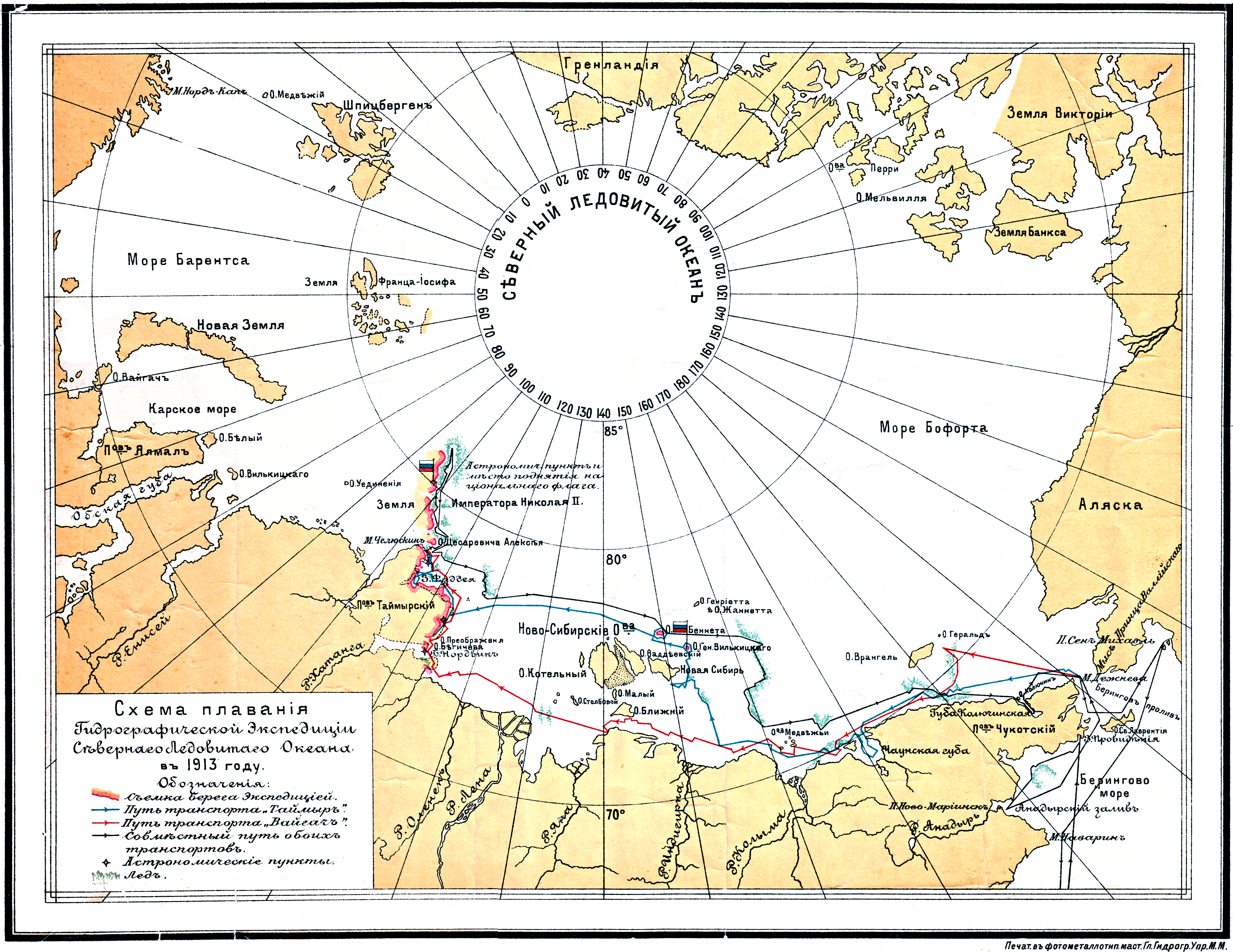
1913 Russian Hydrographic Service map showing the route of the expedition.

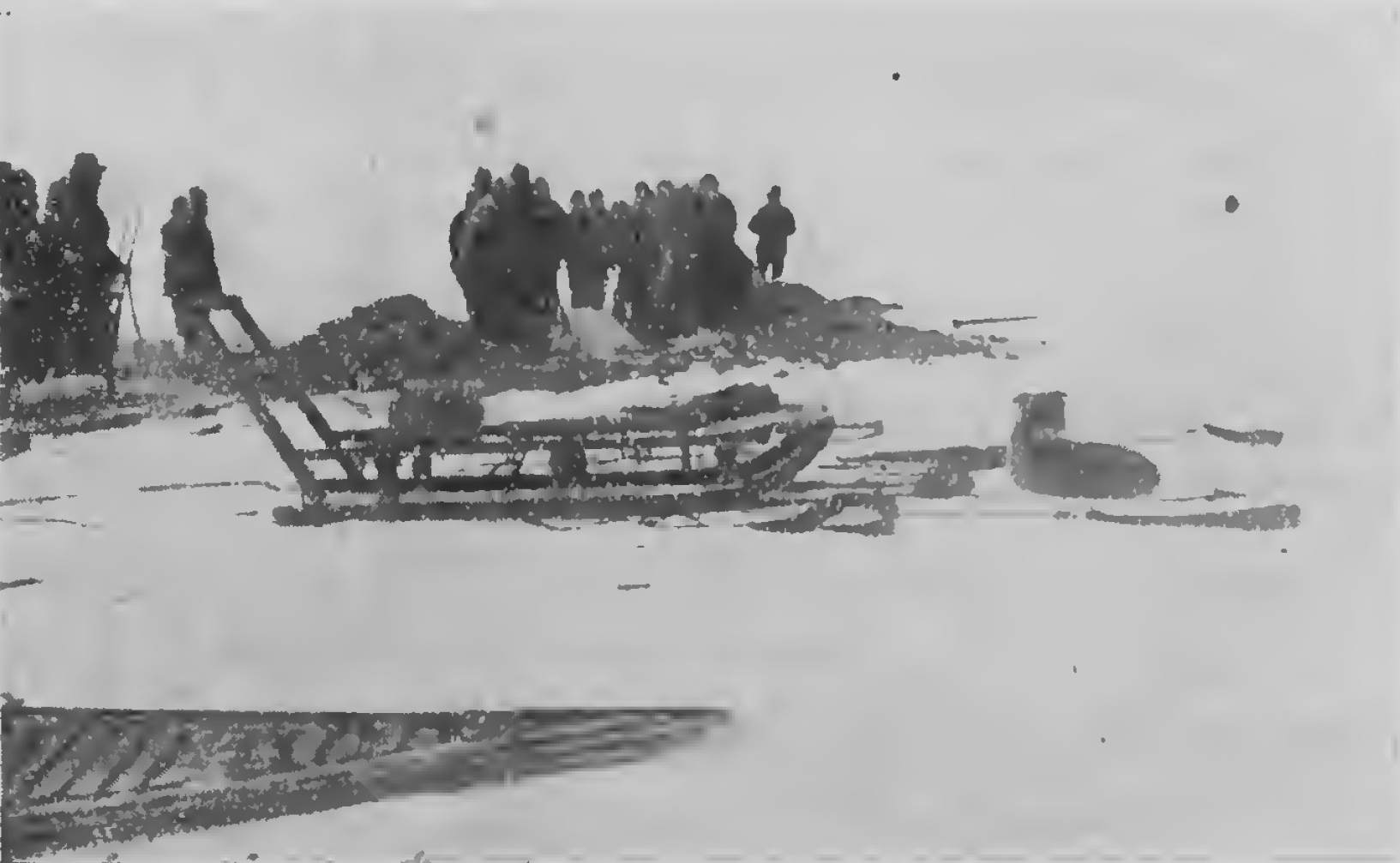
The burial of Lieutenant A. N. Zhokhov.

The Arctic Ocean Hydrographic Expedition (GESLO) (1910–1915) was a scientific expedition organized by Russia for the purpose of the development of the Northern Sea Route.

This expedition accomplished its goal of exploring the uncharted areas of the continental side of the Northern Sea Route in what was seen as the culmination of the Great Northern Expedition, an ambitious enterprise initially conceived by emperor Peter I the Great to map the whole of the northern coast of Russia to the east.

== Expedition ==
Two icebreaking steamers Vaygach and Taymyr were used for the venture. The plan of the expedition was developed with the active participation of Alexander Kolchak and Fyodor Matisen. The 32 man expedition was headed by Boris Vilkitsky and was staffed with military seamen and hydrographers, such as Konstantin Neupokoev. The biological and geological collections were performed by military doctors Leonid Starokadomsky on icebreaker Taymyr and E. E. Arnold on icebreaker Vaygach.

The Arctic Ocean Hydrographic Expedition moved along the northern waters of Siberia from East to West. This expedition completed the cartography and description of the Northern coast of Eastern Siberia and its many islands. It also gathered a large quantity of data on currents, ice conditions, climate, and magnetic phenomena.

In 1913 the hydrographic expedition of the Arctic Ocean discovered the large Emperor Nicholas II Land —now Severnaya Zemlya (Northern Land), the last significant geographical discovery on the globe. On 3 September 1913 (22 August 1913 in the Julian calendar used by Russia at the time), members of the expedition landed on what is now known as Cape Berg on present day October Revolution Island. They raised the Russian flag on the shore and named the new territory Emperor Nicholas II Land, (Russian: Zemlya Imperatora Nikolaya II), after Emperor Nicholas II of Russia, charting only parts of the Laptev Sea coast of what they believed to be a single island.

== See also ==
- Russian Hydrographic Service
- Russian polar expedition of 1900–1902
