= Georgy Ushakov =

Soviet Arctic explorer (1901–1963)

- Георгий Ушаков
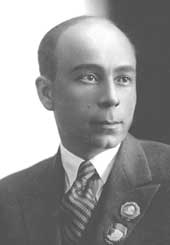
- Georgy Ushakov before World War II
- Born: 30 January 1901; Lazarevo, Russia
- Died: 3 December 1963 (aged 62); Moscow, Russian SFSR, Soviet Union
- Known for: Arctic explorer
- Awards: Order of Lenin; Order of the Red Banner of Labour; Order of the Red Star

Georgy Alexeyevich Ushakov (Russian: Гео́ргий Алексе́евич Ушако́в; 30 January [O.S. 17 January] 1901 – 3 December 1963) was a Soviet explorer of the Arctic.

Ushakov was one of the leaders of the 1930–1932 expedition that surveyed Severnaya Zemlya and established that it was an archipelago. He received the degree of Doctor of Geographic Sciences in 1950.

== Career ==
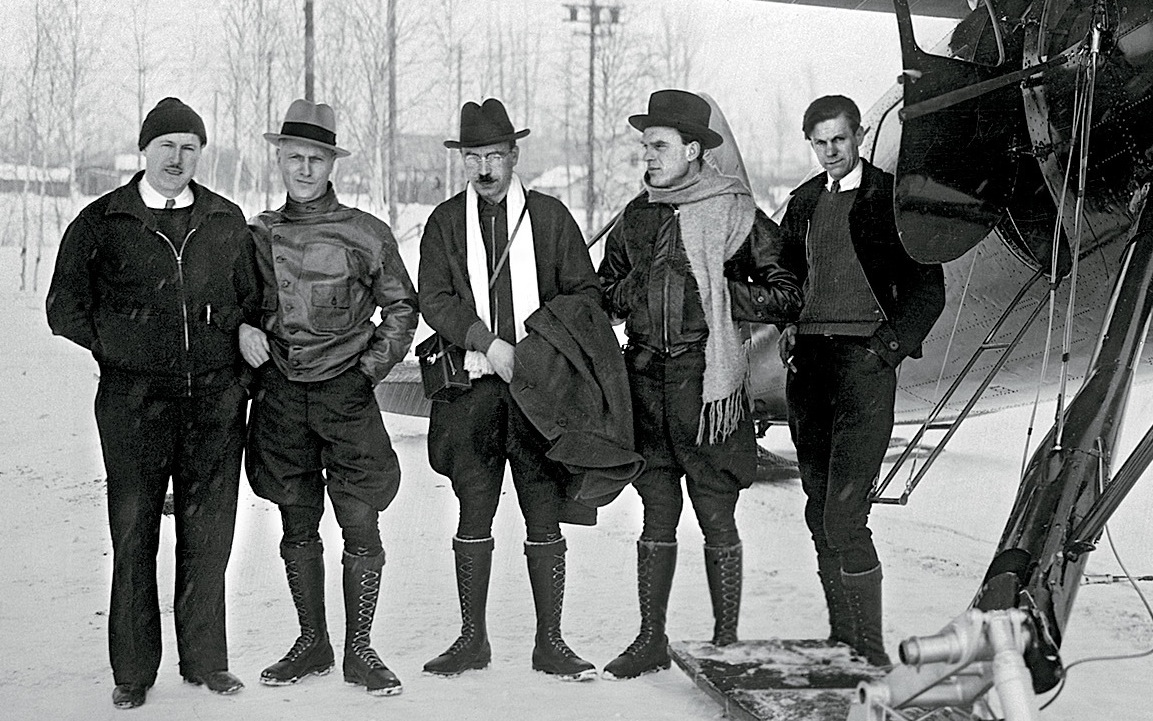
G. Ushakov (centre) in Alaska during the venture to rescue the SS Chelyuskin crew

In 1926, Ushakov founded the first Soviet settlement on Wrangel Island, now known as Ushakovskoye, and served as its head for three years. In 1930–1932, Ushakov headed the Severnaya Zemlya expedition and established a polar station called Остров Домашний (Domashniy Island).

In 1929 and 1930 icebreaker Sedov carried groups of scientists to Franz Josef Land and later to former Emperor Nicholas II Land, the last major piece of unsurveyed territory in the Soviet Arctic. In 1926 the Presidium of the Central Executive Committee of the USSR renamed the still incompletely explored territory Severnaya Zemlya (Northern Land). Ushakov, geologist Nikolay Urvantsev, surveyor Sergei Zhuravlev, and radio operator Vasily Khodov surveyed and mapped Severnaya Zemlya during a 1930–1932 expedition. Geographic features of the territory were named after communist organizations, events, and personalities. About the bleakness of Severnaya Zemlya Ushakov wrote:

I have seen God-forsaken Chukotka Peninsula, blizzard-ridden Wrangel Island, twice visited fog enshrouded Novaya Zemlya, and I have seen Franz Josef Land with its enamel sky and proud cliffs garbed in blue, hardened glacial streams, but nowhere did I witness such grimness or such depressing, lifeless relief...

In 1935, Ushakov led the first Soviet high-latitude expedition on an icebreaker Sadko. The cruises of the Sadko went farther north than most; in 1935 and 1936 the last unexplored areas in the northern Kara Sea were examined and the little Ushakov Island was discovered. In 1937 the ship was caught in the ice with two others and forced to winter in the Laptev Sea, adding valuable winter observations to the usual summer ones.

From 1932 to 1936, Ushakov worked at the Chief Directorate of the Northern Sea Route (Главное Управление Северного Морского Пути). He then worked at the Chief Directorate of the Hydrometeorological Service of the USSR from 1936 to 1940 and at the Soviet Academy of Sciences from 1940 to 1958.

Ushakov died in Moscow and was buried on Domashniy Island in Severnaya Zemlya.

== Honours ==
Mountains in Antarctica, a spit and a cape on Wrangel Island, and a river on October Revolution Island are named after Ushakov. Ushakov Island in the Russian Arctic also bears his name.

=== Medals ===
Ushakov received the Order of Lenin, the Order of the Red Banner of Labour, the Order of the Red Star, and other medals.
