= 78th meridian west =

Line of longitude

78th meridian west

The meridian 78° west of Greenwich is a line of longitude that extends from the North Pole across the Arctic Ocean, North America, the Atlantic Ocean, the Caribbean Sea, Panama, South America, the Pacific Ocean, the Southern Ocean, and Antarctica to the South Pole.

The 78th meridian west forms a great circle with the 102nd meridian east.

== From Pole to Pole ==
Starting at the North Pole and heading south to the South Pole, the 78th meridian west passes through:

Co-ordinates	Country, territory or sea	Notes
90°0′N 78°0′W	Arctic Ocean	
82°54′N 78°0′W	Canada	Nunavut — Ellesmere Island
77°28′N 78°0′W	Baffin Bay	
76°59′N 78°0′W	Canada	Nunavut — Ellesmere Island
76°37′N 78°0′W	Baffin Bay	
73°38′N 78°0′W	Canada	Nunavut — Bylot Island
72°53′N 78°0′W	Eclipse Sound	
72°41′N 78°0′W	Canada	Nunavut — Baffin Island
70°14′N 78°0′W	Foxe Basin	
69°43′N 78°0′W	Canada	Nunavut — Koch Island
69°37′N 78°0′W	Foxe Basin	
65°0′N 78°0′W	Canada	Nunavut — Foxe Peninsula, Baffin Island
64°25′N 78°0′W	Foxe Channel	
64°0′N 78°0′W	Canada	Nunavut — unnamed island just west of Mill Island
63°57′N 78°0′W	Foxe Channel	
63°28′N 78°0′W	Canada	Nunavut — Nottingham Island
63°7′N 78°0′W	Foxe Channel	
62°35′N 78°0′W	Canada	Nunavut — Digges Islands
62°33′N 78°0′W	Hudson Bay	
62°23′N 78°0′W	Canada	Quebec — Ungava Peninsula
61°42′N 78°0′W	Hudson Bay	
60°59′N 78°0′W	Canada	Quebec — Ungava Peninsula
60°46′N 78°0′W	Hudson Bay	
59°16′N 78°0′W	Canada	Quebec — Ungava Peninsula; Nunavut — from 58°21′N 78°0′W, Frazier Island
58°20′N 78°0′W	Hudson Bay	Passing through the Salikuit Islands (at 56°18′N 78°0′W)
55°11′N 78°0′W	Canada	Quebec; Ontario — from 46°14′N 78°0′W
43°58′N 78°0′W	Lake Ontario	
43°22′N 78°0′W	United States	New York; Pennsylvania — from 42°0′N 78°0′W; Maryland — from 39°43′N 78°0′W; West Virginia — from 39°36′N 78°0′W; Virginia — from 39°14′N 78°0′W; North Carolina — from 36°33′N 78°0′W (passing just west of Wilmington at 34°14'N)
33°51′N 78°0′W	Atlantic Ocean	
26°43′N 78°0′W	Bahamas	Island of Grand Bahama
26°39′N 78°0′W	Atlantic Ocean	Passing just west of the Berry Islands, Bahamas (at 25°49′N 77°55′W)
25°9′N 78°0′W	Bahamas	Island of Andros
24°13′N 78°0′W	Atlantic Ocean	
22°18′N 78°0′W	Cuba	Cayo Romano and the mainland
20°42′N 78°0′W	Caribbean Sea	
18°27′N 78°0′W	Jamaica	
18°7′N 78°0′W	Caribbean Sea	
9°11′N 78°0′W	Panama	
7°19′N 78°0′W	Pacific Ocean	Passing just east of Gorgona island, Colombia (at 3°0′N 78°10′W)
2°39′N 78°0′W	Colombia	
0°50′N 78°0′W	Ecuador	
3°8′S 78°0′W	Peru	
10°26′S 78°0′W	Pacific Ocean	
60°0′S 78°0′W	Southern Ocean	
72°31′S 78°0′W	Antarctica	Territory claimed by Chile (Antártica Chilena Province) and by the United Kingdom (British Antarctic Territory)

== See also ==
- 77th meridian west
- 79th meridian west
