= 102nd meridian =

102nd meridian may refer to:

- 102nd meridian east, a line of longitude east of the Greenwich Meridian
- 102nd meridian west, a line of longitude west of the Greenwich Meridian

102nd meridian west	102nd meridian east
