= 103rd meridian =

103rd meridian may refer to:

- 103rd meridian east, a line of longitude east of the Greenwich Meridian
- 103rd meridian west, a line of longitude west of the Greenwich Meridian

103rd meridian west	103rd meridian east
