= Akhmatov Fjord =

Fjord in Severnaya Zemlya, Russia

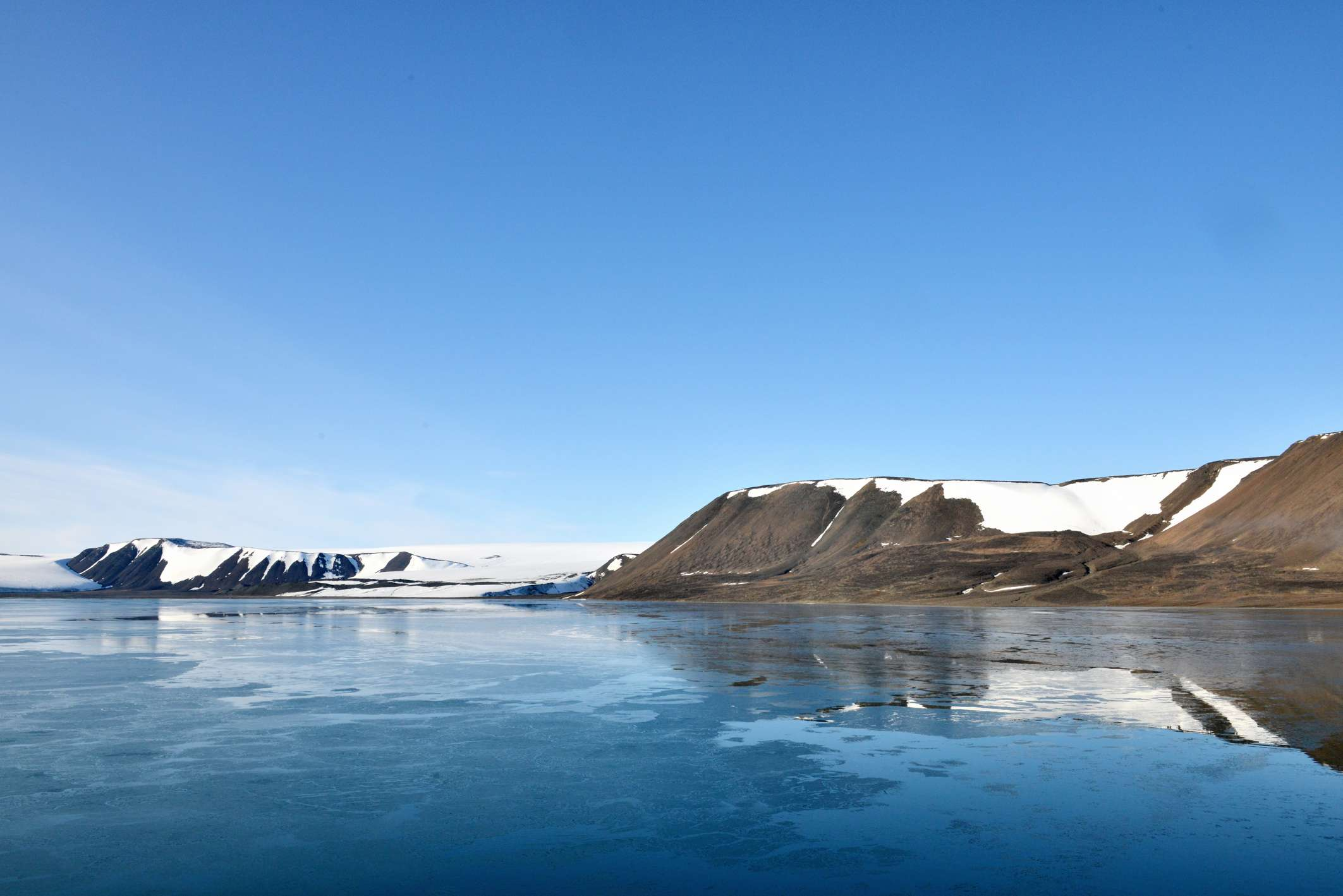
- View of the shore of the fjord

- Location in Krasnoyarsk Krai

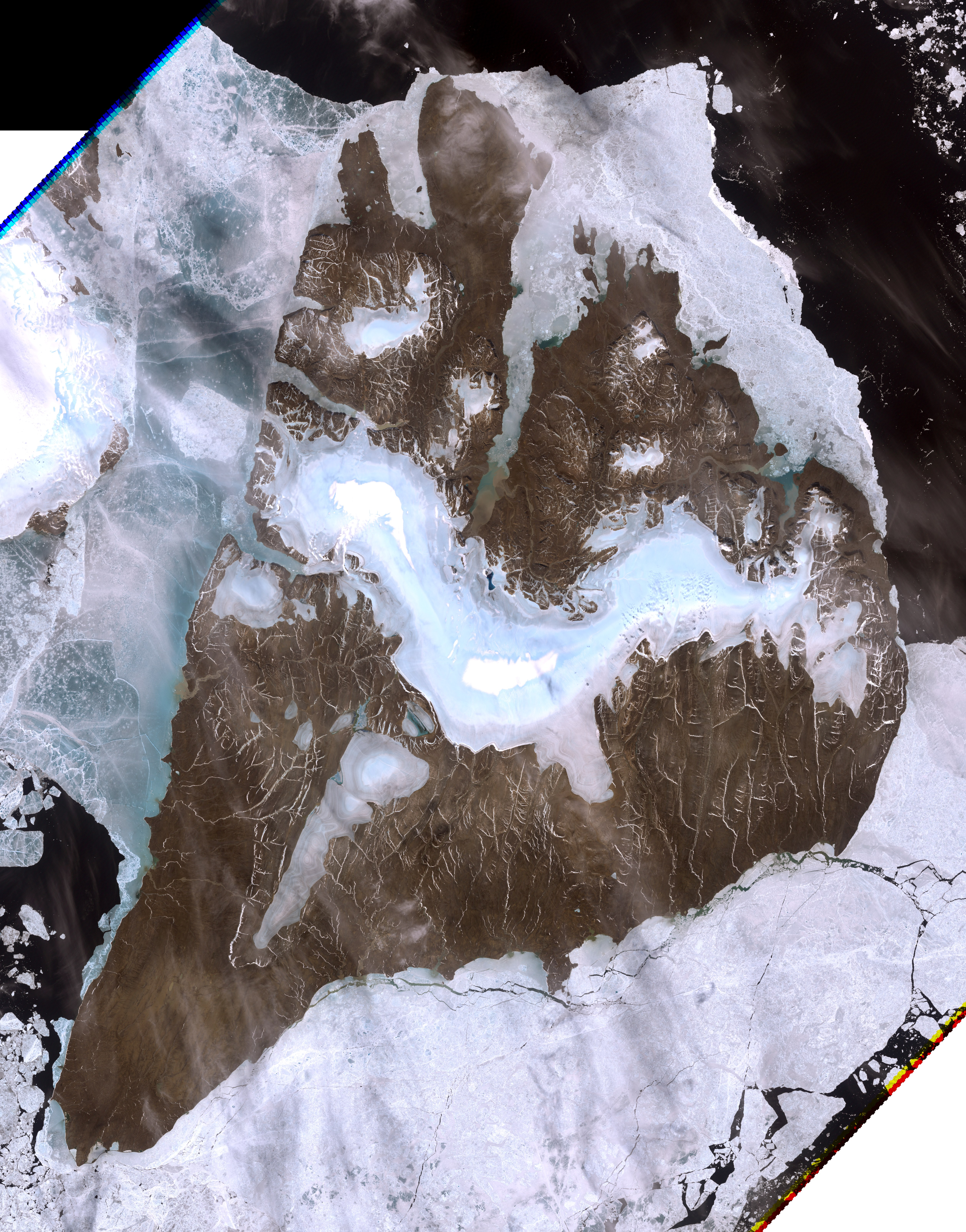
- Landsat 7 image of Bolshevik Island
- Location: Severnaya Zemlya, Krasnoyarsk Krai
- Coordinates: 79°7′N 103°3′E
- Ocean/sea sources: Laptev Sea
- Basin countries: Russia
- Max. length: 56 km (35 mi)
- Max. width: 17 km (11 mi)
- Islands: Lishny Island, Yuzhny Island

Akhmatov Fjord, also known as Akhmatov Bay (Russian: Залив Ахматова, Zaliv Akhmatova), is a fjord in Severnaya Zemlya, Krasnoyarsk Krai, Russia. This fjord is clogged by ice most of the year.

== History ==
The fjord was named in 1913 after the Russian hydrographer who surveyed it in the course of the Arctic Ocean Hydrographic Expedition led by Boris Vilkitsky on behalf of the Russian Hydrographic Service.

== Geography ==
Akhmatov Fjord is a fjord with a wide entrance in the northeastern area of Bolshevik Island, the southernmost island of Severnaya Zemlya. It is located southeast of Cape Unslicht on the Laptev Sea shore of the island, east of Mikoyan Bay.

The fjord extends in a roughly northeast/southwest direction for about 56 km. The basin inside the fjord has smooth mountains on both sides. Near the mouth Akhmatov Fjord is about 17 km wide, and the inner fjord becomes narrower, averaging 5 km in width. Lishny Island and Yuzhny Island —among other smaller islands, lie on the eastern side of the area near the mouth of the fjord that forms a wide bay.

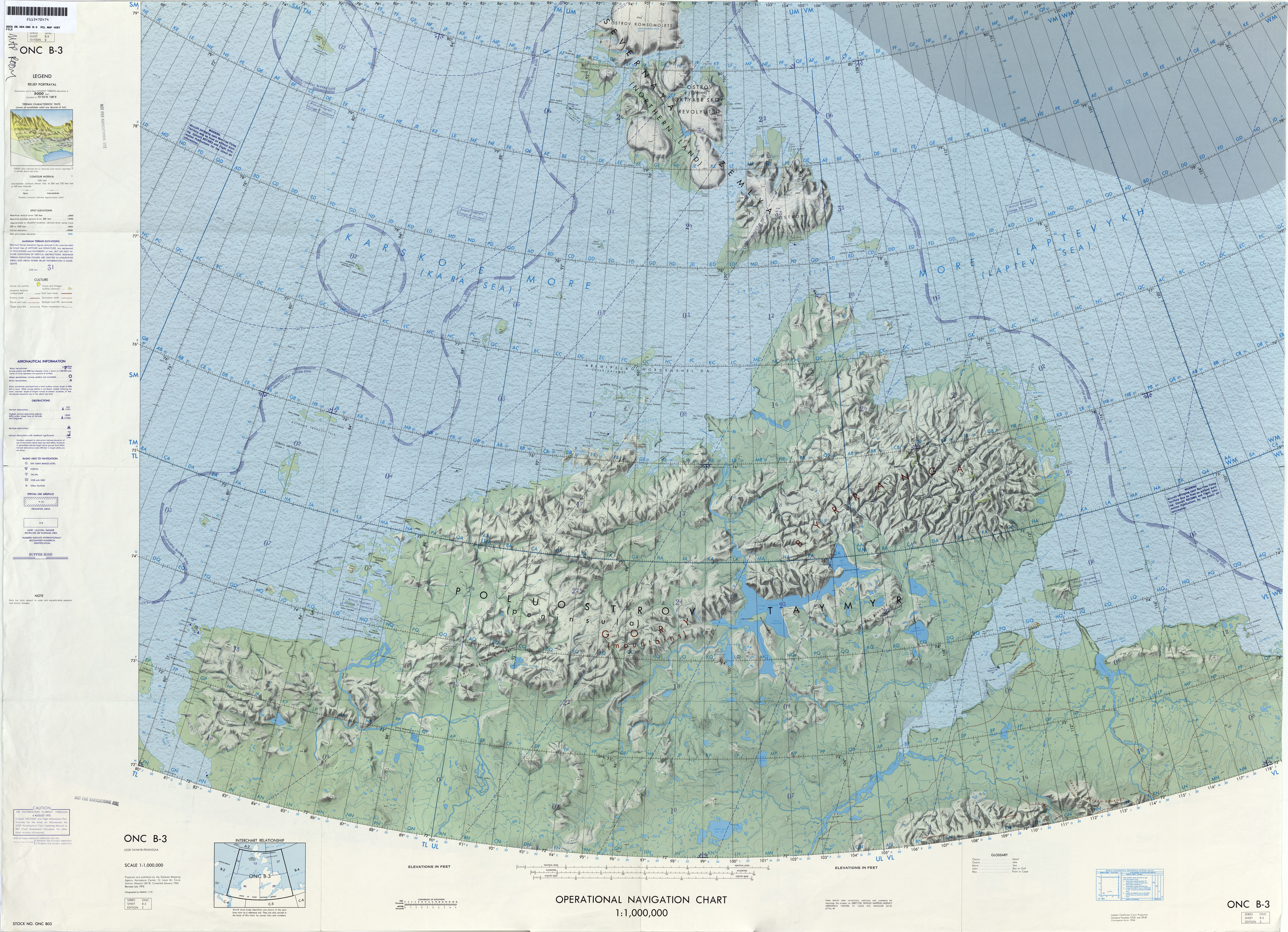
1975 map showing Severnaya Zemlya and the Taymyr Peninsula

== See also ==
- List of fjords of Russia
