= Koch's Island =

Koch's Island can refer to:

- Koch Island
- Koch snowflake
