= 78th meridian =

78th meridian may refer to:

- 78th meridian east, a line of longitude east of the Greenwich Meridian
- 78th meridian west, a line of longitude west of the Greenwich Meridian

78th meridian west	78th meridian east
