= 77th meridian west =

Line of longitude

77th meridian west

The meridian 77° west of Greenwich is a line of longitude that extends from the North Pole across the Arctic Ocean, North America, the Atlantic Ocean, the Caribbean Sea, South America, the Pacific Ocean, the Southern Ocean, and Antarctica to the South Pole.

The 77th meridian west forms a great circle with the 103rd meridian east.

== From Pole to Pole ==
Starting at the North Pole and heading south to the South Pole, the 77th meridian west passes through:

Co-ordinates	Country, territory or sea	Notes
90°0′N 77°0′W	Arctic Ocean	
83°1′N 77°0′W	Canada	Nunavut — Ellesmere Island
77°54′N 77°0′W	Baffin Bay	
73°21′N 77°0′W	Canada	Nunavut — Bylot Island and Baffin Island
69°36′N 77°0′W	Foxe Basin	
69°25′N 77°0′W	Canada	Nunavut — Bray Island
69°9′N 77°0′W	Foxe Basin	
68°2′N 77°0′W	Canada	Nunavut — Prince Charles Island
67°15′N 77°0′W	Foxe Basin	
65°24′N 77°0′W	Canada	Nunavut — Foxe Peninsula, Baffin Island
64°15′N 77°0′W	Hudson Strait	
63°40′N 77°0′W	Canada	Nunavut — Salisbury Island
63°25′N 77°0′W	Hudson Strait	
62°32′N 77°0′W	Canada	Quebec
57°49′N 77°0′W	Hudson Bay	
55°48′N 77°0′W	Canada	Quebec; Ontario — from 45°48′N 77°0′W
43°53′N 77°0′W	Lake Ontario	
43°16′N 77°0′W	United States	New York; Pennsylvania — from 42°0′N 77°0′W; Maryland — from 39°42′N 77°0′W; District of Columbia — from 38°58′N 77°0′W; Maryland — from 38°49′N 77°0′W; Virginia — from 38°20′N 77°0′W; North Carolina — from 36°32′N 77°0′W
34°40′N 77°0′W	Atlantic Ocean	
26°35′N 77°0′W	Bahamas	Man-O-War Cay and Great Abaco Island
26°19′N 77°0′W	Atlantic Ocean	Passing just west of the island of Eleuthera, Bahamas (at 25°24′N 76°47′W); Passing just east of the island of New Providence, Bahamas (at 25°2′N 77°15′W)
21°31′N 77°0′W	Cuba	
19°53′N 77°0′W	Caribbean Sea	
18°24′N 77°0′W	Jamaica	
17°51′N 77°0′W	Caribbean Sea	
8°15′N 77°0′W	Colombia	
7°56′01.2″N 77°09′24″W	Panama	
0°18′N 77°0′W	Ecuador	
2°43′S 77°0′W	Peru	Passing just east of Lima (at 12°2′S 77°2′W)
12°14′S 77°0′W	Pacific Ocean	
60°0′S 77°0′W	Southern Ocean	
72°41′S 77°0′W	Antarctica	Territory claimed by Chile (Antártica Chilena Province) and by the United Kingdom (British Antarctic Territory)

== See also ==
- 76th meridian west
- 78th meridian west
