= Mill Island (disambiguation) =

Mill Island may refer to

- Mill Island, Antarctica
- Mill Basin, Brooklyn, United States, formerly known as "Mill Island"
- Mill Island (Nunavut), Canada
- Mill Island (Moorefield, West Virginia), United States
- Ray Mill Island, England
- Temple Mill Island, England
- Mill Island, Bydgoszcz, Poland
