= Solnechny Bay =

- Бухта Солнечная (Russian)
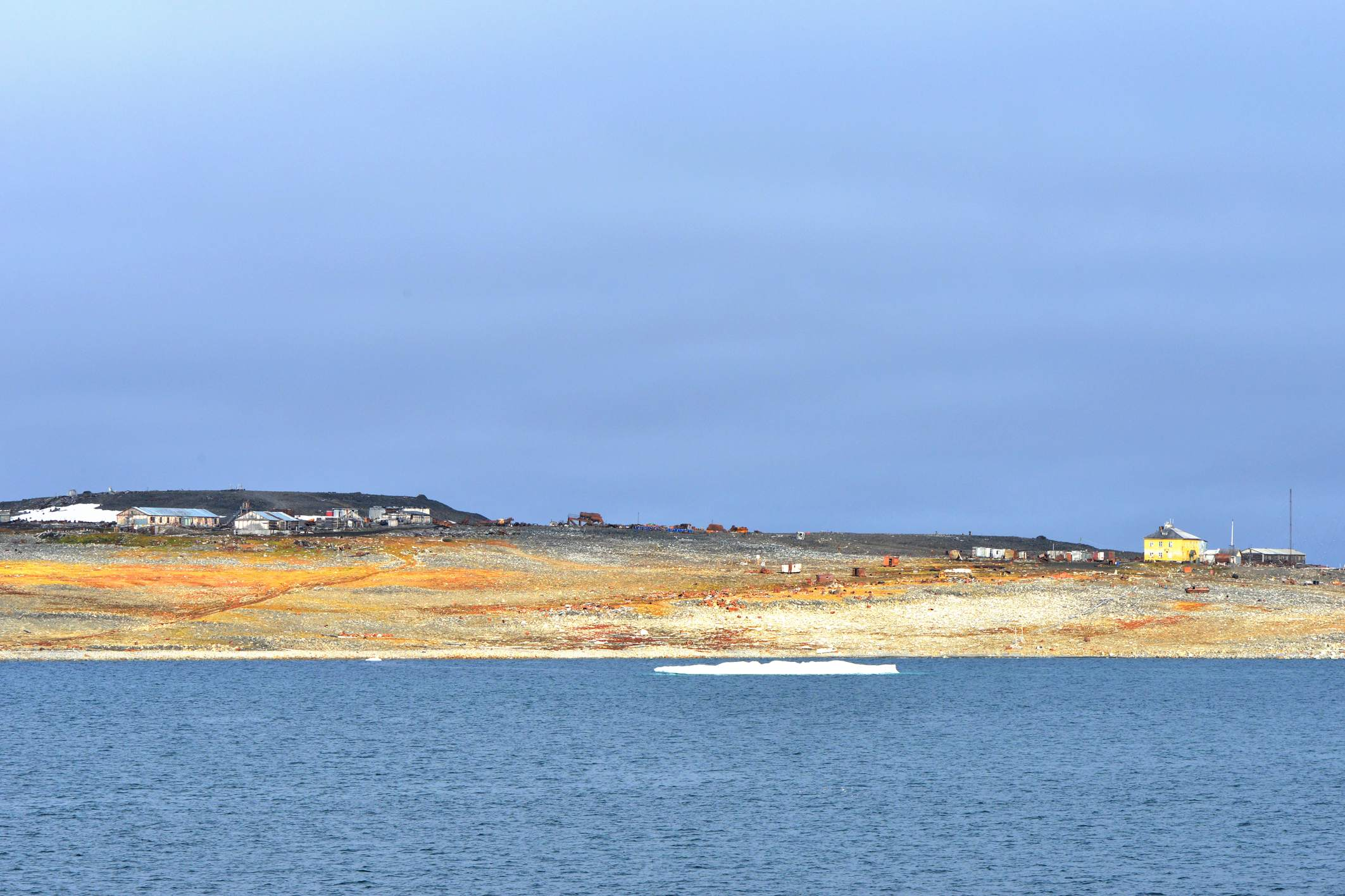
- View of the shore of Solnechny Bay with the abandoned polar station buildings

- Location in Krasnoyarsk Krai
- Location: Severnaya Zemlya, Krasnoyarsk Krai
- Coordinates: 78°11′N 103°7′E
- Ocean/sea sources: Vilkitsky Strait
- Basin countries: Russia
- Max. length: 3 km (1.9 mi)
- Max. width: 6.5 km (4.0 mi)

Solnechny Bay (Russian: Бухта Солнечная, Bukhta Solnechnaya), is a bay in Severnaya Zemlya, Krasnoyarsk Krai, Russia.

== History ==
There is an abandoned polar station on the eastern side of Solnechny Bay, near Cape Antsev, as well as an astronomic observatory 4 km to the west.

== Geography ==
Solnechny Bay is a bay in the southern shore of Bolshevik Island, the southernmost island of Severnaya Zemlya. It is located on the Vilkitsky Strait coast of the island. The headland on the western side of the mouth of the bay is Cape Maysky and the eastern Cape Antsev.

The bay opens towards the south and is about 7 km wide. The Vkhodnoy Islands, a group of two islets facing the bay lie 4 km off the shore.

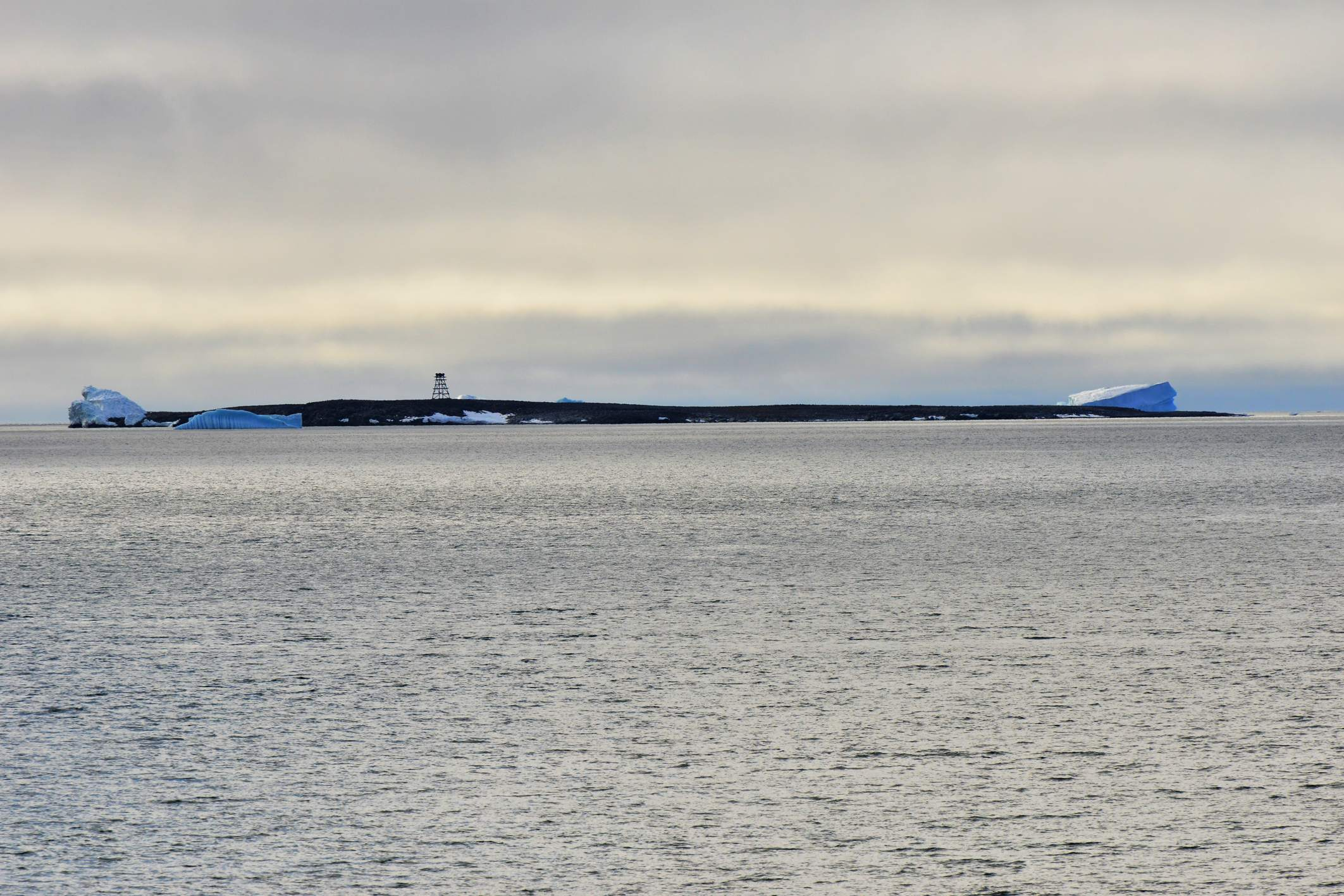
View of Cape Antsev, the easternmost point of the bay.

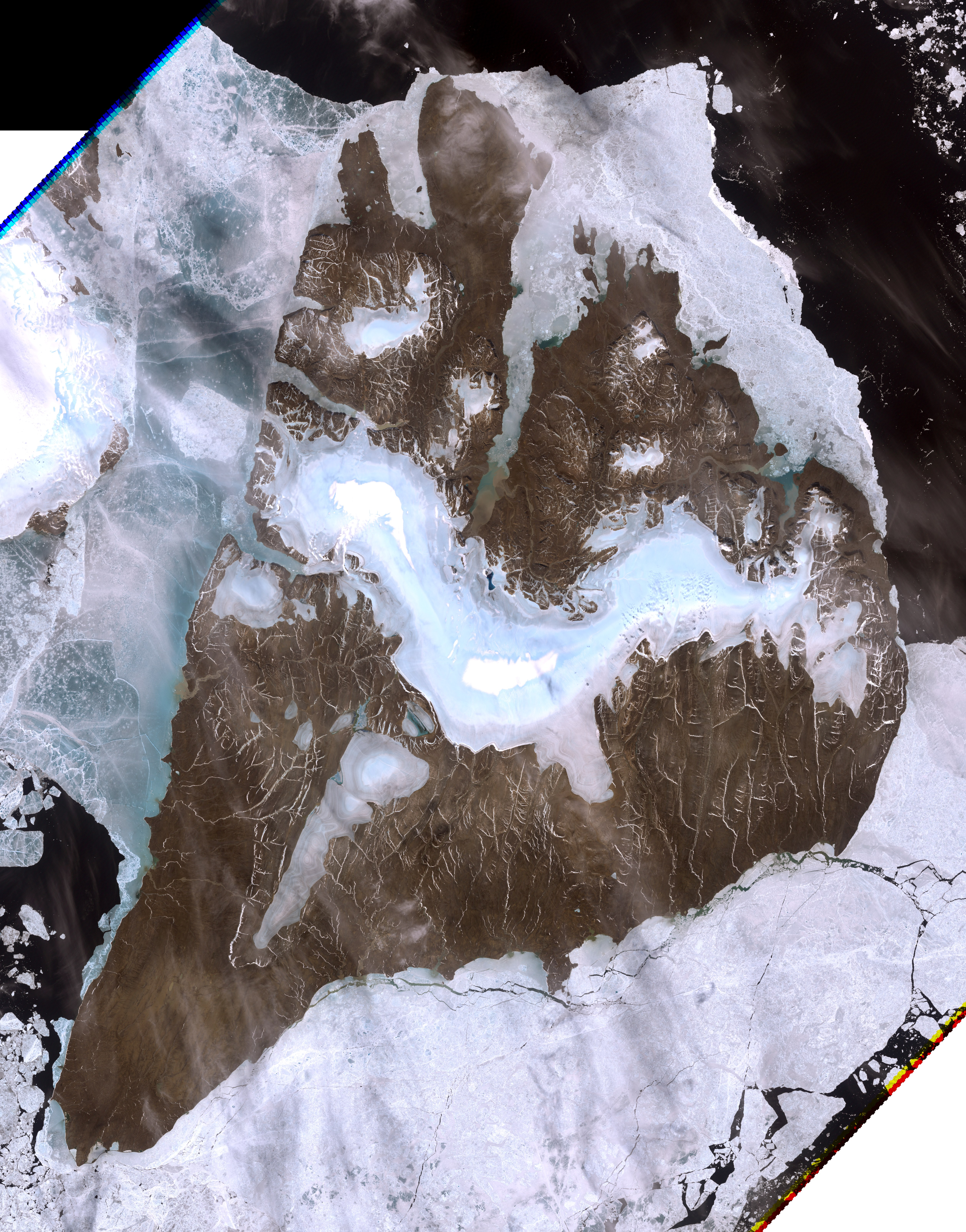
NASA image of Bolshevik Island

== See also ==
- List of research stations in the Arctic
