= 102nd meridian east =

Line of longitude

102nd meridian east

The meridian 102° east of Greenwich is a line of longitude that extends from the North Pole across the Arctic Ocean, Asia, the Indian Ocean, the Southern Ocean, and Antarctica to the South Pole.

The 102nd meridian east forms a great circle with the 78th meridian west.

== From Pole to Pole ==
Starting at the North Pole and heading south to the South Pole, the 102nd meridian east passes through:

| Co-ordinates | Country, territory or sea | Notes |
|---|---|---|
| 90°0′N 102°0′E | Arctic Ocean | |
| 80°23′N 102°0′E | Laptev Sea | |
| 79°15′N 102°0′E | Russia | Krasnoyarsk Krai — Bolshevik Island, Severnaya Zemlya |
| 78°11′N 102°0′E | Kara Sea | |
| 77°18′N 102°0′E | Russia | Krasnoyarsk Krai; Irkutsk Oblast — from 58°29′N 102°0′E; Republic of Buryatia — from 52°13′N 102°0′E |
| 51°23′N 102°0′E | Mongolia | |
| 42°17′N 102°0′E | People's Republic of China | Inner Mongolia; Gansu — for about 14 km from 39°7′N 102°0′E; Inner Mongolia — for about 23 km from 39°0′N 102°0′E; Gansu — from 38°47′N 102°0′E; Qinghai — from 37°42′N 102°0′E; Gansu — from 34°55′N 102°0′E; Qinghai — from 34°30′N 102°0′E; Gansu — from 34°5′N 102°0′E; Sichuan — from 33°10′N 102°0′E; Yunnan — from 26°5′N 102°0′E |
| 22°26′N 102°0′E | Laos | |
| 18°8′N 102°0′E | Thailand | |
| 12°32′N 102°0′E | Gulf of Thailand | |
| 6°18′N 102°0′E | Thailand | |
| 6°2′N 102°0′E | Malaysia | Passing just east of border town Rantau Panjang at 6°N; Passing just east of Senawang near Seremban at 2°42'N |
| 2°22′N 102°0′E | Strait of Malacca | |
| 1°37′N 102°0′E | Indonesia | Islands of Bengkalis and Sumatra |
| 3°31′S 102°0′E | Indian Ocean | Passing just west of Enggano Island, Indonesia (at 5°21′S 102°5′E) |
| 60°0′S 102°0′E | Southern Ocean | |
| 65°44′S 102°0′E | Antarctica | Australian Antarctic Territory, claimed by Australia |

| Next westward: 101st meridian east | 102nd meridian east forms a great circle with 78th meridian west | Next eastward: 103rd meridian east |
