= 103rd meridian east =

Line of longitude

103rd meridian east (interactive map)

The meridian 103° east of Greenwich is a line of longitude that extends from the North Pole across the Arctic Ocean, Asia, the Indian Ocean, the Southern Ocean, and Antarctica to the South Pole.

The 103rd meridian east forms a great circle with the 77th meridian west.

== From Pole to Pole ==
Starting at the North Pole and heading south to the South Pole, the 103rd meridian east passes through:

Co-ordinates	Country, territory or sea	Notes
90°0′N 103°0′E	Arctic Ocean	
80°18′N 103°0′E	Laptev Sea	
79°19′N 103°0′E	Russia	Krasnoyarsk Krai — Bolshevik Island, Severnaya Zemlya
78°11′N 103°0′E	Kara Sea	
77°33′N 103°0′E	Russia	Krasnoyarsk Krai; Irkutsk Oblast — from 59°18′N 103°0′E; Republic of Buryatia — from 51°54′N 103°0′E
50°18′N 103°0′E	Mongolia	
42°1′N 103°0′E	China	Inner Mongolia; Gansu — from 39°6′N 103°0′E; Qinghai — for about 7 km from 36°16′N 103°0′E; Gansu — from 36°12′N 103°0′E; Sichuan — from 34°14′N 103°0′E; Yunnan — from 27°22′N 103°0′E; Sichuan — from 26°44′N 103°0′E; Yunnan — from 26°29′N 103°0′E
22°28′N 103°0′E	Vietnam	
21°4′N 103°0′E	Laos	
17°59′N 103°0′E	Thailand	
14°13′N 103°0′E	Cambodia	Mainland and island of Koh Kong
11°15′N 103°0′E	Gulf of Thailand	
6°58′N 103°0′E	South China Sea	
5°48′N 103°0′E	Malaysia	Redang Island
5°45′N 103°0′E	Gulf of Thailand	
5°30′N 103°0′E	Malaysia	Passing just east of Batu Pahat, Johor at 1°51'N
1°45′N 103°0′E	Strait of Malacca	
1°4′N 103°0′E	Indonesia	Islands of Rangsang, Tebing Tinggi and Sumatra
4°31′S 103°0′E	Indian Ocean	
60°0′S 103°0′E	Southern Ocean	
65°9′S 103°0′E	Antarctica	Australian Antarctic Territory, claimed by Australia

Next westward: 102nd meridian east	103rd meridian east forms a great circle with 77th meridian west	Next eastward: 104th meridian east
