= Cape Baranov =

Headland in Severnaya Zemlya, Russia

Cape Baranov Мыс Баранова
- Cape
- Location of Cape Baranov in Krasnoyarsk Krai
- Coordinates: 79°21′4″N 101°44′0″E
- Location: Bolshevik Island, Severnaya Zemlya, Russia
- Offshore water bodies: Shokalsky Strait

Area
  - Total: Russian Far North

Cape Baranov (Russian: Мыс Баранова; Mys Baranova) is a headland in Severnaya Zemlya, Russia.

== History ==
The Laptev Sea shore of present-day Severnaya Zemlya was discovered by Boris Vilkitsky in 1913 during the Arctic Ocean Hydrographic Expedition on behalf of the Russian Hydrographic Service, but he was unaware that there was a strait west of the cape between what is now Bolshevik Island and the islands further north, for the straits are frozen most of the year, forming a compact whole.

This cape was named during the 1930–1932 expedition to the archipelago led by Georgy Ushakov and Nikolay Urvantsev after Soviet scientist Fedor Baranov (1886–1965).

Located near Cape Baranov, roughly 15 km (9.3 mi) to the SSE of the cape, the Prima Polar Station of the Arctic and Antarctic Research Institute closed down in 1996 and reopened in June 2013 as a private venture. This is currently the only Arctic research facility operating in Severnaya Zemlya.

== Geography ==
Cape Baranov is located in the northern part of Bolshevik Island facing the Shokalsky Strait. This headland stretches out northwards in an unglaciated lowland area west of the mouth of Mikoyan Bay.

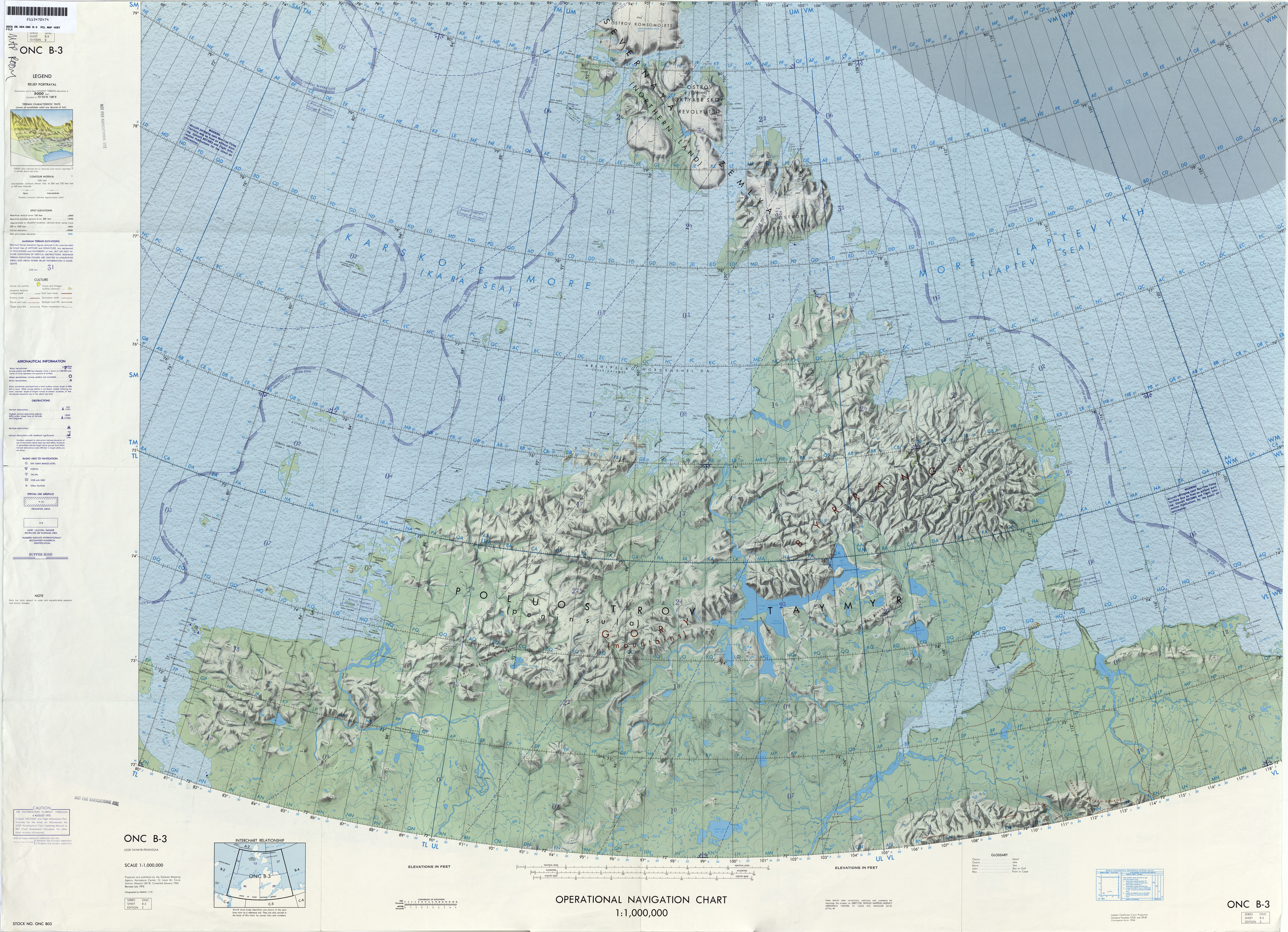
1975 map showing Severnaya Zemlya and the Taymyr Peninsula

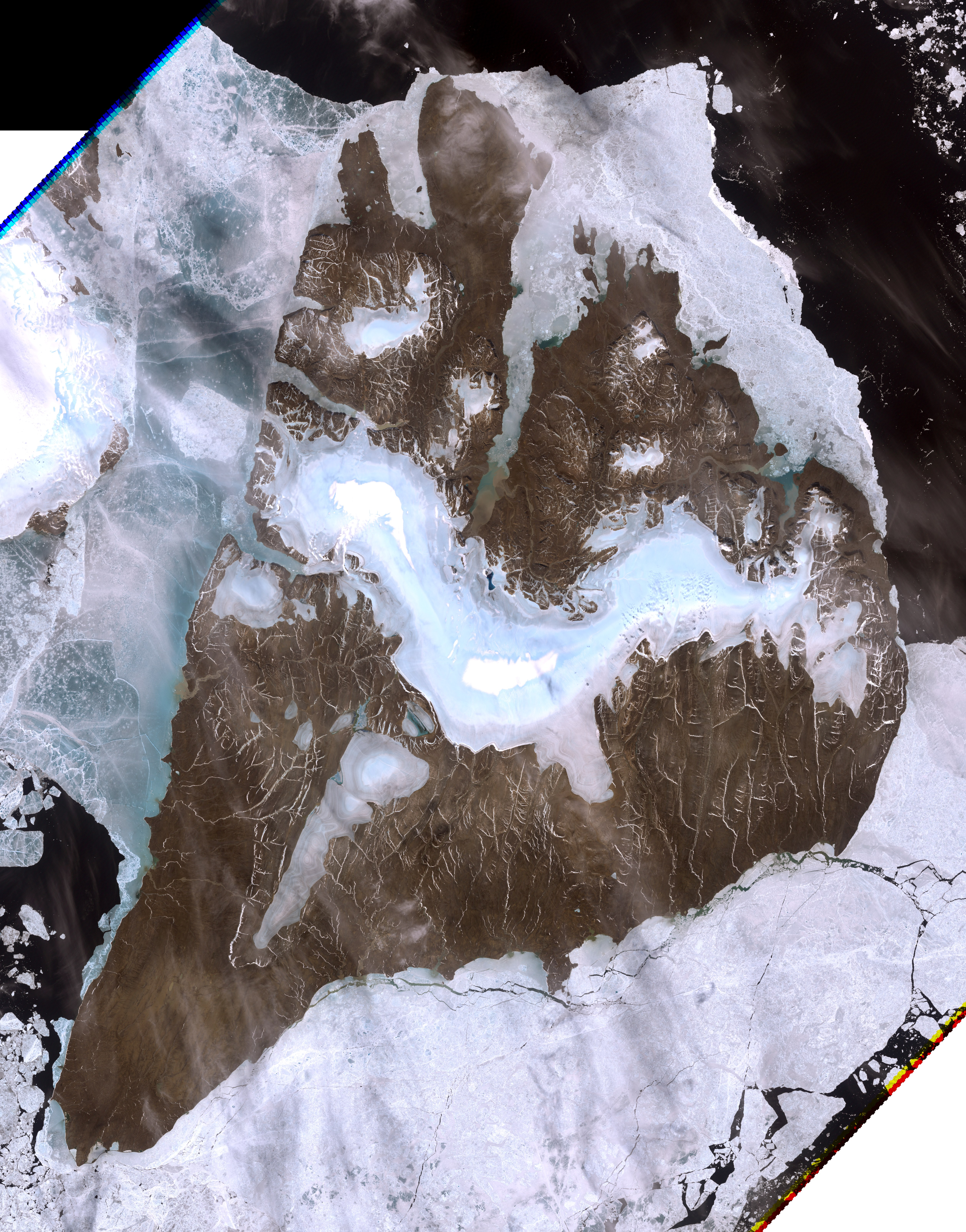
Landsat 7 image of Bolshevik Island

== See also ==
- List of research stations in the Arctic
