= Cape Neupokoyev =

Headland in Severnaya Zemlya, Russia

Cape Neupokoyev Мыс Неупокоева
- Cape
- Location of Cape Neupokoyev in Krasnoyarsk Krai
- Coordinates: 77°55′19″N 99°36′20″E
- Location: Bolshevik Island, Severnaya Zemlya, Russia
- Offshore water bodies: Kara Sea

Area
  - Total: Russian Far North

Cape Neupokoyev (Russian: Мыс Неупокоева, Mys Neupokoyeva) is a headland in Severnaya Zemlya, Russia.

== Geography ==
Cape Neupokoyev is located north of the Vilkitsky Strait and stretches out southwestwards into the Kara Sea. This headland is the southernmost point of Bolshevik Island and of Severnaya Zemlya. There are beach ridges and swales close to Cape Neupokoyev, with the Neupokoyev Lagoon (Russian: Лагуна Неупокоева) located right to the east of the headland.

== History ==
Adolf Erik Nordenskiöld, during the Vega Expedition in 1878, sailed very close to this cape but did not notice it. In 1882 Danish Arctic explorer and naval officer Andreas Peter Hovgaard, leader of the Dijmphna Expedition, sailed the waters of the Kara Sea in order to discover land north of the Taymyr Peninsula, but was unable to reach the peninsula's shores owing to thick ice. Later Nansen's Fram expedition in 1895, as well Eduard Toll's Russian polar expedition of 1900–02 on ship Zarya failed to note any traces of land to the north of the strait between the Kara Sea and the Laptev Sea.

The eastern shore of present-day Severnaya Zemlya was discovered by Boris Vilkitsky in 1913 during the Arctic Ocean Hydrographic Expedition, but he did not chart the western coast of Bolshevik Island. This headland was finally surveyed, mapped and named during the 1930–1932 expedition to the archipelago led by Georgy Ushakov and Nikolay Urvantsev. It was named after Konstantin Neupokoev (1884—1924), a naval officer, hydrographer and explorer of the Russian Hydrographic Service in Soviet times.

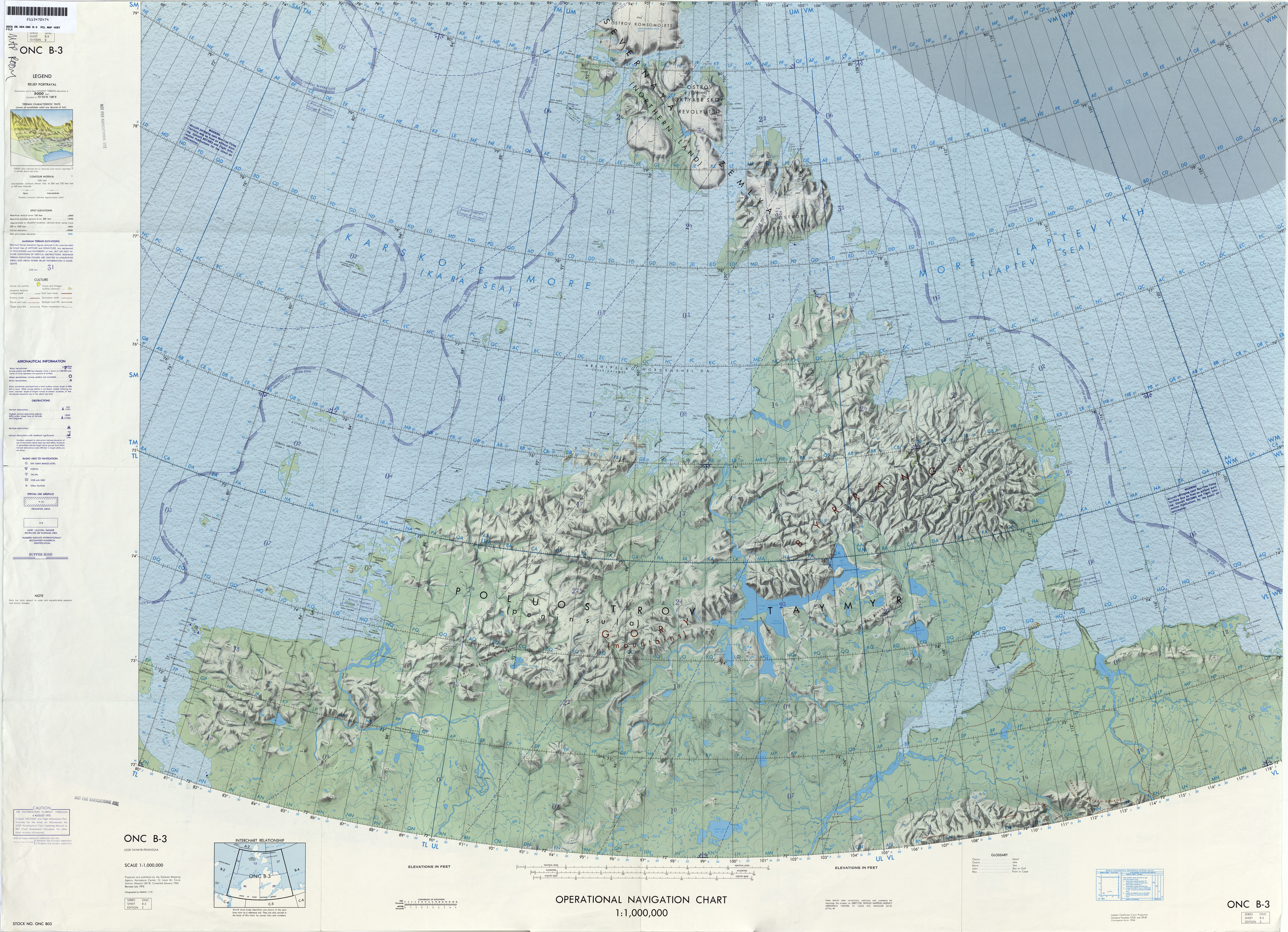
1975 map showing Severnaya Zemlya and the Taymyr Peninsula

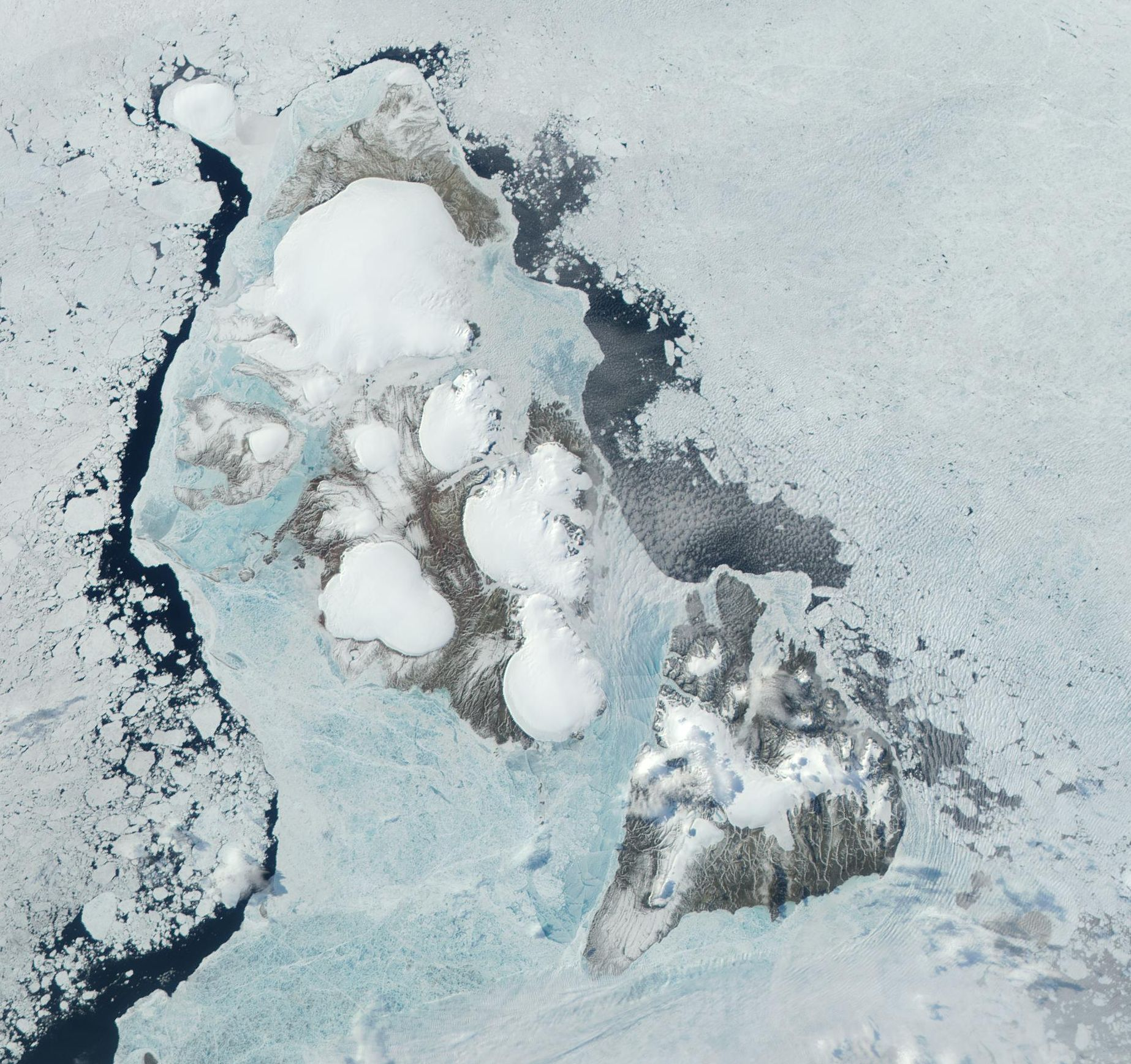
Terra-MODIS image of Severnaya Zemlya in 2001
