= Cape Unslicht =

Headland in Russia

Cape Unslicht Мыс Песчаный Cape Peschany
- Cape
- Location of Cape Unslicht in Krasnoyarsk Krai
- Coordinates: 79°25′4″N 102°31′0″E
- Location: Bolshevik Island, Severnaya Zemlya, Russia
- Offshore water bodies: Laptev Sea

Area
  - Total: Russian Far North

Cape Unslicht (Russian: Мыс Песчаный, Mys Peschanyy) is a headland in Severnaya Zemlya, Russia.

== Geography ==
Stretching out northwards NW of the Akhmatov Fjord and east of the mouth of Mikoyan Bay, this headland is the northernmost point of Bolshevik Island.

Cape Unslicht is one of the landmarks defining the limits of the Laptev Sea according to the International Hydrographic Organization.

== History ==
The Laptev Sea shore of present-day Severnaya Zemlya was discovered by Boris Vilkitsky in 1913 during the Arctic Ocean Hydrographic Expedition on behalf of the Russian Hydrographic Service, but he was unaware that there was a strait west of the cape between what is now Bolshevik Island and the islands further north, for the straits are frozen most of the year, forming a compact whole.

Named during the 1930–1932 expedition to the archipelago led by Georgy Ushakov and Nikolay Urvantsev after Zofia Unslicht, a German communist figure, this headland was renamed Mys Peschanyy (Sandy Cape) in Russian, following World War II.

There was a weather and scientific station near the cape, Peschanny Polar Station, now abandoned.

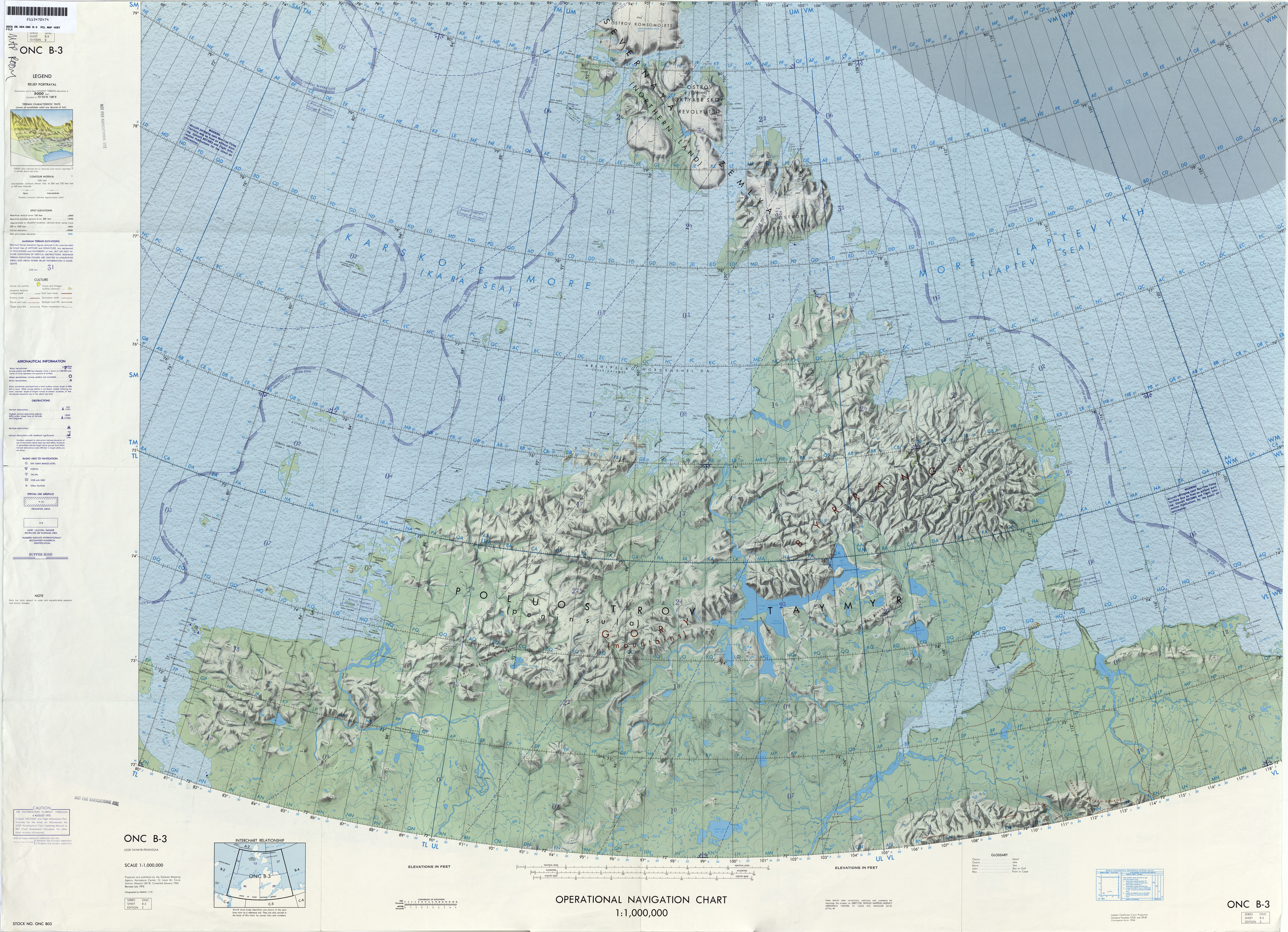
1975 map showing Severnaya Zemlya and the Taymyr Peninsula

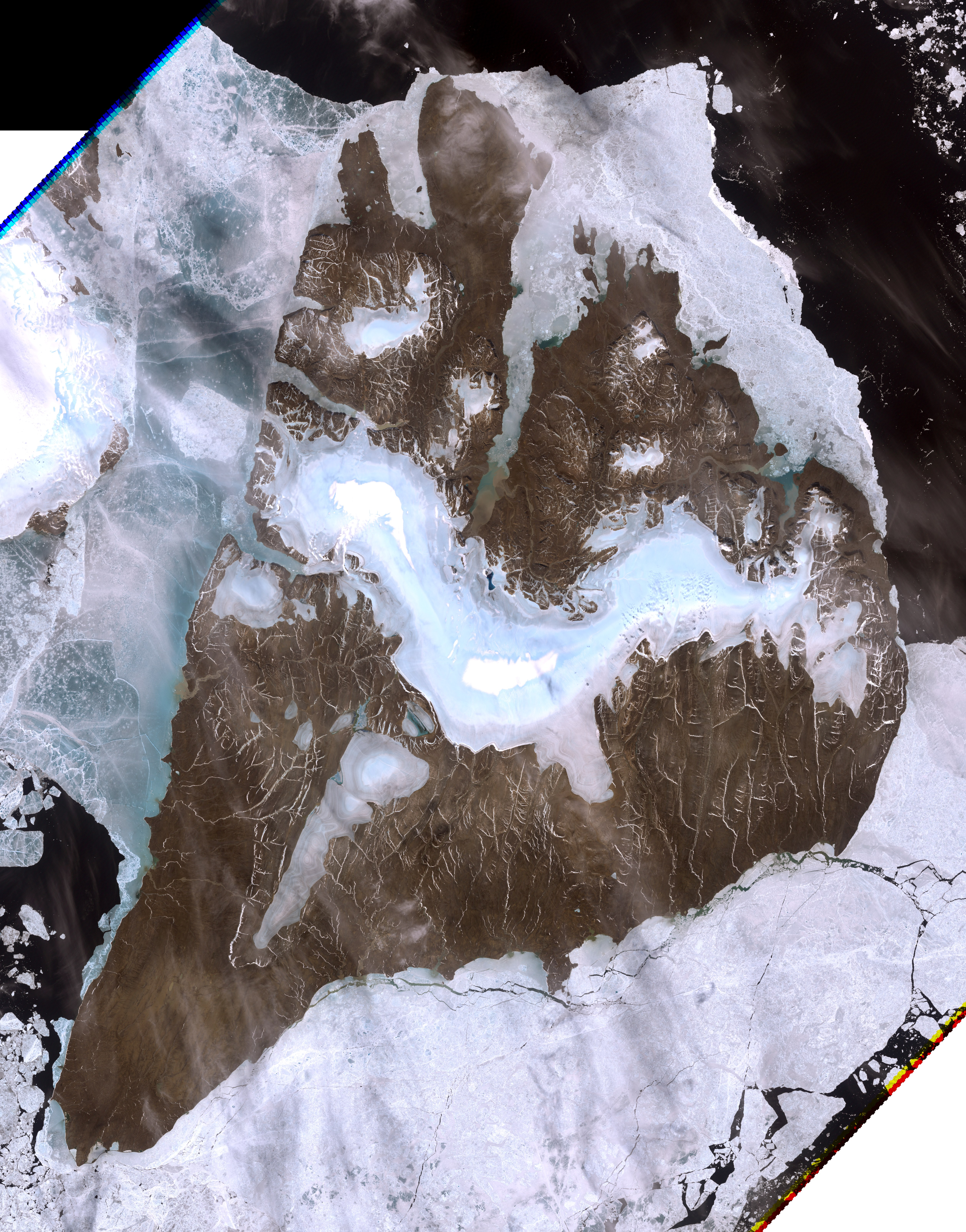
Landsat 7 image of Bolshevik Island

== See also ==
- List of research stations in the Arctic
