= Blizky Island =

Native name: остров Близкий
- Location within Krasnoyarsk Krai

Geography
- Location: Near Bolshevik Island
- Coordinates: 78.87°N 104.71°E
- Archipelago: Severnaya Zemlya
- Highest elevation: 6 m (20 ft)
- Highest point: unnamed

Administration
- Russia
- Federal subject: Krasnoyarsk Krai

Blizky Island (Russian: остров Близкий) is an island that is part of the Russian Severnaya Zemlya in the Laptev Sea. Administratively it is part of the district of the Krasnoyarsk Krai Taymyr in Siberian Federal District.

== Geography ==
The island is situated in the eastern part of the archipelago, in the east coast of Bolshevik Island, separated from it by a narrow channel. Blizky lies in the northern part of Neudach Bay (бухта Неудач) close to the mouth of the Neogidannoi River (река Неожиданной). To the northeast, at a distance of 4 km, lies the island named Morskoy.

Blizky has a rounded shape with a diameter of just over 2 km, its height does not exceed 6 m. In the north-west, near the coast, there is a small lagoon. At the north is a geodetic point.

== See also ==
- List of islands of Russia
