= Mill Island (Nunavut) =

Island in Nunavut, Canada

- Location within Nunavut Location within Canada

Geography
- Location: Hudson Strait
- Coordinates: 64°00′N 77°48′W
- Archipelago: Arctic Archipelago
- Area: 181 km^{2} (70 sq mi)

Administration
- Canada
- Territory: Nunavut
- Region: Qikiqtaaluk

Demographics
- Population: Uninhabited
- Ethnic groups: Source: Mill Island at Atlas of Canada

Mill Island is an uninhabited Arctic island located in Hudson Bay between Foxe Channel and Hudson Strait. It is south of Baffin Island's Foxe Peninsula, and north of Nottingham and Salisbury islands. Mill Island is part of the Qikiqtaaluk Region of the Canadian territory of Nunavut. Morrissey Harbour is a bay on the island's north coast.

Putnam Island is a smaller island, less than a mile away, off the east coast of Mill Island. Another small island, unnamed, is off the west coast of Mill Island, separated by Hurin Throughlet.
