= Salikuit Islands =

Island group in Nunavut, Canada

- Location within Nunavut Location within Canada

Geography
- Location: Northern Canada
- Coordinates: 56°22′N 77°40′W
- Archipelago: Arctic Archipelago
- Area: 65 km^{2} (25 sq mi)

Administration
- Canada
- Nunavut: Nunavut
- Region: Qikiqtaaluk

Demographics
- Population: Uninhabited

The Salikuit Islands are an uninhabited island group in the Qikiqtaaluk Region of Nunavut, Canada. The 103 island archipelago is located in eastern Hudson Bay between the Belcher Islands and the western coast of Quebec. The closest communities are the Inuit hamlets of Umiujaq, Quebec, 60 km to the east on the coast of Hudson Bay, and Sanikiluaq, 75 km (47 mi) to the west on Flaherty Island.

== Geography ==
The islands' habitat is characterized by low lying tundra and rocky marine shores. While twelve of the islands are between 50 and 1,500 ha in size, the rest are smaller than 50 ha.

== Fauna ==
The Salikuit Islands are a Canadian Important Bird Area (#NU032) and a Key Migratory Terrestrial Bird Site (NU Site 55). Notable bird species include Arctic tern, common eider, glaucous gull, and herring gull.
