= Mikoyan Bay =

Bay in Severnaya Zemlya, Krasnoyarsk Krai, Russia

- Залив Микояна (Russian)
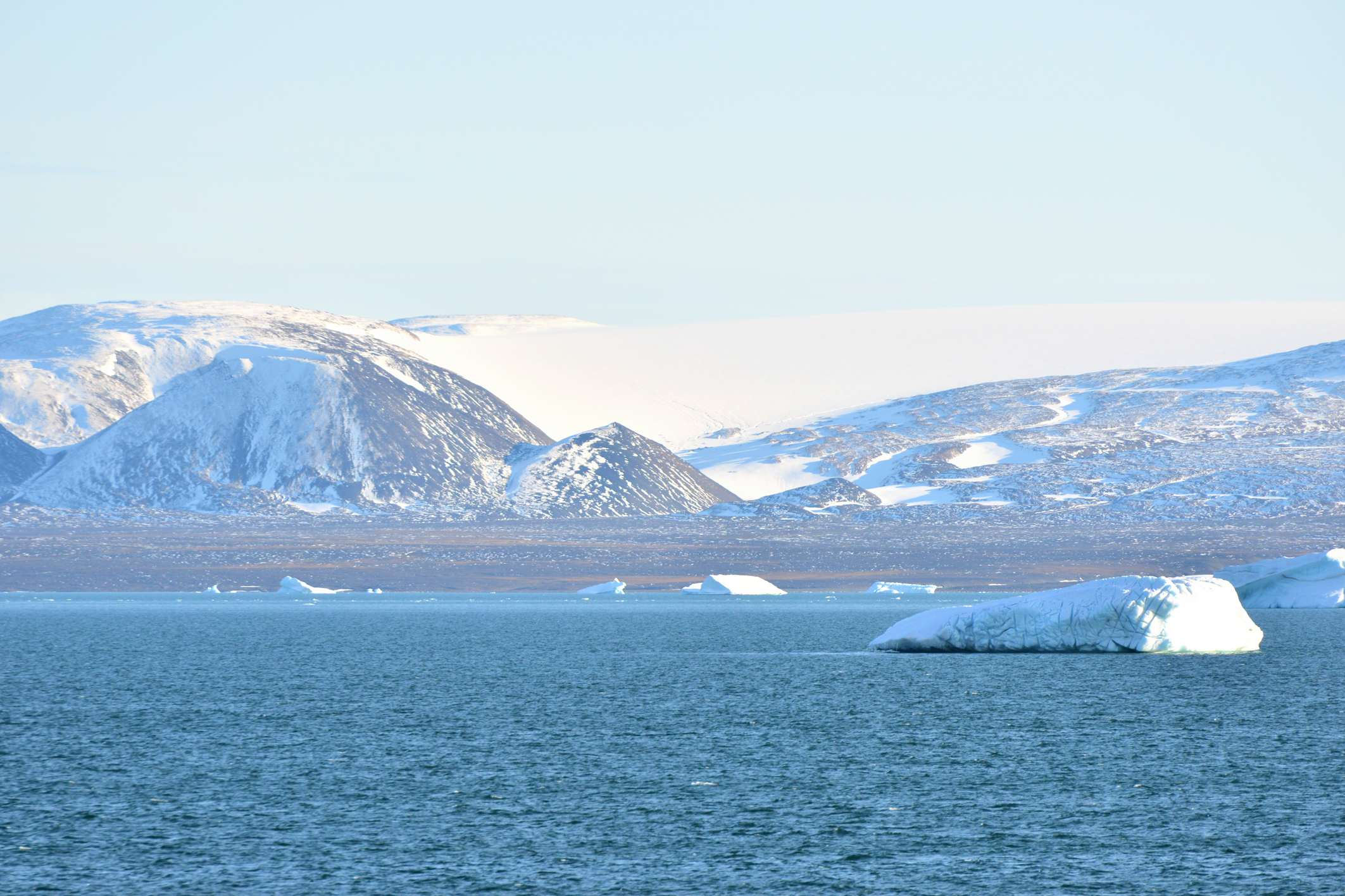
- View of the shore of Mikoyan Bay

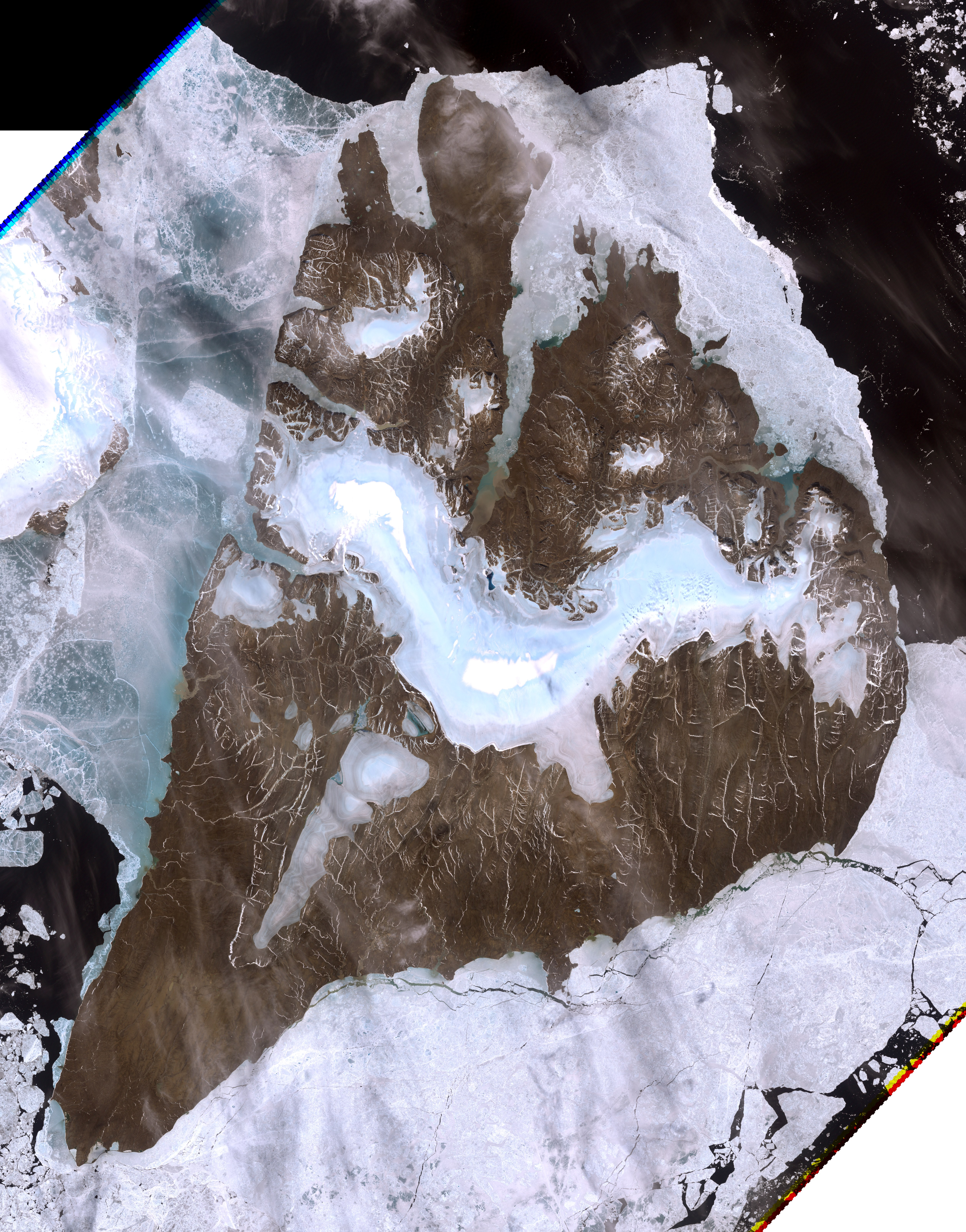
- Landsat image of Bolshevik island

- Location in Krasnoyarsk Krai
- Location: Bolshevik Island, Severnaya Zemlya, Krasnoyarsk Krai
- Coordinates: 79°18′N 102°4′E
- Ocean/sea sources: Shokalsky Strait
- Basin countries: Russia
- Max. length: 17 km (11 mi)
- Max. width: 5.5 km (3.4 mi)
- Islands: Dvukh Tovarishchey and Sportivnyy

Mikoyan Bay (Russian: Залив Микояна, Zaliv Mikoyana) is a bay in Severnaya Zemlya, Krasnoyarsk Krai, Russia. It is clogged by ice most of the year with many icebergs in the strait off the mouth of the bay.

== History ==
This bay was named by the 1930–1932 expedition to the archipelago led by Georgy Ushakov and Nikolay Urvantsev after Soviet statesman Anastas Mikoyan (1895–1978).

== Geography ==
Mikoyan Bay is a body of water in the northeastern area of Bolshevik Island, the southernmost island of Severnaya Zemlya. It is located southwest of Cape Unslicht on the Shokalsky Strait shore of the island. The headland on the western side of the mouth of the bay is Cape Baranov.

The bay extends in a roughly north–south direction for about 17 km (11 mi). The basin inside the bay has smooth mountains on both flanks. Mikoyan Bay is about 5.5 km wide, the shores of both sides running almost parallel to each other southwards from its mouth. There are two little islets in the bay, Dvukh Tovarishchey (Russian: двух товарищей) close to the eastern coast, and smaller Sportivnyy (Russian: Спортивный) 3 km (1.9 mi) further south.

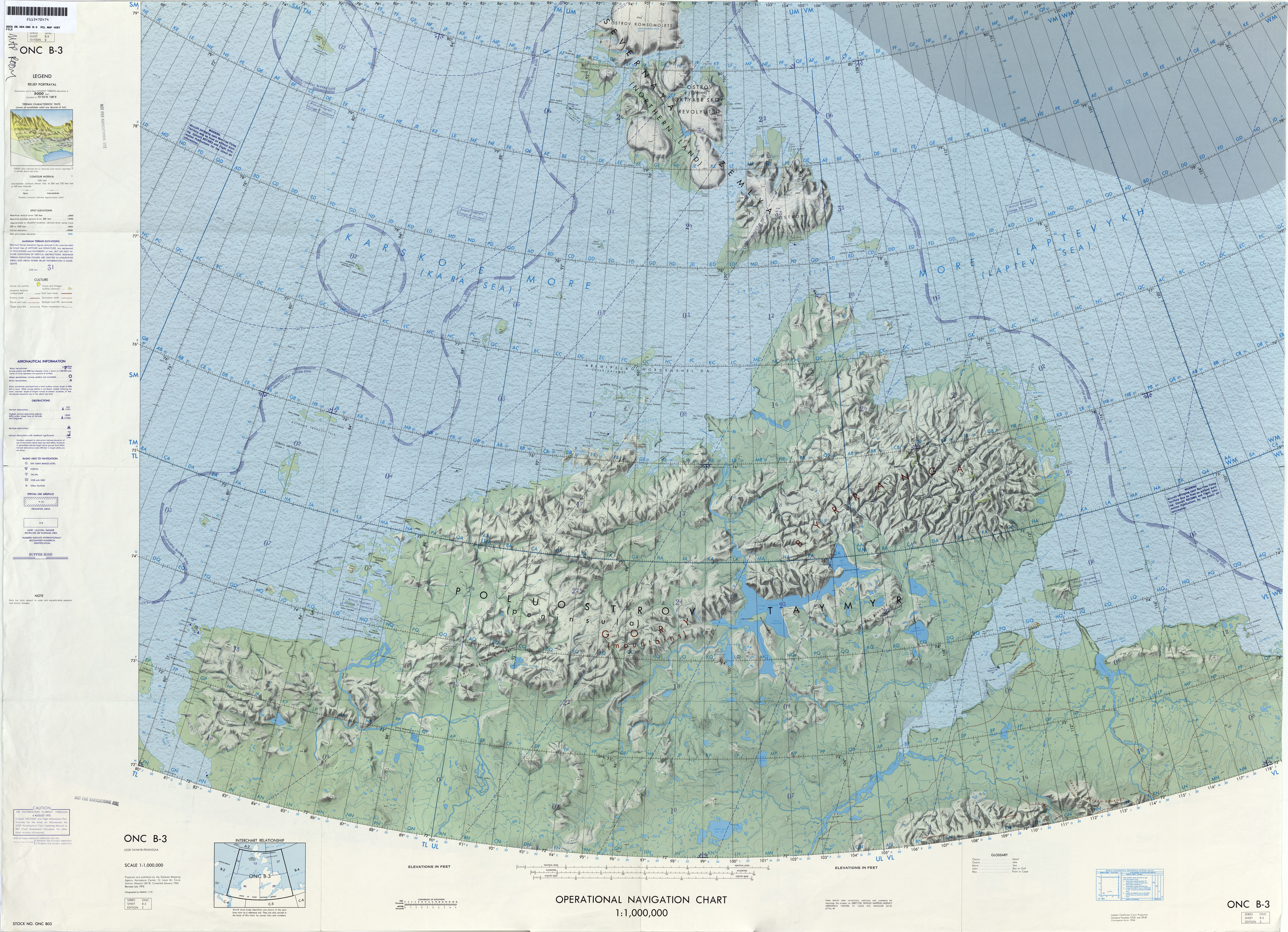
1975 map showing Severnaya Zemlya and the Taymyr Peninsula

== See also ==
- List of fjords of Russia
