= Salisbury Island (Nunavut) =

Island in the Qikiqtaaluk Region, Nunavut, Canada

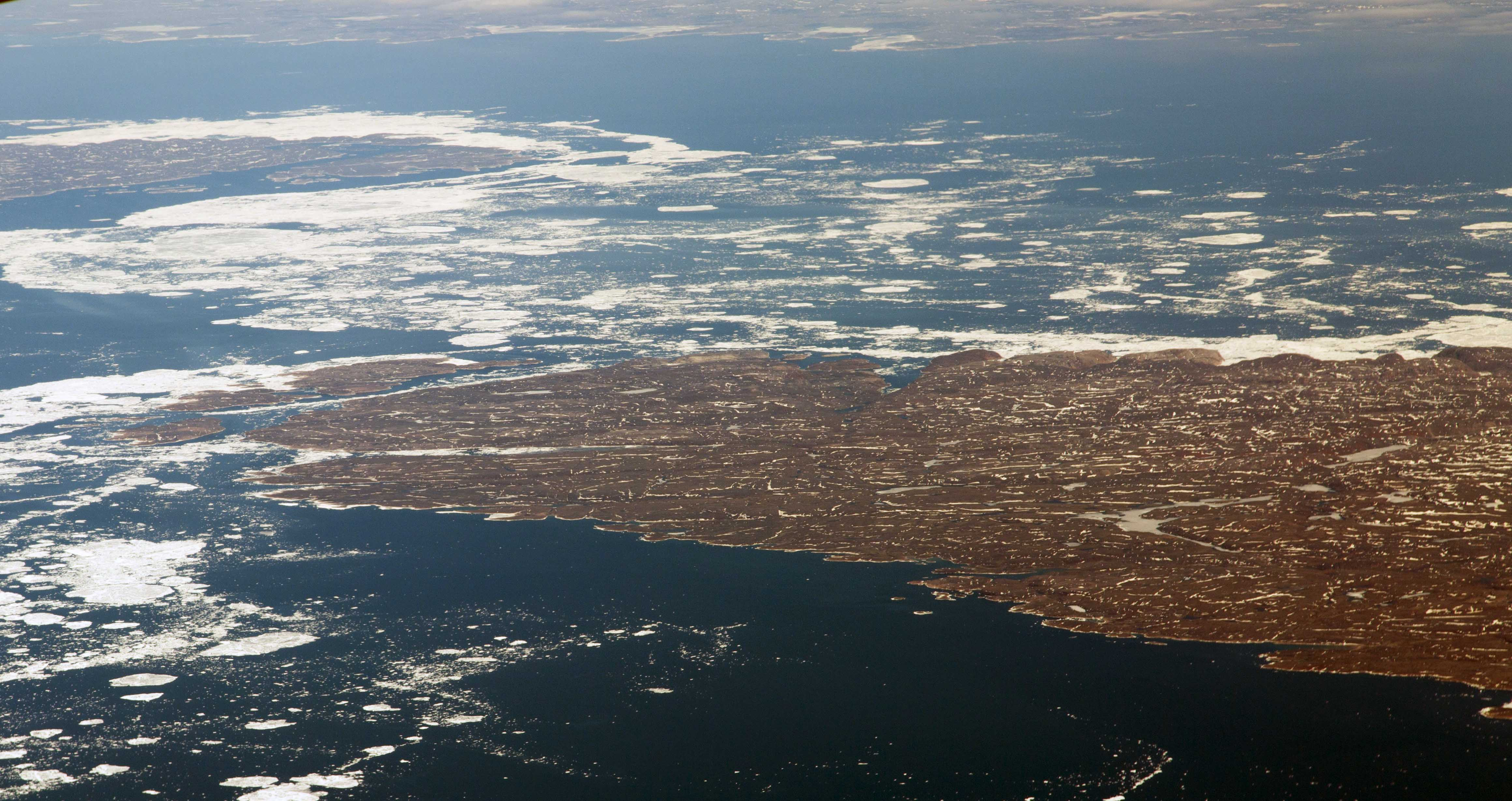
- Salisbury Island, Nunavut, June 25, 2014

- Location within Nunavut Location within Canada

Geography
- Location: Hudson Strait
- Coordinates: 63°35′N 77°00′W
- Area: 804 km^{2} (310 sq mi)
- Coastline: 278 km (172.7 mi)

Administration
- Canada
- Territory: Nunavut
- Region: Qikiqtaaluk
- Source: Salisbury Island at Atlas of Canada

Salisbury Island is one of the uninhabited Canadian arctic islands in the Qikiqtaaluk Region, Nunavut. It is located in Hudson Strait, and has an area of 804 km^{2} (310 sq mi).
