= Koch Island =

Uninhabited island off Baffin Island in northern Canada

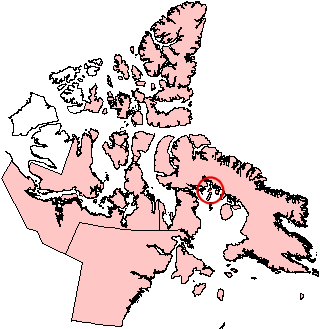
- Koch Island, Nunavut.

- Location within Nunavut Location within Canada

Geography
- Location: Foxe Basin
- Coordinates: 69°38′N 78°20′W
- Archipelago: Arctic Archipelago
- Area: 458 km^{2} (177 sq mi)

Administration
- Canada
- Nunavut: Nunavut
- Region: Qikiqtaaluk

Demographics
- Population: Uninhabited

Koch Island is one of the Canadian Arctic islands in Qikiqtaaluk Region, Nunavut, Canada. Located in Foxe Basin, it is an uninhabited Baffin Island offshore island. Located at 69°38'N 78°20'W, it has an area of 458 km^{2} (177 sq mi).
