= Bolshevik Island =

Island in Severnaya Zemlya, Krasnoyarsk Krai, Russian Arctic

Native name: о́стров Большеви́к
- Bolshevik Island, Russia

- Location within Krasnoyarsk Krai

Geography
- Location: Arctic
- Coordinates: 78.630006°N 102.480469°E
- Archipelago: Severnaya Zemlya
- Area: 11,270 km^{2} (4,350 sq mi)
- Area rank: 66th
- Highest elevation: 935 m (3068 ft)
- Highest point: unnamed

Administration
- Russia

Demographics
- Population: 0

Bolshevik Island (Russian: о́стров Большеви́к, pronounced [ˈostrəf bəlʲʂɨˈvʲik]) is an island in Severnaya Zemlya, Krasnoyarsk Krai, Russian Arctic. The island is named after the political faction of the Soviet Union.

== History ==
The island, together with the eastern coast of what was named Emperor Nicholas II Land, was discovered by Boris Vilkitsky at the time of the 1913 Arctic Ocean Hydrographic Expedition. Its insularity, however, wasn't proven until 1931, when Georgy Ushakov and Nikolay Urvantsev charted the archipelago during their 1930–32 expedition.

Prima Polar Station, currently the only Polar station operating in Severnaya Zemlya, is located in this island near Cape Baranov.

== Geography ==
It is the southernmost island and the second largest island in the group. The area of this island has been estimated at 11,270 km^{2} (4,350 sq mi). The island is mountainous reaching a height of 935 m. About 31% of Bolshevik Island, totaling over 3,300 km^{2} (1,300 sq mi), is covered by glaciers, the largest are Leningrad Glacier, Semyonov-Tyan-Shansky Glacier, Kropotkin Glacier, Mushketov Glacier and Aerosyomki Glacier. Most of these ice formations do not reach the sea, ending in moraines in valleys or coastal plains having a sparse vegetation of moss and lichen.

Parts of the shore of the island are deeply indented, with Mikoyan Bay in the northopening to the Shokalsky Strait, as well as fjords such as Akhmatov Fjord, Thaelmann Fjord, Spartak Fjord and Partizan Fjord. Cape Unslicht (Mys Peschanyy) is the northernmost point of Bolshevik Island and Cape Neupokoyev at the SW end the southernmost. Ostrov Tash is a small island located on Bolshevik's southern shore. Lavrov Island and Blizky Island are located off the NE shore and Ostrov Lishniy off its northern tip.

The group formed by the smaller Maly Taymyr and Starokadomsky islands is located further offshore off the southeastern end.

=== Image gallery ===
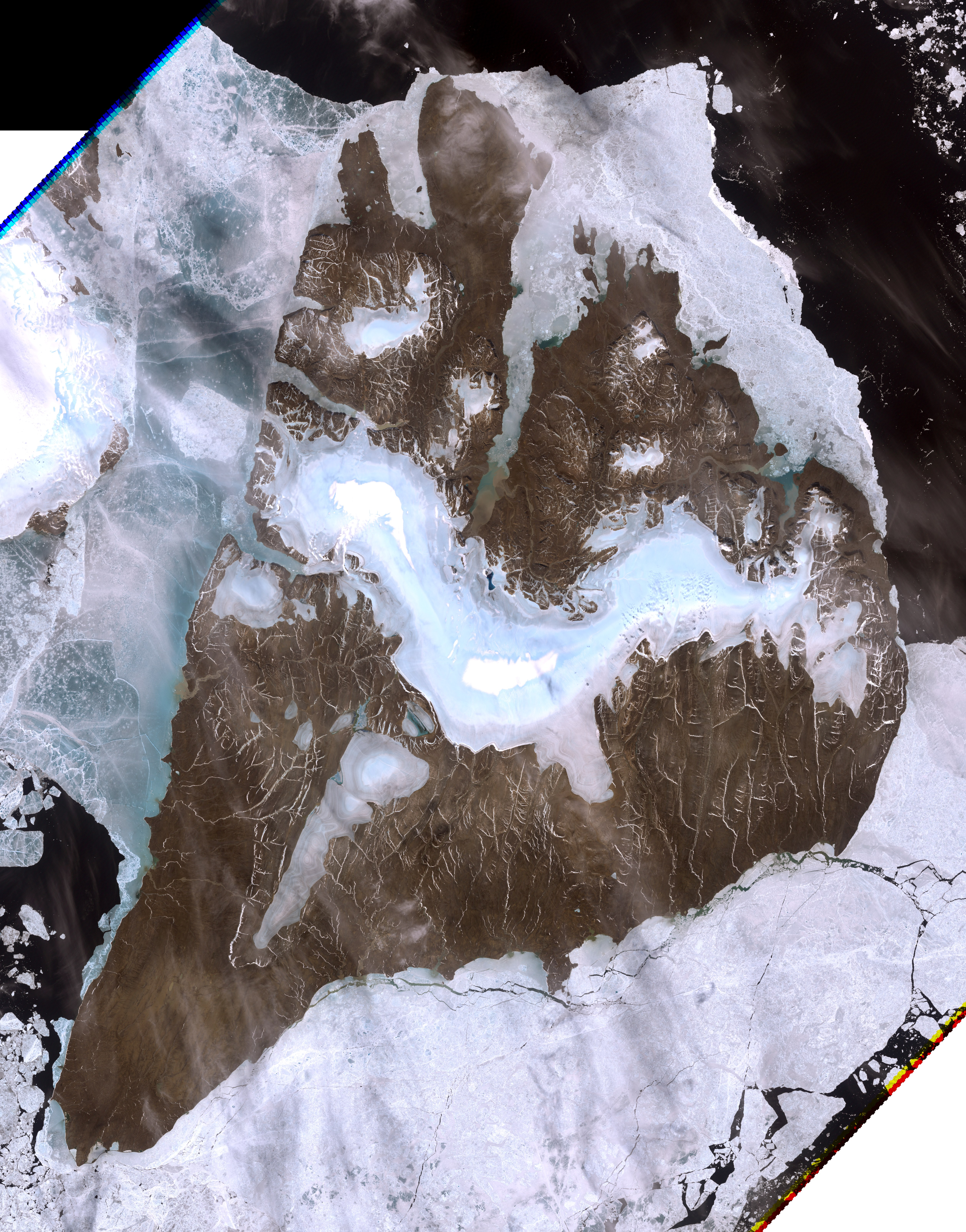
Bolshevik Island image (Landsat-7 1999-07-29)

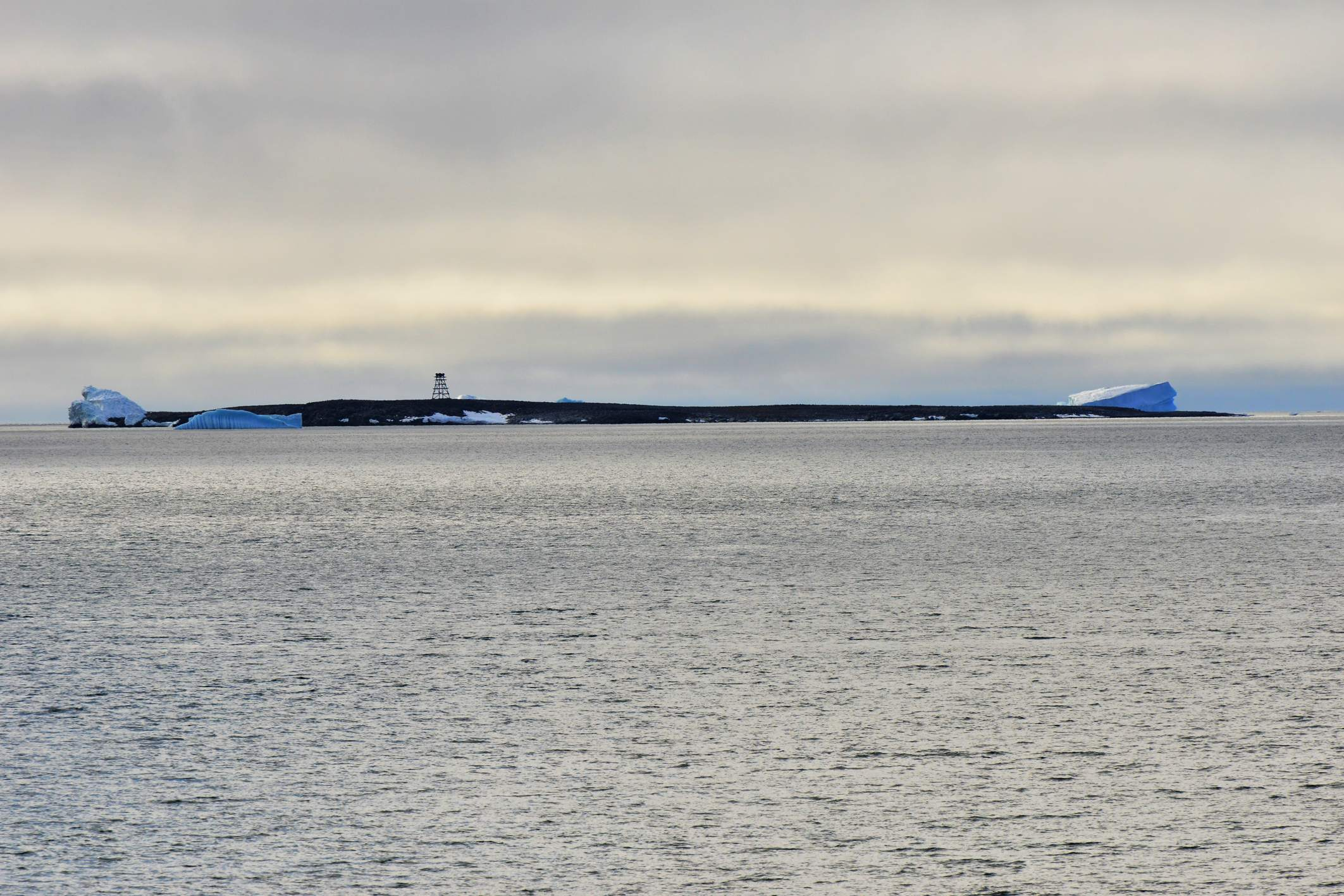
Southern coast of
Bolshevik Island:
Antsev Point (78°11’N, 103°7’E)

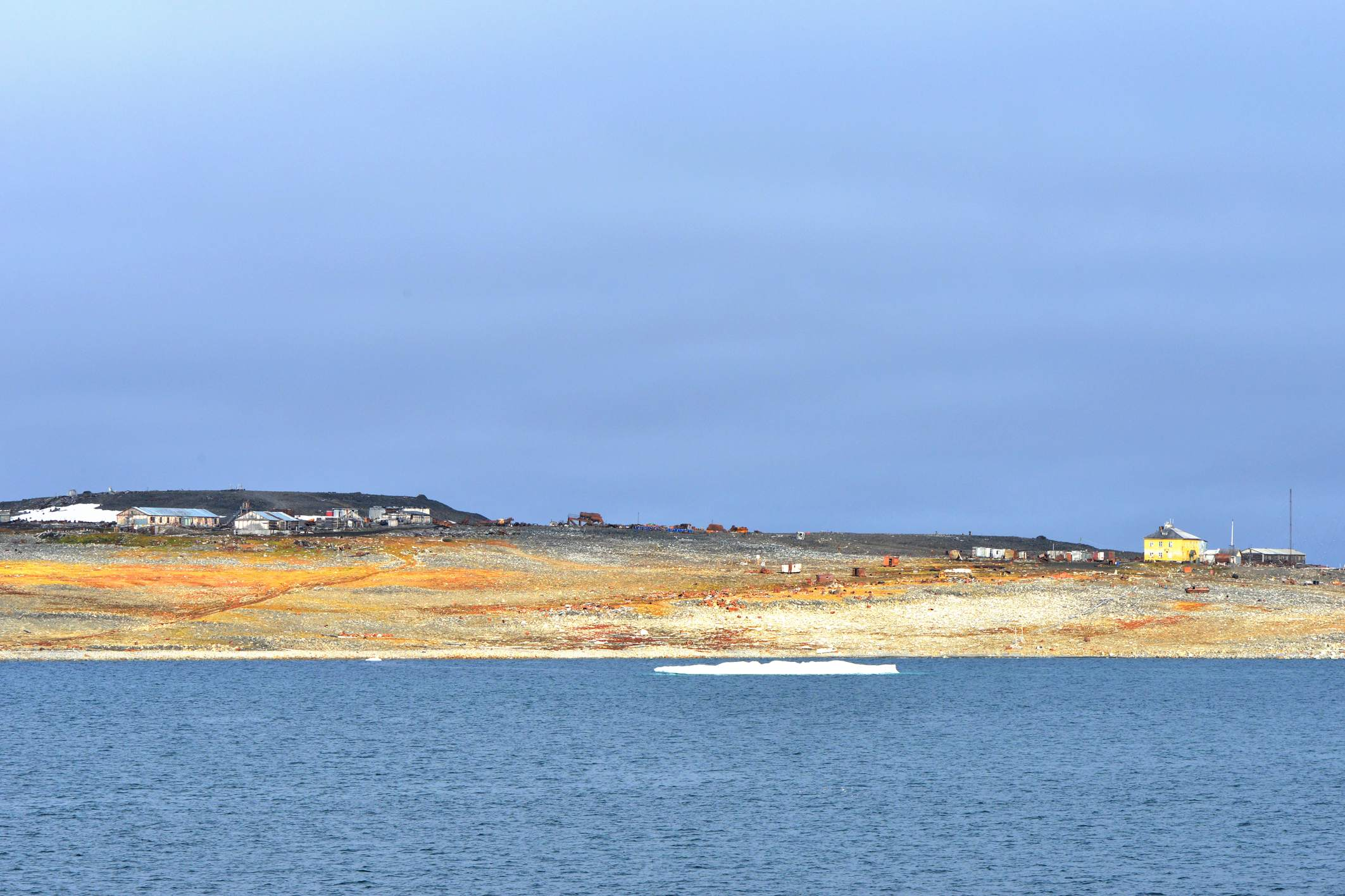
Southern coast of
Bolshevik Island:
Solnechny Bay (78°11’N, 103°7’E)

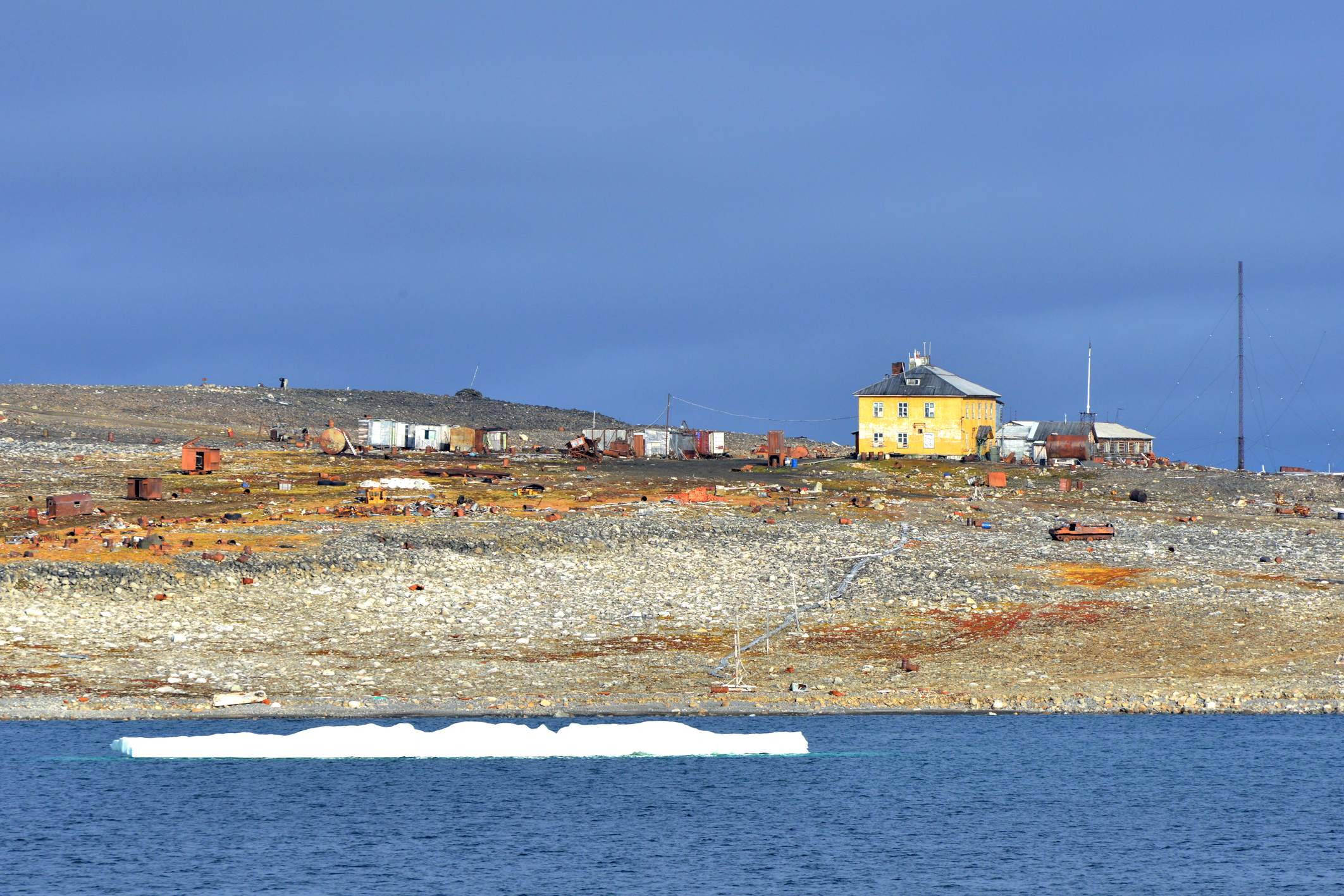
Southern coast of
Bolshevik Island:
Solnechny Bay (78°11’N, 103°7’E)

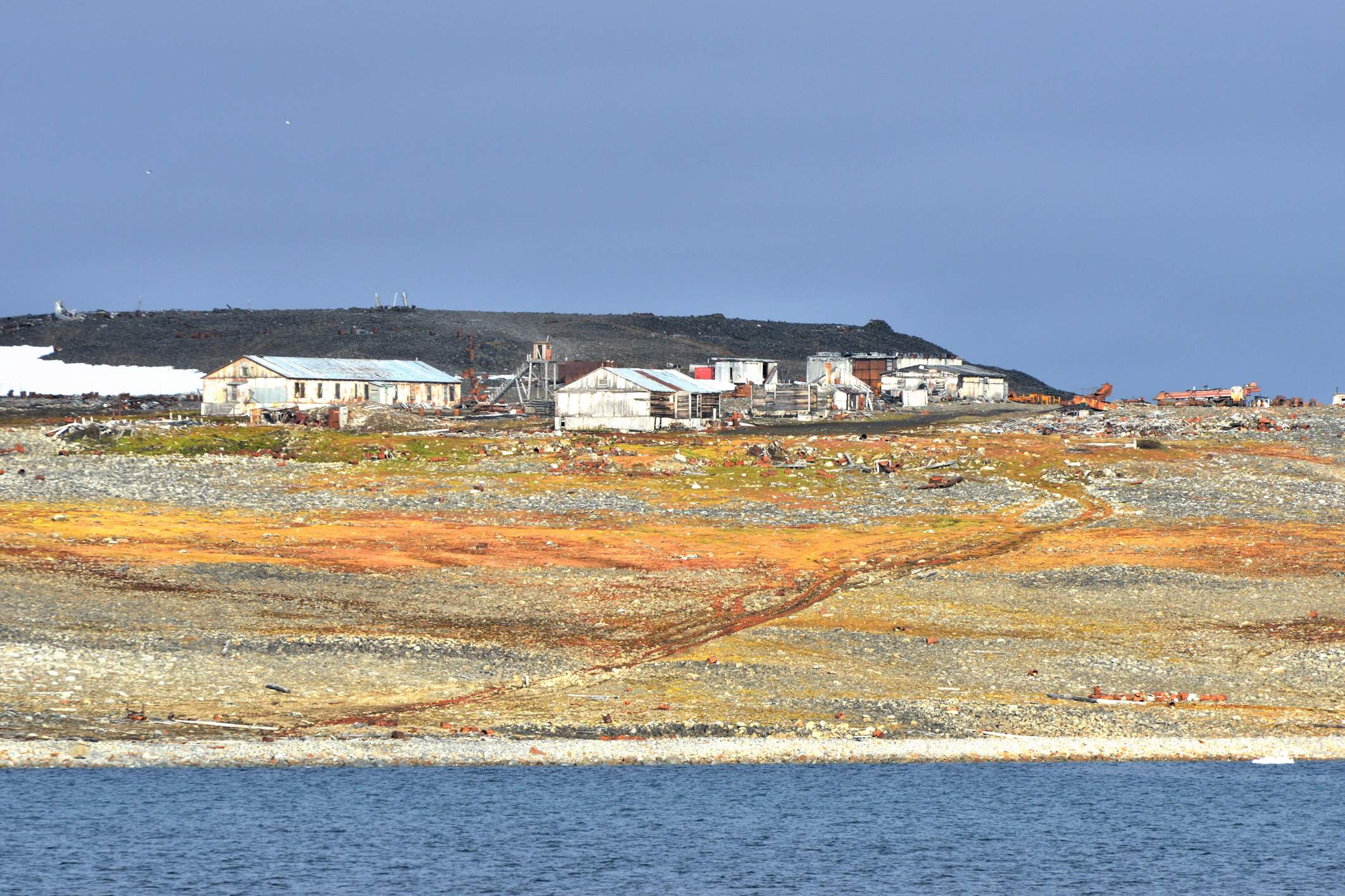
Southern coast of
Bolshevik Island:
Solnechny Bay (78°11’N, 103°7’E)

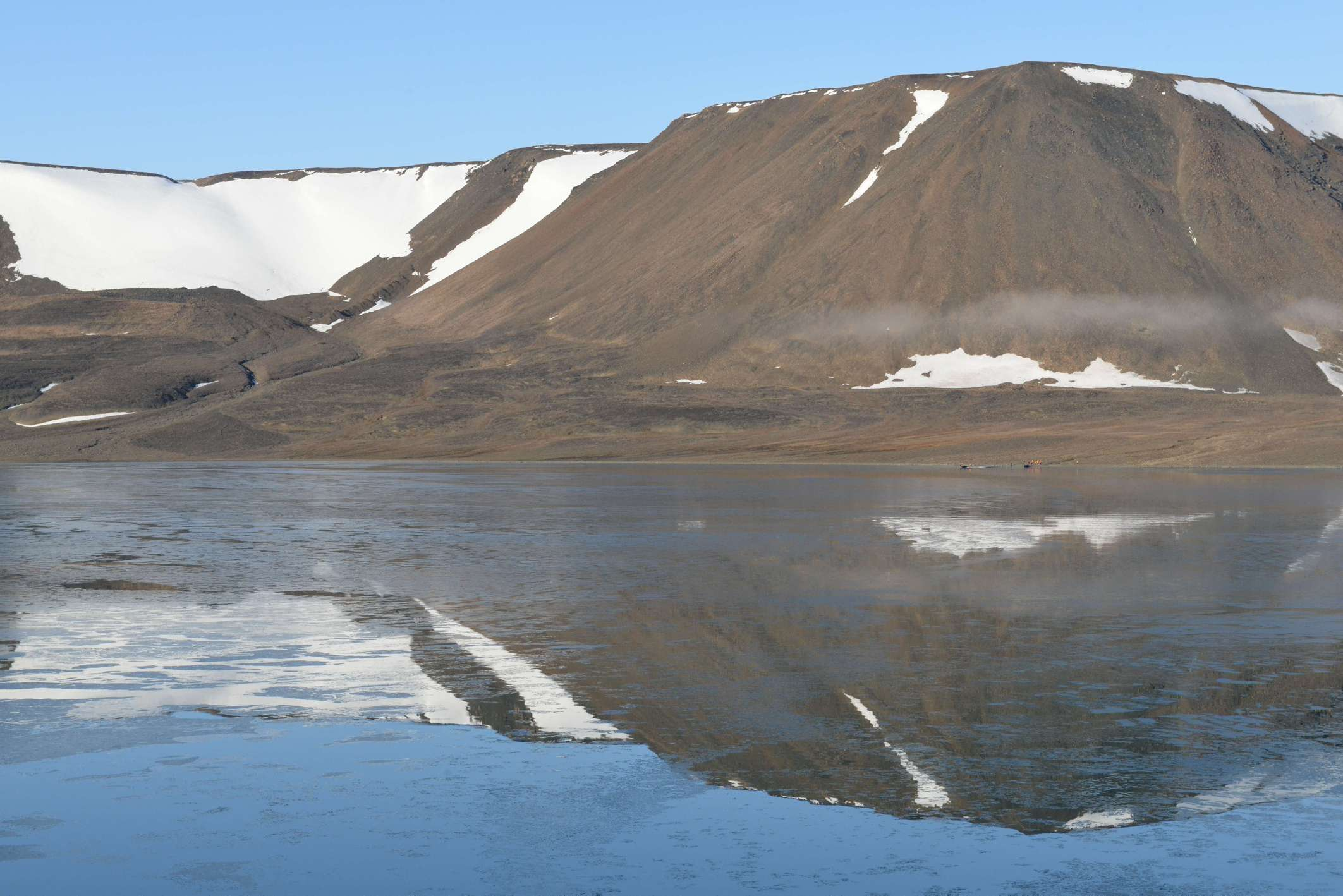
Bolshevik Island:
Akhmatov Fjord (79°30‘N, 103°12‘E)

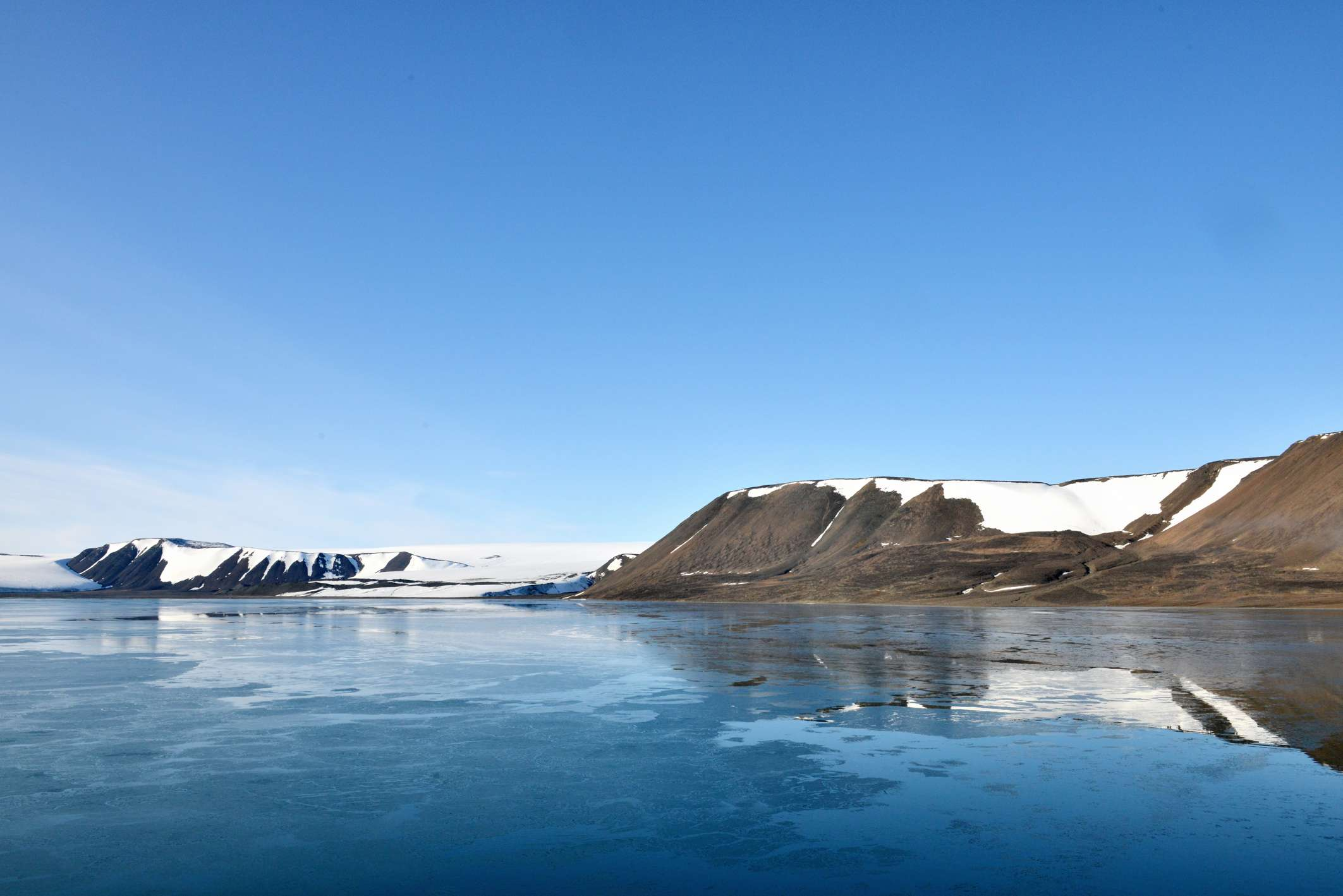
Bolshevik Island:
Akhmatov Fjord (79°30‘N, 103°12‘E)

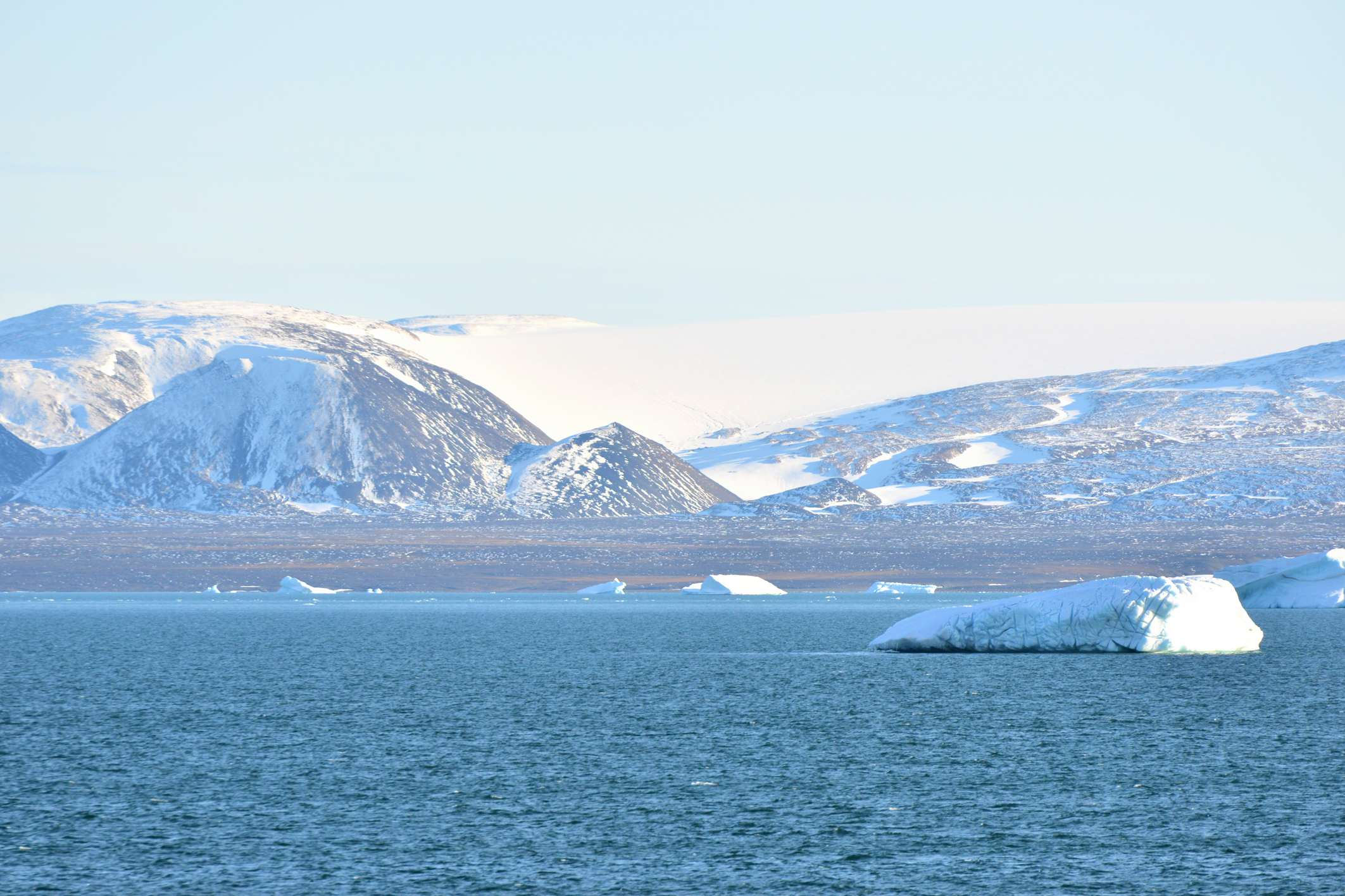
Bolshevik Island:
Mikoyan Bay at one of the world's most spectacular iceberg roads

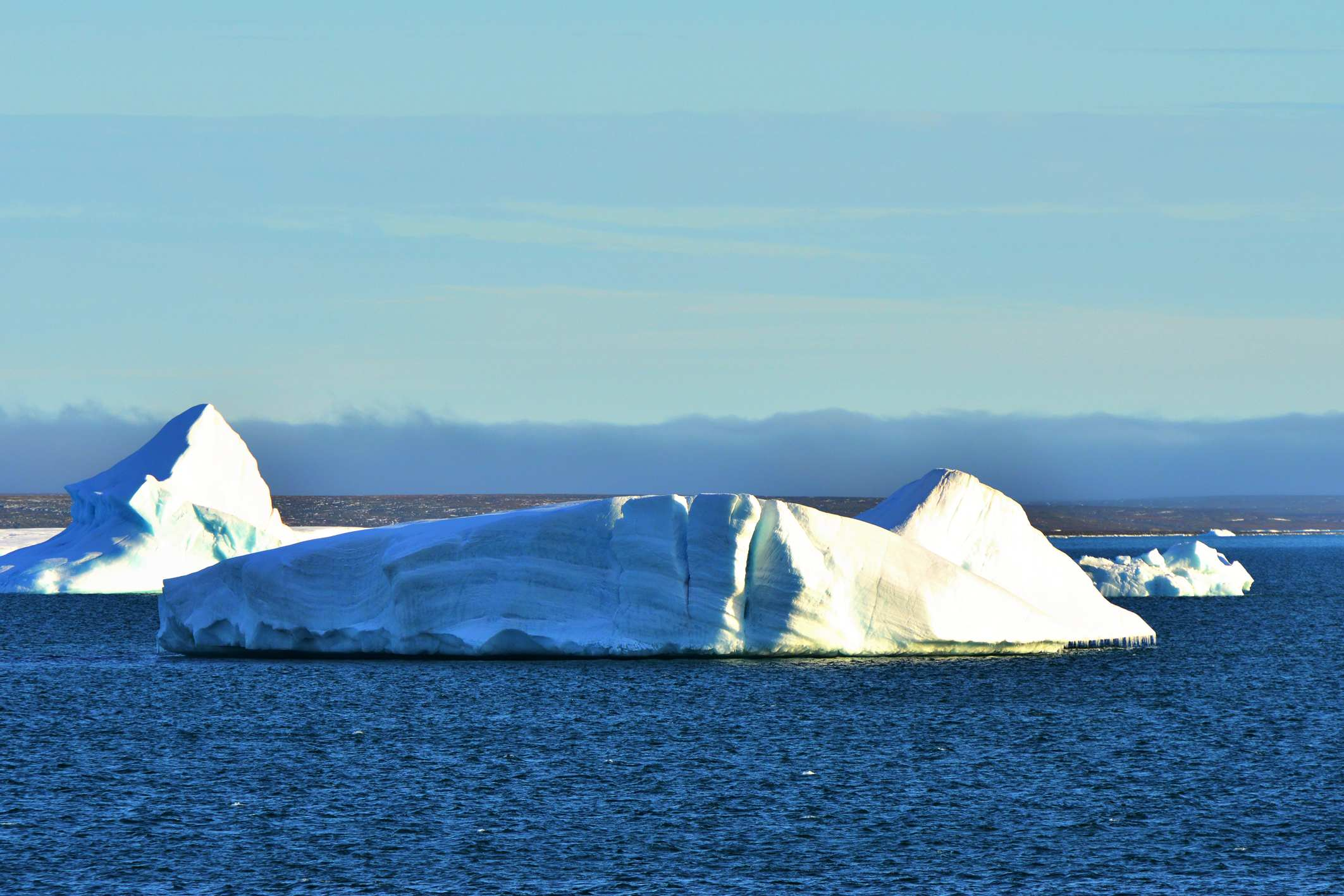
Bolshevik Island:
Mikoyan Bay (79°22‘N, 102°E)

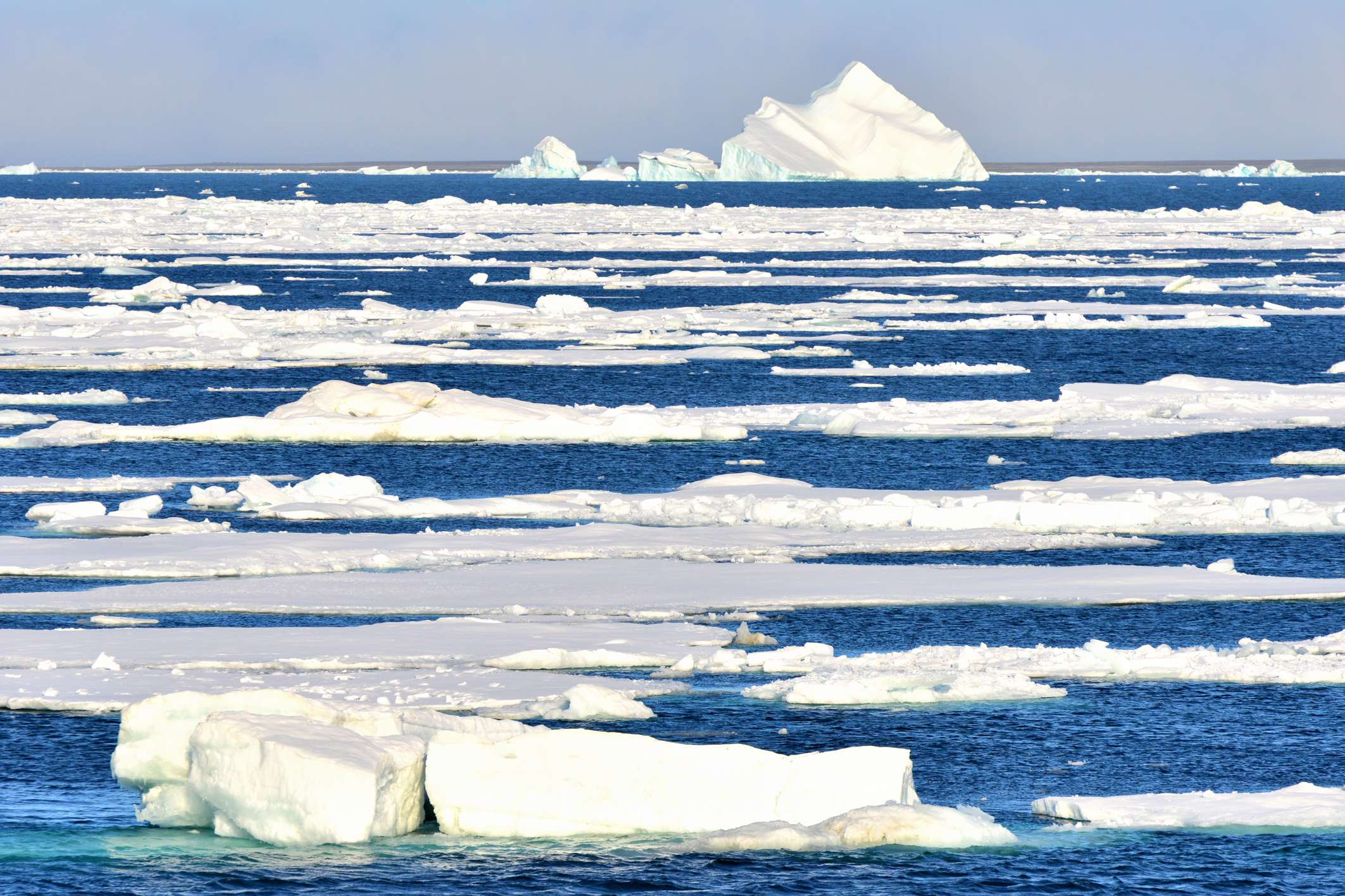
Northeast coast of Bolshevik Island:
iceberg road (79°28‘N, 103°E)

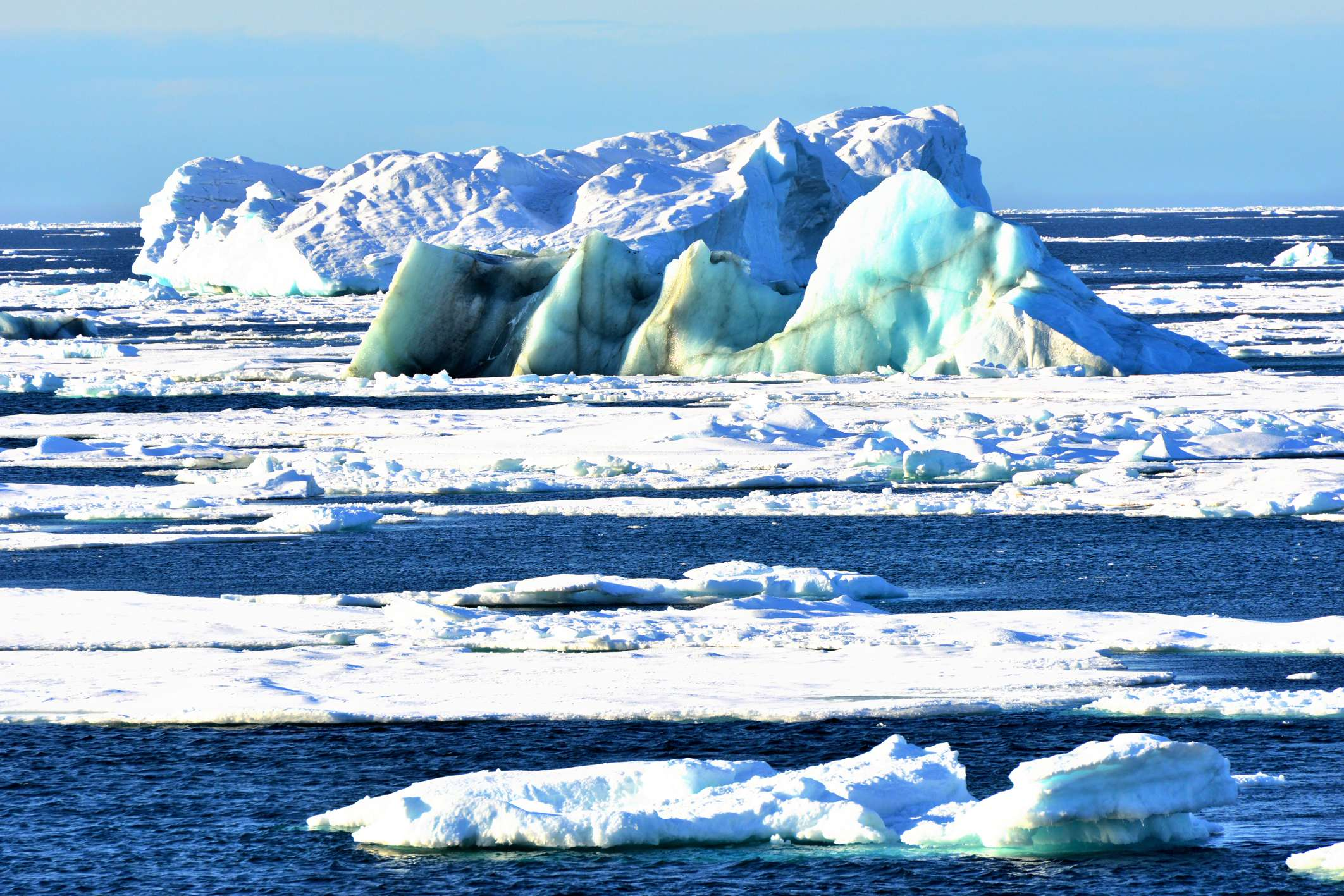
Northeast coast of Bolshevik Island:
iceberg road (79°28‘N, 103°E)

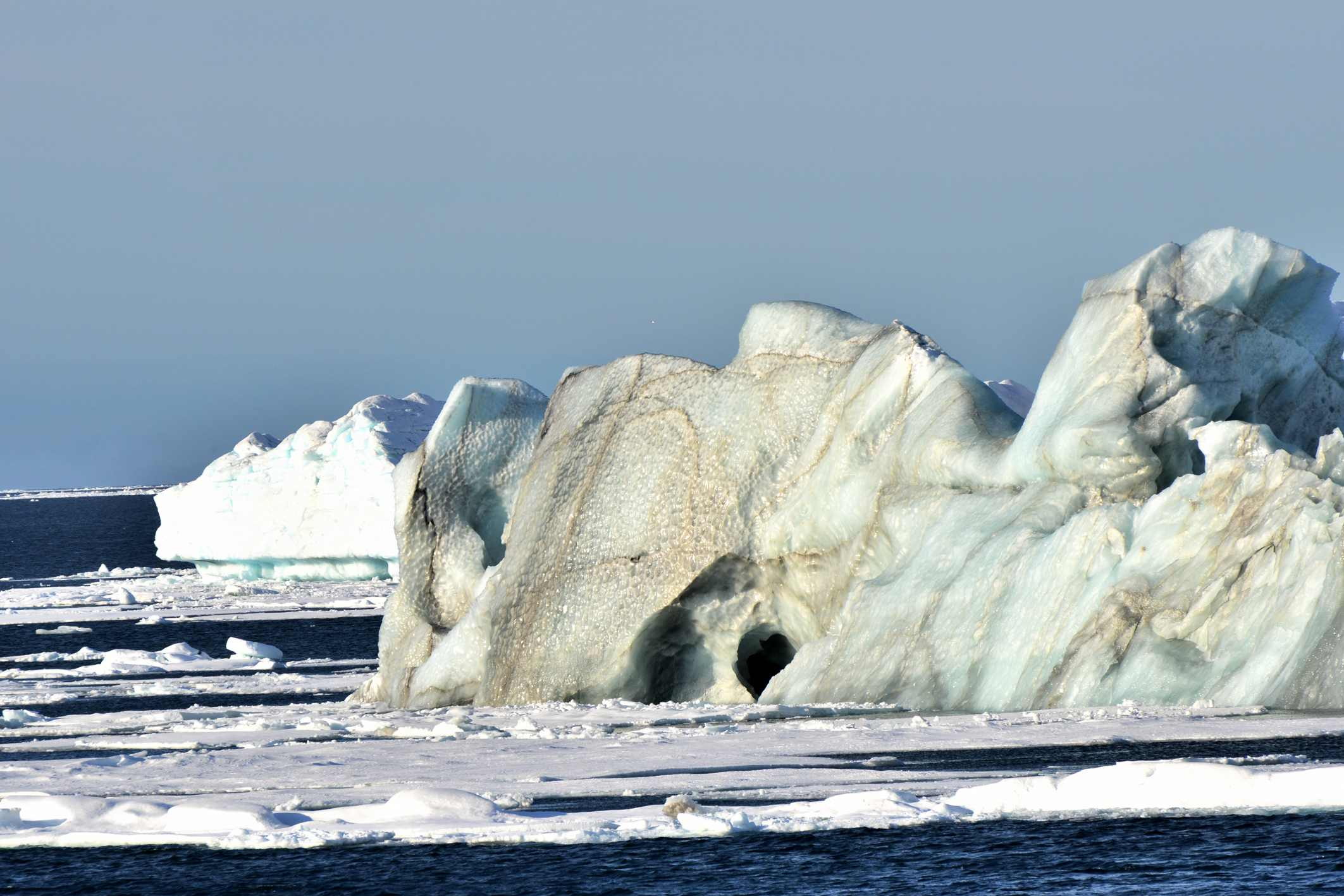

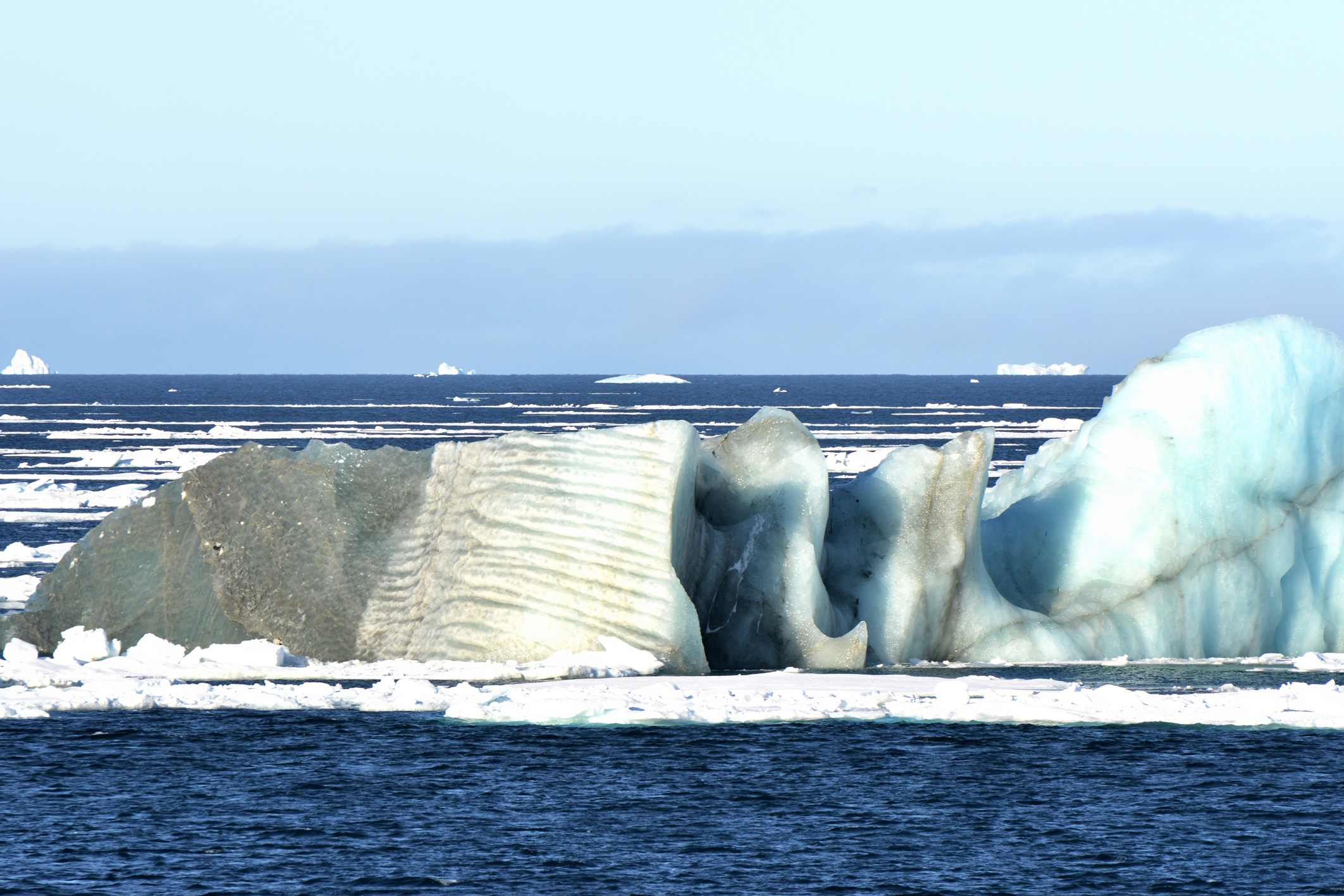

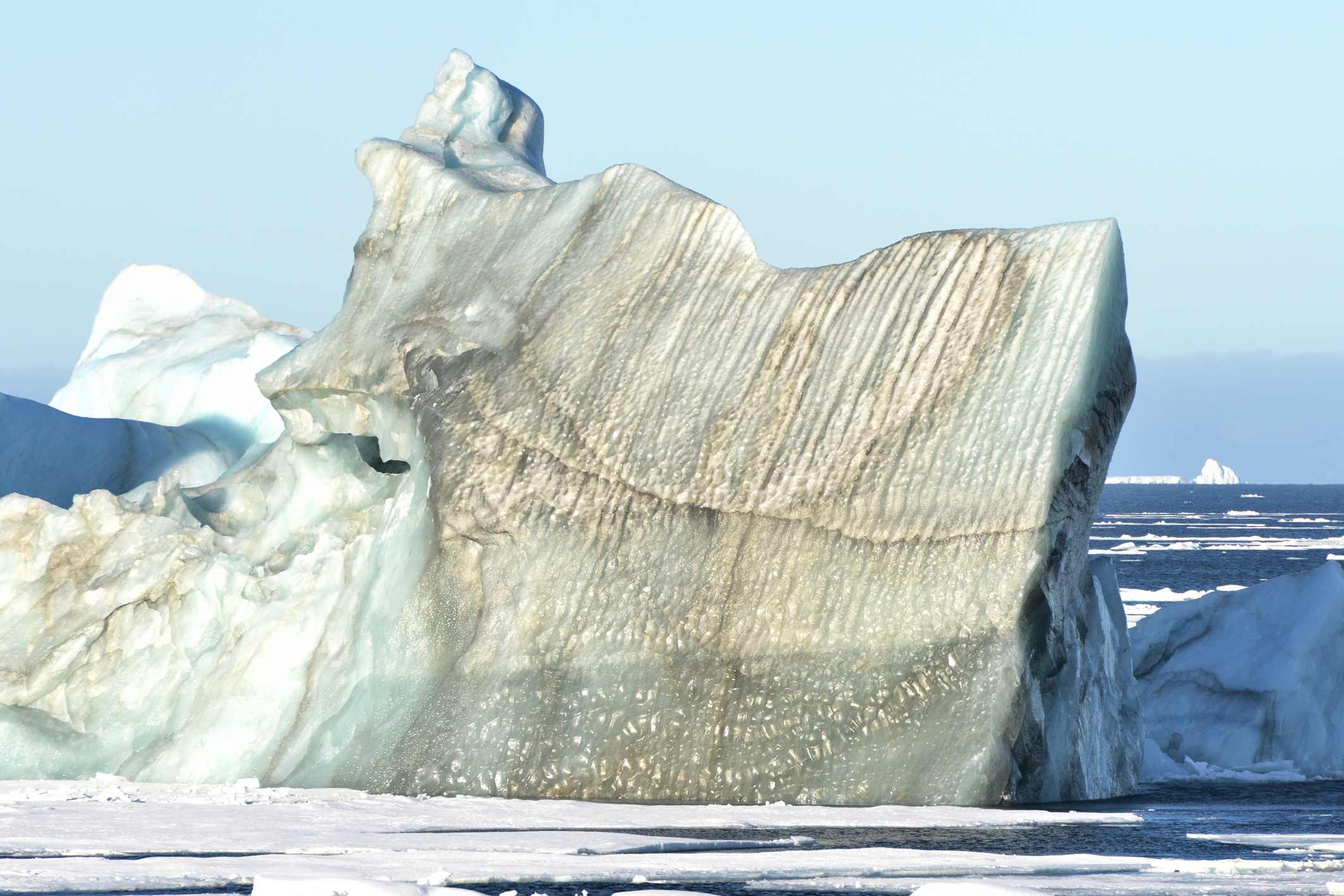

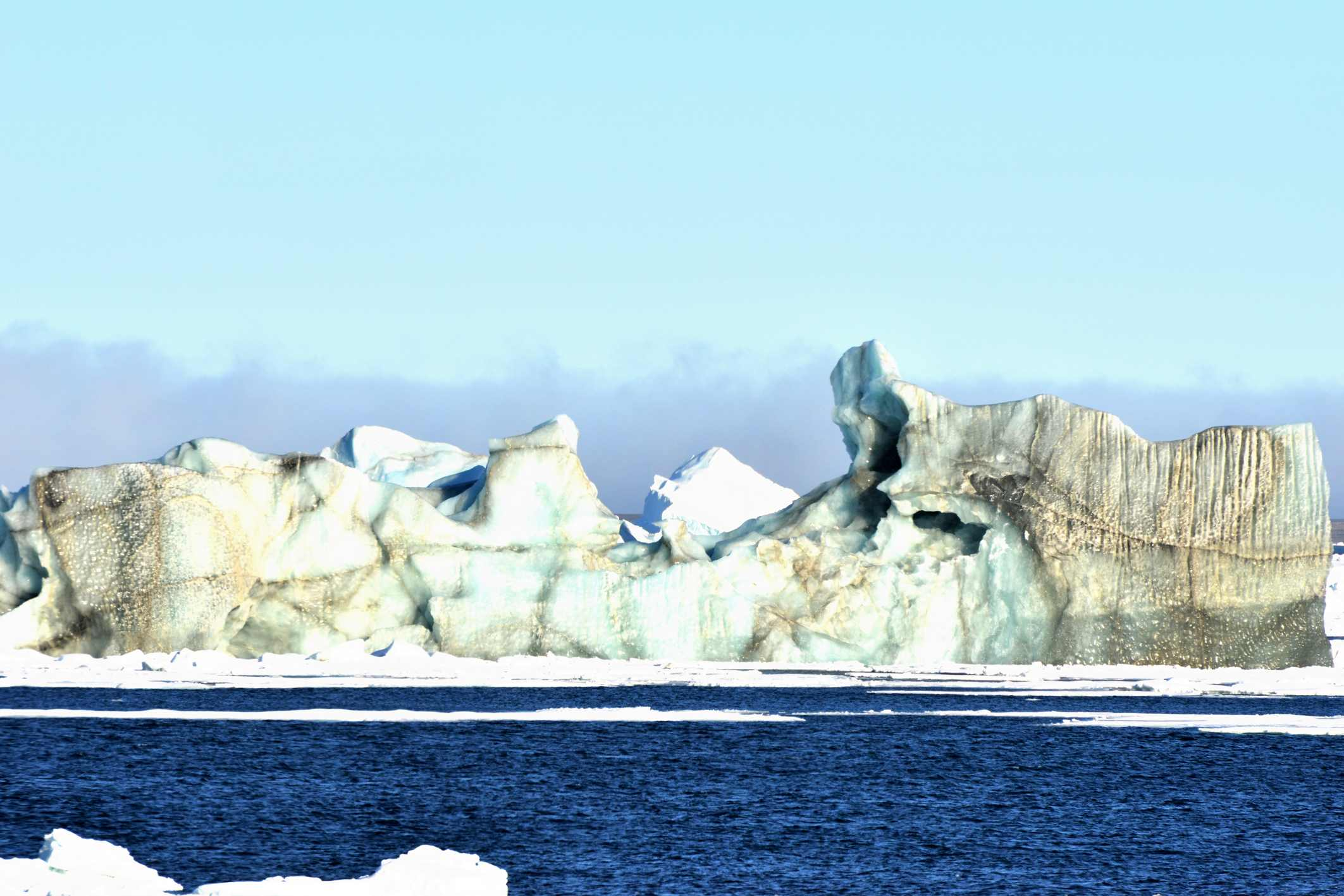

== Weather conditions ==
The weather on the island is extremely cold; the annual average temperature is −16 °C (3 °F).

== See also ==
- List of islands of Russia
- List of research stations in the Arctic
