= List of isthmuses =

This list of isthmuses is an appendix to the article isthmus. The list is sorted by the region of the world in which the isthmus is located. An isthmus ( /ˈɪsθməs/ or /ˈɪsməs/; plural: isthmuses, or occasionally isthmi; from Ancient Greek: ἰσθμός, romanized: isthmos, lit. 'neck') is a narrow piece of land connecting two larger areas across an expanse of water that otherwise separates them. A tombolo is an isthmus that consists of a spit or bar.

== Africa ==
=== Egypt ===
- Isthmus of Mansheya which developed around the man-made Heptastadion connecting the island of Pharos to mainland Alexandria.

== Americas ==
=== Argentina ===
- Istmo Carlos Ameghino, Province of Chubut
- Quetrihué Isthmus of Quetrihué Peninsula in Nahuel Huapi Lake

=== Brazil ===
- Isthmus at Nova Brasilia, Mel Island, Paraná

=== British Overseas Territories ===
- Isthmus of East Falkland

=== Canada ===
- Isthmus of Avalon
- Isthmus of Chignecto
- Meadow Portage Isthmus
- Niagara Peninsula
- Prince Edward County Isthmus
- Sechelt Isthmus

=== Central America ===
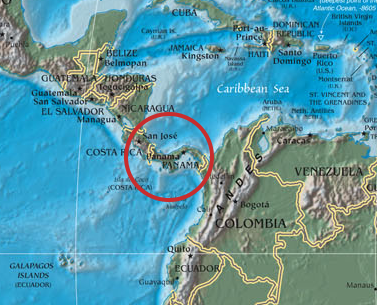
The Isthmus of Panama

- Costa Rica
- Isthmus of Panama
- Isthmus of Rivas, Nicaragua

=== Chile ===
- Isthmus of Brunswick Peninsula
- Isthmus of Muñoz Gamero Peninsula
- Ofqui Isthmus, Aisén Region

=== French Overseas Collectivity ===
- Isthmus of La Dune

=== Mexico ===
- Isthmus of Tehuantepec, Mexico

=== United States ===
- Isthmus of Catalina Island
- Madison Isthmus
- Seattle, Washington
- Point Peninsula, New York
- Maui, Hawai'i

=== Venezuela ===
- Médanos Isthmus – links mainland Venezuela to Paraguaná

== Asia ==
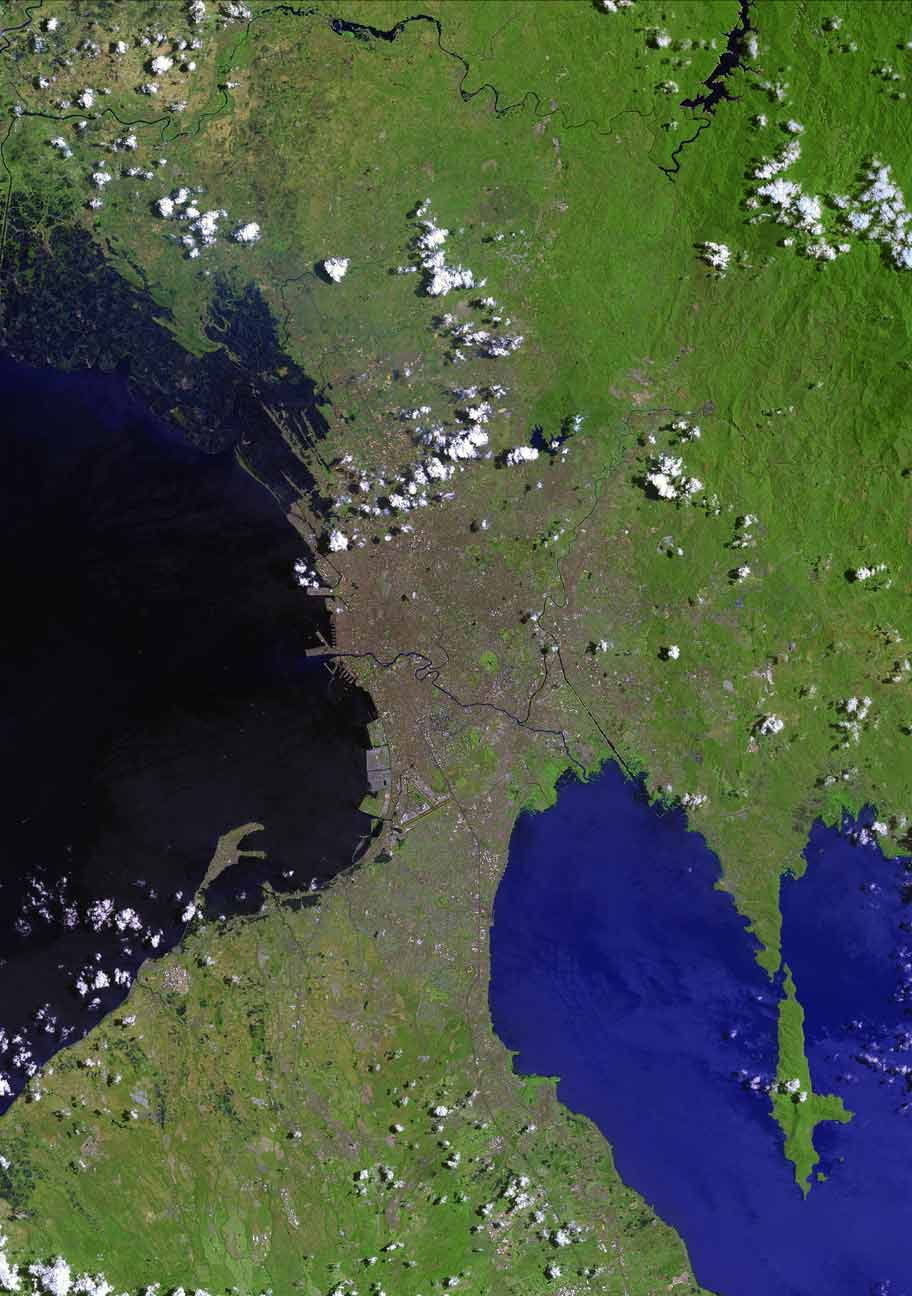
Metro Manila

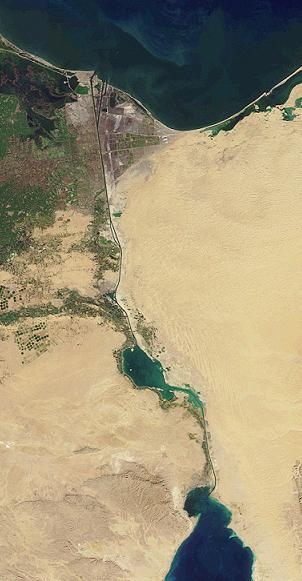
The Suez Canal goes across the western side of the Sinai Peninsula

- The Caucasus region connecting Europe to Asia between the Black Sea and Caspian Sea is sometimes considered an isthmus.
- The Isthmus of Kra connecting Malay Peninsula with the mainland of Asia located in southern Thailand.
- The Sinai Peninsula forms the Isthmus of Suez between the Mediterranean Sea and Red Sea and also forms the Asian border area towards Africa.
- The central area of Kushimoto town in the Wakayama prefecture of Japan is located on a narrow isthmus, surrounded on both sides by the Pacific Ocean.
- Metro Manila in the Philippines is situated on an isthmus.
- Tayabas Isthmus separates Bicol Region and Bondoc Peninsula from the rest of Luzon in the Philippines.
- Sorsogon City, Philippines is situated on an isthmus.
- The area around Jimbaran and the Denpasar airport connects the Nusa Dua peninsula with the main part of Bali in Indonesia.
- Isthmus of Korea between Sea of Japan and Yellow Sea.
- Mount Hakodate is connected to mainland Hakodate by an isthmus. The main part of the present urban area lies on the isthmus. The night view of the isthmus from Mount Hakodate is considered one of the best night views of Japan.
- Portas do Cerco, the northernmost part of Península de Macau, where the peninsula is connected to the rest of Hsiangshan Island.

== Europe ==
=== Black Sea ===
- Isthmus of Perekop between Crimea and mainland Europe

=== Estonia ===
Tallinn Isthmus between the Baltic Sea and Lake Ülemiste

=== Iceland ===
- Isthmus between Gilsfjörður and Bitrufjörður, which connects the Westfjords peninsula to the mainland of Iceland

=== Ireland ===
- Cape Clear Island
- Sutton, Dublin
- Belmullet, Mayo

=== Mediterranean Sea ===
- Isthmus of Catanzaro, which connects the toe of Italy to the rest of the Italian peninsula
- Isthmus of Corinth, which connects the Peloponnese peninsula to the rest of Greece
- Isthmus of Gibraltar
- Isthmus of Potidea, connecting the Kassandra peninsula with the mainland of Greece
- Isthmus of Ierapetra, which connects the eastern end of Crete to the rest of the island.
- Isthmus of Capo Testa, connecting Capo Testa peninsula (Santa Teresa Gallura), with the mainland of Sardinia

=== Russia ===
- Karelian Isthmus between Lake Ladoga and the Baltic Sea (Gulf of Finland)
- Poyasok Isthmus between Sea of Okhotsk and Sea of Japan
- Olonets Isthmus between Lake Onega and Lake Ladoga
- Onega Peninsula between Lake Onega and the White Sea (Onega Bay)
- Chivyrkuy Isthmus between Chivyrkuy Bay and Barguzin Bay of the Lake Baikal, connecting Svyatoy Nos Peninsula to the mainland
- Bolshoy Volok Isthmus between Malaya Volokovaya Bay and Motovsky Gulf, connecting Sredny Peninsula to the mainland
- Maly Volok Isthmus between Bolshaya Volokovaya Bay and Motovsky Gulf, connecting Rybachy Peninsula to Sredny Peninsula

=== United Kingdom and British islands ===
- The land bridge or isthmus connecting Britain and France in prehistoric times, often referred to in Early Modern literature
- La Coupée isthmus in Sark, Channel Islands
- Forth-Clyde isthmus in Scotland
- The isthmus connecting Langness Peninsula, Isle of Man, to the rest of the island
- Mavis Grind isthmus in Shetland
- The isthmus connecting the Isle of Portland to the mainland
- Rhins of Galloway isthmus in Wigtownshire (where Stranraer is situated), Scotland
- Tarbert is the name of several places at isthmuses in Scotland and Ireland. The translation from Old Irish is isthmus or portage-place ("across carry").
- The isthmus connecting Stornoway, Isle of Lewis in Scotland to the Eye Peninsula
- Hugh Town is located on an isthmus connecting the Hugh to the remainder of St Mary's, the largest of the Isles of Scilly
- Gugh, linked by a tombolo to St Agnes, both being inhabited islands of the Isles of Scilly

== Oceania ==
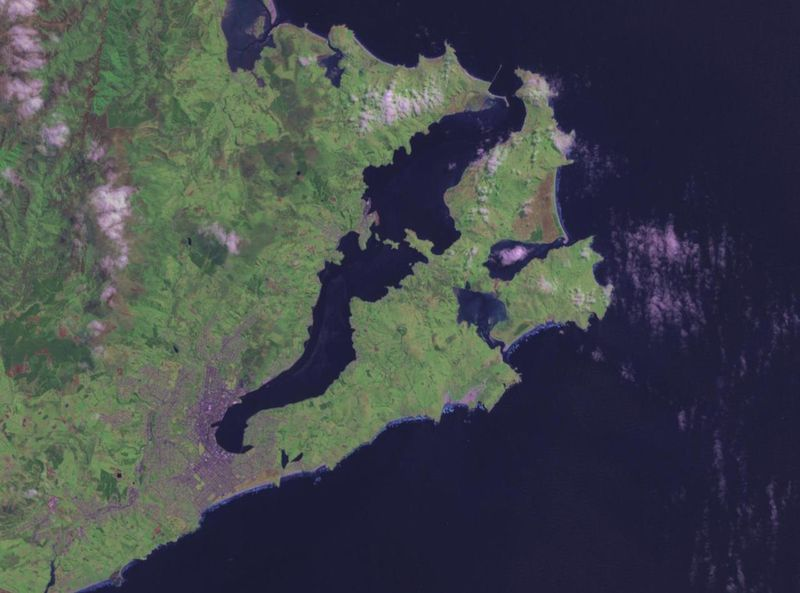
Otago Peninsula is joined to the New Zealand South Island mainland by an isthmus at South Dunedin.

=== Australia ===
- Eaglehawk Neck near Port Arthur, Tasmania
- Freycinet National Park, commonly referred to as Wineglass Bay, Tasmania
- The Neck in Bruny Island, Tasmania connecting North and South Bruny
- Maria Island, Tasmania
- Yanakie Isthmus, connects Wilsons Promontory to mainland Victoria
- Barrenjoey Headland, New South Wales...
- Tuross Head, New South Wales on the NSW South Coast.

=== New Zealand ===
- Auckland isthmus between Northland Peninsula and the rest of New Zealand's North Island
- Rongotai isthmus, location of Wellington International Airport
- "The Flat" of South Dunedin connects the Otago Peninsula to the South Island mainland
- The Neck is an inland isthmus between lakes Wanaka and Hawea
- The town of Mount Maunganui is situated on a tombolo isthmus connecting the volcanic cone of Mount Maunganui with the North Island mainland

== See also ==
- List of straits
