= Isthmian =

Isthmian is the adjective pertaining to an isthmus.

It may also refer to:

- Isthmian Games, one of the Panhellenic Games of Ancient Greece
- Isthmian League, a regional football league covering London and South East England
- Isthmian script, one of the Mesoamerican writing-systems
- Isthmian Steamship Company, a shipping company
- Isthmian Canal Commission, an American administration commission set up to oversee the construction of the Panama Canal

== See also ==
- Isthmia (disambiguation)
- Isthmus (disambiguation)
