= Krenkel =

Krenkel is a German surname of:

- Erich Krenkel (1880-1964), German geologist
- Ernst (Teodorovich) Krenkel (Russian: Эрнст Теодо́рович Кре́нкель, also German: Ernst Theodorowitsch Krenkel; 1903, Tartu –, Moscow), Baltic German Russian/Soviet Arctic explorer, and doctor of geographical sciences
- Roy Gerald Krenkel, "RGK" (1918, ? – 1983), American illustrator
- Werner A. Krenkel (1926–2015, Altmittweida, Saxony), German classical philologist
- Nate Krenkel (born 1973, ?), American Sony publishing executive

== Places ==
- Krenkel Bay, Severnaya Zemlya

== See also ==
- Heiss Island (also German: Hayes-Insel, Krenkel-Station), named after Ernst Krenkel
- Krankl
- Krengel
- Kringel (disambiguation)
