= Cape October =

Headland in Severnaya Zemlya, Russia

Cape October Мыс Октябрьский
- Cape
- Location of Cape October in Krasnoyarsk Krai
- Coordinates: 80°6′N 95°0′E
- Location: October Revolution Island, Severnaya Zemlya, Russia
- Offshore water bodies: Red Army Strait

Area
  - Total: Russian Far North

Cape October (Russian: Мыс Октябрьский; Mys Oktyabr’skiy) is a headland in Severnaya Zemlya, Russia.

== History ==
The cape was named during the 1930–1932 expedition to the archipelago led by Georgy Ushakov and Nikolay Urvantsev after the month of the 1917 Russian Revolution.

Thelodonti fossils from the Upper Silurian have been found in the area of the headland, as well as extinct marine mollusks of the Hiatellidae family.

== Geography ==
Cape October is located in a low-lying unglaciated area of the northern part of October Revolution Island north of the Albanov Glacier. It faces the Red Army Strait opposite the Academy of Sciences Glacier on Komsomolets Island shore. Visoky Island lies about 18 km (11 mi) east and Bolshoy Izvestnikovky Island about 13 km (8.1 mi) to the southwest of the cape, near the confluence with the Yuny Strait.

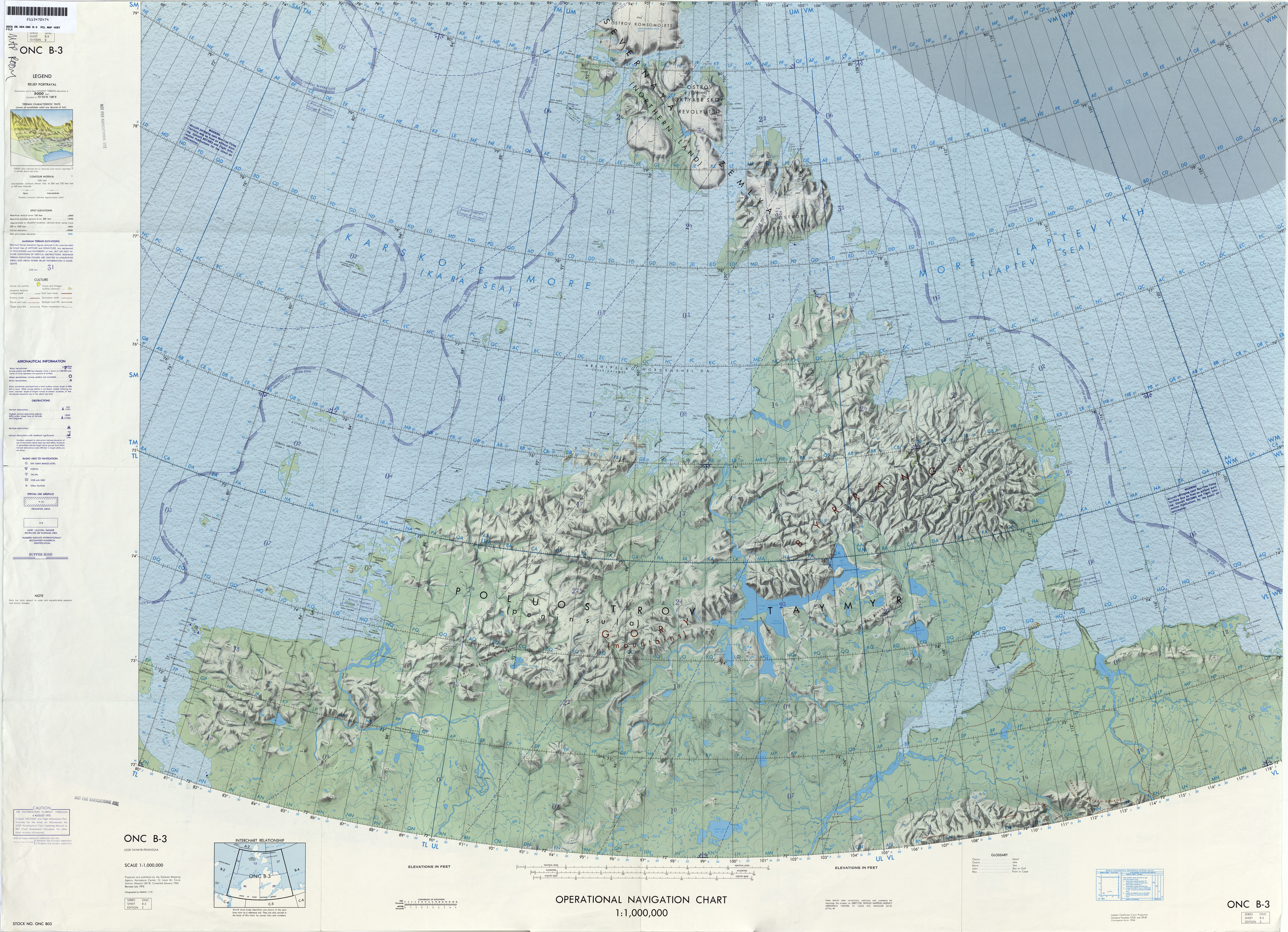
1975 map showing Severnaya Zemlya and the Taymyr Peninsula

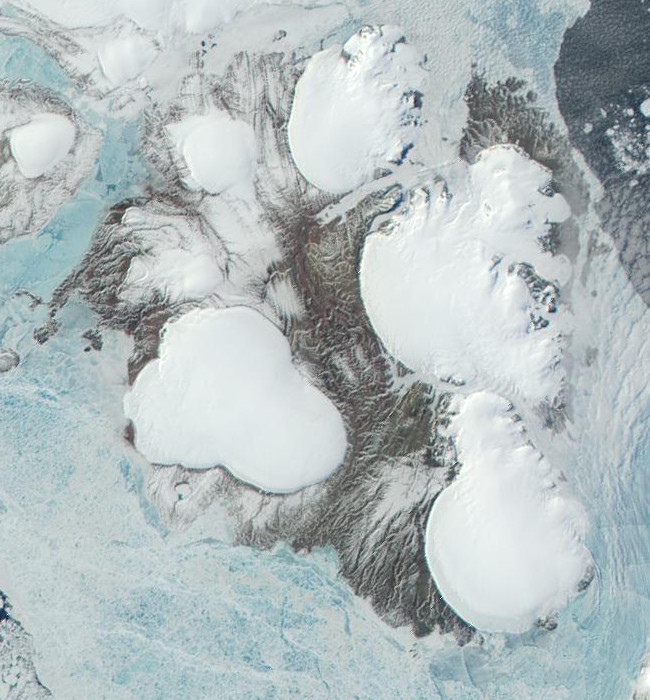
Satellite image of October Revolution Island

== See also ==
- List of research stations in the Arctic
