= Zhuravlev Bay =

Bay in Russia

- залив Журавлева (Russian)
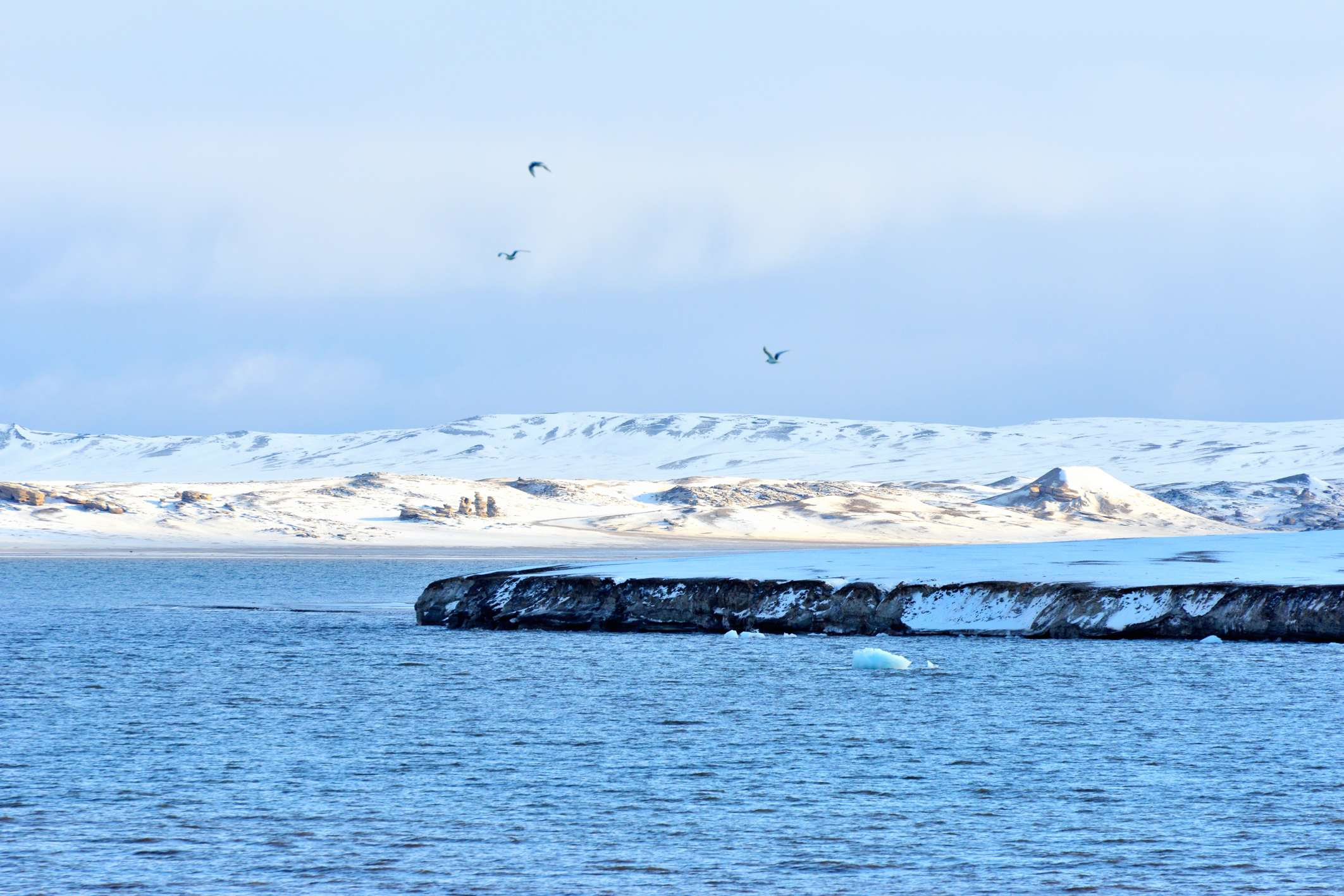
- View of the shore of Zhuravlev Bay

- Location in Krasnoyarsk Krai

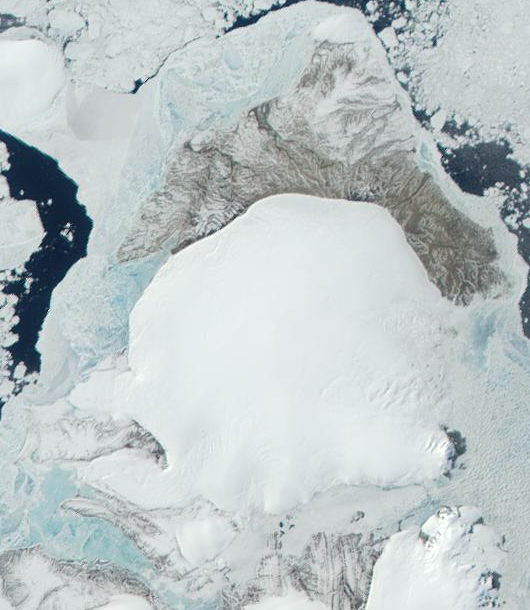
- Terra-MODIS image of Komsomolets island
- Location: Komsomolets Island, Severnaya Zemlya, Krasnoyarsk Krai
- Coordinates: 80°38′N 92°48′E
- Ocean/sea sources: Kara Sea
- Basin countries: Russia
- Max. length: 17 km (11 mi)
- Max. width: 10 km (6.2 mi)
- Islands: Shar Island

Zhuravlev Bay (Russian: залив Журавлева, Zaliv Zhuravleva) is a bay in Severnaya Zemlya, Krasnoyarsk Krai, Russia. This bay is blocked by ice most of the year.

== History ==
This bay was named by the 1930–1932 expedition to the archipelago led by Georgy Ushakov and Nikolay Urvantsev after Soviet Arctic explorer, invaluable member of the expedition and veteran surveyor Sergei Prokopyevich Zhuravlev (1892–1937).

== Geography ==
Zhuravlev Bay is a body of water in the northeastern area of Komsomolets Island, the northernmost island of Severnaya Zemlya.

The bay is open to the Kara Sea in the southwest. It has a maximum width at its mouth of about 10 km (6.2 mi), steadily narrowing towards the inner bay. The edge of the massive Academy of Sciences Glacier runs all along the eastern shore, while the northwestern shoreline is bound by a stretch of unglaciated area with Shar Island, 1 km (0.62 mi) in diameter, at the end of the headland.

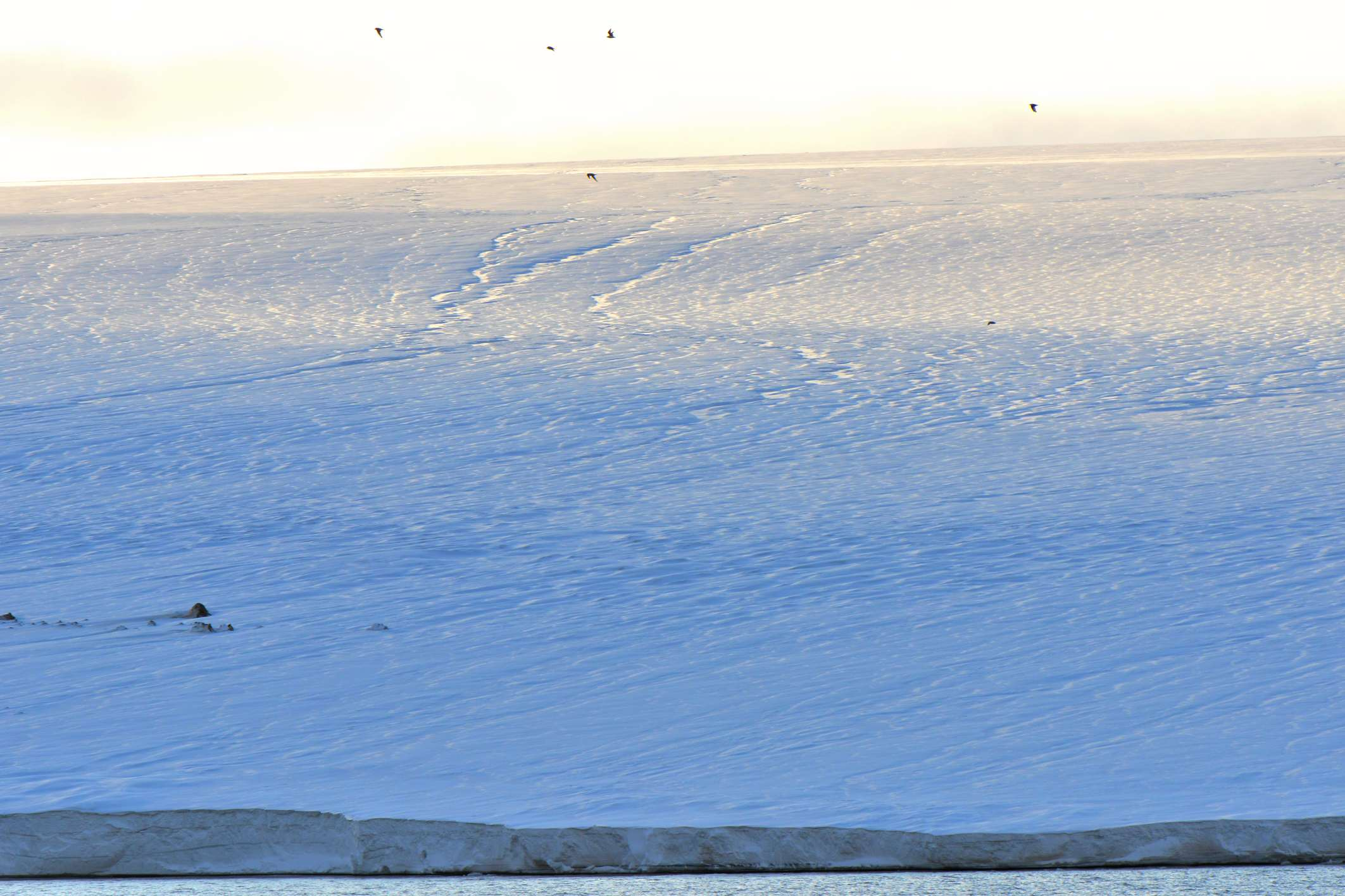
View of the eastern shore of Zhuravlev Bay with the enormous Academy of Sciences Glacier reaching the shore.

== See also ==
- List of fjords of Russia
