= Isthmus (disambiguation) =

An isthmus is a strip of land connecting two larger bodies of land.

Isthmus may also refer to:

- Isthmus (album), a 2022 album by Irish musician Seamus O'Muineachain
- Isthmus (Cos), an ancient town on the Greek island of Cos
- Isthmus (newspaper), a monthly newspaper in Madison, Wisconsin
- An anatomically narrow part of an organ; see List of anatomical isthmi
  - The visible medial third of the uterine tube is the isthmus of uterine tube or isthmus tubae uterinae
- An edge in a graph whose deletion increases the number of connected components of the graph; see Bridge (graph theory)
- A fictional banana republic in the James Bond film Licence to Kill

== See also ==
- List of isthmuses
