= Isthmus of Korea =

- Isthmus
- Location in North Korea
- Coordinates: 39°30′N 126°24′E

Dimensions
  - Width: 160 km
- Highest elevation: 1,833 m (Puktae-bong)

Isthmus of Korea is an area of the Korean Peninsula between Korea Bay and East Korea Bay (DPRK), where the peninsula narrows to 160 km. In the west and the east are low plains, while the central part has the wooded mountain range Puktae-bong, with elevations to 1,833 m.
