= Dolgaya Shchel =

Fjord in Kola Peninsula, Russia

- Долгая Щель (Russian)
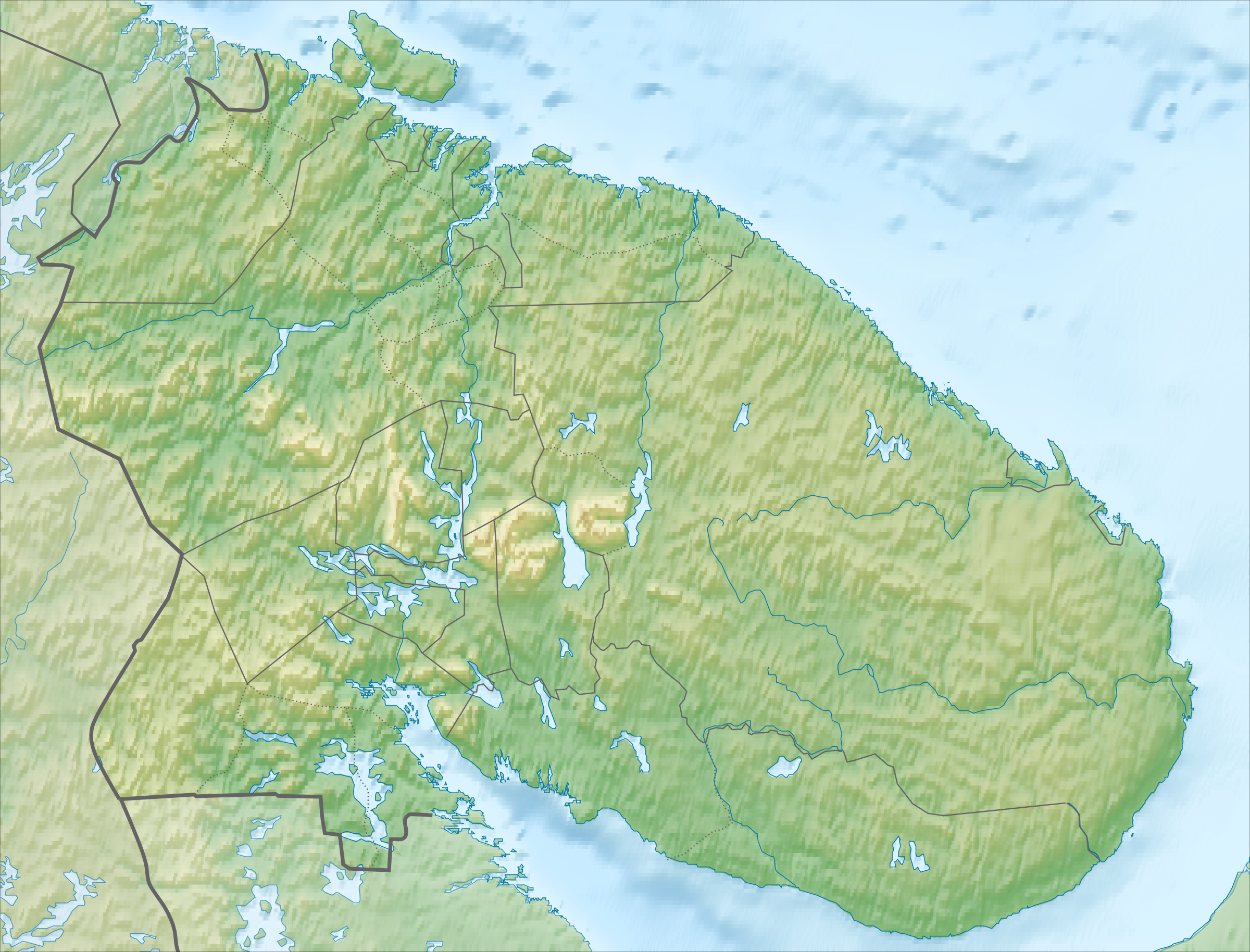
- Location
- Location: Far North
- Coordinates: 69°43′30″N 31°12′35″E
- Ocean/sea sources: Barents Sea
- Basin countries: Russia
- Max. length: 5 km (3.1 mi)
- Max. width: 0.6 km (0.37 mi)

Dolgaya Shchel (Russian: Долгая Щель) is a fjord on the northwestern coast of the Kola Peninsula, Murmansk Oblast, Russia.

== See also ==
- List of fjords of Russia
