= Yuny Strait =

Strait in Severnaya Zemlya, Russia

- Jungsturm Strait
- Юный пролив (Russian)
- Map showing the location of Yuny Strait

- Location in Krasnoyarsk Krai
- Location: Arctic
- Coordinates: 80°6′N 92°34′E
- Ocean/sea sources: Kara Sea / Red Army Strait
- Basin countries: Russia
- Max. length: 60 km (37 mi)
- Max. width: 24 km (15 mi)

Yuny Strait (Russian: Юный пролив) is a strait in Severnaya Zemlya, Russia. It is covered with ice most of the year.

== History ==
Initially named Proliv Yungshturm (Russian: пролив Юнгштурм) after the Roter Jungsturm of the German Communist Youth, following the Great Patriotic War, its name was changed to Yuny (Youth).

== Geography ==
The Yuny Strait is a maximum 24 km (15 mi)-wide strait that separates Pioneer Island from Komsomolets Island, connecting the Kara Sea in the northwest with the Red Army Strait in the southeast. It runs roughly in a northwest/southeast direction and its confluence with the Red Army Strait is located 23 km (14 mi) to the southwest of Cape October. The minimum width of Yuny Strait is 4 km (2.5 mi).

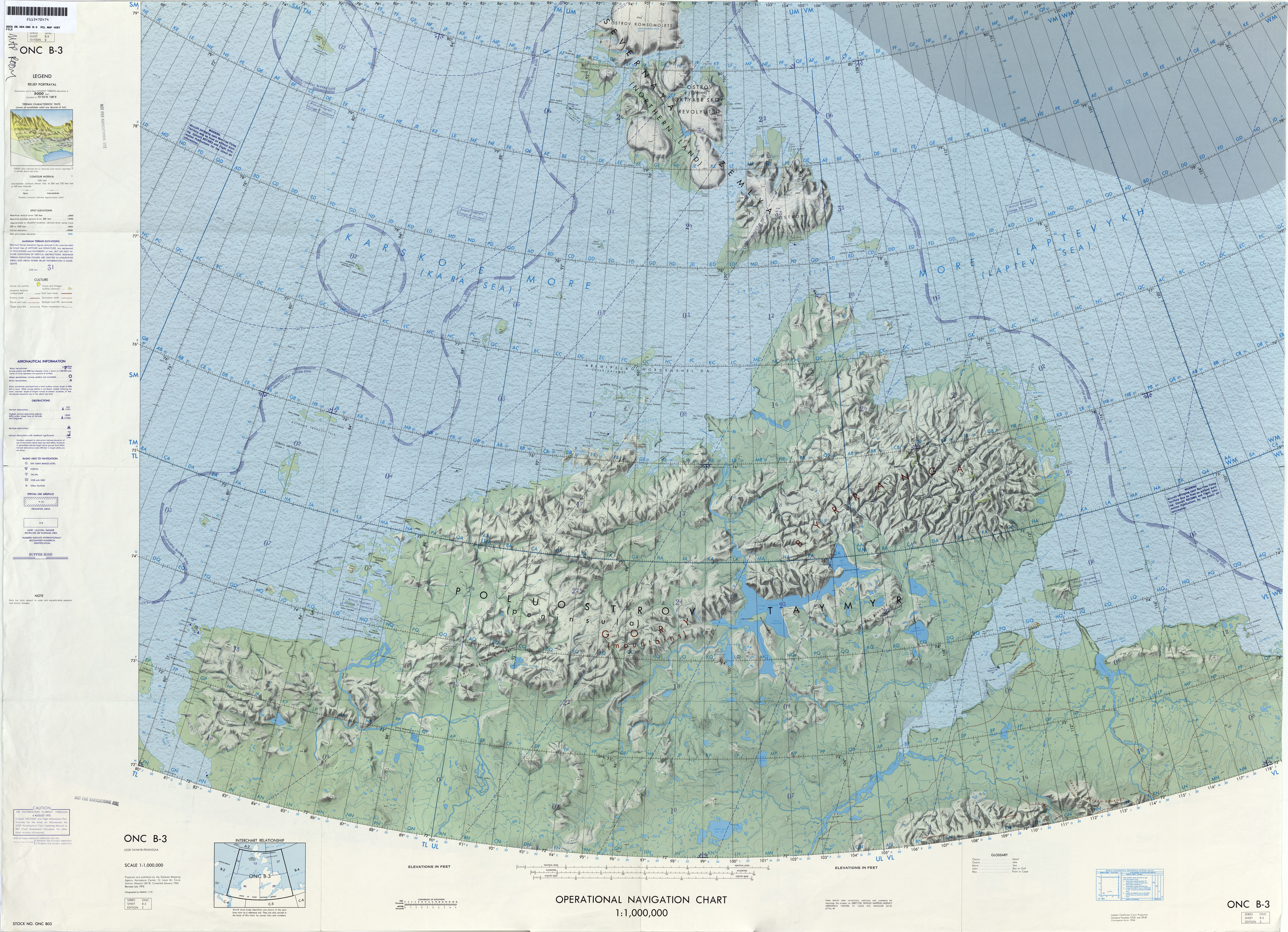
1975 map showing Severnaya Zemlya and the Taymyr Peninsula
