= Red Army Strait =

Strait in Severnaya Zemlya, Russia

- Пролив Красной Армии (Russian)
- Map showing the location of Red Army Strait

- Location in Krasnoyarsk Krai
- Location: Arctic
- Coordinates: 80°07′23″N 95°01′54″E
- Ocean/sea sources: Kara Sea / Laptev Sea
- Basin countries: Russia
- Max. width: 18 km (11 mi)

Red Army Strait (Russian: Пролив Красной Армии, Proliv Krasnoy Army) is a strait in Severnaya Zemlya, Russia. It is named after the Red Army (Krasnaya Armiya).

== Geography ==
The Red Army Strait is 18 kilometers (11 mi) wide. It separates Komsomolets Island in the north from October Revolution Island in the south and connects the Kara Sea in the west with the Laptev Sea in the east. The Yuny Strait, separating Pioneer Island from Komsomolets Island, branches to the northwest in the eastern part of the strait.

The huge Academy of Sciences Glacier reaches the shore all along the northern side of the strait, while the smaller Rusanov Glacier flanks the eastern part of its southern shore. Cape October is located in the northern shore of October Revolution Island, facing the Red Army Strait. Visoky Island lies about 18 km (11 mi) east and Bolshoy Izvestnikovky Island lies about 13 km (8.1 mi) to the southwest of the cape.

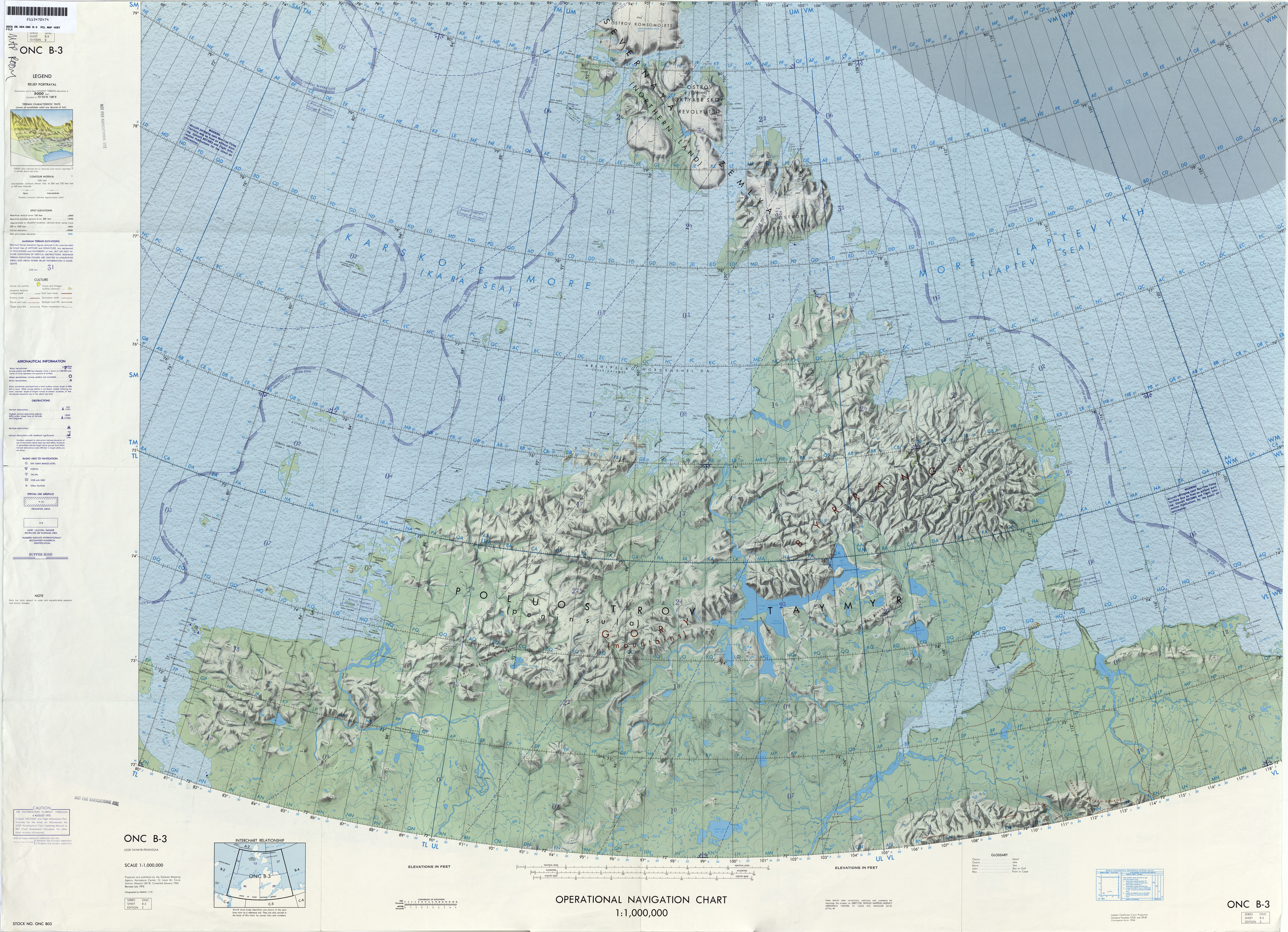
1975 map showing Severnaya Zemlya and the Taymyr Peninsula
