= Voryema Bay =

Bay of the Barents Sea, Russia and Norway

Coordinates: 69°46′55″N 30°49′39″E

Voryema Bay (Russian: Губа Ворьема, Norwegian: Finnbukta) is a fjord on the northwestern coast of the Kola Peninsula, on the border between Murmansk Oblast (Russia) and Norway. The Jakobselva (Russian: Voryema) river has its mouth in the bay.

== See also ==
- List of fjords of Russia
