= Kislaya Guba =

Fjord on the Kola Peninsula near Murmansk, Russia

Coordinates: 69°22′34″N 33°04′33″E

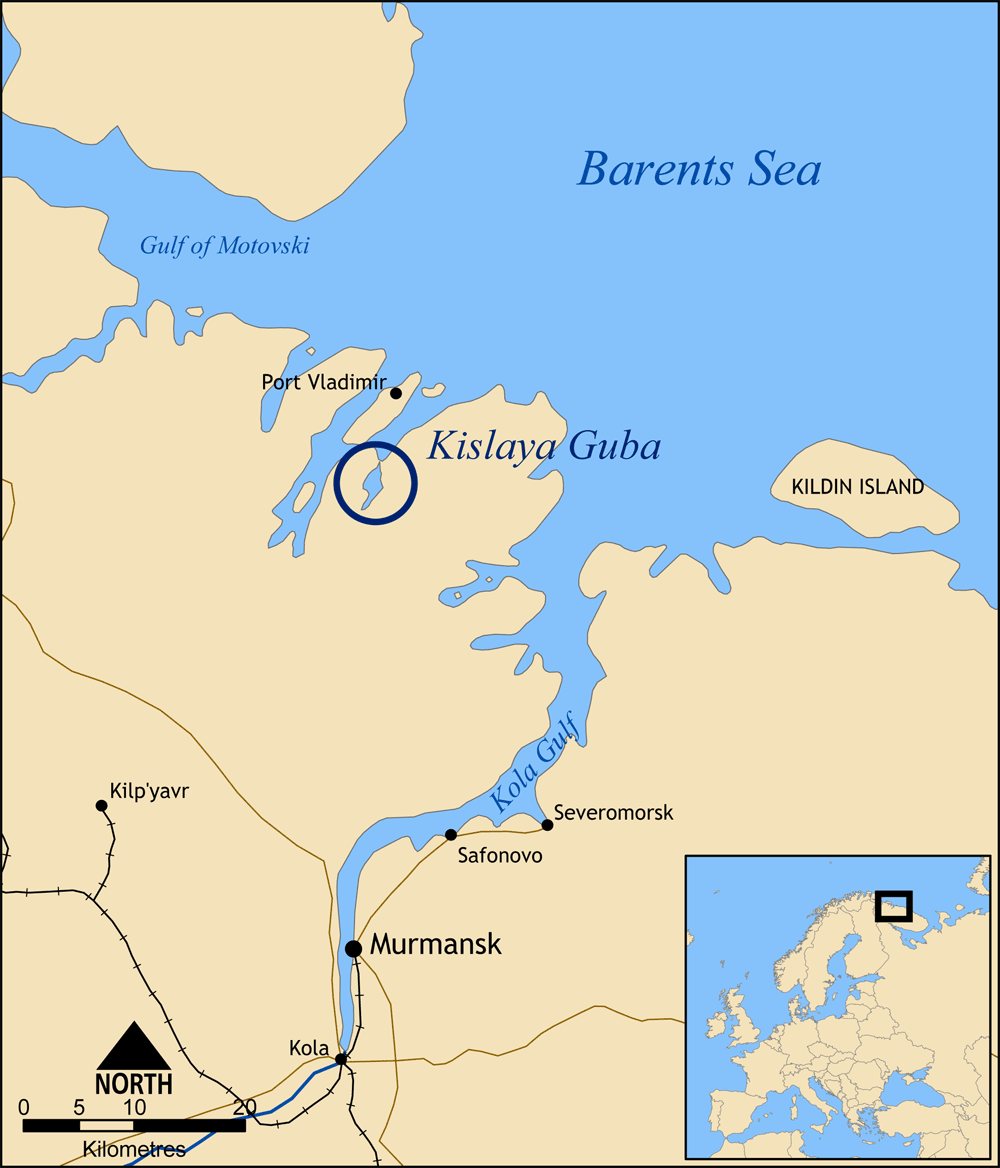
Kislaya Guba map

Kislaya Guba (meaning sour bay in Russian) is a fjord on the Kola Peninsula near Murmansk, Russia. The fjord is connected to the Barents Sea to the north and is primarily known as the site of the experimental tidal power project, Kislaya Guba Tidal Power Station.

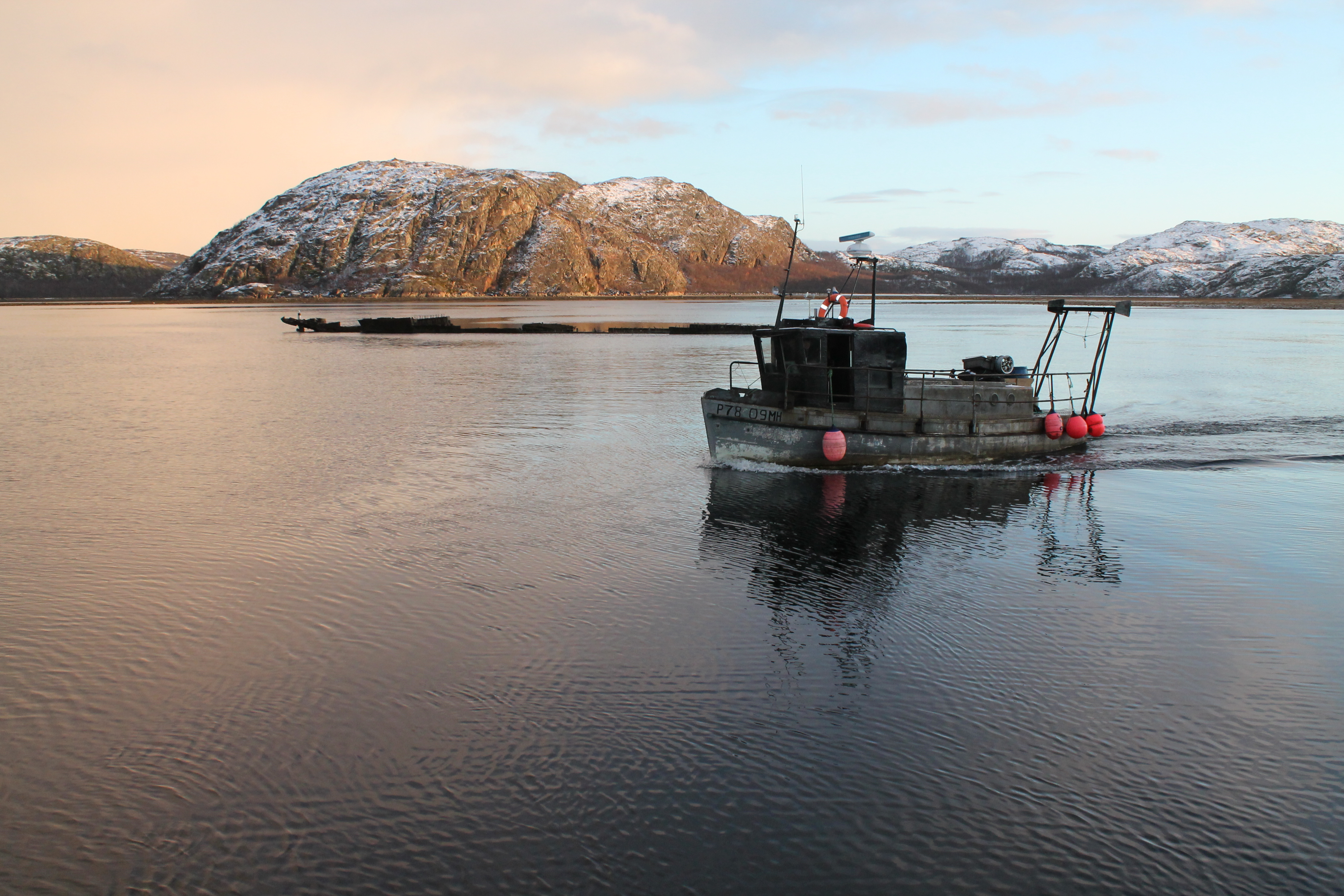
Kislaya Guba

== See also ==
- List of fjords of Russia
