= Krenkel Bay =

Bight in Russia

- Бухта Кренкеля
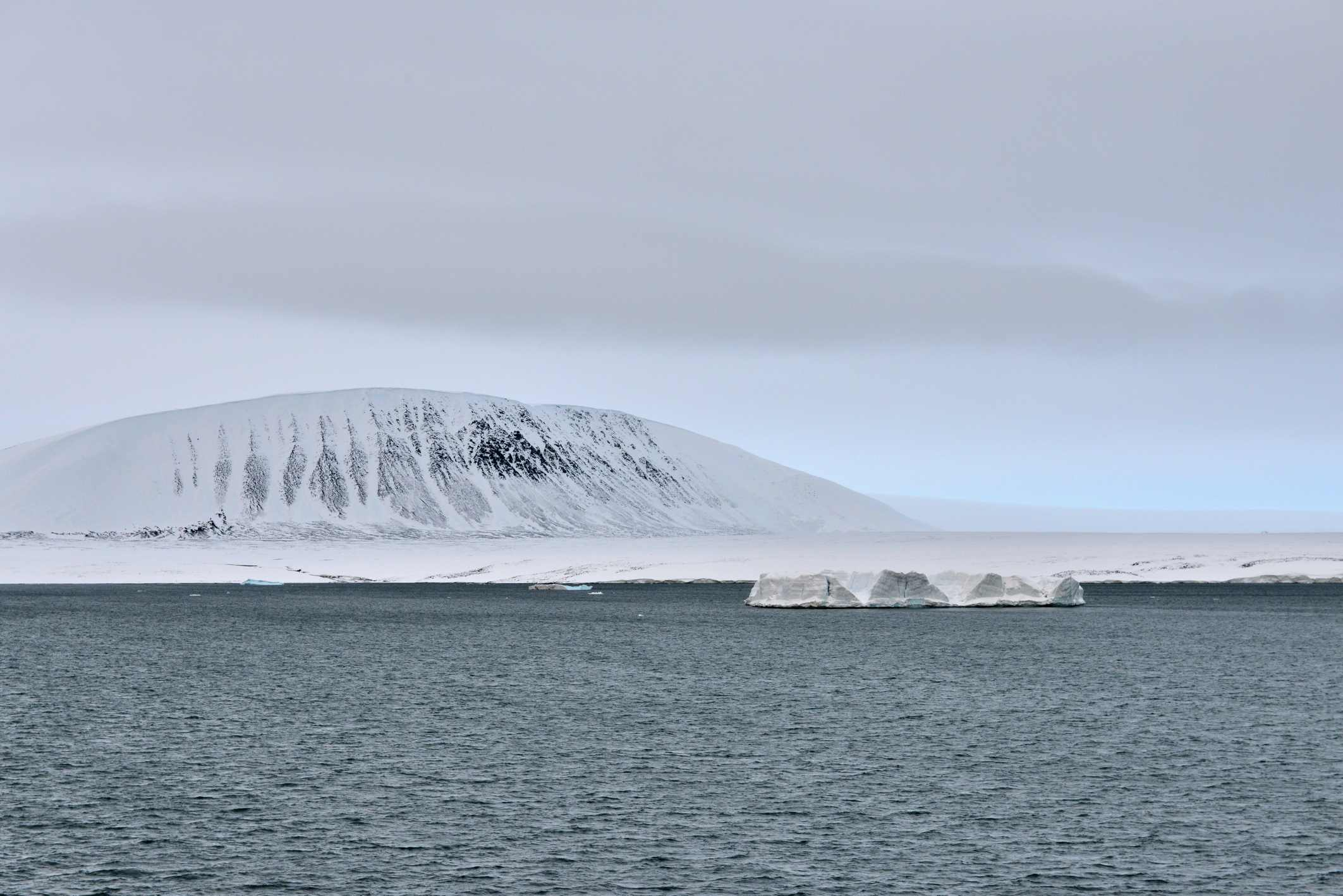
- View of the shore of Krenkel Bay

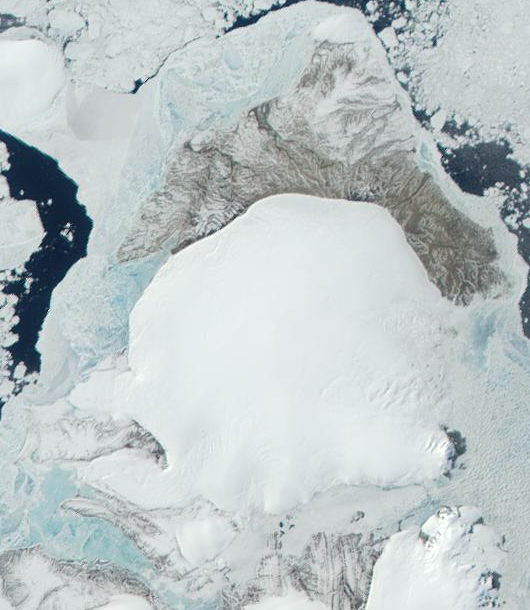
- Landsat image of Komsomolets island

- Location in Krasnoyarsk Krai
- Location: Komsomolets Island, Severnaya Zemlya, Krasnoyarsk Krai
- Coordinates: 80°30′N 97°50′E
- Ocean/sea sources: Laptev Sea
- Basin countries: Russia
- Max. length: 11 km (6.8 mi)
- Max. width: 25 km (16 mi)
- Islands: Ozerny Island

Krenkel Bay (Russian: Бухта Кренкеля, romanized: Bukhta Krenkelya) is a bay in Severnaya Zemlya, Krasnoyarsk Krai, Russia.

== History ==
This bay was discovered by the 1930–1932 expedition to the archipelago led by Georgy Ushakov and Nikolay Urvantsev. Decades later, in 1973, this bay was named after Soviet Arctic explorer and radio operator Ernst Krenkel (1903–1971).

== Geography ==
Krenkel Bay is a body of water in the northeastern area of Komsomolets Island, the northernmost island of Severnaya Zemlya.

The bay is open to the southeast. It is regular in shape and has a width of about 25 km (16 mi). The edge of the massive Academy of Sciences Glacier runs all along the western shore, while the northern shoreline is bound by a stretch of unglaciated area. Ozerny Island lies close to the northeastern headland of the bay.

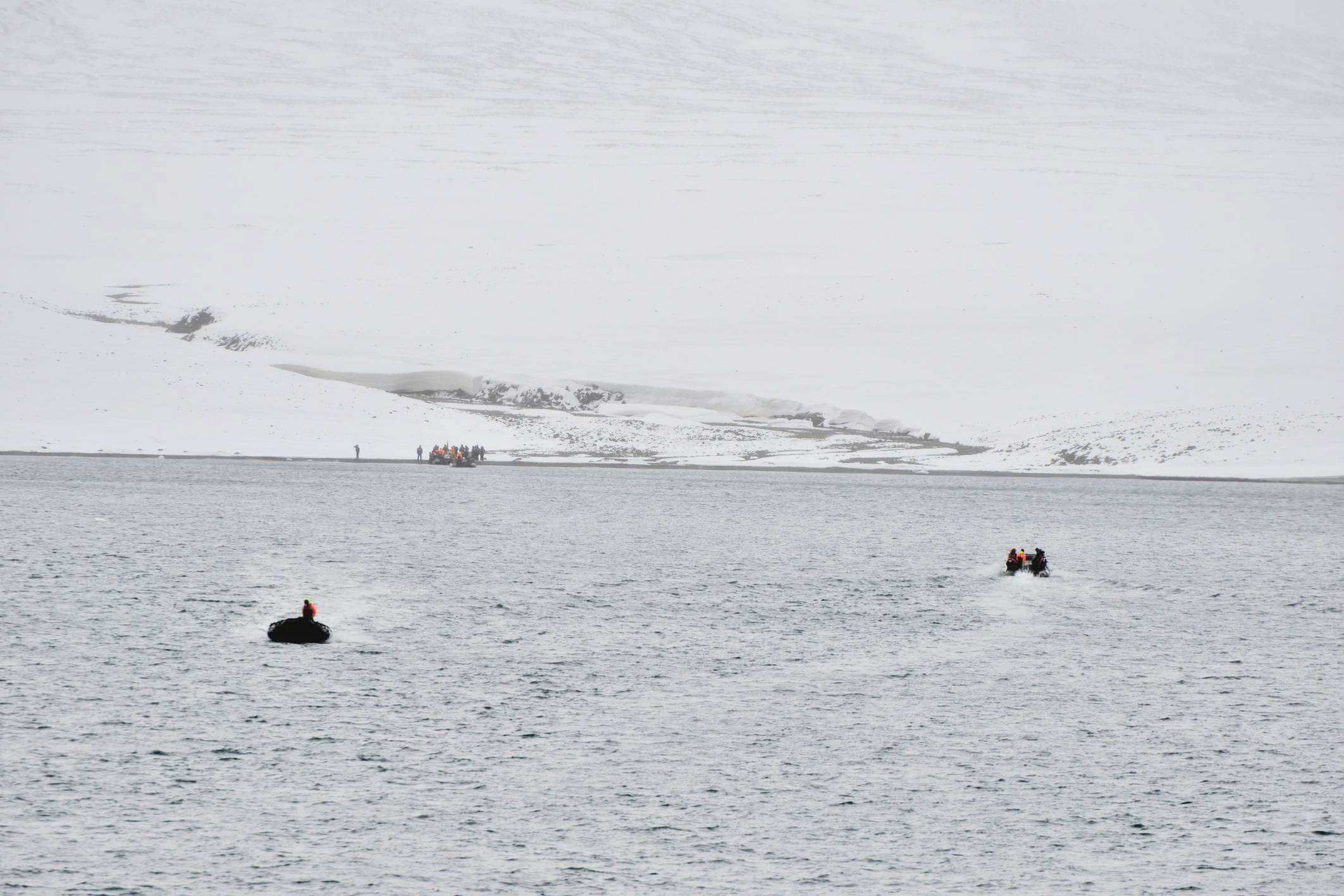
Another view of Krenkel Bay

== See also ==
- List of fjords of Russia
