= Lake Lednikovoye (Novaya Zemlya) =

Lake in Arkhangelsk Oblast, Russia

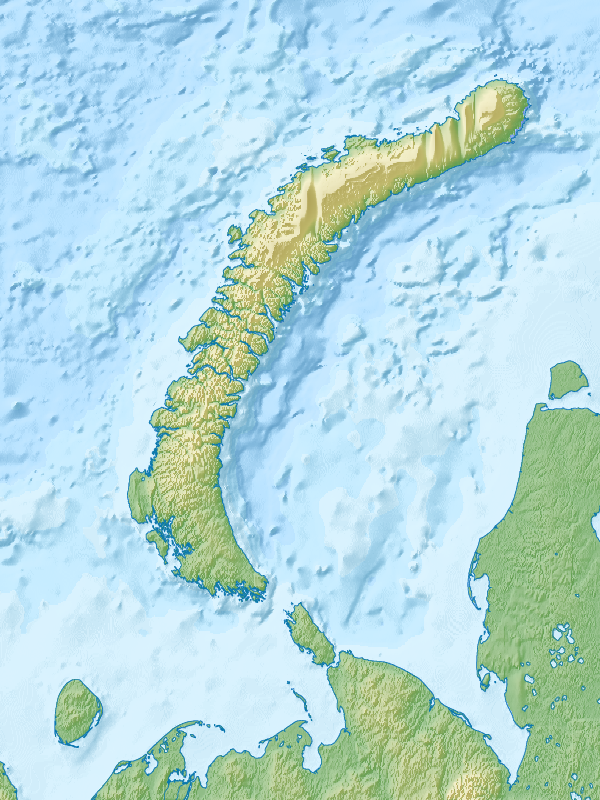
- Location within Novaya Zemlya
- Location: Arctic Ocean, Novaya Zemlya, Arkhangelsk Oblast, Russia
- Coordinates: 74°24′30″N 56°48′02″E
- Type: Glacial
- Catchment area: 740 km^{2} (290 sq mi)
- Basin countries: Russia
- Max. length: 29.5 km (18.3 mi)
- Max. width: 4.5 km (2.8 mi)
- Surface area: 1978 y:48.9 km^{2} (18.9 sq mi); 2024 y:71 km^{2} (27 sq mi)
- Surface elevation: 3 m (9.8 ft)
- Frozen: late September until July
- Islands: ≈5
- Settlements: none

Lednikovoye (/ˌlɛdnikoʊvoʊjɛ/, Russian: Леднико́вое, IPA: [ˈlʲɪdnikovojʲɪ], lit. 'Glacial') is a proglacial lake on the Northern Island of Novaya Zemlya, administratively belongs to the Arkhangelsk region of Russia.

The lake is of glacial origin, formed by water damming by ridges of terminal moraines of glaciers after their retreat. The length of the reservoir exceeds 29 km (18 mi), the area of the drainage basin is 740 km^{2} (290 sq mi). The lake is located on a lowland stretching in the latitudinal direction from the Severnaya Sulmeneva Bay of the western shore to the glacier in the central part of the island.

According to official data, the surface area of the lake is 48.9 km^{2} (18.9 sq mi), but since the outlet tongues of five glaciers flow into the lake, its area varies significantly depending on the stretch of these glaciers into the lake. Due to modern climate warming, over the period from 1999 to 2016, the boundaries of the glaciers in the lake retreated by more than a mile, thereby significantly increasing its area. As a result of the retreat of glaciers, a chain of new islands was formed in the lake in its western part. Its area exceeded the area of Lake Goltsovoye (another big lake of the island) and, thus, Lednikovoye became the largest inland reservoir of the Novaya Zemlya archipelago. In addition to the five glaciers that flow directly into the lake, about a dozen more glaciers descend to it, but do not reach the water.

== See also ==
- List of fjords of Russia
