= Kringel =

Kringel may refer to:

- Kringle, spelled Kringel in German, a Scandinavian variety of pretzel
- Chris Kringel, American bass guitarist and musical author
- Secret Santa, also known as Kris Kringel in Ireland, a Western Christmas or Saint Nicholas tradition of gift giving
- Kringel, a blast crater caused by Operation Big Bang (1947)
