= Malaya Volokovaya =

Bay of the Barents Sea, Russia

Coordinates: 69°40′30″N 31°44′33″E

- Малая Волоковая
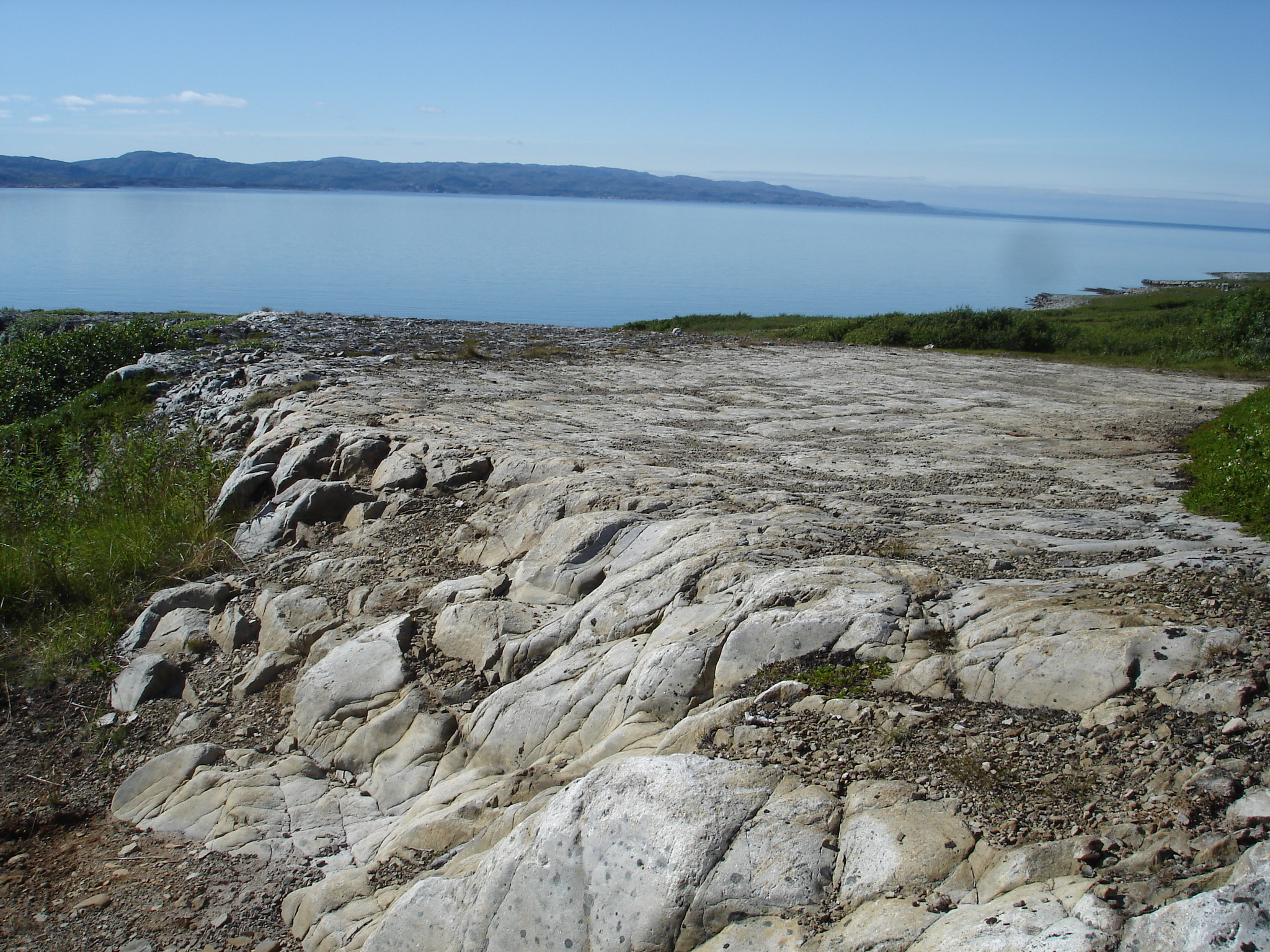
- View of Malaya Volokova Bay.
- Interactive map of Malaya Volokovaya
- Location: Murmansk Oblast, Russia
- Type: Fjord
- Primary outflows: Barents Sea
- Basin countries: Russia
- Surface elevation: 0 m (0 ft)

Malaya Volokovaya (Russian: Малая Волоковая) is a fjord on the northwestern coast of the Kola Peninsula, Murmansk Oblast, Russia.

== See also ==
- List of fjords of Russia
