= Bolshaya Volokovaya =

Bay of the Barents Sea

Coordinates: 69°50′00″N 31°59′00″E

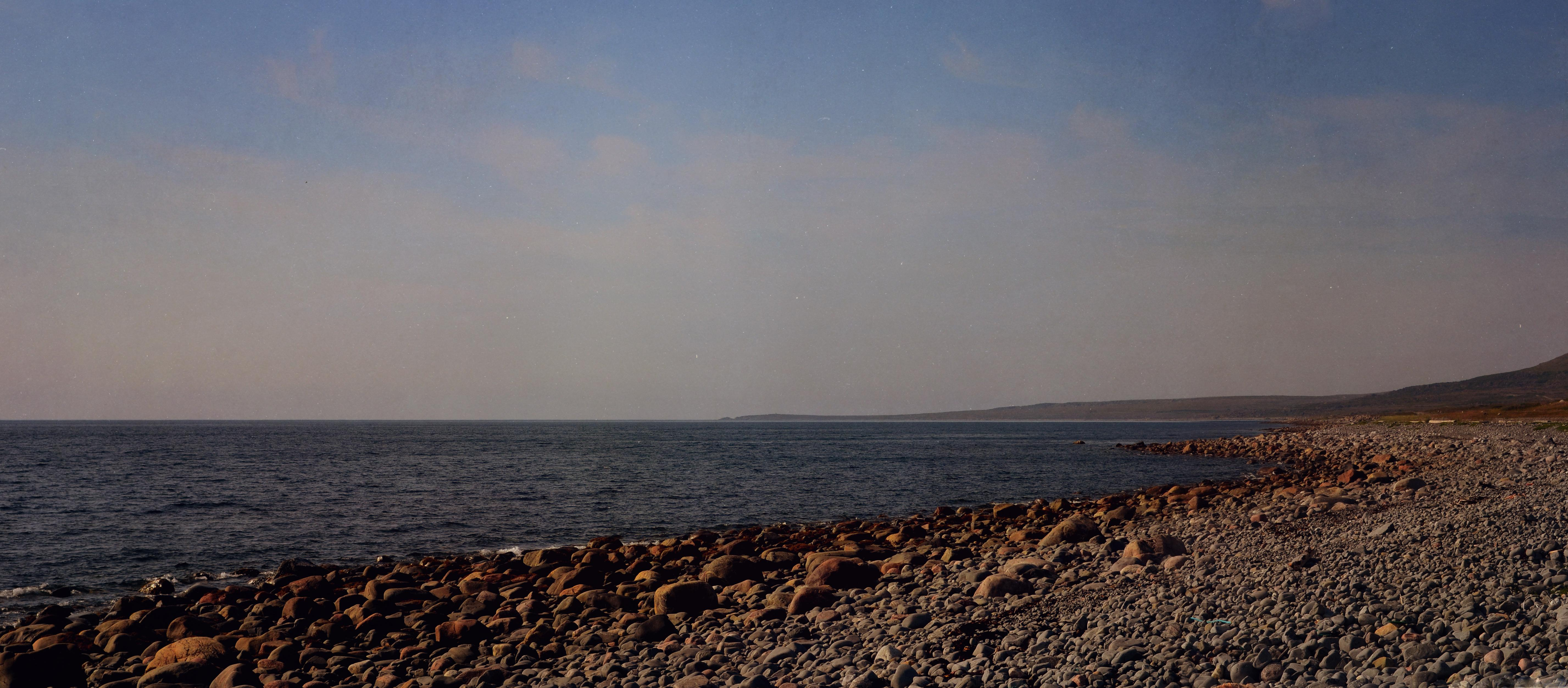
Bolshaya Volokovaya

Bolshaya Volokovaya (Russian: Большая Волоковая) is a fjord on the northwestern coast of the Kola Peninsula, Murmansk Oblast, Russia.

== See also ==
- List of fjords of Russia
