= Isthmus of Catanzaro =

Narrowest part of the Italian Peninsula

Coordinates: 38.7830°N 16.3830°E

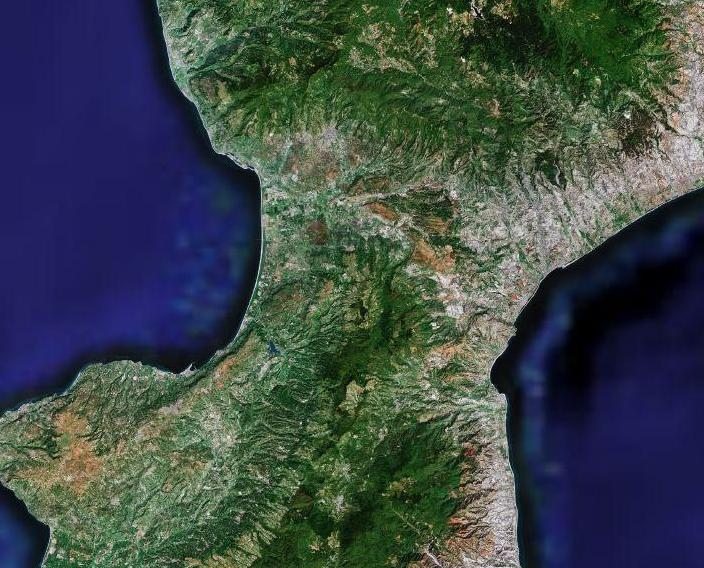
Satellite view of the isthmus.

The Isthmus of Catanzaro (or Isthmus of Marcellinara, also called Saddle of Catanzaro or Saddle of Marcellinara due to its morphology) is a narrow strip of land separating the Ionian Sea from the Tyrrhenian Sea, in Calabria. It is the narrowest section of the Italian Peninsula.

== Description ==
The Isthmus is approximately 30 kilometres wide and is situated in the lowlands between the south end of the Sila mountainous plateau and the northern part of the Calabrian Serre. The valley between the two mountain ranges is approximately 2 kilometres wide in its narrowest point, and it opens wide to form the Piana di Sant'Eufemia on the west side, and the valley of Corace to the east, reaching the seas at both sides. South of Marcellinara is the Sella di Marcellinara (Saddle of Marcellinara), the lowest and narrowest point of the Calabrian Apennine, at a height of about 250 metres. From the high grounds of the Calabrian Apennine, in the towns of Tiriolo, Marcellinara and Catanzaro, it is possible to have a panoramic view of the Ionian and Tyrrhenian Seas at the same time. The isthmus is crossed by two seasonal rivers: the Amato and the Corace. Both have their springs from the Plateau of Sila and, after running parallel, separated by about two kilometres, they separate near the hills of Gimigliano. The Amato descends the valley westwards, ending its run in Tyrrhenian Sea, whereas the Corace goes eastwards to the Ionian Sea.

== History ==
According to classical accounts, during the slave rebellion led by Spartacus, general Marcus Licinius Crassus decided to fortify the Isthmus by mean of a wall, in order to block their offensive and cut supplies.

The name of Italy comes from the name of the tribe that inhabited the isthmus at the time of the Ancient Greek colonisation of Italy.

During the Fascist era of the early 20th century, the construction of a channel to connect the Ionian to the Tyrrhenian has been advanced several times.
