= Isthmus of Potidea =

Connects the Kassandra peninsula to the Greek mainland

The Isthmus of Potidea created in 1937, connects the Kassandra peninsula with the mainland of Greece. The city of Potidaea was dug through the sandy soil at the narrowest part of the isthmus, perhaps with the aim of making the city a naval base.
