= Academy of Sciences Glacier =

Ice cap on Komsomolets Island, Severnaya Zemlya, Russia

- ледник Академии наук
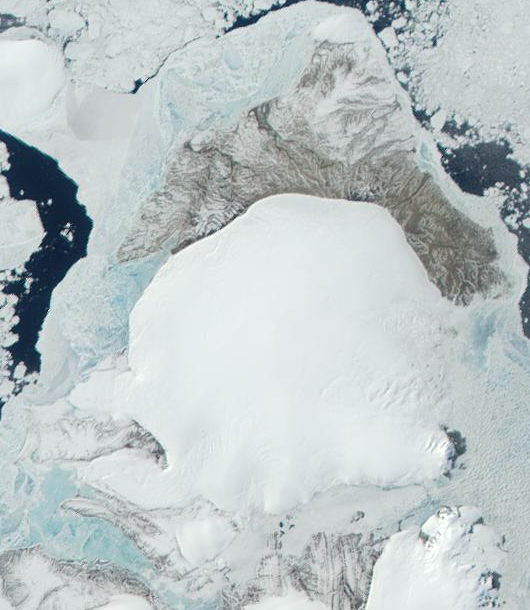
- Terra-MODIS image of Komsomolets Island with the massive Academy of Sciences Glacier covering two thirds of the island

- Location within Krasnoyarsk Krai
- Interactive map of Academy of Sciences Glacier
- Type: Ice cap
- Location: Komsomolets Island, Severnaya Zemlya; Krasnoyarsk Krai, Russia
- Coordinates: 80°24′N 94°50′E
- Area: 5,570 km^{2} (2,150 sq mi)
- Thickness: 500 m (1,600 ft)

The Academy of Sciences Glacier (Russian: ледник Академии наук; Lednik Akademii Nauk) is a large ice cap on Komsomolets Island, Severnaya Zemlya, Russian Federation.

It is the largest in Severnaya Zemlya and is also the largest single glacier formation of Russia.

== History ==
This glacier was named after the Soviet Academy of Sciences by the 1930–1932 expedition to the archipelago led by Georgy Ushakov and Nikolay Urvantsev.

A 724-metre-long (2,375 ft) long ice core was drilled between 1999 and 2001 from a drilling site located near the summit of the Academy of Sciences Glacier.

== Geography ==
The Academy of Sciences Glacier is roughly circular in shape with a diameter of about 80 km (50 mi) and an area of 5,570 km^{2} (2,150 sq mi). It covers almost two thirds of Komsomolets island, except for an unglaciated area at the northern end. Its average height is 692 m (2,270 ft) with a maximum elevation of 749 m (2,457 ft).

This vast ice cap is located on the southern side of the island, stretching from coast to coast, with the Laptev Sea on its eastern side at Krenkel Bay, the Red Army Strait in the south, and the Kara Sea on the west at Zhuravlev Bay.

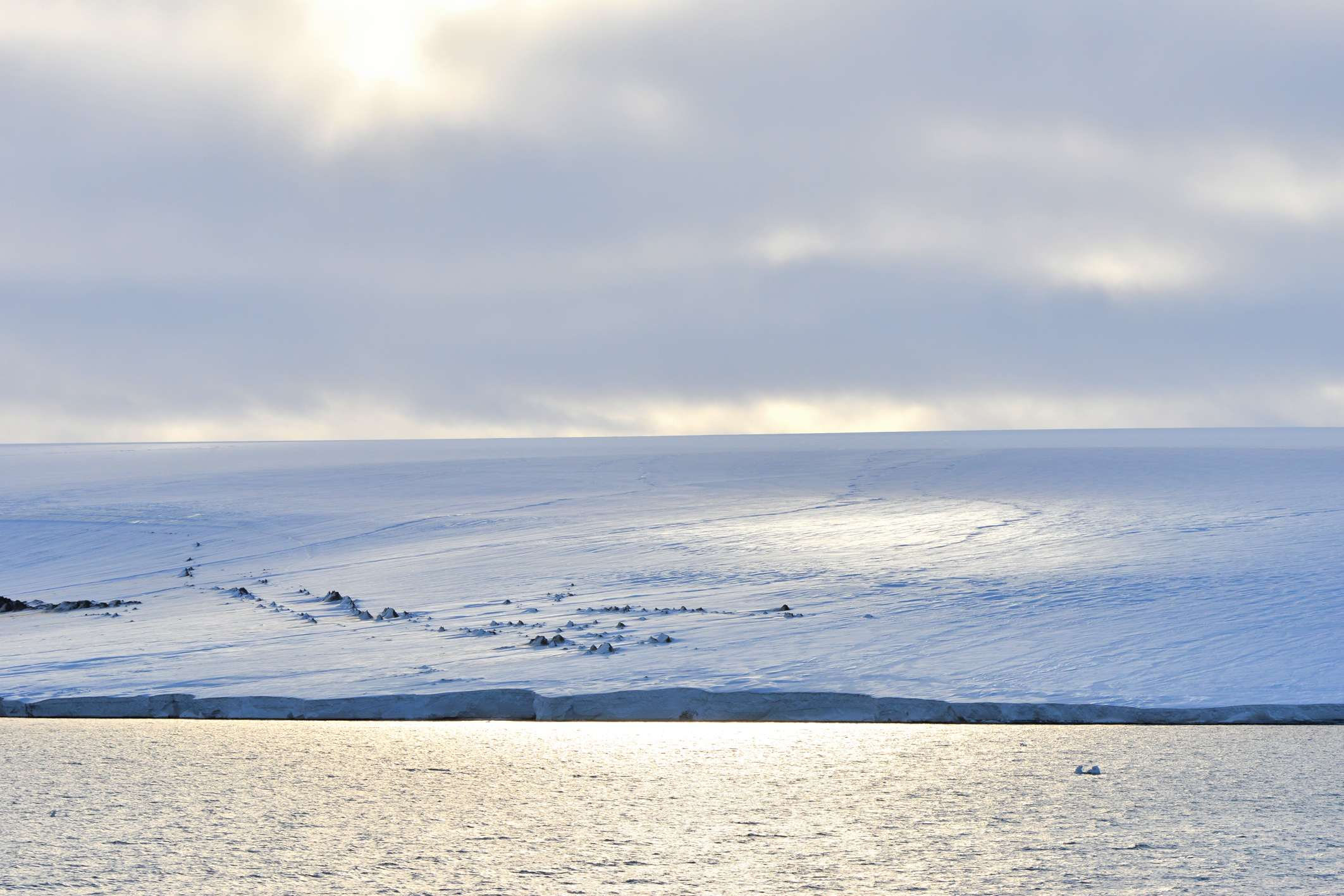
View of the Academy of Sciences Glacier from Zhuravlev Bay

== In popular culture ==
The Academy of Sciences Glacier is portrayed in the 2021 film The Tomorrow War as the site at which a group attempts to prevent the escape of aliens from a ship, 28 years before they do, without detection and spread across the planet.

== See also ==
- List of glaciers in Russia
- Ice drilling
