= Komsomolets Island =

Island of the Severnaya Zemlya group in the Russian Arctic

Komsomolets
Native name: остров Комсомолец
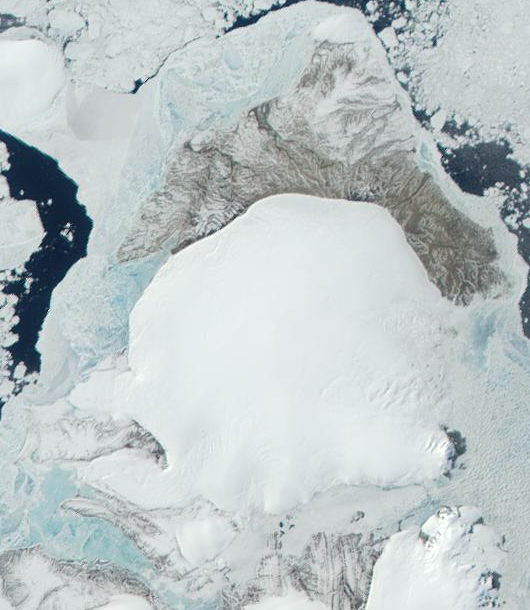
- Terra-MODIS image of Komsomolets Island from June 2001

- Location within Krasnoyarsk Krai Location within Arctic

Geography
- Location: Krasnoyarsk Krai, Russia
- Coordinates: 80°29′03″N 94°59′47″E
- Archipelago: Severnaya Zemlya, Russia
- Area: 9,006 km^{2} (3,477 sq mi)
- Highest elevation: 935 m (3068 ft)

Administration
- Russia

Komsomolets Island in Severnaya Zemlya

Komsomolets Island (Russian: остров Комсомолец) is the northernmost island of the Severnaya Zemlya group in the Russian Arctic, and the third largest island in the group. It is the 82nd largest island on earth. About 65% of the island is covered with glaciers, including Russia's largest, the Academy of Sciences Glacier.

== Geography ==
Komsomolets Island is separated from October Revolution Island in the south by the Red Army Strait and from Pioneer Island in the southwest by the Yuny Strait. The northernmost point of the island is the Arctic Cape, the launching point for many Arctic expeditions.

Practically the whole of the central and southern part of the island is covered by the massive Academy of Sciences Glacier, between Krenkel Bay in the east and Zhuravlev Bay in the west. The northern part is largely unglaciated. The area of this island has been estimated at 9,006 km^{2}. It rises to a height of 780 m.

== Geology ==
The soil of the island is mostly composed of loose loam and sands, a tundra desert scattered with mosses and lichens.

== History ==
The island was discovered by Boris Vilkitsky in 1913, but it was not proven to be an island until 1931, when Georgy Ushakov and Nikolay Urvantsev charted the archipelago during their 1930–32 expedition. They also named it. In keeping with their tradition of naming the islands after events and movements of the Russian Revolution, this island was named in honour of the members of the Komsomol, the "Communist Union of Youth."

== Photo gallery ==
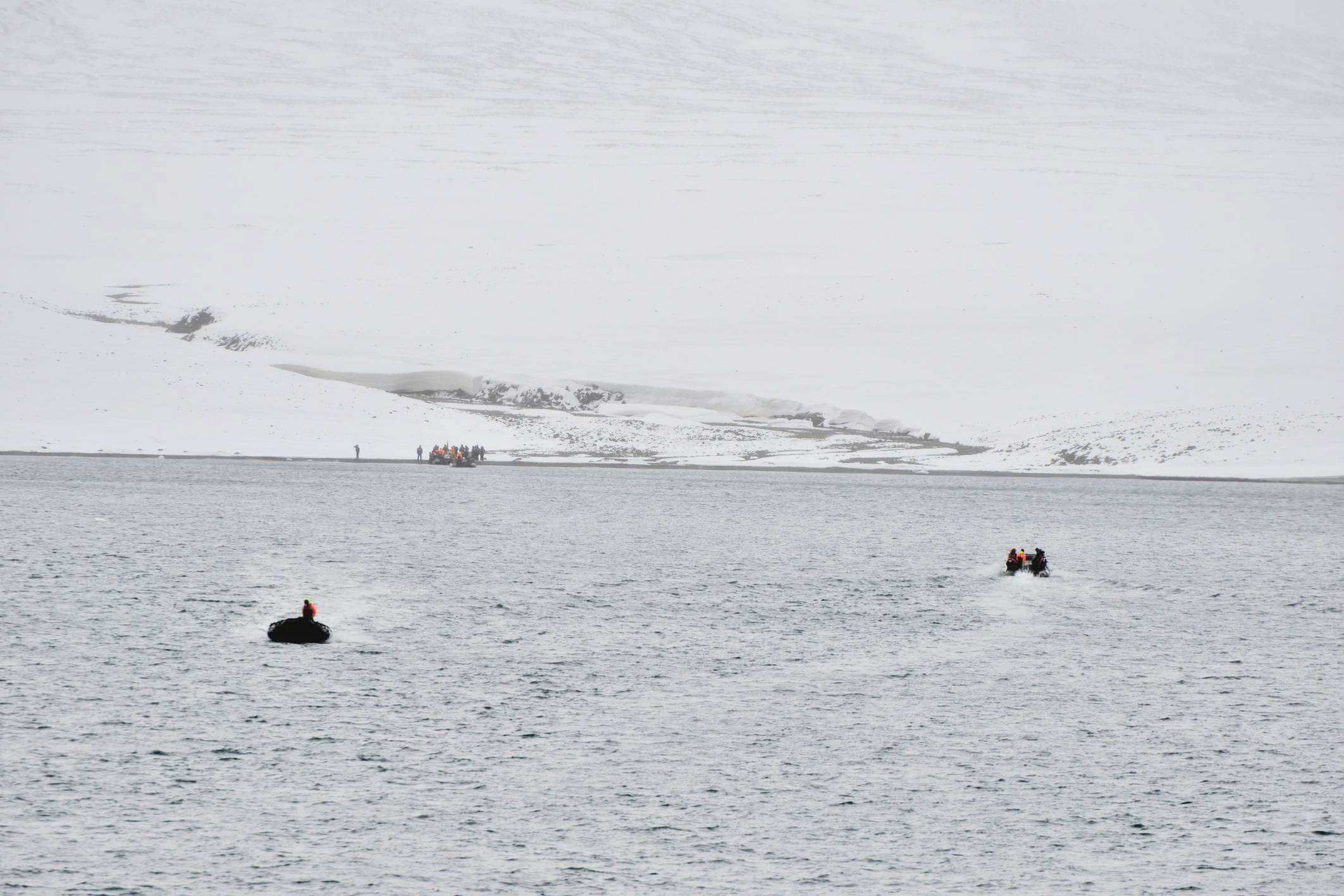
Krenkel Bay, eastern coast of Komsomolets Island (80°40’N, 97°30‘O)

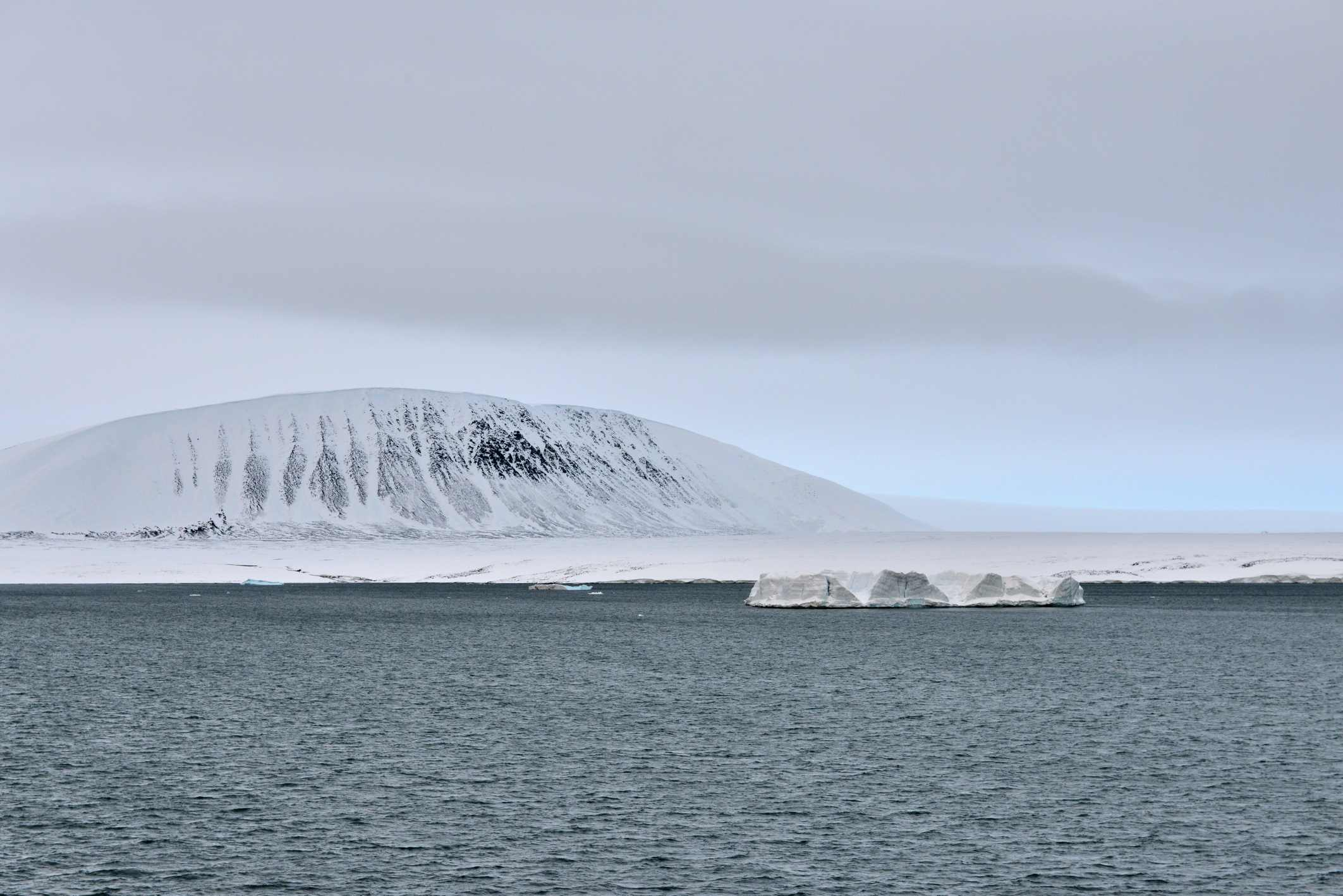
Krenkel Bay

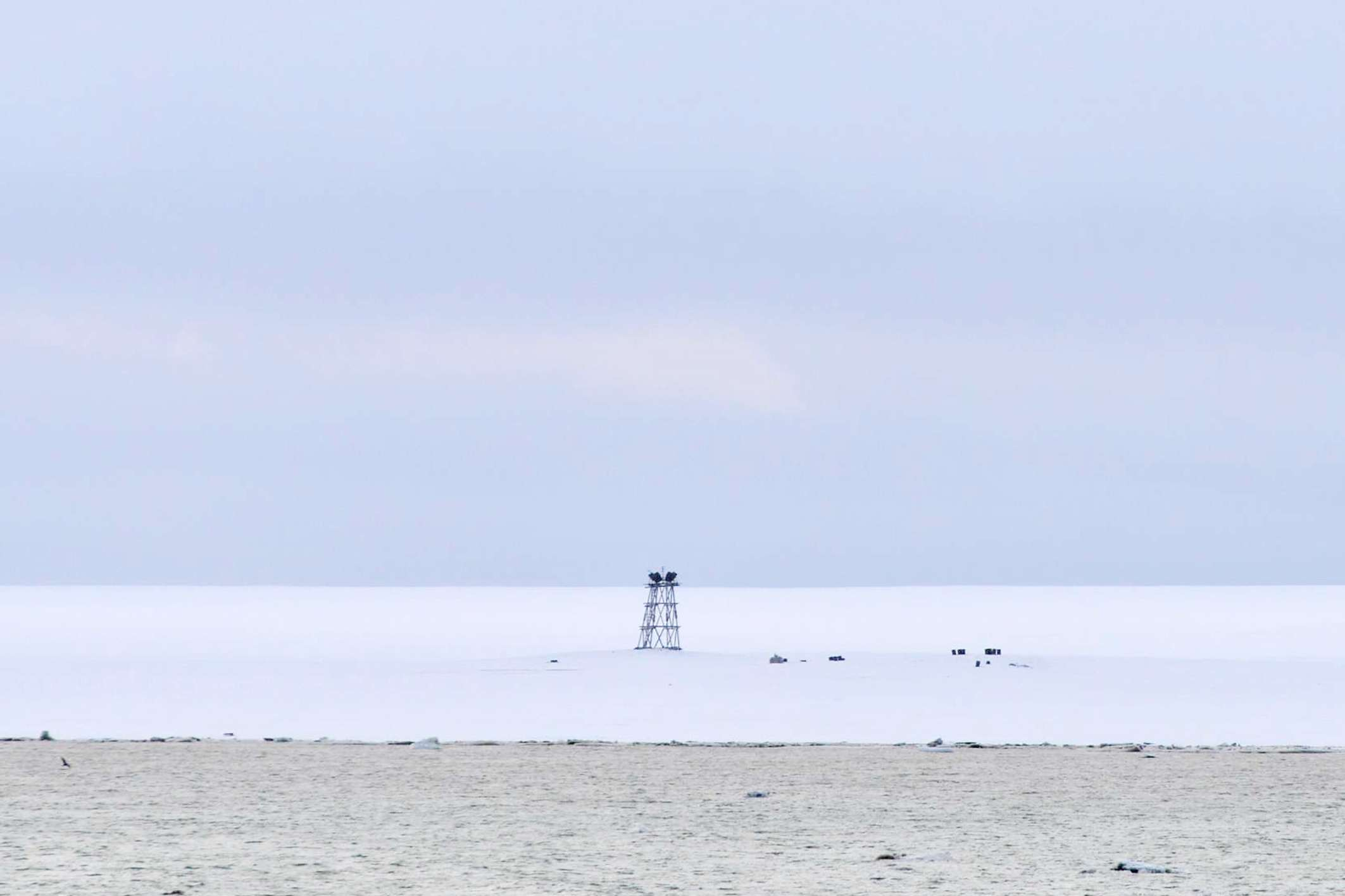
Abandoned Russian polar station Izluchina (Northeast coast of Komsomolets Island; 81°N, 96°33’E).

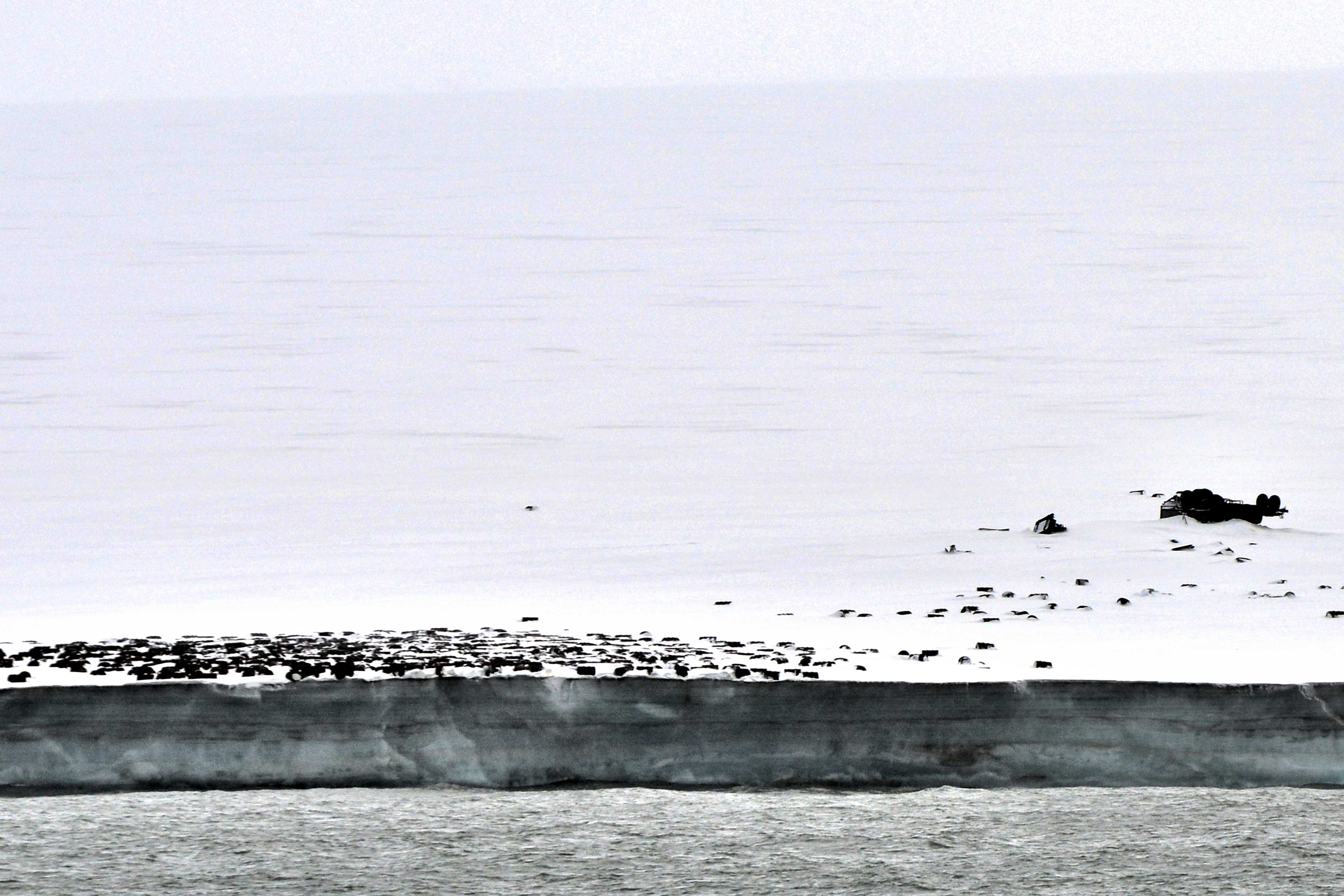
Komsomolets Island:
Empty oil drums at Arctic Cape (Komsomolets Island; 81°15‘N, 95°39‘E).

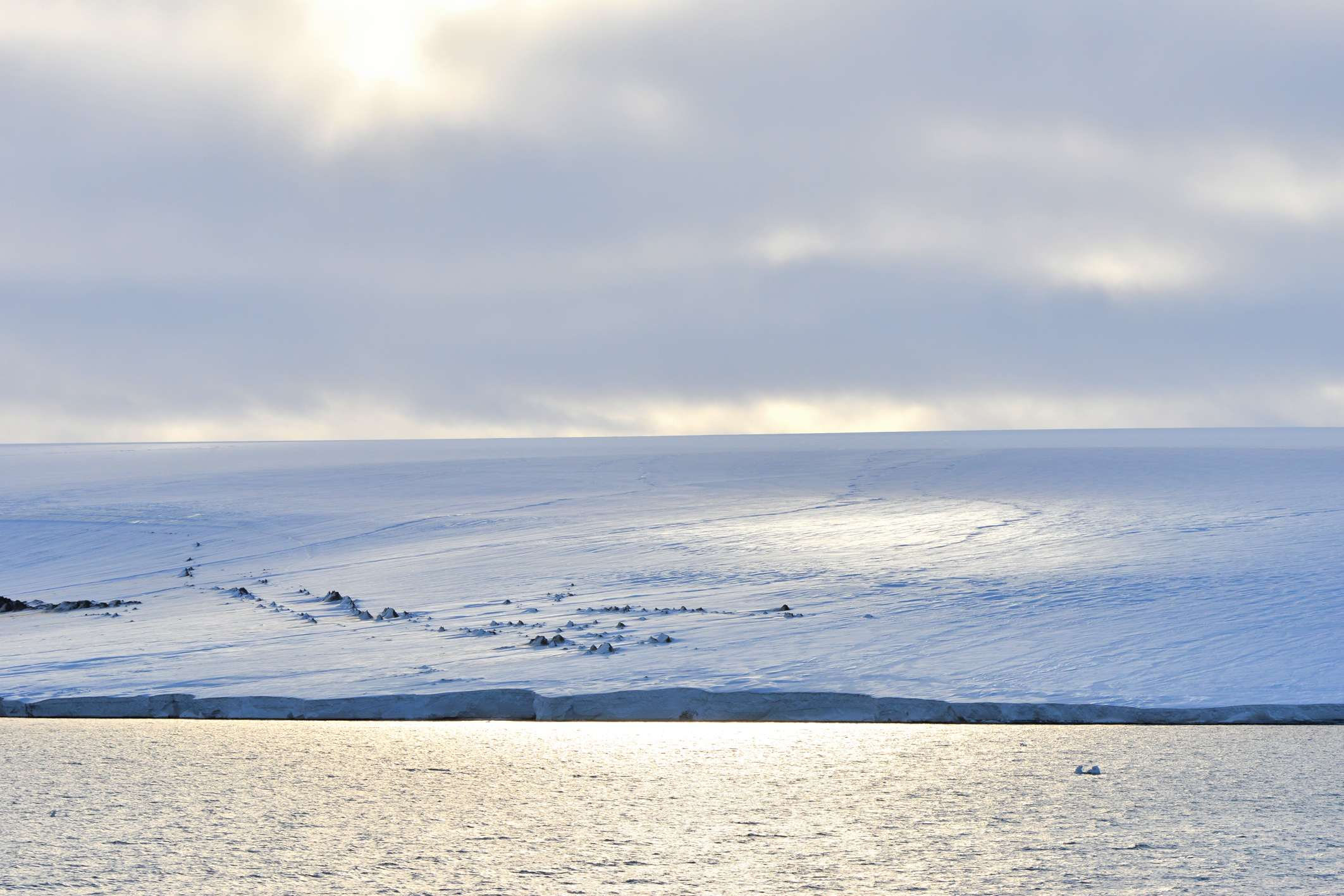
Zhuravlev Bay, located in the west coast of Komsomolets Island (80°44’N, 93°19‘E).

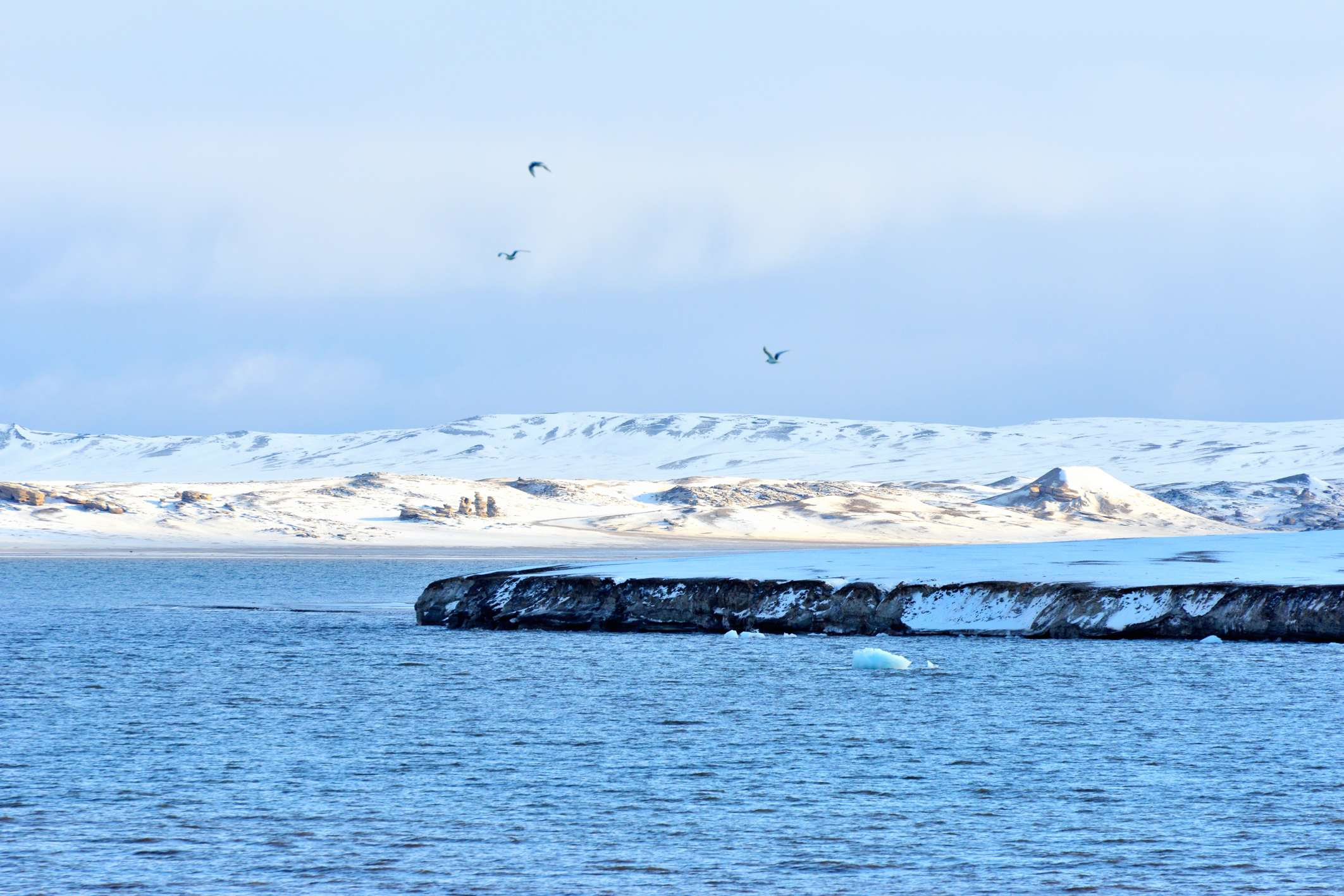
Zhuravlev Bay

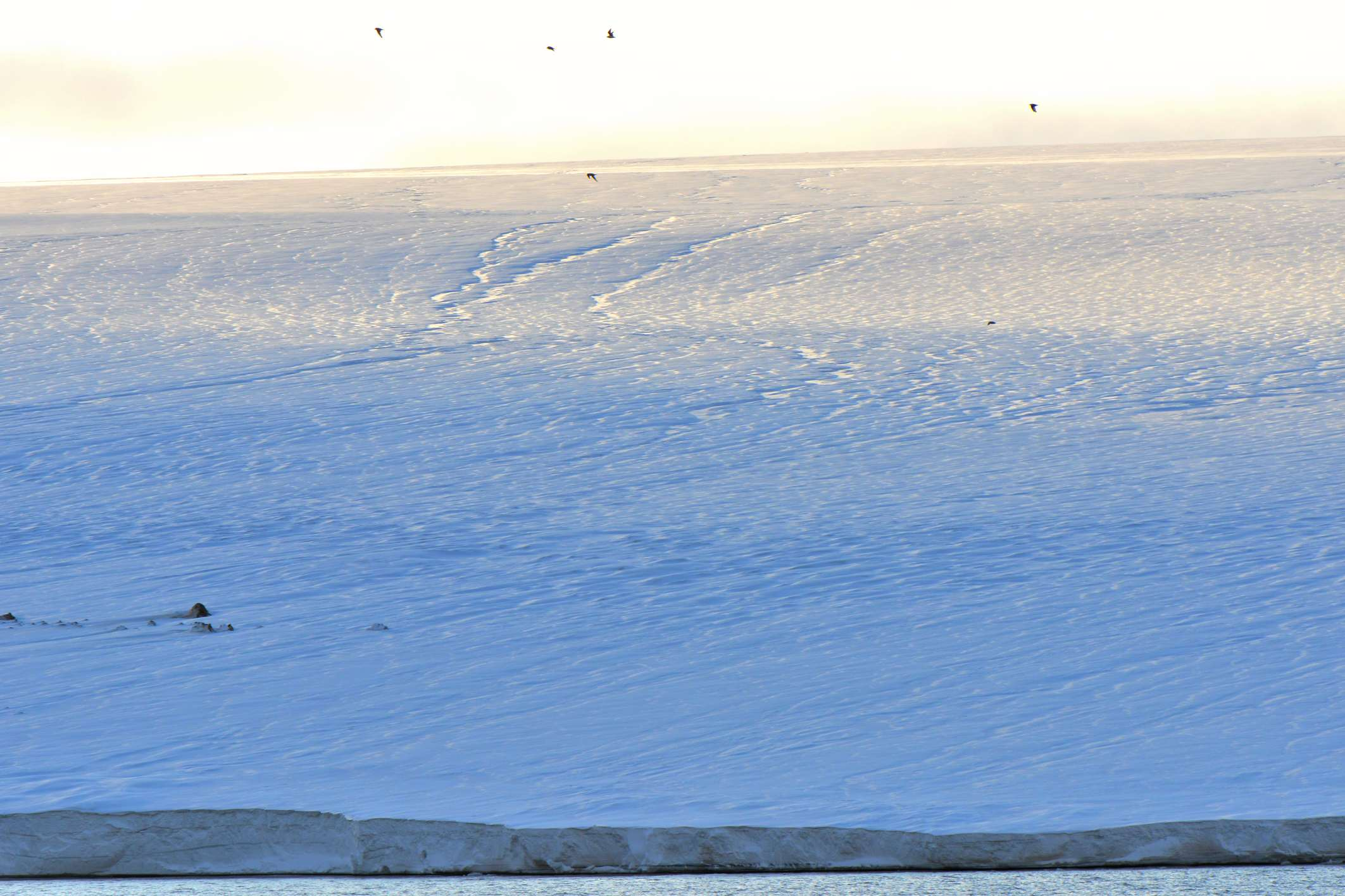
Zhuravlev Bay

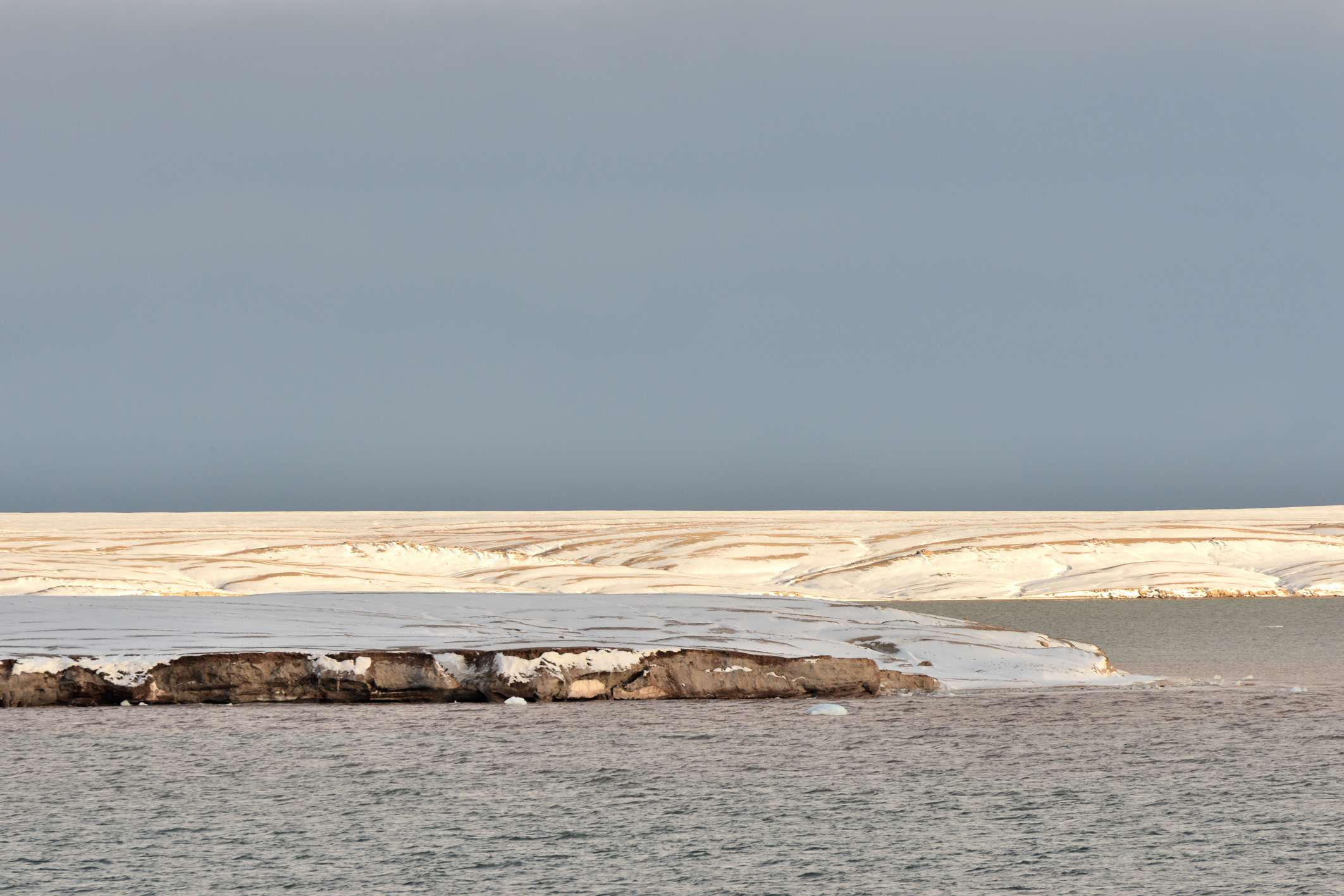
Zhuravlev Bay
