= List of fjords of Russia =

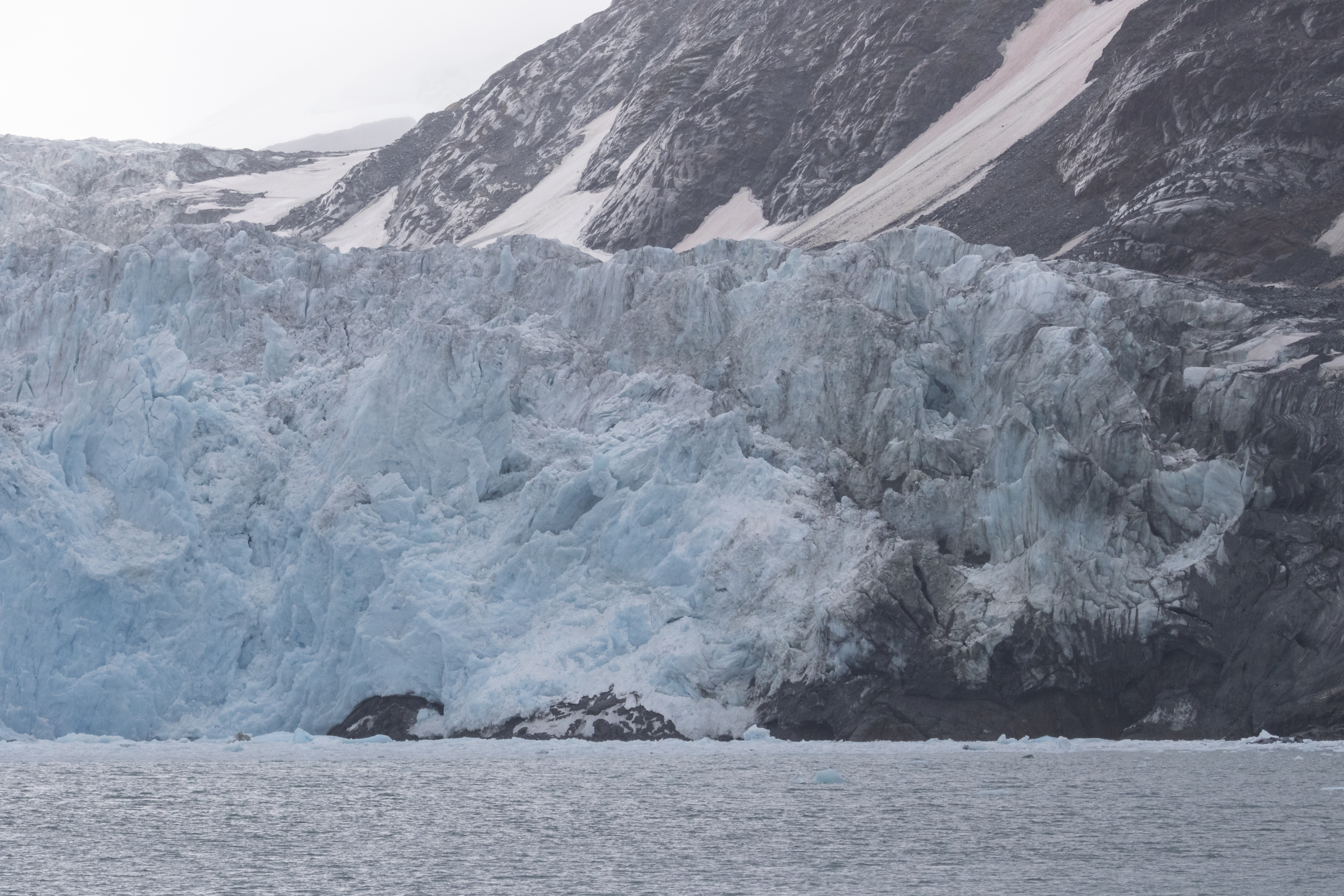
The calving end of a glacier at a fjord in Novaya Zemlya.

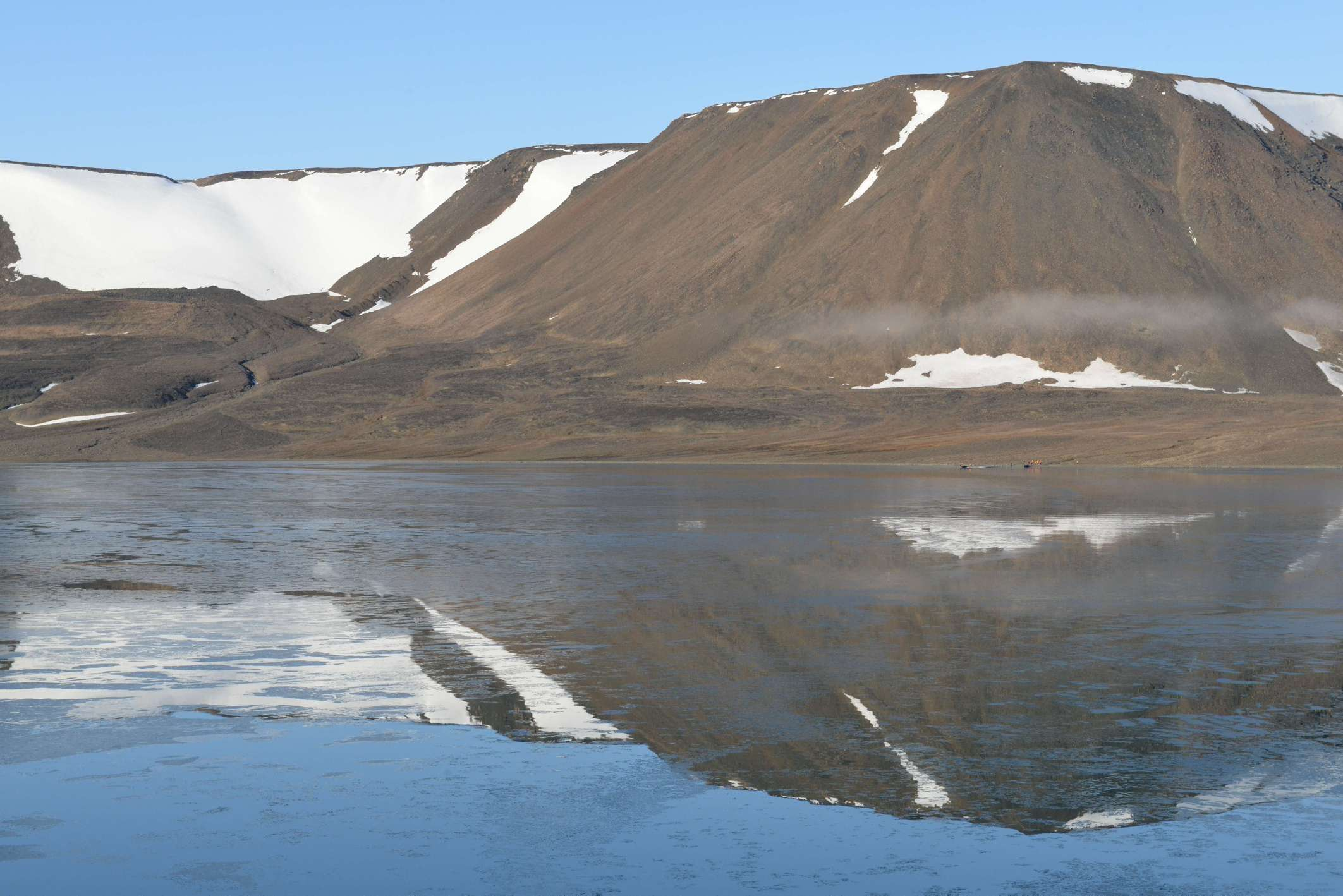
View of Akhmatov Fjord, Bolshevik Island, Severnaya Zemlya.

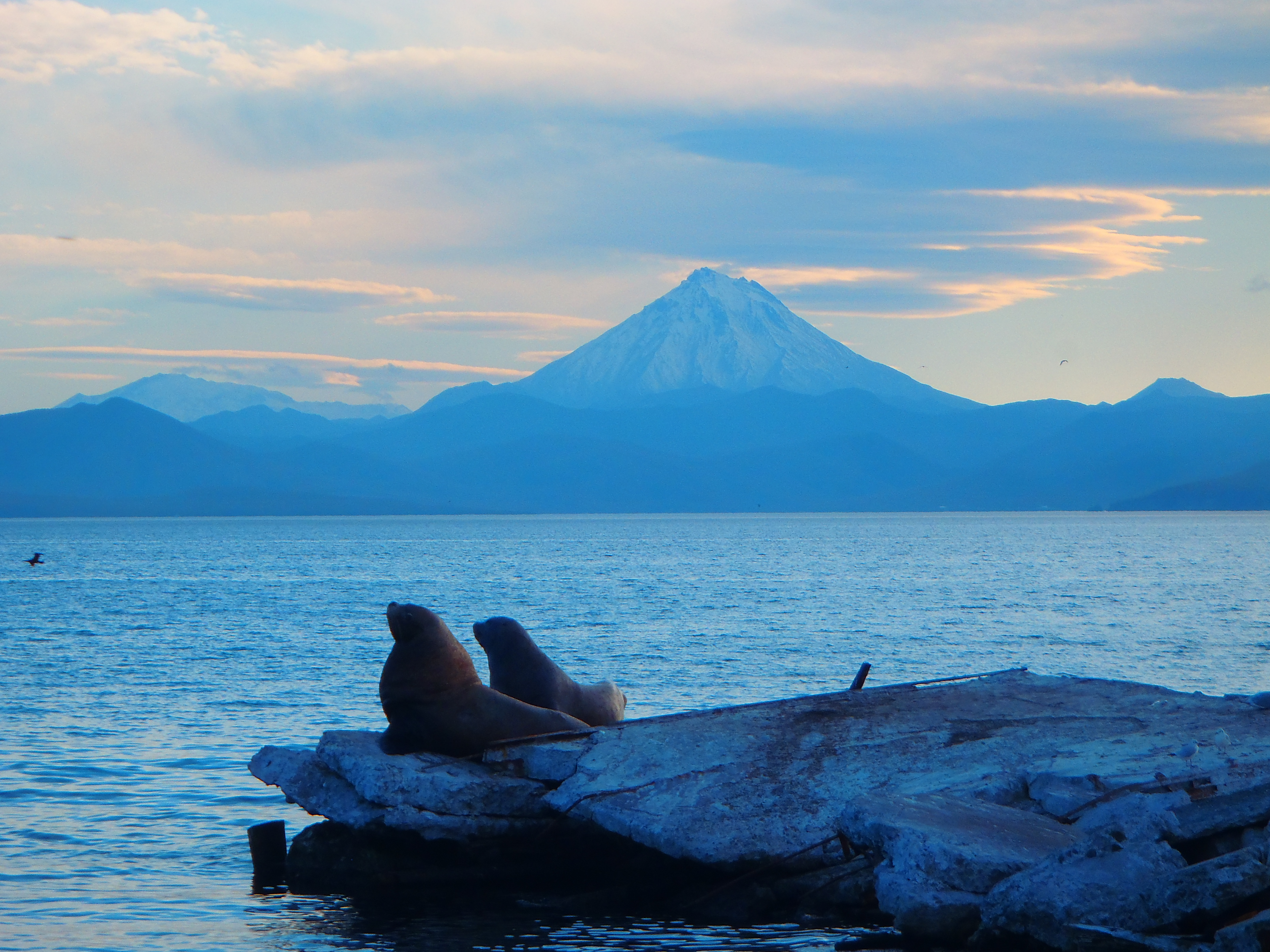
View of a fjord in southeastern Kamchatka.

This is a list of the most important fjords of the Russian Federation (Russian: фьорды Российской Федерации).

== Fjords ==
In spite of the vastness of the Arctic coastlines of the Russian Federation there are relatively few fjords in Russia. Fjords are circumscribed to certain areas only; over thirty are in Novaya Zemlya —including lakes which are structurally fjords, with a few others in the Barents Sea coast of the Kola Peninsula, the Severnaya Zemlya archipelago, the Bering Sea coast of the Chukchi Peninsula and the southeastern shores of Kamchatka.

- Akhmatov Fjord, Bolshevik Island, Severnaya Zemlya
- Ara Bay, Kola Peninsula
- Arkhangelskaya Bay, Novaya Zemlya
- Bezymyannaya Fjord, Novaya Zemlya
- Blafyel Bay, Novaya Zemlya
- Bolshaya Karmakulskaya, Novaya Zemlya
- Bolshaya Volokovaya, Kola Peninsula
- Borzov Bay, Novaya Zemlya
- Brandt Bay, Novaya Zemlya
- Chekin Bay, Novaya Zemlya
- Dolgaya Shchel, Kola Peninsula
- Goltsovoye Lake, Novaya Zemlya (a lake with a fjord structure)
- Gribovaya Bay (Gribovii Fjord), Novaya Zemlya
- Inostrantsev Bay, Novaya Zemlya
- Khutuda Fjord, Taymyr Peninsula
- Kislaya Guba, Kola Peninsula
- Kola Bay (Murmansk Fjord), Kola Peninsula
- Klokov Fjord, Novaya Zemlya
- Krestovaya Bay, Novaya Zemlya
- Krivoshein Bay, Novaya Zemlya
- Lednikovoye Lake, Novaya Zemlya (a lake with a fjord structure)
- Litke Fjord, Novaya Zemlya
- Maka Bay, Novaya Zemlya
- Malaya Volokovaya, Kola Peninsula
- Marat Fjord, October Revolution Island, Severnaya Zemlya
- Mashigin Fjord, Novaya Zemlya
- Matochkin Shar, Novaya Zemlya (a strait with a fjord structure)
  - Meta Bay, a northern branch of Matochkin Shar
- Matusevich Fjord, October Revolution Island, Severnaya Zemlya
- Medvezhy Bay, Novaya Zemlya
- Mityushikha Bay (Mytyushev Bay), Novaya Zemlya
- Neznayemy Bay, Novaya Zemlya
- Nordenskiöld Bay, Novaya Zemlya
- Northern Sulmenev Bay, Novaya Zemlya
- Oga Bay, Novaya Zemlya
- Partizan Fjord, Bolshevik Island, Severnaya Zemlya
- Pechenga Bay, Kola Peninsula
- Penkigney Bay, Chukchi Peninsula
- Polisadov Bay, Novaya Zemlya
- Providence Bay, Chukchi Peninsula
- Pukhov Fjord, Novaya Zemlya
- Russkaya Bay, Kamchatka
- Russkaya Gavan' Fjord, Novaya Zemlya
- Serebryanka fjord, Novaya Zemlya
- Sedov Bay, Novaya Zemlya
- Shubert Bay, Novaya Zemlya
- Southern Sulmenev Bay, Novaya Zemlya
- Spartak Fjord, Bolshevik Island, Severnaya Zemlya
- Stepovoy Fjord, Novaya Zemlya
- Tarya Bay, Kamchatka
- Tereza Klavenes Fjord, Taymyr Peninsula
- Thaelmann Fjord, Bolshevik Island, Severnaya Zemlya
- Tsivolko Bay (Ziwolka Fjord), Novaya Zemlya
- Tumannaya Bay, Bolshevik Island, Severnaya Zemlya
- Ura Bay, Kola Peninsula
- Vera Bay, Novaya Zemlya
- Vilkitsky Bay, Novaya Zemlya
- Vilyuchin Bay, Kamchatka
- Voryema Bay, Kola Peninsula
- Zapadnaya Litsa, Kola Peninsula

== See also ==
- List of glaciers in Russia
