= Isthmus =

Strip of land connecting two larger areas

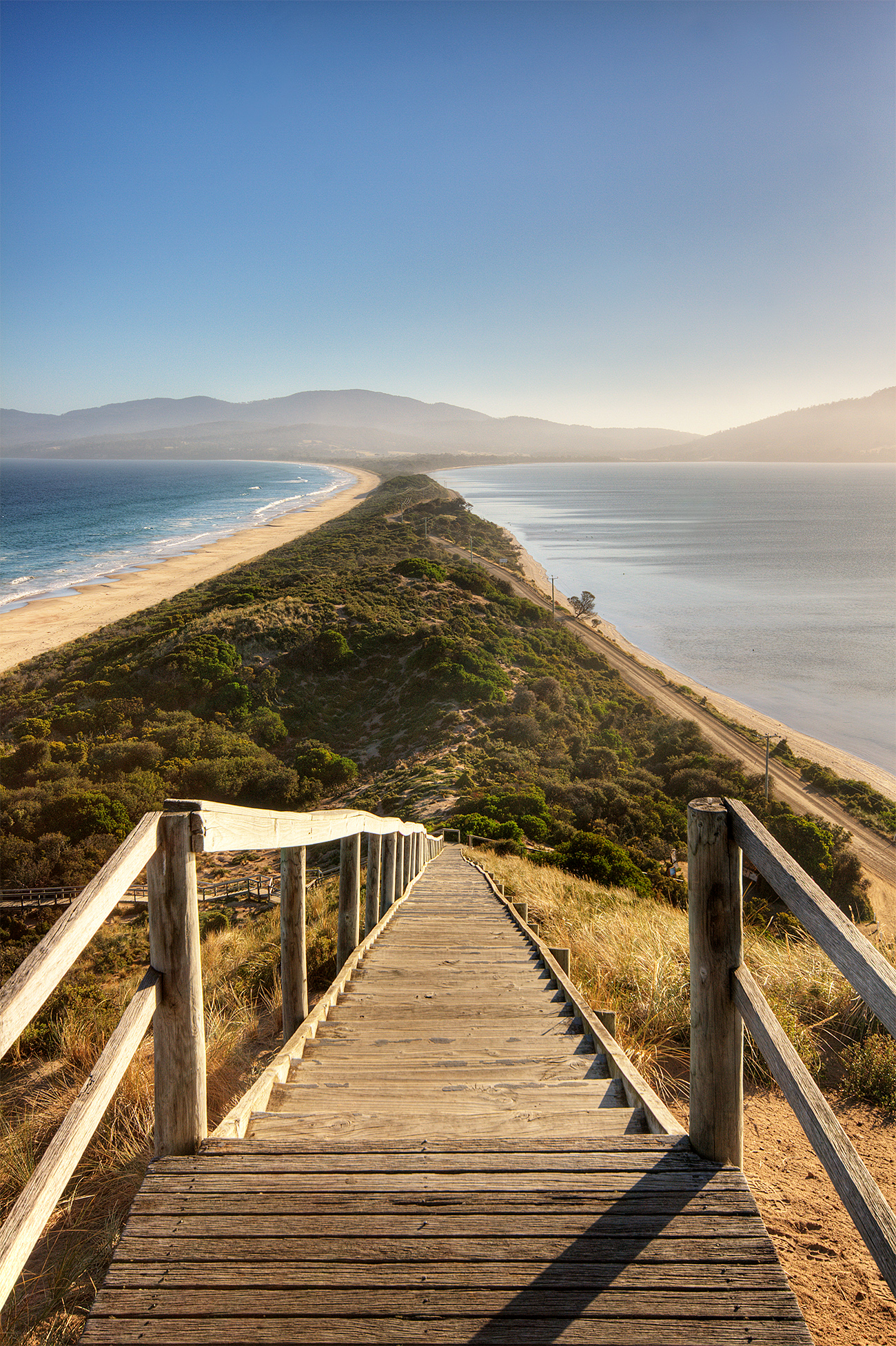
The sandy isthmus or tombolo "The Neck" connects North and South Bruny Island in Tasmania, Australia.

An isthmus (/ˈɪs(θ)məs/ ISS-məs, ISTH-məs; pl.: isthmuses or isthmi /-maɪ/ -my; from Ancient Greek ἰσθμός isthmós 'neck') is a narrow piece of land connecting two larger areas across an expanse of water by which they are otherwise separated. A tombolo is an isthmus that consists of a spit or bar. The inverse counterpart of an isthmus is a strait, a narrow stretch of sea between two landmasses that connects two larger bodies of water.

== Isthmus vs land bridge vs peninsula ==
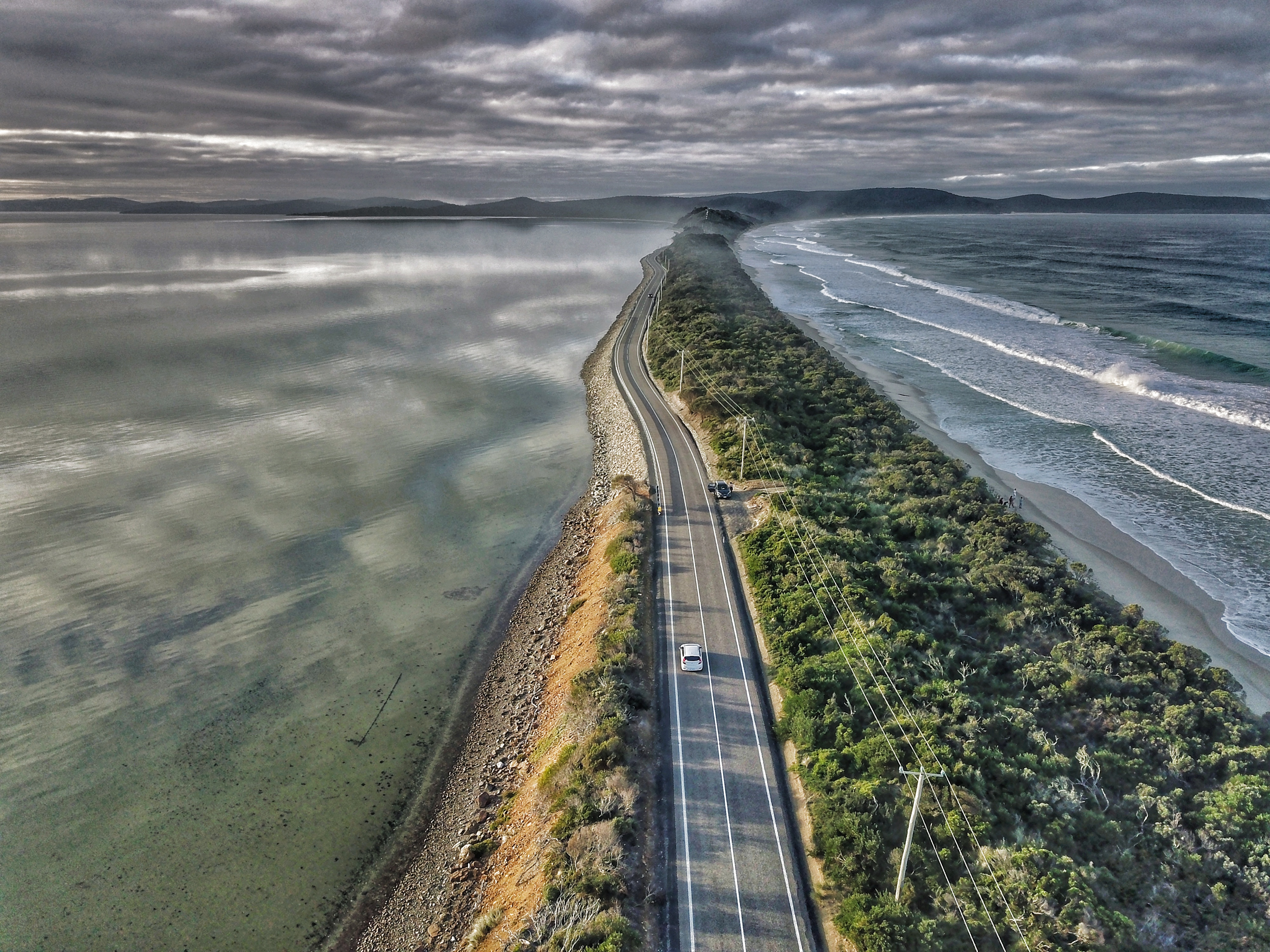
Aerial perspective of the isthmus of Bruny Island

Isthmus and land bridge are related terms, with isthmus having a broader meaning. A land bridge is an isthmus connecting Earth's major landmasses. The term land bridge is usually used in biogeology to describe land connections that used to exist between continents at various times and were important for the migration of people and various species of animals and plants, such as Beringia and Doggerland.

An isthmus is a land connection between two larger landmasses, while a peninsula is rather a land protrusion that is connected to a bigger landmass on one side only and surrounded by water on all other sides. Technically, an isthmus can have canals running from coast to coast (e.g., the Panama Canal), and thus resemble two peninsulas; however, canals are artificial features, as distinguished from naturally occurring straits.

== Major isthmuses ==
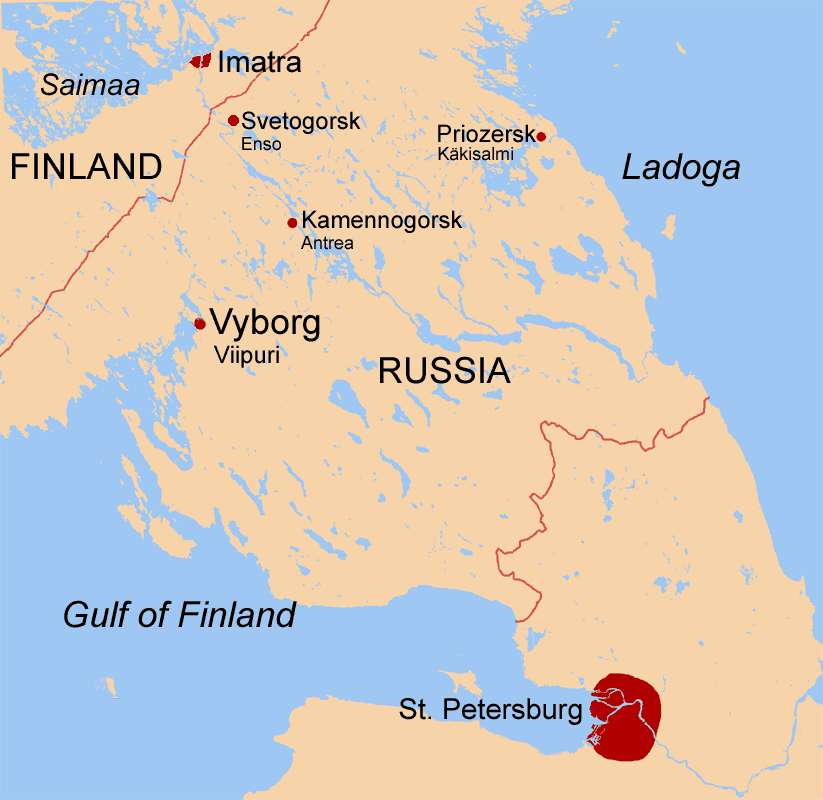
Karelian Isthmus in Russia, which lies between the Gulf of Finland and Lake Ladoga

The world's major isthmuses include:

- Karelian Isthmus in Europe
- Kra Isthmus in Mainland Southeast Asia
- Bird's Neck Isthmus in Western New Guinea
- Isthmus of Tehuantepec in Middle America
- Isthmus of Perekop in Ukraine
- Isthmus of Panama in Middle America
- Isthmus of Suez between North Africa and Western Asia

Of historic importance were:

- Isthmus of Catanzaro in Italy
- Isthmus of Corinth in Greece

The cities of Auckland; Madison, Wisconsin; Manila; Seattle; and Tampere are located on isthmuses.

== Canals ==
Canals are often built across isthmuses, where they may be a particularly advantageous shortcut for marine transport. For example:

- The Panama Canal crosses the Isthmus of Panama, connecting the Atlantic and Pacific Oceans
- The Suez Canal connects the Mediterranean Sea (part of the Atlantic Ocean) and the Red Sea (part of the Indian Ocean), cutting across the western side of the Isthmus of Suez, formed by the Sinai Peninsula
- The Crinan Canal crosses the isthmus between Loch Crinan and Loch Gilp, which connects the Kintyre peninsula with the rest of Scotland
- The Welland Canal in the Niagara Peninsula (technically an isthmus); it connects Lake Ontario to Lake Erie
- The Corinth Canal connects the Gulf of Corinth in the Ionian Sea with the Saronic Gulf in the Aegean Sea
- The Lake Washington Ship Canal connects the Puget Sound to Lake Washington in Seattle via Lake Union

== See also ==
- Land bridge – Connection between two landform bodies
- List of isthmuses
- List of straits
