= 72nd meridian west =

Line of longitude

72nd meridian west (interactive map)

The meridian 72° west of Greenwich is a line of longitude that extends from the North Pole across the Arctic Ocean, North America, the Atlantic Ocean, the Caribbean Sea, South America, the Pacific Ocean, the Southern Ocean, and Antarctica to the South Pole.

The 72nd meridian west forms a great circle with the 108th meridian east.

== From Pole to Pole ==
Starting at the North Pole and heading south to the South Pole, the 72nd meridian west passes through:

| Co-ordinates | Country, territory or sea | Notes |
|---|---|---|
| 90°0′N 72°0′W | Arctic Ocean | |
| 83°6′N 72°0′W | Canada | Nunavut – Ellesmere Island |
| 79°41′N 72°0′W | Nares Strait | |
| 78°33′N 72°0′W | Greenland | Inglefield Land |
| 77°54′N 72°0′W | Baffin Bay | |
| 77°26′N 72°0′W | Greenland | Kiatak (Northumberland Island) |
| 77°18′N 72°0′W | Baffin Bay | |
| 71°34′N 72°0′W | Canada | Nunavut – Baffin Island, Sillem Island and Baffin Island again |
| 63°23′N 72°0′W | Hudson Strait | |
| 61°52′N 72°0′W | Canada | Nunavut – Wales Island |
| 61°51′N 72°0′W | Hudson Strait | |
| 61°41′N 72°0′W | Canada | Quebec – passing just west of Sherbrooke |
| 45°0′N 72°0′W | United States | Vermont; New Hampshire – from 44°19′N 72°0′W; Massachusetts – from 42°43′N 72°0′W; Connecticut – from 42°1′N 72°0′W |
| 41.31°N 72.0°W | Atlantic Ocean | Fishers Island Sound |
| 41°17′N 72°0′W | United States | New York – Fishers Island |
| 41°15′N 72°0′W | Atlantic Ocean | Block Island Sound |
| 41°3′N 72°0′W | United States | New York – Long Island |
| 41°1′N 72°0′W | Atlantic Ocean | |
| 21°58′N 72°0′W | Turks and Caicos Islands | Island of North Caicos |
| 21°54′N 72°0′W | Atlantic Ocean | |
| 19°42′N 72°0′W | Haiti | |
| 18°38′N 72°0′W | Dominican Republic | For about 1 km |
| 18°37′N 72°0′W | Haiti | |
| 18°12′N 72°0′W | Caribbean Sea | |
| 12°15′N 72°0′W | Colombia | |
| 11°35′N 72°0′W | Venezuela | Passing through Lake Maracaibo |
| 7°1′N 72°0′W | Colombia | |
| 2°21′S 72°0′W | Peru | |
| 4°38′S 72°0′W | Brazil | Amazonas; Acre – from 7°46′S 72°0′W |
| 10°0′S 72°0′W | Peru | Passing just west of Cusco at 13°31′S 71°58′W |
| 17°2′S 72°0′W | Pacific Ocean | |
| 34°7′S 72°0′W | Chile | For about 6 km |
| 34°11′S 72°0′W | Pacific Ocean | |
| 34°22′S 72°0′W | Chile | |
| 42°9′S 72°0′W | Argentina | |
| 43°2′S 72°0′W | Chile | |
| 44°46′S 72°0′W | Argentina | For about 14 km |
| 44°54′S 72°0′W | Chile | |
| 47°19′S 72°0′W | Argentina | |
| 51°49′S 72°0′W | Chile | For about 12 km |
| 51°56′S 72°0′W | Argentina | For about 3 km |
| 51°58′S 72°0′W | Chile | Mainland, Riesco Island and Brunswick Peninsula (mainland) |
| 53°42′S 72°0′W | Straits of Magellan | |
| 53°54′S 72°0′W | Chile | Clarence Island, Isla Grande de Tierra del Fuego and London Island |
| 54°43′S 72°0′W | Pacific Ocean | |
| 60°0′S 72°0′W | Southern Ocean | |
| 69°2′S 72°0′W | Antarctica | Alexander Island and mainland – claimed by Argentina (Argentine Antarctica), Chile (Antártica Chilena Province) and United Kingdom (British Antarctic Territory) |

== See also ==
- 71st meridian west
- 73rd meridian west
