= List of islands of Russia =

This is a list of islands of Russia. It includes all islands in Russia with an area greater than 3,000 square kilometres (1,158 sq mi) and some of the more significant minor islands.

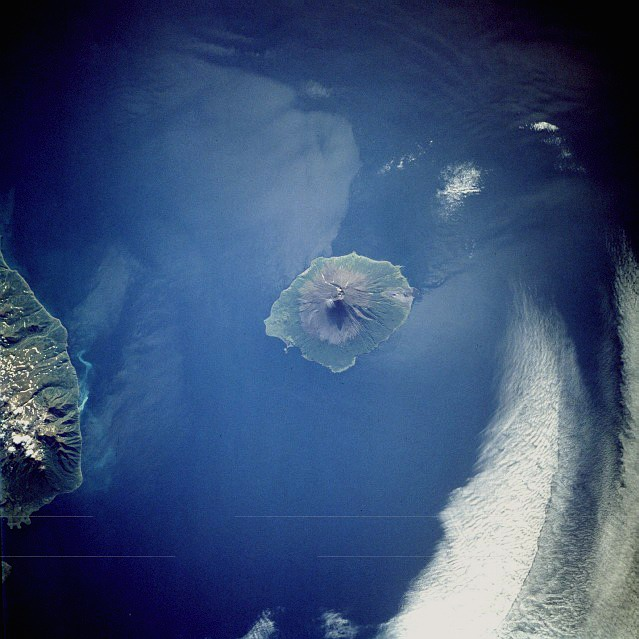
Atlasov Island from space, September 1992

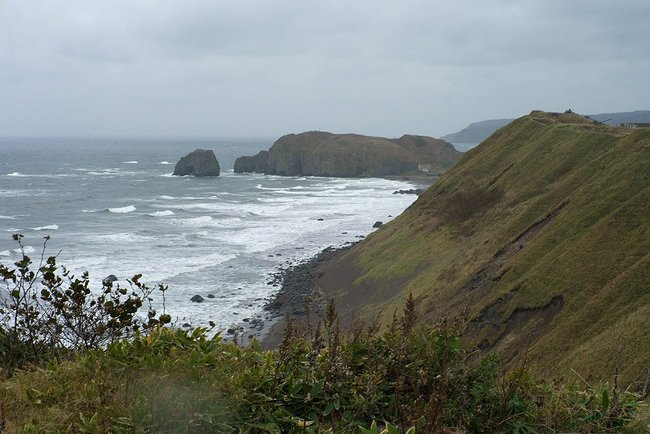
Kunashir Island coastline: photo taken by Russian president Dmitry Medvedev in November 2010

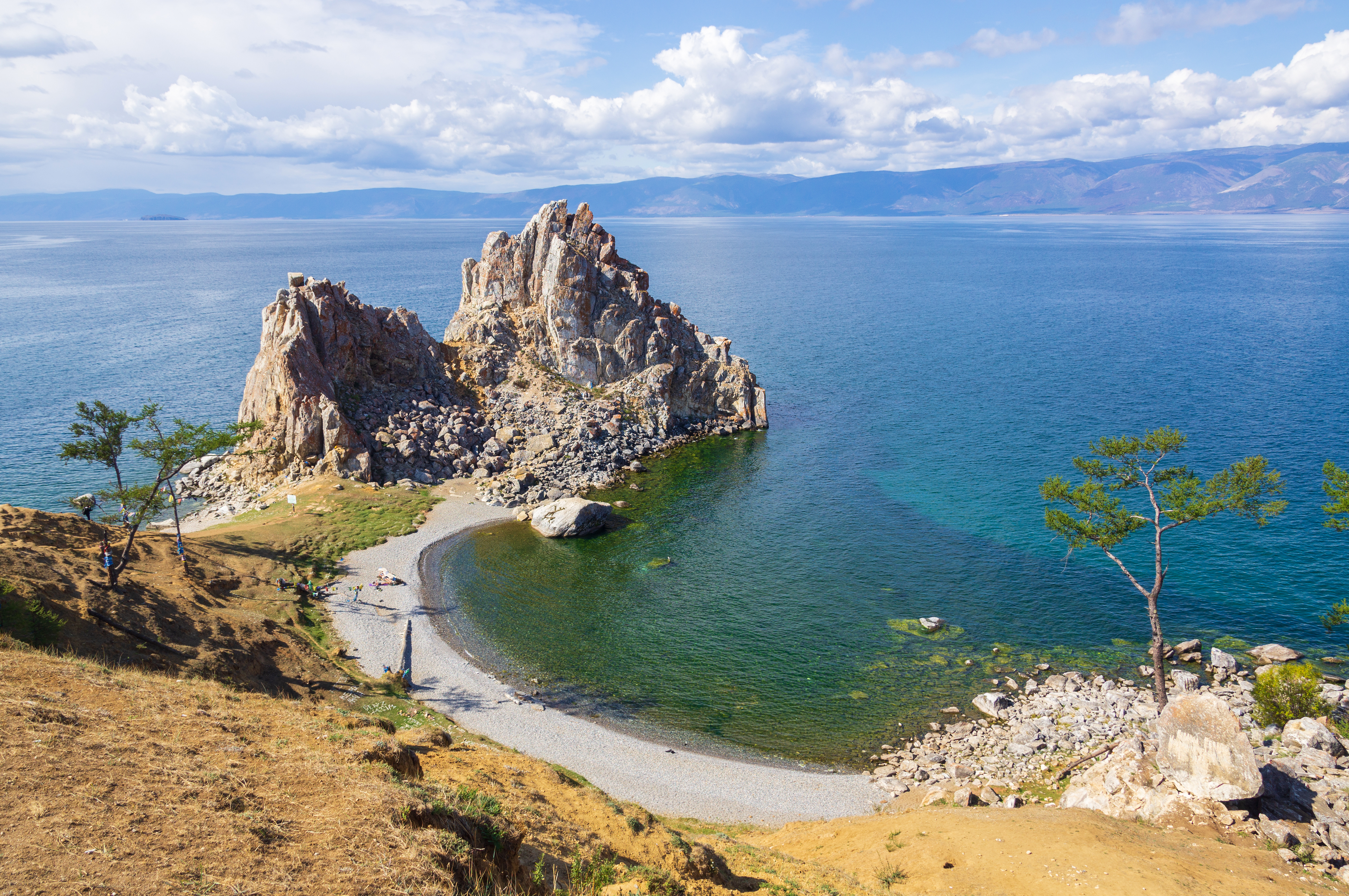
The Shamanka Шаманка, a holy rock in Shamanism and one of the nine holiest places in Asia, on the west coast of Olkhon

- Aleksandry, Franz Josef Land
- Atlasov Island, Kuril Islands
- Ayon
- Belkovsky, New Siberian Islands
- Bely Island, in the Kara Sea
- Bennett Island, De Long Islands
- Big Diomede (Ratmanov Island)
- Bolotny Ostrov, Moskva River, Moscow city
- Bolshevik Island, Severnaya Zemlya
- Bolshoy Lyakhovsky
- Bolshoy Shantar Island, Shantar Islands
- De Long, New Siberian Islands
- Dikson Island, in the Kara Sea
- Georga, Franz Josef Land
- Gogland, Gulf of Finland
- Graham Bell Island, Franz Josef Land
- Henrietta Island, De Long Islands
- Herald Island
- Iony Island, Sea of Okhotsk
- Iturup (Etorofu), Kuril Islands, claimed by Japan
- Jeannette Island, De Long Islands
- Karaginsky Island
- Kolguyev
- Komsomolets, Severnaya Zemlya
- Kotelny Island, New Siberian Islands
- Kunashir, Kuril Islands
- Lisy Island, Nakhodka Bay
- Maly Taymyr Island
- Mezhdusharskiy Island, Novaya Zemlya
- Novaya Sibir, New Siberian Islands
- Novaya Zemlya
- Oktyabrskoy Revolyutsii, Severnaya Zemlya
- Oleny Island
- Olkhon Island, Lake Baikal
- Onekotan, Kuril Islands
- Rudolfa, Franz Josef Land
- Paramushir, Kuril Islands
- Pioneer, Severnaya Zemlya
- Popov Island, Eugénie Archipelago
- Putyatin Island
- Reyneke Island, Eugénie Archipelago
- Rodsher, Gulf of Finland
- Russky Island, Eugénie Archipelago
- Russky Island, Nordenskiöld Archipelago
- Sakhalin
- Salm Island, Franz Josef Land
- Schmidt Island, Severnaya Zemlya
- Severny Island, Novaya Zemlya
- Shiashkotan, Kuril Islands
- Shumshu, Kuril Islands
- Simushir, Kuril Islands
- Solovetskiye
- Taymyr Island
- Uyedineniya Island, northern fringe of the Kara Sea
- Urup, Kuril Islands
- Ushakov Island, northern fringe of the Kara Sea
- Ushkan Islands, Lake Baikal
- Vasilyevsky Island, St. Petersburg
- Vaygach
- Vilcheka, Franz Josef Land
- Vize Island, northern fringe of the Kara Sea
- Wrangel Island (Vrangelya)
- Yaya Island
- Yunosti Island, Angara River in the city of Irkutsk
- Yuzhny, Novaya Zemlya
- Zhokhov Island, De Long Islands
