= 106th meridian =

106th meridian may refer to:

- 106th meridian east, a line of longitude east of the Greenwich Meridian
- 106th meridian west, a line of longitude west of the Greenwich Meridian

106th meridian west	106th meridian east
