= Port of Nakhodka =

Russian seaport on the Sea of Japan

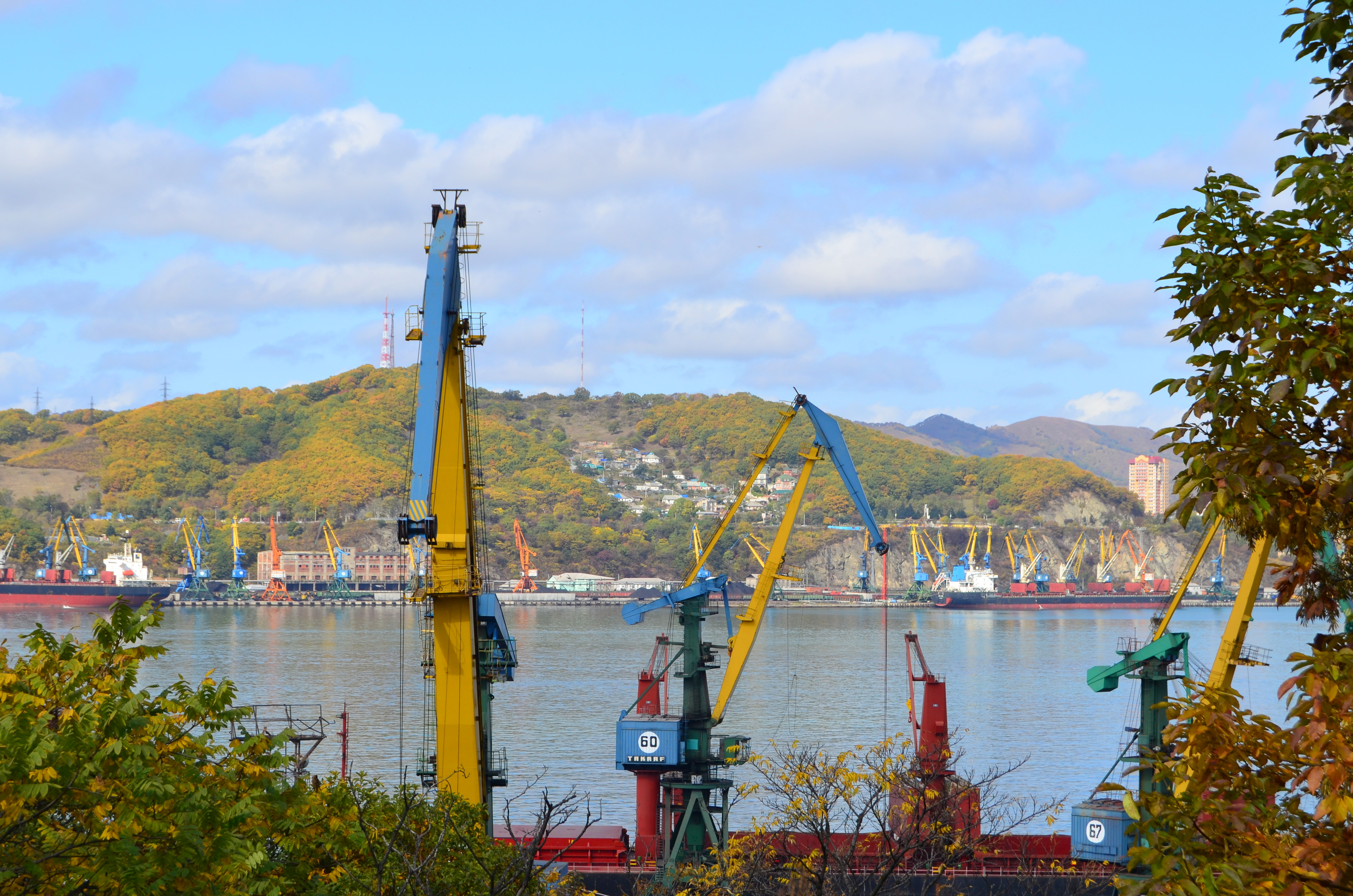
- View of a section of the port.
- Interactive map of Port of Nakhodka
- Location within Primorsky Krai
- Native name: Порт Нахо́дка (Russian)

Location
- Country: Russia
- Location: Nakhodka, Primorsky Krai
- Coordinates: 42.783333°N 132.866667°E

Details
- Owned by: Rosmorport
- Type of Harbor: Commercial port
- Size of harbour: 127.45 square kilometres (49.21 sq mi)
- Land area: 284.24 hectares (702.4 acres)
- No. of wharfs: 120 metres (390 ft)
- Draft depth: 13 metres (43 ft)

Statistics
- Annual cargo tonnage: 26.8 million tons (2020)
- Website www.nmtport.ru

The Port of Nakhodka (Russian: Порт Нахо́дка, romanized: Port Nakhodka) is a Russian seaport of federal importance located in Nakhodka Bay, on the northwestern coast of the Sea of Japan. It forms part of one of Russia's largest transport hubs on the Pacific Ocean, together with the Vostochny Port. In 2020, the port's total cargo volume reached 26.8 million tons. It is situated in the city of Nakhodka, Primorsky Krai, in the Russian Far East.

The port complex includes maritime and oil terminals within Nakhodka Bay, as well as fishing terminals in the bays of Andreyeva, Podyadpol, Yuzhno-Morsk, Gaydamal, Preobrazheniye, Moryak-Rybolov, Nazimov, Pyati Okhotnikov, Sokolovskaian, and at the mouth of the Opritchninka River. Key commodities handled include coal, petroleum products, containers, and refrigerated goods, including fishery resources.

== History ==
Merchant navigation in Nakhodka Bay dates back to the establishment of a trading post by the Department of Siberian Appanages, first mentioned in 1863. Early infrastructure included a pier, warehouses, and a forge to service sea vessels. Most freight operations were conducted by the departmental steamship Nakhodka. In 1906, a cargo-passenger line between Vladivostok and Nakhodka was opened at the mouth of the Suchan River. The steamship Siberia, operated by the Heinrich Keyserling Company, made regular voyages twice a week during this period.

In the 1930s, a railway was extended to Nakhodka Bay near Cape Shefner. A 125-meter pier was constructed, and the Nakhodka port point was officially opened with management offices on Delovaya (now Portovaya) Street.

On October 7, 1939, the Central Committee of the Communist Party of the Soviet Union and the Council of People's Commissars passed a resolution to transfer commercial and fishing port operations from Vladivostok to Nakhodka Bay. The port was largely built by Gulag prisoners under the "Corrective Labor Camp and Construction Directorate No. 213," and from 1942, under the Dalstroy of the NKVD. From 1938 to 1946, Nakhodka served as a transit point for Sevvostlag, where Dalstroy vessels like the Kulu, Dzhurma, and Felix Dzerzhinsky transported prisoners to Magadan in the Kolyma region. This transit system continued until a massive explosion on the ship Dalstroy in the summer of 1946.

The port was officially established on June 17, 1947, by a resolution of the Council of Ministers of the USSR. The first merchant ship to dock was the Danish liner Greta Maersk. The fishing port began operations in 1950, followed by the opening of the Nakhodka Active Marine Fishing Base and the Primorsky Ship Repair Yard in the mid-1950s. The Vostochny and oil loading ports were commissioned in 1973. In 2009, the separate administrations for the commercial, fishing, and oil ports were merged into a single entity.

== Administration ==
State control ensuring navigation safety and order is exercised by the Federal State Institution "Administration of the Seaport of Nakhodka", headed by the Harbor Master.

Following the 2009 administrative merger, the jurisdiction of the Nakhodka Harbor Master was expanded to include fishing terminals located outside Nakhodka Bay, such as those in Livadia, Putyatin, and Preobrazheniye. The Nakhodka Transport Prosecutor's Office supervises legal compliance. Security and border control are managed by the Nakhodka Department of Internal Affairs for Transport and the FSB Border Guard Service, which stations a brigade of patrol ships at Cape Astafyev. Customs operations are handled by the Nakhodka Customs Office, covering the coastline from the closed city of Fokino to the border of Khabarovsk Krai.

== Tonnage ==
Cargo throughput (millions of tons)
Year	2013	2014	2015	2016	2017	2018	2019	2020	2021
Tonnage	18.4	20.7	21.3	23.3	24.2	24.3	25.6	26.8	26.8

== Shipyards ==
Nakhodka Bay is home to several major shipyards, including the Nakhodka Shipyard, the Primorsky Ship Repair Factory, the Far Eastern Ship Mechanical Plant, and the Gaidamak Shipyard.

== Gallery ==
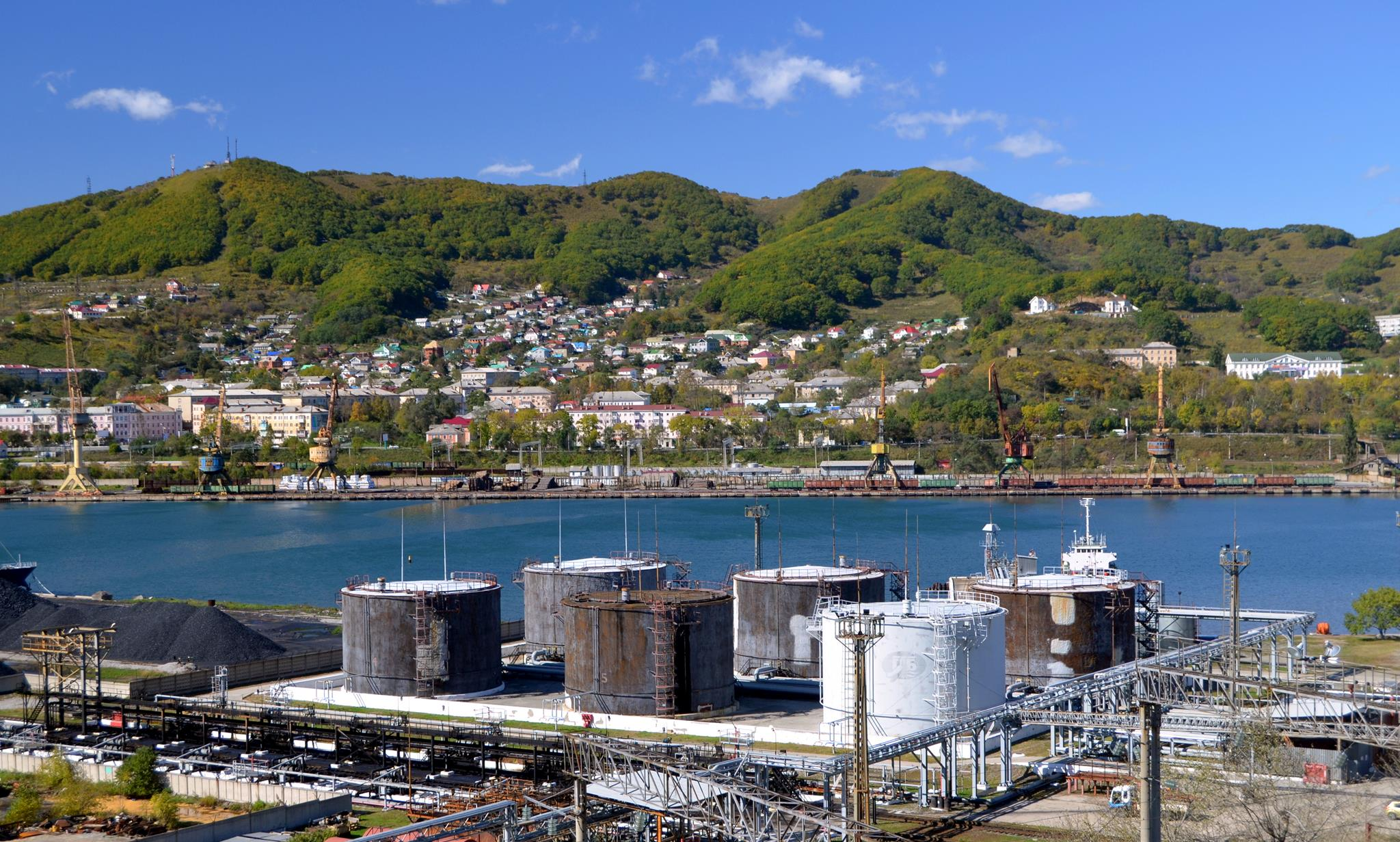
Fuel tanks at the port of Nakhodka.

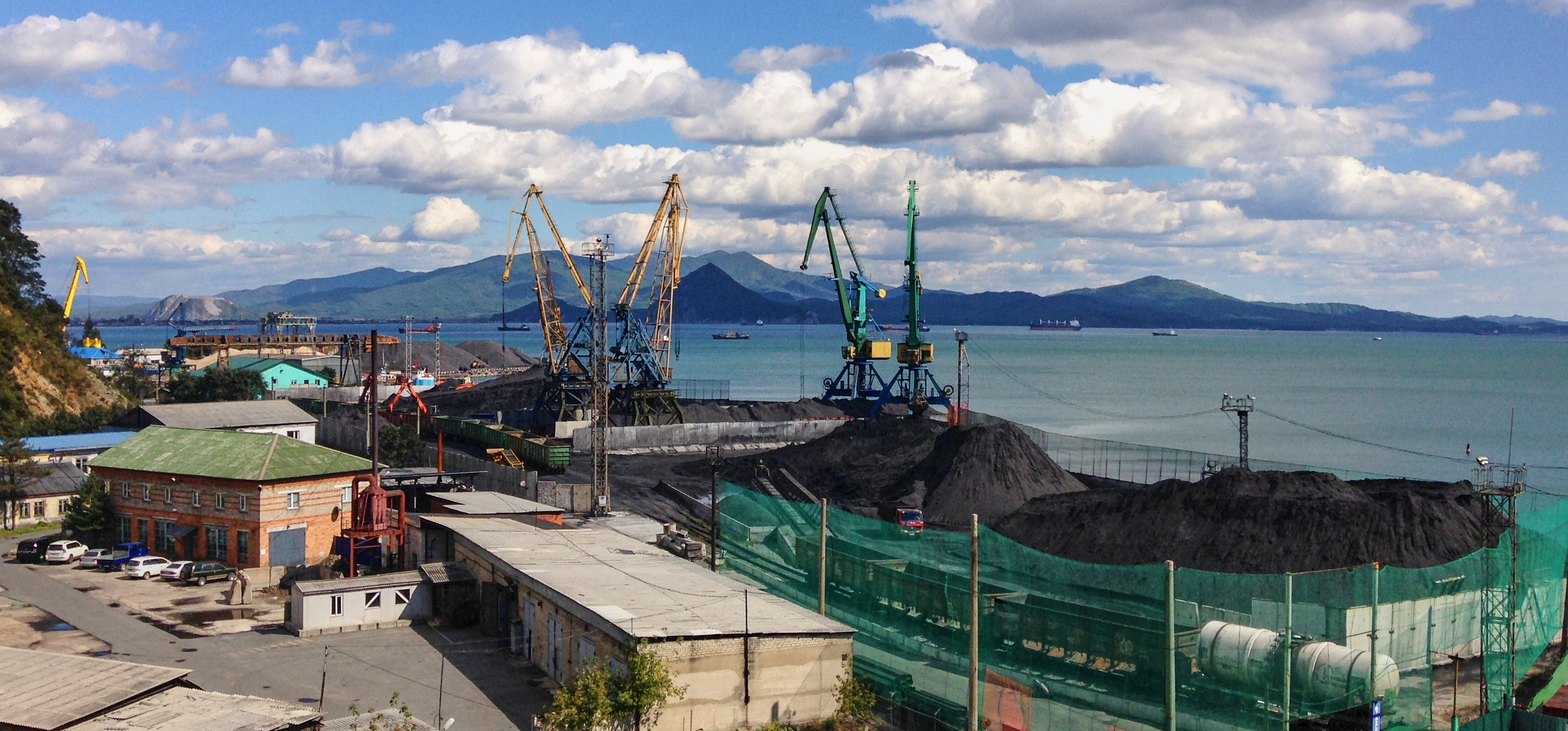
Coal handling with Mount Sestra in the background.

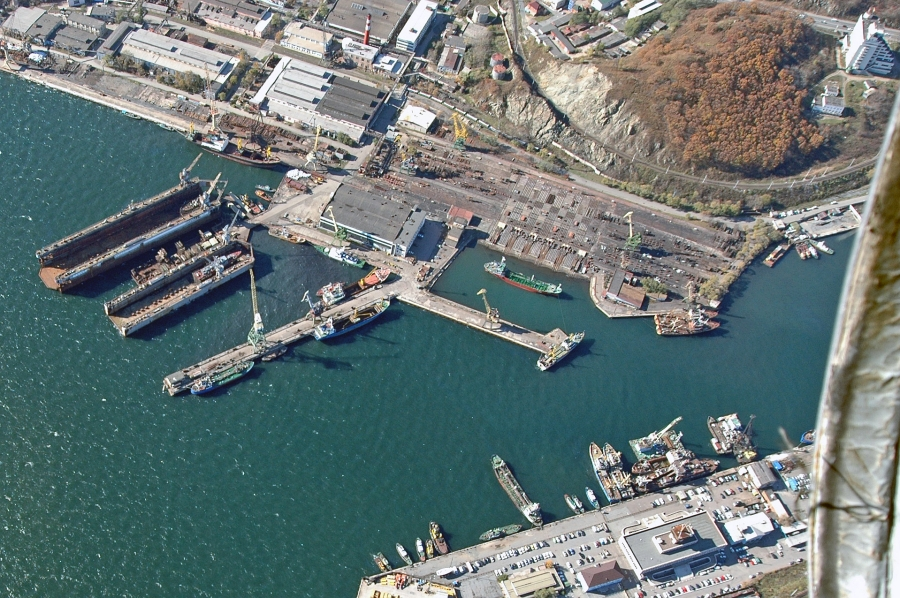
Aerial view of the shipyards and quays.

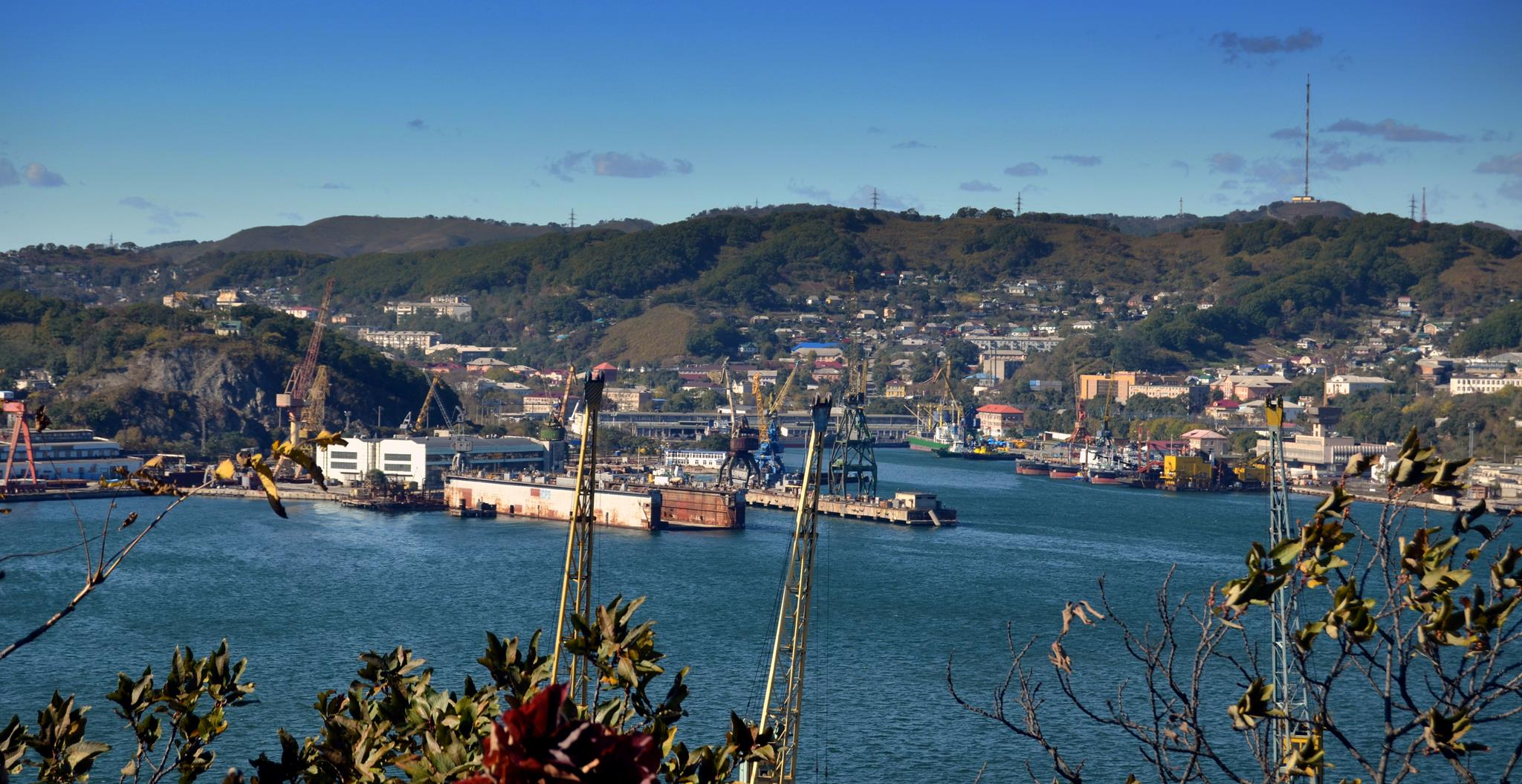
Docks of the ship repair yard and part of the city.

== See also ==
- Vostochny Port
- Nakhodka
- Port of Vladivostok
- Trans-Siberian Railway
- Nakhodka Bay
- Transport in Russia
