= Wales Island =

Wales Island may refer to:

- Wales Island (British Columbia)
- Wales Island (Nunavut)
- Wales Island (Ungava), also part of Nunavut

== See also ==
- Prince of Wales Island (disambiguation)
