= 108th meridian =

108th meridian may refer to:

- 108th meridian east, a line of longitude east of the Greenwich Meridian
- 108th meridian west, a line of longitude west of the Greenwich Meridian

| 108th meridian west | 108th meridian east |
