= 74th meridian west =

Line of longitude

74th meridian west

The meridian 74° west of Greenwich is a line of longitude that extends from the North Pole across the Arctic Ocean, North America, the Atlantic Ocean, the Caribbean Sea, South America, the Pacific Ocean, the Southern Ocean, and Antarctica to the South Pole.

It is the most populous meridian in the Americas and the second most populous west of Greenwich, being home to between 30.3 million and 31.2 million people as of 2019.

In Antarctica, the meridian defines the western limit of the Argentinian territorial claim, and passes through the Chilean and British claims – the three claims overlap.

The 74th meridian west forms a great circle with the 106th meridian east.

== From Pole to Pole ==
Starting at the North Pole and heading south to the South Pole, the 74th meridian west passes through:

Co-ordinates	Country, territory or sea	Notes
90°0′N 74°0′W	Arctic Ocean	
82°56′N 74°0′W	Canada	Nunavut — Ellesmere Island
79°27′N 74°0′W	Nares Strait	
78°0′N 74°0′W	Baffin Bay	
71°44′N 74°0′W	Canada	Nunavut — Baffin Island
68°30′N 74°0′W	Foxe Basin	
68°3′N 74°0′W	Canada	Nunavut — Air Force Island
67°47′N 74°0′W	Foxe Basin	
66°19′N 74°0′W	Canada	Nunavut — Baffin Island
65°50′N 74°0′W	Foxe Basin	
65°30′N 74°0′W	Canada	Nunavut — Baffin Island
64°17′N 74°0′W	Hudson Strait	
62°40′N 74°0′W	Canada	Nunavut — Charles Island
62°24′N 74°0′W	Hudson Strait	
62°22′N 74°0′W	Canada	Quebec – passing through Saint-Jérôme and Lake of Two Mountains
45°0′N 74°0′W	United States	New York; New Jersey — from 41°2′N 74°0′W; New York — Manhattan Island and Long Island, from 40°47′N 74°0′W
40°34′N 74°0′W	Atlantic Ocean	Lower New York Bay
40°28′N 74°0′W	United States	New Jersey
40°13′N 74°0′W	Atlantic Ocean	Passing just east of Crooked Island, Bahamas (at 23°43′N 74°1′W)
22°41′N 74°0′W	Bahamas	Island of Acklins
22°35′N 74°0′W	Atlantic Ocean	Bight of Acklins
22°25′N 74°0′W	Bahamas	Island of Acklins
22°20′N 74°0′W	Atlantic Ocean	Passing just east of Cuba (at 20°12′N 74°8′W)
20°0′N 74°0′W	Caribbean Sea	
18°36′N 74°0′W	Haiti	Tiburon Peninsula, island of Hispaniola
18°10′N 74°0′W	Caribbean Sea	
11°21′N 74°0′W	Colombia	Passing just east of Bogotá (at 4°37′N 74°5′W)
1°7′S 74°0′W	Peru	
16°2′S 74°0′W	Pacific Ocean	
41°47′S 74°0′W	Chile	Chiloé Island
43°24′S 74°0′W	Gulf of Corcovado	
43°47′S 74°0′W	Chile	Chonos Archipelago, Taitao Peninsula (mainland), Merino Jarpa Island, mainland, and several islands in the Patagonic Archipelago
52°42′S 74°0′W	Straits of Magellan	
52°58′S 74°0′W	Chile	Desolación Island
53°11′S 74°0′W	Pacific Ocean	
60°0′S 74°0′W	Southern Ocean	
69°39′S 74°0′W	Antarctica	The western limit of Argentine Antarctica, claimed by Argentina, and passing through Antártica Chilena Province, claimed by Chile, and British Antarctic Territory, claimed by United Kingdom

== See also ==
- 73rd meridian west
- 75th meridian west
