= 109th meridian =

109th meridian may refer to:

- 109th meridian east, a line of longitude east of the Greenwich Meridian
- 109th meridian west, a line of longitude west of the Greenwich Meridian

109th meridian west	109th meridian east
