= 73rd meridian =

73rd meridian may refer to:

- 73rd meridian east, a line of longitude east of the Greenwich Meridian
- 73rd meridian west, a line of longitude west of the Greenwich Meridian

73rd meridian west	73rd meridian east
