= 107th meridian =

107th meridian may refer to:

- 107th meridian east, a line of longitude east of the Greenwich Meridian
- 107th meridian west, a line of longitude west of the Greenwich Meridian

107th meridian west	107th meridian east
