= 107th meridian east =

Line of longitude

107th meridian east (interactive map)

The meridian 107° east of Greenwich is a line of longitude that extends from the North Pole across the Arctic Ocean, Asia, the Indian Ocean, the Southern Ocean, and Antarctica to the South Pole.

The 107th meridian east forms a great circle with the 73rd meridian west.

== From Pole to Pole ==
Starting at the North Pole and heading south to the South Pole, the 107th meridian east passes through:

Co-ordinates	Country, territory or sea	Notes
90°0′N 107°0′E	Arctic Ocean	
79°51′N 107°0′E	Laptev Sea	
78°11′N 107°0′E	Russia	Krasnoyarsk Krai — Maly Taymyr Island, Severnaya Zemlya
78°5′N 107°0′E	Laptev Sea	Passing between the Komsomolskaya Pravda Islands, Krasnoyarsk Krai, Russia (at 77°20′N 107°0′E)
77°0′N 107°0′E	Russia	Krasnoyarsk Krai — Taymyr Peninsula
76°44′N 107°0′E	Faddey Bay	
76°30′N 107°0′E	Russia	Krasnoyarsk Krai — Taymyr Peninsula
73°28′N 107°0′E	Khatanga Gulf	
73°9′N 107°0′E	Russia	Krasnoyarsk Krai; Sakha Republic — from 69°33′N 107°0′E; Krasnoyarsk Krai — from 64°24′N 107°0′E; Irkutsk Oblast — from 63°58′N 107°0′E; Republic of Buryatia — from 52°43′N 107°0′E (border is in Lake Baikal)
50°12′N 107°0′E	Mongolia	Passing just east of Ulaanbaatar (at 47°55′N 106°54′E)
42°19′N 107°0′E	China	Inner Mongolia; Ningxia – from 38°6′N 107°0′E; Gansu – from 37°7′N 107°0′E; Shaanxi – from 35°5′N 107°0′E; Sichuan – from 32°42′N 107°0′E; Chongqing – from 30°3′N 107°0′E; Guizhou – from 28°47′N 107°0′E; Guangxi – from 25°28′N 107°0′E
21°57′N 107°0′E	Vietnam	Mainland and Cat Ba Island
20°44′N 107°0′E	South China Sea	Gulf of Tonkin
17°9′N 107°0′E	Vietnam	
16°18′N 107°0′E	Laos	
14°21′N 107°0′E	Cambodia	
12°5′N 107°0′E	Vietnam	
10°31′N 107°0′E	South China Sea	Passing through the Badas Islands, Indonesia (at 0°37′N 107°0′E); Passing just west of the island of Liat, Indonesia (at 2°53′S 107°1′E); Passing just east of the island of Lepar, Indonesia (at 2°57′S 106°54′E)
2°53′S 107°0′E	Java Sea	
6°0′S 107°0′E	Indonesia	Island of Java - passing just east of Jakarta (at 6°10′S 106°49′E)
7°27′S 107°0′E	Indian Ocean	
60°0′S 107°0′E	Southern Ocean	
66°28′S 107°0′E	Antarctica	Australian Antarctic Territory, claimed by Australia

Next westward: 106th meridian east	107th meridian east forms a great circle with 73rd meridian west	Next eastward: 108th meridian east
