= Prince of Wales Island =

Prince of Wales Island may refer to:

Australia

- Prince of Wales Island (Queensland) one of the Torres Strait Islands in Queensland, Australia

Canada

- Prince of Wales Island (Nunavut), Canada, part of the Arctic Archipelago
- Prince of Wales Island, Lake Nipigon, Ontario

Malaysia

- Penang Island, Malaysia, formerly Prince of Wales Island

USA

- Prince of Wales Island (Alaska), USA
- Prince of Wales Island, Jamaica Bay, New York

== See also ==
- Wales Island (disambiguation)
