= Yunosti Island =

River island in Irkutsk, Russia

Coordinates: 52°17′N 104°18′E

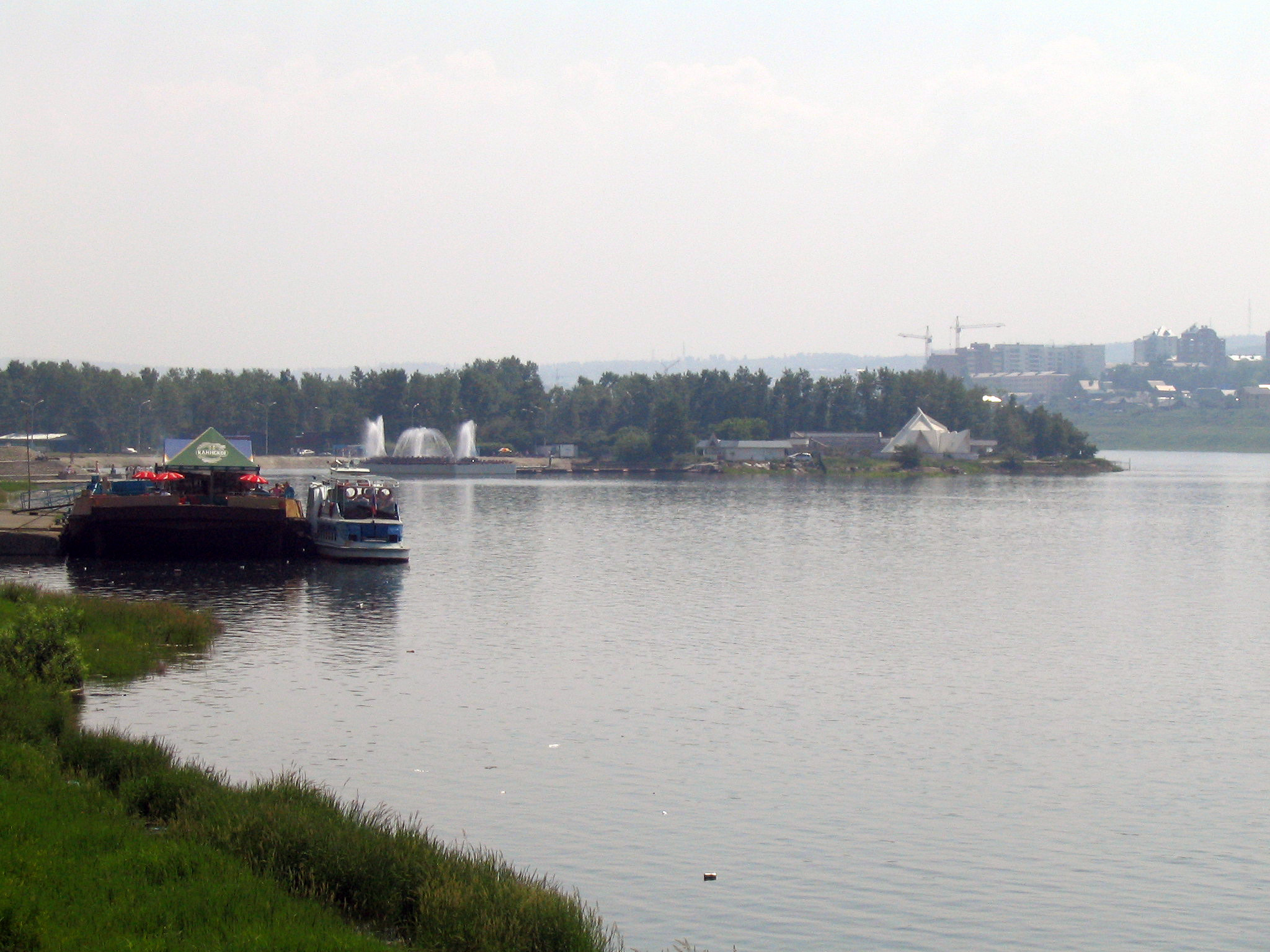
Angara river and Ostrov Yunosti in Irkutsk city

Ostrov Yunosti (Russian: Остров Юность) is a river island in the center of the city of Irkutsk, Russia. This island is covered with woodland and is a popular place for walking. Other attractions include cafes and discos.

A bridge joins the island to the river bank, close to the river fountain and the monument of Alexander III.

== See also ==
- List of islands of Russia
