= Shiashkotan =

Uninhabited island in the Kuril Island chain

Native name: Шиашкотан (Russian); 捨子古丹島 (Japanese)
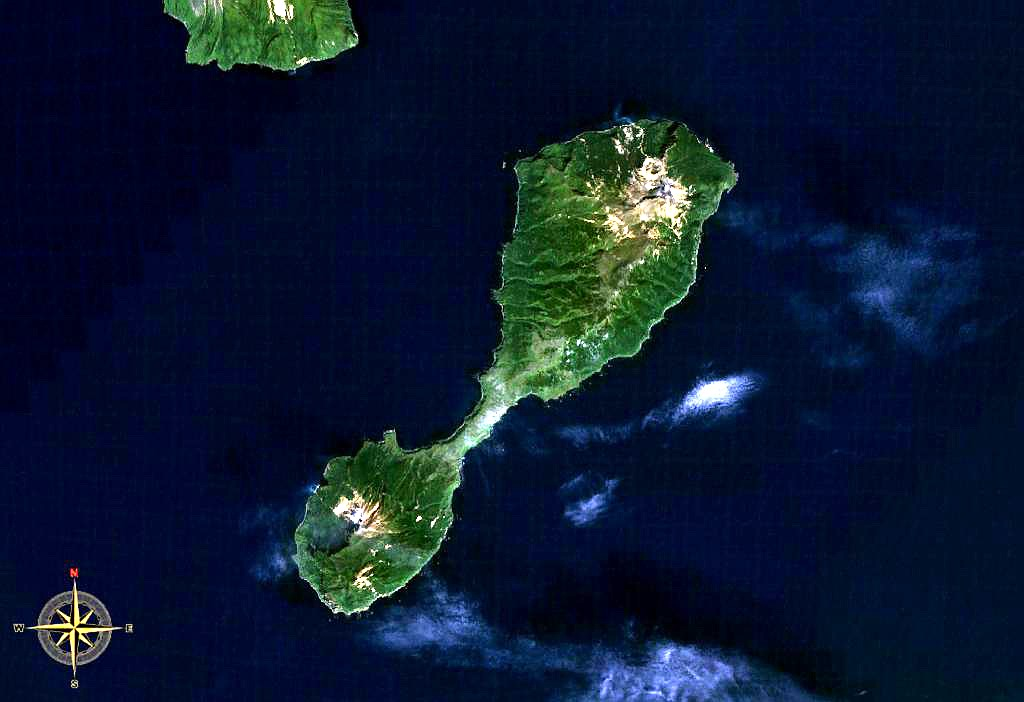
- Landsat view of Shiashkotan Island

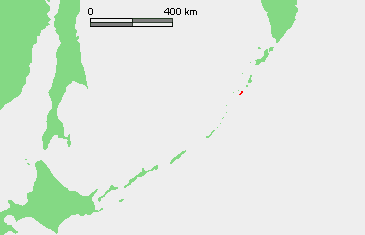

Geography
- Location: Sea of Okhotsk
- Coordinates: 48°49′N 154°6′E
- Archipelago: Kuril Islands
- Area: 122 km^{2} (47 sq mi)
- Highest elevation: 944 m (3097 ft)
- Highest point: Pik Sinarka

Administration
- Russia

Demographics
- Population: 0
- Ethnic groups: Ainu (formerly)

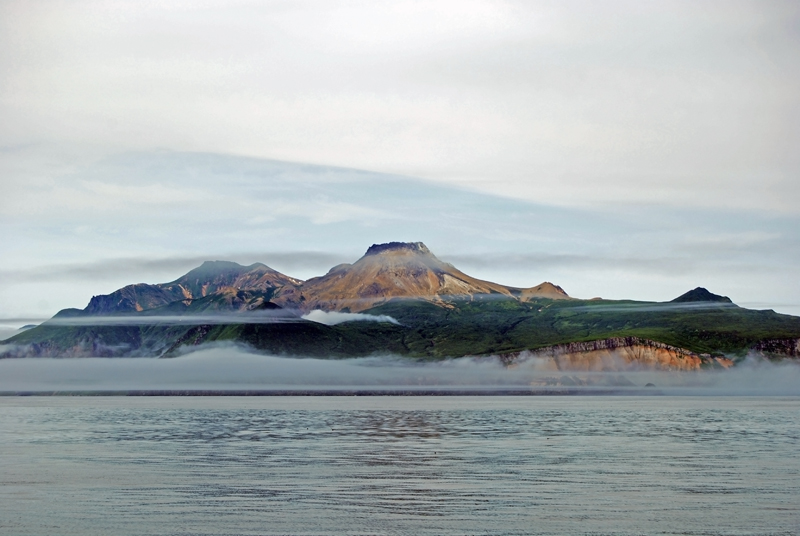
Shiashkotan Island

Shiashkotan (Russian: Шиашкотан; Japanese: 捨子古丹島, romanized: Shasukotan-tō) is an uninhabited volcanic island near the center of the Kuril Islands chain in the Sea of Okhotsk in the northwest Pacific Ocean, separated from Ekarma by the Ekarma Strait. Its name is derived from the Ainu language, from “Konbu village”.

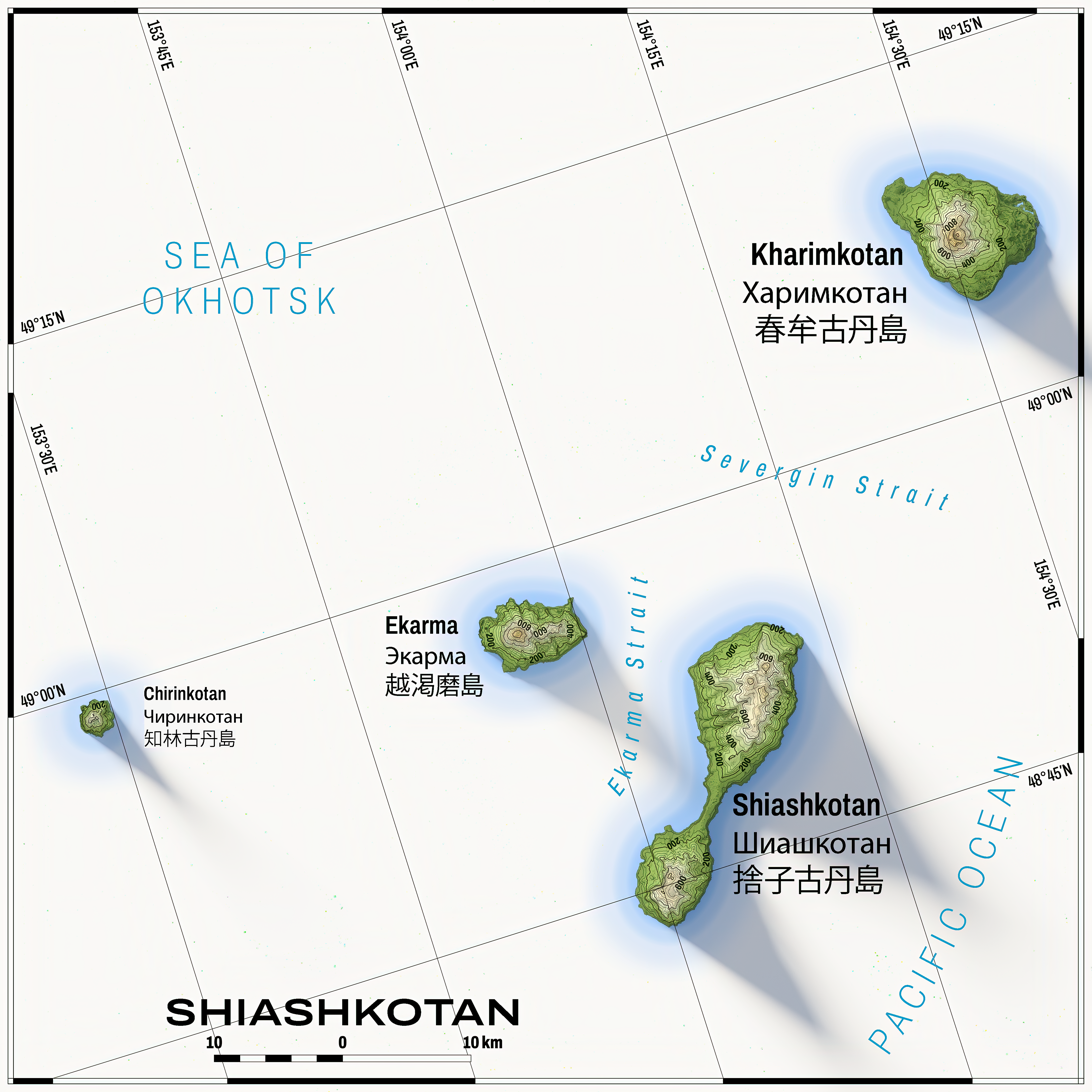
Topographic map of Shiashkotan

== Geology ==
Shiashkotan is roughly dumbbell-shaped, formed by two volcanic islands joined together by a narrow landspit. The island has a total length of 25 kilometres (16 mi) with a width ranging from 9 kilometres (5.6 mi) at its widest point to 0.9 kilometres (0.56 mi) at its narrowest, and an area of 122 square kilometres (47 sq mi). Both ends of the island are complex stratovolcanos, and landing is practical only on the sandy isthmus.

- Pik Sinarka (Russian: влк. Синарка; Japanese: 黒岳; Kurodake), which rises to 934 m (3,064 ft) above sea level occupies the northern end of the island, and is the island’s highest point. Historical eruptions have occurred at Sinarka during 1825–1750, 1846, 1855, and the last and largest from 1872 to 1878. To the east from this volcano is located interesting geothermal field - North-Western solfatara field with more than 100 fumaroles and several hot, geyser-like springs which erupt water up to 1.5 m high.
- Pik Kuntomintar -(Russian: влк.Китаио; Japanese: 北硫黄岳; Kitaiō-dake), occupies the southern end of the island. A central cone fills a 4-4.5 kilometer diameter caldera, and there is a second caldera on the west side which is breached to the west. The only known postglacial activity of Kuntomintar is continuous fulmarole activity near the east wall of the inner caldera and a nearby hot sulfur spring.

== History ==
Shiashkotan was inhabited by the Ainu, who subsisted off of hunting and fishing, at the time of European contact. The island appears on an official map dated 1644, showing the feudal territories of the Matsumae Domain in Edo period Japan; these holdings were confirmed by the Tokugawa shogunate in 1715.

Later claimed by the Empire of Russia, sovereignty passed to Russia under the terms of the 1855 Treaty of Shimoda. During anvolcanic eruption in 1872, Russian authorities recorded that 13 inhabitants died. When the Kuril Islands were returned to the Empire of Japan, per the 1875 Treaty of Saint Petersburg, no inhabitants remained on Shiashkotan, as they moved north to Russian Kamchatka.

The Japanese administered the island as part of Shimushu District of Nemuro Subprefecture of Hokkaidō. In 1893, a settlement was attempted by nine members of the Chishima Protective Society, led by Gunji Shigetada; however, when a ship called on the island a year later, five of the colonists had already died, and the remaining four were critically ill with beri-beri.

After World War II, the island came under the control of the Soviet Union, and is now administered as part of the Sakhalin Oblast of the Russian Federation.

== See also ==
- List of volcanoes in Russia
- List of islands of Russia
