= Ekarma Strait =

Strait in the Sea of Okhotsk

Coordinates: 48°54′49″N 154°03′09″E

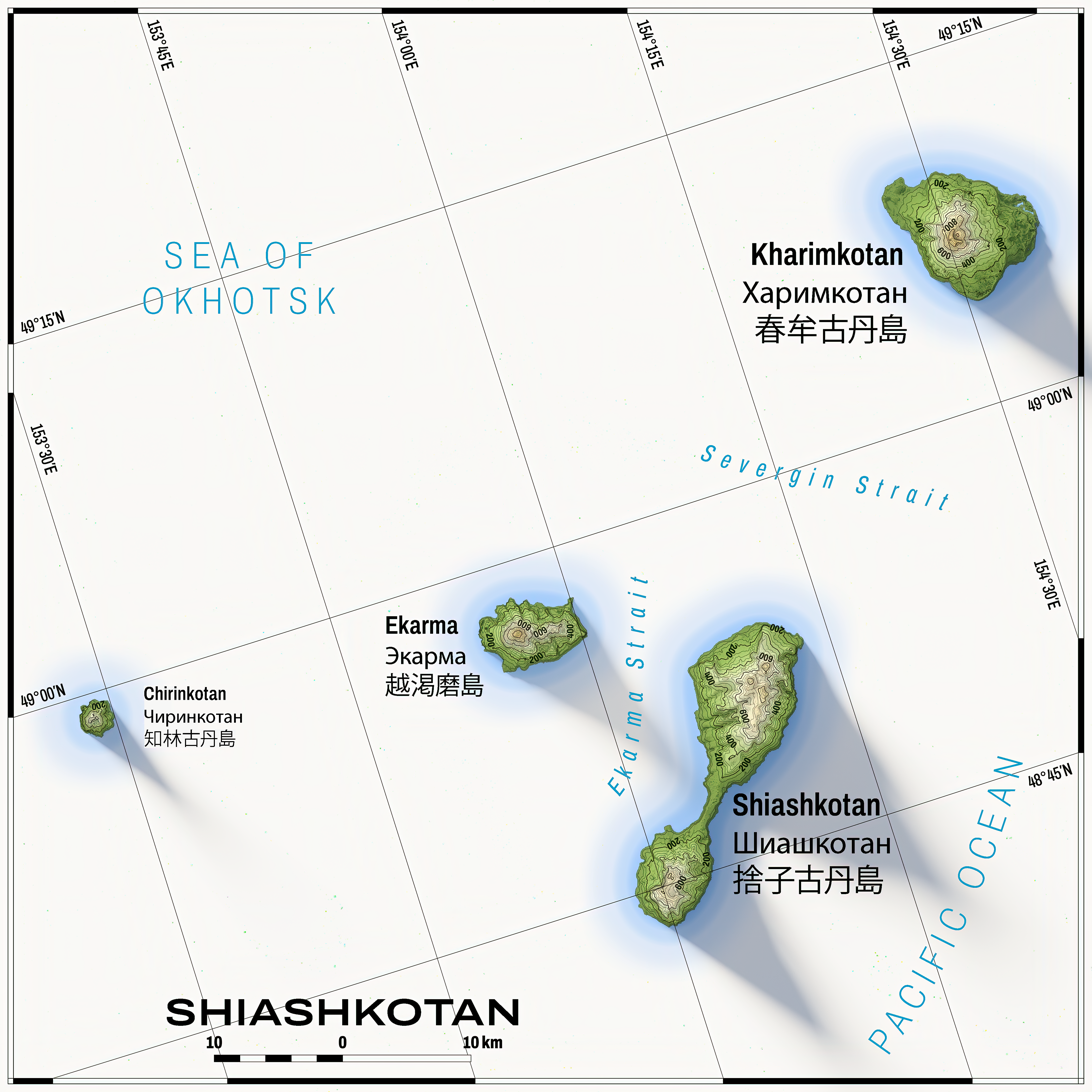
Topographic map of Shiashkotan and nearby islands including Ekarma

Ekarma Strait (Russian: Экарма пролив) is a stretch of water in the Sea of Okhotsk that separates Ekarma at the northwest and Shiashkotan at the southeast. The islands are part of the Kuril Islands chain in the Russian Far East. At its narrowest point, the strait is 8 kilometres (5.0 mi) wide.
