= Starokadomsky Island =

Island in the Laptev Sea, Russian Arctic

Russian: Остров Старокадомского
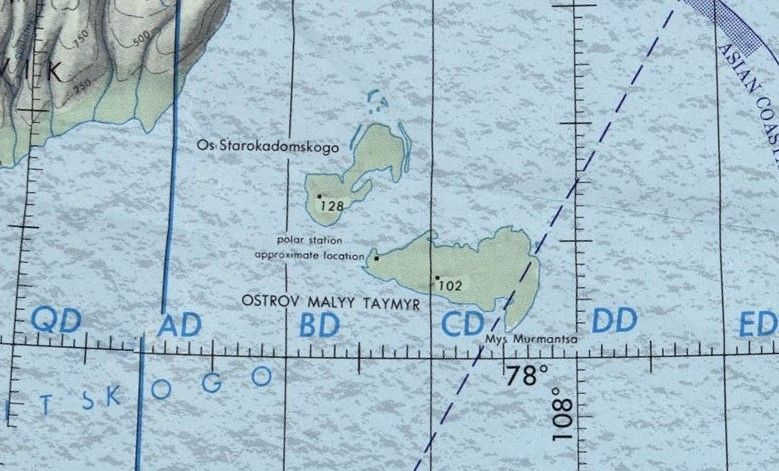
- Starokadomsky and Maly Taymyr Island

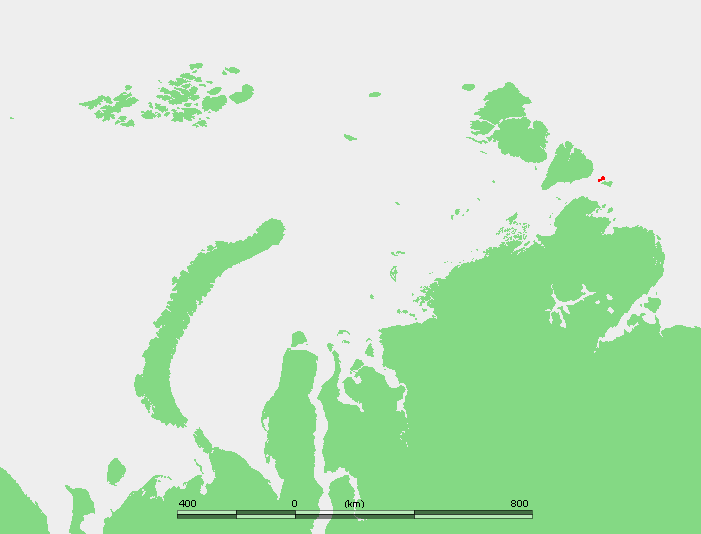
- Location of the island in the Laptev Sea

Geography
- Location: Laptev Sea
- Coordinates: 78°15′N 106°31′E
- Archipelago: Severnaya Zemlya
- Area: 110 km^{2} (42 sq mi)
- Length: 18 km (11.2 mi)
- Width: 7 km (4.3 mi)
- Highest elevation: 39 m (128 ft)

Administration
- Russia

Starokadomsky Island (Russian: Остров Старокадомского; Ostrov Starokadomskogo) is an hourglass-shaped island in the Laptev Sea, Russian Arctic.

== Geography ==
Starokadomsky Island is located off the southeastern end of the Severnaya Zemlya archipelago and northeast of the Taymyr Peninsula. Maly Taymyr Island lies on its southeastern side, separated by a 6 km wide sound.

The maximum length of Starokadomsky Island is 18 km and its maximum width only 7 km. It is surrounded by narrow beach ridges and swales. The small detached islands off Starokadomsky's northern end are known as Mayskiye Ostrova. Ostrov Vesenniy is the easternmost one.

The Vilkitsky Strait runs south of Starokadomsky and Maly Taymyr. Its waters, as well as the waters surrounding the two islands, are covered with pack ice during the long and bitter winters. There are many ice floes even in the short summer, between June and September.

== History ==
Starokadomsky Island was discovered in 1913 by Boris Vilkitsky in the course of the Arctic Ocean Hydrographic Expedition. It was named after Dr. Leonid Starokadomsky, one of the leaders of the Arctic Ocean Hydrographic Expedition.

In present times Starokadomsky Island belongs to the Krasnoyarsk Krai administrative division of the Russian Federation and is part of the Great Arctic State Nature Reserve – the largest nature reserve of Russia and one of the biggest in the world.

== See also ==
- List of islands of Russia
- Severnaya Zemlya§Geography
