= Abdul Rahim Muda =

Malaysian politician

Yang Berbahagia Dato' Abdul Rahim Muda DSAP
- عبدالرحيم مودا

Member of the Pahang State Executive Council (Local Government and Housing)
- In office 15 May 2018 – 28 November 2022
- Monarchs: Ahmad Shah (2018–2019); Abdullah (since 2019)
- Menteri Besar: Wan Rosdy Wan Ismail
- Preceded by: Wan Rosdy Wan Ismail
- Succeeded by: Johari Harun
- Constituency: Lepar

Member of the Pahang State Legislative Assembly for Lepar
- In office 9 May 2018 – 19 November 2022
- Preceded by: Mohd Shohaimi Jusoh (BN–UMNO)
- Succeeded by: Mohd Yazid Mohd Yunus (PN–BERSATU)
- Majority: 2,779 (2018)

Personal details
- Born: 4 March 1965 (age 61) Pahang, Malaysia
- Citizenship: Malaysian
- Party: United Malays National Organisation (UMNO)
- Other political affiliations: Barisan Nasional (BN)
- Occupation: Politician

Yang Berbahagia Dato' Abdul Rahim bin Muda (born 4 March 1965) is a Malaysian politician and has served as Pahang State Executive Councillor.

== Election results ==
Pahang State Legislative Assembly
Year	Constituency	Candidate	Votes	Pct	Opponent(s)	Votes	Pct	Ballots cast	Majority	Turnout
2018	N18 Lepar	Abdul Rahim Muda (UMNO)	6,500	47.14%	Nur Ad-Din Ibrahim (AMANAH)	3,721	26.98%	14,063	2,779	80.00%
2018	N18 Lepar	Abdul Rahim Muda (UMNO)	6,500	47.14%	Mohd Nor Hisam Muhammad (PAS)	3,569	25.88%	14,063	2,779	80.00%
2022	N18 Lepar	Abdul Rahim Muda (UMNO)	8,017	40.65%	Mohd Yazid Mohd Yunus (BERSATU)	8,436	42.77%	20,015	419	77.70%
2022	N18 Lepar	Abdul Rahim Muda (UMNO)	8,017	40.65%	Muhammad Ibrohim Mazalan (AMANAH)	3,166	16.05%	20,015	419	77.70%
2022	N18 Lepar	Abdul Rahim Muda (UMNO)	8,017	40.65%	Rosminahar Mohd Amin (PEJUANG)	103	0.52%	20,015	419	77.70%

== Honours ==
- Pahang
  - Knight Companion of the Order of Sultan Ahmad Shah of Pahang (DSAP) – Dato' (2018)
