= Ekarma =

Uninhabited island in the Kuril Island chain

Native name: Экарма (Russian); 越渇磨島 (Japanese)
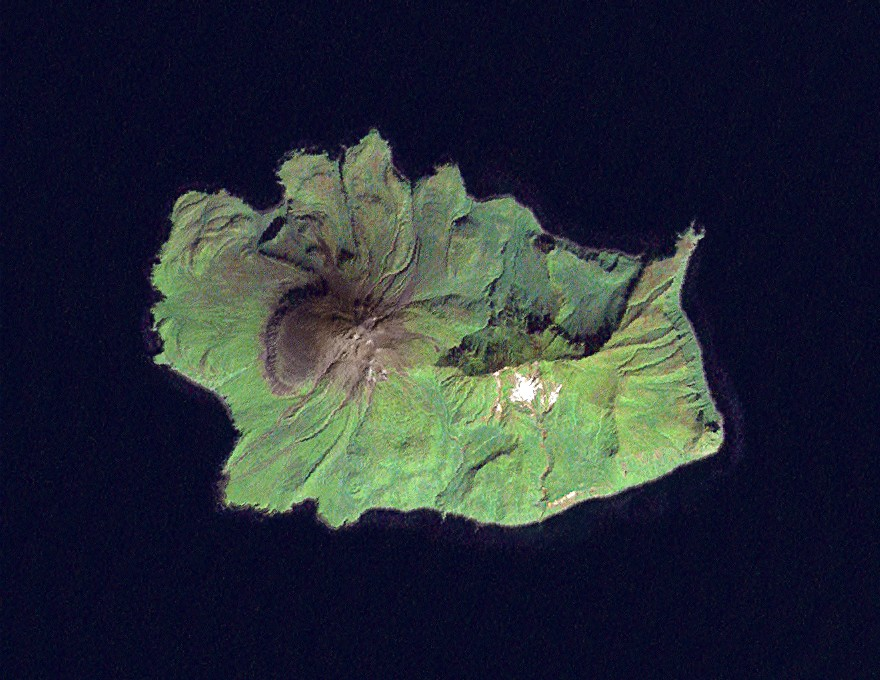
- NASA Landsat view of Ekarma Island
- Interactive map of Ekarma

Geography
- Location: Sea of Okhotsk
- Coordinates: 48.958°N 153.93°E
- Archipelago: Kuril Islands
- Area: 30 km^{2} (12 sq mi)
- Highest elevation: 1,170 m (3840 ft)
- Highest point: Pik Ekarma

Administration
- Russia

Demographics
- Population: 0

Ekarma (Russian: Экарма; Japanese: 越渇磨島, romanized: Ekaruma-tō) is an uninhabited volcanic island near the center of the Kuril Islands chain in the Sea of Okhotsk in the northwest Pacific Ocean, separated from Shiashkotan Island by the Ekarma Strait. Its name is derived from the Ainu language, from “safe anchorage”.

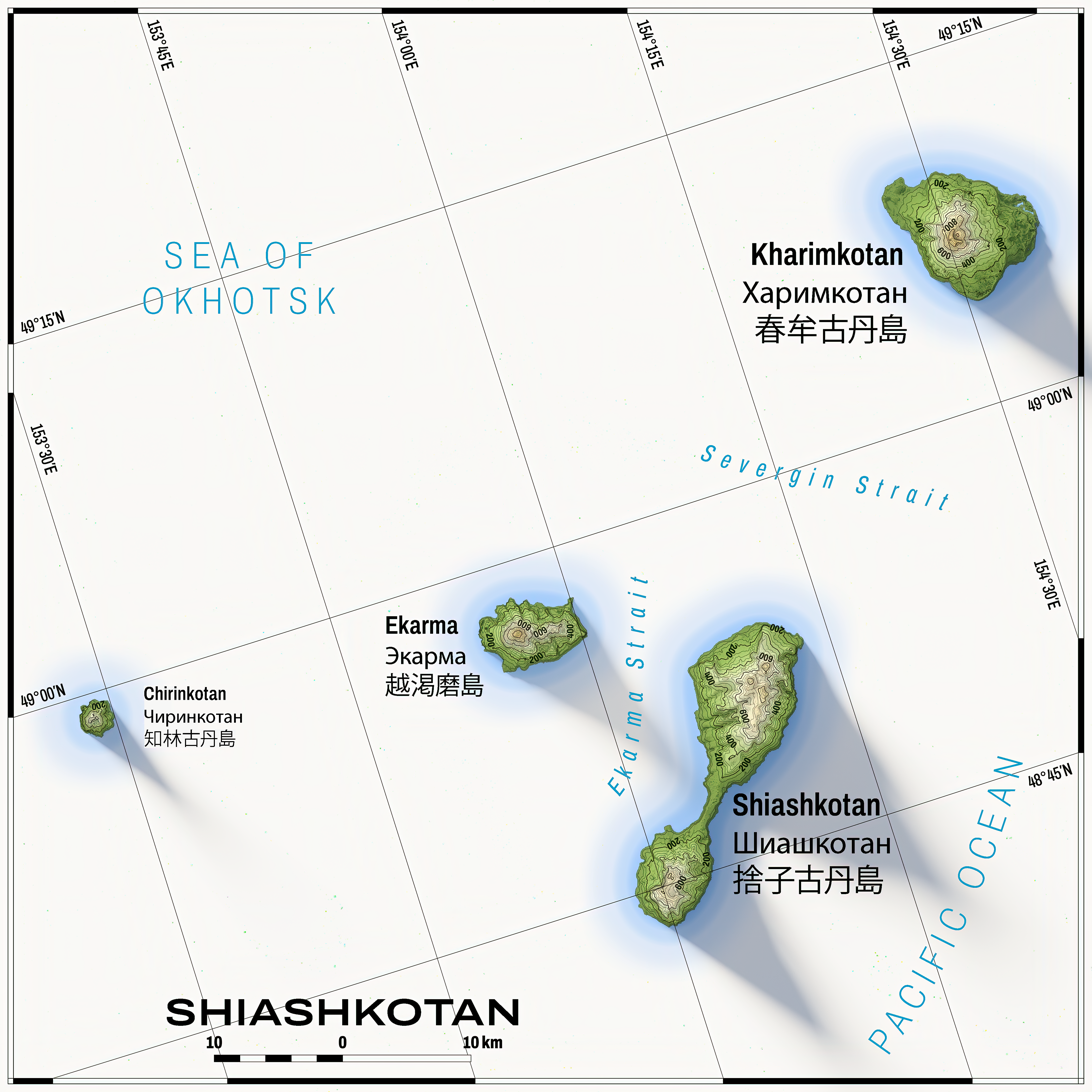
Topographic map of Shiashkotan and nearby islands including Ekarma

== Geology ==
Ekarma is roughly oval, measuring 7.4 kilometres (4.6 mi) by 5.5 kilometres (3.4 mi) with an area of 30 square kilometres (12 sq mi).

The island consists of two overlapping stratovolcano, collectively called Pik Ekarma (Russian: влк.Экарма; Japanese 越渇磨岳; Ekaruma-dake), rising to 1,170 m (3,839 ft) above sea level. Lava flows radiate in all directions from the central peak, forming an uneven shoreline. Numerous hot springs with sulphur deposits can be found on the northern slopes of the mountain. The last eruption of the volcano was in May 1980, during which ash emissions reaching a height of one kilometer were observed from a fishing vessel.

== History ==
Ekarma was visited by hunting and fishing parties of Ainu, but with no sources of fresh water aside from rainfall, was never permanently settled. The island appears on an official map in 1644, showing the feudal territory of the Matsumae Domain in Edo period Japan. These holdings were confirmed by the Tokugawa shogunate in 1744.

Later claimed by the Empire of Russia, sovereignty passed to Russia under the terms of the 1855 Treaty of Shimoda, until the 1875 Treaty of Saint Petersburg returned the Kuril Islands to the Empire of Japan.

The island was administered as part of Shimushu District of Nemuro Subprefecture of Hokkaidō. In 1893, a settlement was attempted by nine members of the Chishima Protective Society led by Gunji Shigetada; however, the colony failed when five of the nine members died in a fishing accident.

After World War II, the island came under the control of the Soviet Union, and is now administered as part of the Sakhalin Oblast of the Russian Federation.

== See also ==
- List of volcanoes in Russia
