= 108th meridian east =

Line of longitude

108th meridian east

The meridian 108° east of Greenwich is a line of longitude that extends from the North Pole across the Arctic Ocean, Asia, the Indian Ocean, the Southern Ocean, and Antarctica to the South Pole.

The 108th meridian east forms a great circle with the 72nd meridian west.

== From Pole to Pole ==
Starting at the North Pole and heading south to the South Pole, the 108th meridian east passes through:

Co-ordinates	Country, territory or sea	Notes
90°0′N 108°0′E	Arctic Ocean	
79°44′N 108°0′E	Laptev Sea	Passing just east of Maly Taymyr Island, Krasnoyarsk Krai, Russia (at 78°7′N 107°45′E); Passing just east of Ostrov Bol'shoy Island, Krasnoyarsk Krai, Russia (at 77°18′N 107°45′E)
76°55′N 108°0′E	Russia	Krasnoyarsk Krai — Taymyr Peninsula
76°54′N 108°0′E	Faddey Bay	
76°31′N 108°0′E	Russia	Krasnoyarsk Krai — Taymyr Peninsula
73°39′N 108°0′E	Khatanga Gulf	
73°12′N 108°0′E	Russia	Krasnoyarsk Krai; Sakha Republic — from 69°43′N 108°0′E; Krasnoyarsk Krai — from 64°11′N 108°0′E; Irkutsk Oblast — from 64°1′N 108°0′E; Republic of Buryatia — from 53°14′N 108°0′E (border is in Lake Baikal); Zabaykalsky Krai — from 50°20′N 108°0′E
49°40′N 108°0′E	Mongolia	
42°26′N 108°0′E	People's Republic of China	Inner Mongolia; Shaanxi – from 37°49′N 108°0′E; Gansu – from 36°38′N 108°0′E; Shaanxi – from 35°16′N 108°0′E; Sichuan – from 32°8′N 108°0′E; Chongqing – from 30°1′N 108°0′E; Guizhou – from 29°2′N 108°0′E; Guangxi – from 25°11′N 108°0′E
21°33′N 108°0′E	Vietnam	Quảng Ninh – for about 10 km
21°27′N 108°0′E	South China Sea	Gulf of Tonkin
16°18′N 108°0′E	Vietnam	Thừa Thiên–Huế; Da Nang – from 16°12′N 108°0′E; Quảng Nam – from 15°55′N 108°0′E; Kon Tum – from 15°0′N 108°0′E; Gia Lai – from 14°15′N 108°0′E; Đắk Lắk – from 13°23′N 108°0′E; Đắk Nông – from 12°18′N 108°0′E; Lâm Đồng – from 12°7′N 108°0′E; Đắk Nông – from 12°3′N 108°0′E; Lâm Đồng – from 11°48′N 108°0′E; Bình Thuận – from 11°20′N 108°0′E
10°42′N 108°0′E	South China Sea	
4°2′N 108°0′E	Indonesia	Island of Natuna Besar
3°56′N 108°0′E	South China Sea	
2°35′S 108°0′E	Indonesia	Island of Belitung
3°15′S 108°0′E	Java Sea	
6°17′S 108°0′E	Indonesia	Island of Java
7°44′S 108°0′E	Indian Ocean	
60°0′S 108°0′E	Southern Ocean	
66°35′S 108°0′E	Antarctica	Australian Antarctic Territory, claimed by Australia

Next westward: 107th meridian east	108th meridian east forms a great circle with 72nd meridian west	Next eastward: 109th meridian east
