= Kuntomintar =

Stratovolcano in the Kuril Islands

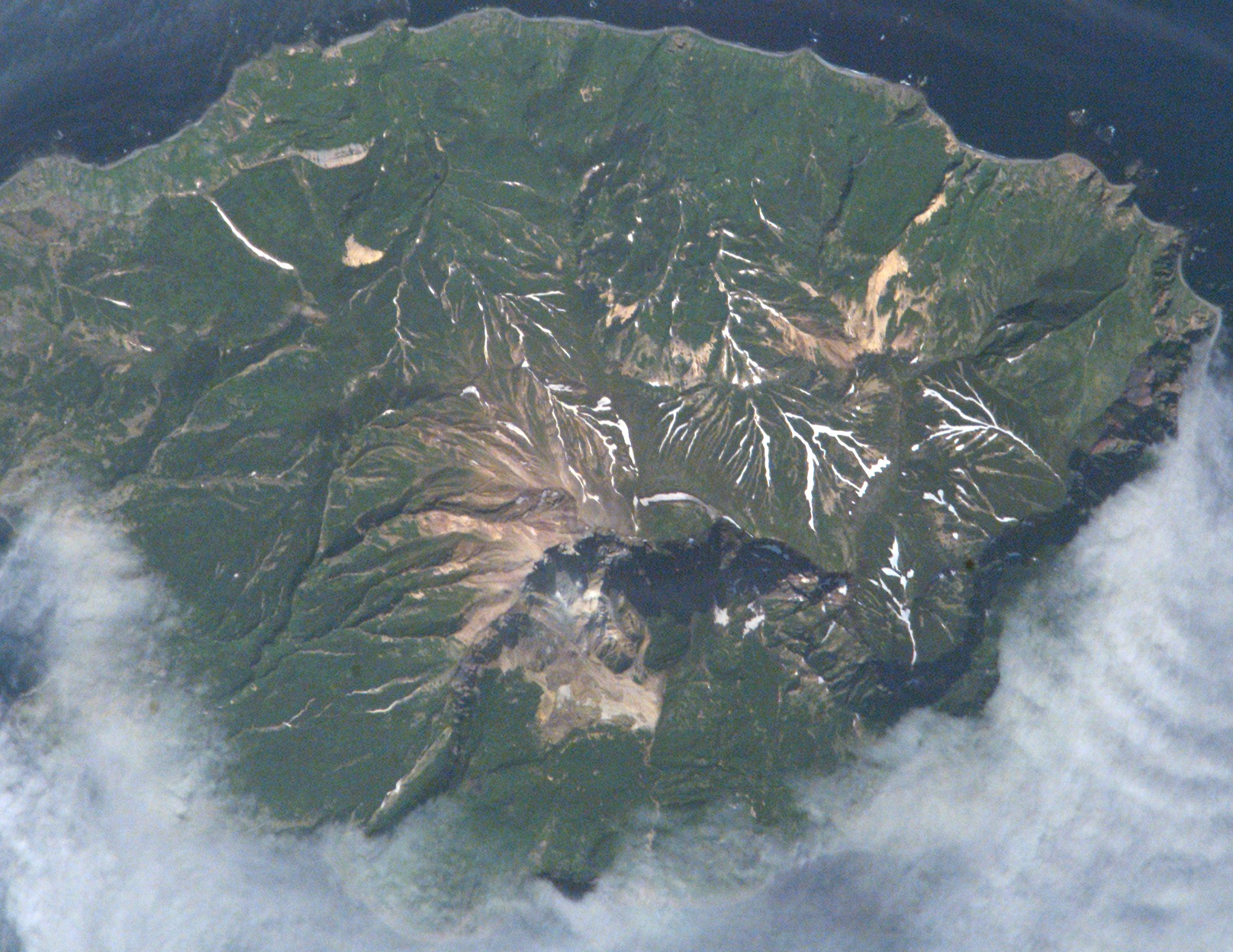

Highest point
- Elevation: 828 m (2,717 ft)
- Coordinates: 48.75°N 154.02°E

Geography
- Location within Far Eastern Federal District
- Location: Shiashkotan, Kuril Islands, Russia

Geology
- Mountain type: Stratovolcano / Hydrothermal field
- Last eruption: Unknown

Climbing
- First ascent: ?
- Easiest route: ?

Kuntomintar (Russian: Кунтоминтар; Japanese: 北硫黄岳; Kitaiō-dake) is a Pleistocene andesitic stratovolcano located at the southern end of Shiashkotan Island, Kuril Islands, Russia. Kumtomintar is a high point on a small volcanic ridge with mellow slopes on all side except the north west side. The mountain is home to many steep drainages, waterfalls, and some small ponds. The volcano consists of a central cone that fills a 4-4.5 km caldera and its crater is at 1280 feet, is below the main peak, on the north west side, some periods of time hot water drains from the crater into the ocean via creek. A second caldera is situated on the west side and is breached to the west.

In 1872, an Ainu village was reportedly destroyed by an eruption, but it was later found to be located near Sinarka volcano (Gorshkov, 1970). Kuntomintar has only exhibited continuous solfataric activity since the postglacial period, originating from the east wall of the inner caldera and a nearby hot sulfur spring.

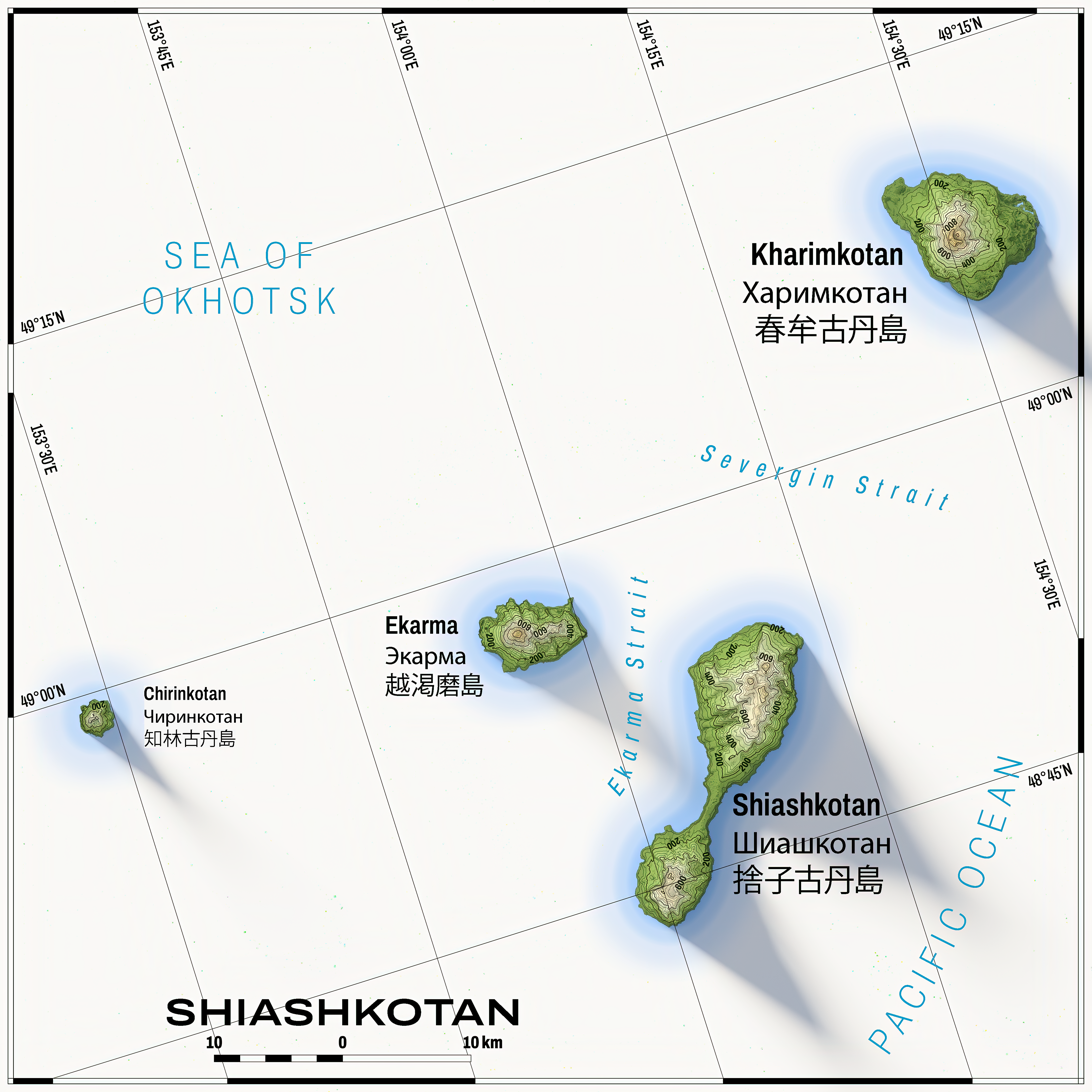
Topographic map of Shiashkotan, with Kuntomintar forming the southern end

== See also ==
- List of volcanoes in Russia
