= 106th meridian east =

Line of longitude

106th meridian east (interactive map)

The meridian 106° east of Greenwich is a line of longitude that extends from the North Pole across the Arctic Ocean, Asia, the Indian Ocean, the Southern Ocean, and Antarctica to the South Pole.

The 106th meridian east is one of the lines of longitude used to measure angular distance east or west of the prime meridian.

The 106th meridian east forms a great circle with the 74th meridian west.

== From Pole to Pole ==
Starting at the North Pole and heading south to the South Pole, the 106th meridian east passes through:

Co-ordinates	Country, territory or sea	Notes
90°0′N 106°0′E	Arctic Ocean	
79°58′N 106°0′E	Laptev Sea	Passing just west of Starokadomsky Island, Krasnoyarsk Krai, Russia (at 77°20′N 106°7′E)
77°26′N 106°0′E	Russia	Krasnoyarsk Krai
77°18′N 106°0′E	Laptev Sea	
77°0′N 106°0′E	Russia	Krasnoyarsk Krai; Sakha Republic — from 67°5′N 106°0′E; Krasnoyarsk Krai — from 66°54′N 106°0′E; Sakha Republic — from 65°4′N 106°0′E; Krasnoyarsk Krai — from 64°32′N 106°0′E; Irkutsk Oblast — from 61°54′N 106°0′E; Republic of Buryatia — from 52°12′N 106°0′E (border is in Lake Baikal)
50°24′N 106°0′E	Mongolia	
42°1′N 106°0′E	China	Inner Mongolia; Ningxia – from 38°56′N 106°0′E; Gansu – for about 5 km from 35°32′N 106°0′E; Ningxia – for about 4 km from 35°29′N 106°0′E; Gansu – from 35°26′N 106°0′E; Shaanxi – from 33°36′N 106°0′E; Sichuan – from 32°50′N 106°0′E; Chongqing – from 30°22′N 106°0′E; Sichuan – from 28°58′N 106°0′E; Guizhou – from 28°44′N 106°0′E; Sichuan – from 28°7′N 106°0′E; Guizhou – from 27°45′N 106°0′E; Guangxi – from 24°39′N 106°0′E; Yunnan – from 24°8′N 106°0′E; Guangxi – from 23°27′N 106°0′E
22°56′N 106°0′E	Vietnam	
19°58′N 106°0′E	South China Sea	Gulf of Tonkin
18°23′N 106°0′E	Vietnam	
17°28′N 106°0′E	Laos	
13°56′N 106°0′E	Cambodia	
11°42′N 106°0′E	Vietnam	
11°11′N 106°0′E	Cambodia	
10°52′N 106°0′E	Vietnam	
9°18′N 106°0′E	South China Sea	Passing through the Anambas Islands, Indonesia (at 3°0′N 106°0′E)
1°35′S 106°0′E	Indonesia	Islands of Bangka and Sumatra
3°18′S 106°0′E	Java Sea	
5°54′S 106°0′E	Indonesia	Island of Java
6°49′S 106°0′E	Indian Ocean	Passing just east of Christmas Island (at 10°26′S 105°43′E)
60°0′S 106°0′E	Southern Ocean	
66°14′S 106°0′E	Antarctica	Australian Antarctic Territory, claimed by Australia

Next westward: 105th meridian east	106th meridian east forms a great circle with 74th meridian west	Next eastward: 107th meridian east
