= 71st meridian west =

Line of longitude

71st meridian west

The meridian 71° west of Greenwich is a line of longitude that extends from the North Pole across the Arctic Ocean, North America, the Atlantic Ocean, the Caribbean Sea, South America, the Pacific Ocean, the Southern Ocean, and Antarctica to the South Pole.

The 71st meridian west forms a great circle with the 109th meridian east.

== From Pole to Pole ==
Starting at the North Pole and heading south to the South Pole, the 71st meridian west passes through:

Co-ordinates	Country, territory or sea	Notes
90°0′N 71°0′W	Arctic Ocean	
83°6′N 71°0′W	Canada	Nunavut – Ellesmere Island
79°50′N 71°0′W	Nares Strait	
78°37′N 71°0′W	Greenland	Inglefield Land
77°46′N 71°0′W	Baffin Bay	
77°28′N 71°0′W	Greenland	Herbert Island
77°22′N 71°0′W	Baffin Bay	
77°9′N 71°0′W	Greenland	
76°58′N 71°0′W	Baffin Bay	
71°3′N 71°0′W	Canada	Nunavut – Baffin Island and Big Island
62°49′N 71°0′W	Hudson Strait	
61°8′N 71°0′W	Canada	Quebec – passing through Île d'Orléans east of Quebec City at 46°57'N
45°21′N 71°0′W	United States	Maine; New Hampshire – from 43°58′N 71°0′W; Massachusetts – from 42°52′N 71°0′W
42°21′N 71°0′W	Atlantic Ocean	Boston Harbor – passing just east of Boston, Massachusetts, United States (at 42°22′N 71°3′W)
42°16′N 71°0′W	United States	Massachusetts
41°31′N 71°0′W	Atlantic Ocean	Passing just west of Cuttyhunk Island, Massachusetts, United States (at 41°25′N 70°57′W); Passing just west of the island of Martha's Vineyard, Massachusetts, United States (at 41°20′N 70°50′W); Passing just east of Grand Turk Island, Turks and Caicos Islands (at 21°30′N 71°7′W)
19°56′N 71°0′W	Dominican Republic	Island of Hispaniola
18°18′N 71°0′W	Caribbean Sea	
11°6′N 71°0′W	Venezuela	
6°59′N 71°0′W	Colombia	
2°17′S 71°0′W	Peru	Passing 4 km west of Moquegua
4°23′S 71°0′W	Brazil	Amazonas; Acre – from 8°0′S 71°0′W
9°49′S 71°0′W	Peru	
17°53′S 71°0′W	Pacific Ocean	
27°41′S 71°0′W	Chile	Passing 1.25 km east of Cerro El Roble Observatory in La Campana National Park
36°29′S 71°0′W	Argentina	
38°21′S 71°0′W	Chile	
38°46′S 71°0′W	Argentina	
52°0′S 71°0′W	Chile	Passing just west of Punta Arenas at 53°10′S 70°56′W
53°48′S 71°0′W	Straits of Magellan	
54°5′S 71°0′W	Chile	Aracena Island, Isla Grande de Tierra del Fuego, Stewart Island and Londonderry Island
54°59′S 71°0′W	Pacific Ocean	
60°0′S 71°0′W	Southern Ocean	
68°52′S 71°0′W	Antarctica	Alexander Island and mainland – claimed by Argentina (Argentine Antarctica), Chile (Antártica Chilena Province) and United Kingdom (British Antarctic Territory)

== See also ==
- 70th meridian west
- 72nd meridian west
