= Sinarka =

Volcano in Russia

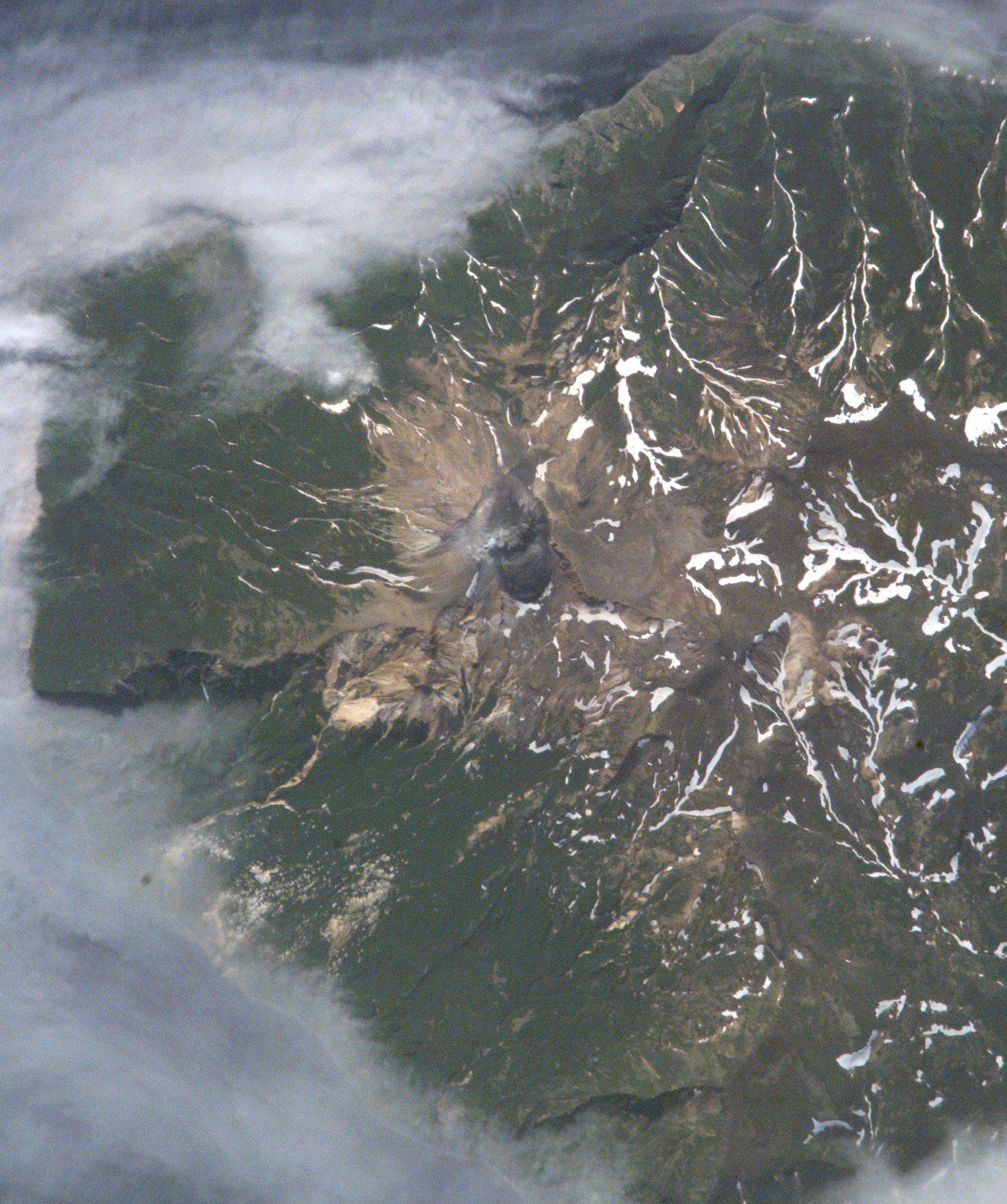
- Satellite view of Sinarka.

Highest point
- Elevation: 934 m (3,064 ft)
- Prominence: 3064
- Coordinates: 48.875°N 154.175°E

Geography
- Location within Far Eastern Federal District
- Location: Shiashkotan, Kuril Islands, Russia

Geology
- Mountain type: Stratovolcano
- Last eruption: 1878

Climbing
- Easiest route: Southwest ridge (?)

Sinarka (Russian: Синарка; Japanese: 黒岳; Kurodake) is a 934 m (3,064 ft) stratovolcano which forms the northern end of Shiashkotan Island, Kuril Islands, Russia, and is the island's highest point. Historical eruptions have occurred at Sinarka during 1825–1750, 1846, 1855, and the last and largest from 1872 to 1878. Recent activity is hydrothermal, from a solfatara field with more than 100 fumaroles and several hot, geyser-like springs which erupt water up to 1.5 m (5 ft) high.

A major eruption would not affect large populations; only three people are located within 10 km (6 mi). The main structure of the volcano consists of the main peak, and two sub-peaks with a mellow ridge descending to the southwest. The larger sub-peak could be considered its own peak, due to its 540 feet (160 m) of prominence.

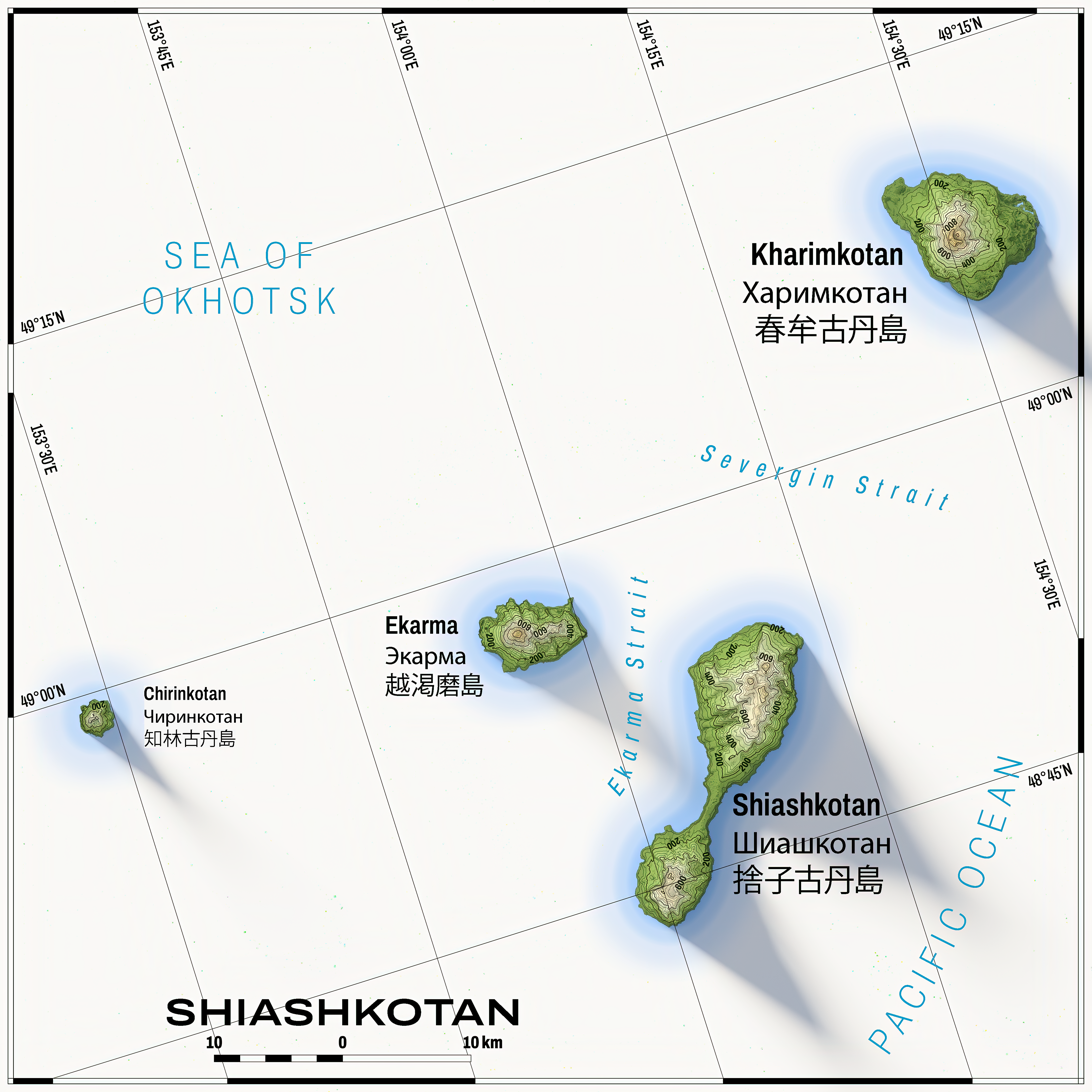
Topographic map of Shiashkotan, with Sinarka forming the northern end

== See also ==
- List of volcanoes in Russia
