= London Island =

Island of Chile

Native name: Isla London
- Location within Chile

Geography
- Coordinates: 54.647896°S 71.987049°W
- Adjacent to: Pacific Ocean

Administration
- Chile
- Region: Magallanes
- Province: Antártica Chilena
- Commune: Cabo de Hornos

Additional information
- NGA UFI=-889705

London Island is located west of Tierra del Fuego and it forms with the Península Brecknock the Paso Brecknock, the only passage between the Canal Ballenero and Canal Cockburn on the way from Beagle Channel to the Straits of Magellan and back.

== See also ==
- List of islands of Chile
