= 73rd meridian west =

Line of longitude

73rd meridian west

The meridian 73° west of Greenwich is a line of longitude that extends from the North Pole across the Arctic Ocean, North America, the Atlantic Ocean, the Caribbean Sea, South America, the Pacific Ocean, the Southern Ocean, and Antarctica to the South Pole.

The 73rd meridian west forms a great circle with the 107th meridian east.

== From Pole to Pole ==
Starting at the North Pole and heading south to the South Pole, the 73rd meridian west passes through:

Co-ordinates	Country, territory or sea	Notes
90°0′N 73°0′W	Arctic Ocean	
83°4′N 73°0′W	Canada	Nunavut – Ellesmere Island
79°45′N 73°0′W	Nares Strait	
78°11′N 73°0′W	Greenland	Cape Alexander
78°9′N 73°0′W	Baffin Bay	Passing just west of Hakluyt Island, Greenland (at 77°26′N 72°48′W); Passing through the Carey Islands, Greenland (at 76°42′N 72°48′W)
71°26′N 73°0′W	Canada	Nunavut – Dexterity Island, Adams Island and Baffin Island
68°13′N 73°0′W	Foxe Basin	
66°43′N 73°0′W	Canada	Nunavut – Baffin Island
64°5′N 73°0′W	Hudson Strait	
62°11′N 73°0′W	Canada	Quebec – passing through the Archipelago of Saint-Pierre Lake
45°1′N 73°0′W	United States	Vermont; Massachusetts – from 42°44′N 73°0′W; Connecticut – from 42°2′N 73°0′W (passing just west of New Haven at 41°18′N 72°55′W)
41°13′N 73°0′W	Long Island Sound	
40°58′N 73°0′W	United States	New York – Long Island
40°41′N 73°0′W	Atlantic Ocean	
22°25′N 73°0′W	Bahamas	Island of Mayaguana
22°22′N 73°0′W	Atlantic Ocean	
21°33′N 73°0′W	Bahamas	Island of Little Inagua
21°27′N 73°0′W	Atlantic Ocean	Passing just east of the island of Great Inagua, Bahamas (at 21°18′N 73°0′W); Passing just west of the island of Tortuga, Haiti (at 20°3′N 72°58′W)
19°55′N 73°0′W	Haiti	Island of Hispaniola
19°36′N 73°0′W	Caribbean Sea	Gulf of Gonâve
18°54′N 73°0′W	Haiti	Gonâve Island
18°45′N 73°0′W	Caribbean Sea	Gulf of Gonâve
18°28′N 73°0′W	Haiti	Island of Hispaniola – Tiburon Peninsula
18°11′N 73°0′W	Caribbean Sea	
11°30′N 73°0′W	Colombia	
9°46′N 73°0′W	Venezuela	
9°17′N 73°0′W	Colombia	
2°23′S 73°0′W	Peru	
5°44′S 73°0′W	Brazil	Amazonas; Acre – from 7°28′S 73°0′W
8°56′S 73°0′W	Peru	
9°10′S 73°0′W	Brazil	Acre
9°25′S 73°0′W	Peru	
16°31′S 73°0′W	Pacific Ocean	
36°44′S 73°0′W	Chile	Passing just east of Concepción
41°30′S 73°0′W	Gulf of Ancud	
42°15′S 73°0′W	Gulf of Corcovado	
43°17′S 73°0′W	Chile	Mainland, Magdalena Island, and the mainland again
49°1′S 73°0′W	Argentina	
50°46′S 73°0′W	Chile	Mainland, Riesco Island and Santa Inés Island
54°5′S 73°0′W	Pacific Ocean	
54°28′S 73°0′W	Chile	Noir Island
54°29′S 73°0′W	Pacific Ocean	
60°0′S 73°0′W	Southern Ocean	
69°40′S 73°0′W	Antarctica	Alexander Island and mainland – claimed by Argentina, Chile and United Kingdom

== See also ==
- 72nd meridian west
- 74th meridian west
