= Lepar =

Political subdivision in Malaysia

Lepar (N18)
Pahang constituency

State constituency
- Legislature: Pahang State Legislative Assembly
MLA
Mohd Yazid Mohd Yunus
PN
- Constituency created: 1994
- First contested: 1995
- Last contested: 2022

Demographics
- Electors (2022): 25,278

Lepar is a state constituency in Pahang, Malaysia, that is represented in the Pahang State Legislative Assembly.

== Demographics ==
Ethnic breakdown of Lepar's electorate as of 2022
1. Malay (80.7%)
2. Chinese (13.2%)
3. Other ethnicities (3.73%)
4. Indian (2.32%)

== History ==
=== Polling districts ===
According to the federal gazette issued on 30 October 2022, the Lepar constituency is divided into 9 polling districts.

State constituency	Polling districts	Code	Location
Lepar (N18)	Mahkota Jaya	084/18/01	SK Seri Mahkota; SA Rakyat (KAFA) Nurul Aman
Lepar (N18)	Seri Fajar	084/18/02	SK Gambang
Lepar (N18)	Gambang	084/18/03	SJK (C) Gambang
Lepar (N18)	Jalan Besar	084/18/04	Dewan Orang Ramai Gambang
Lepar (N18)	FELDA Lepar Hilir Satu	084/18/05	SK LKTP Lepar Hilir 1
Lepar (N18)	FELDA Lepar Hilir Dua	084/18/06	SK LKTP Lepar Hilir 2
Lepar (N18)	FELDA Lepar Hilir Tiga	084/18/07	SK LKTP Lepar Hilir 3
Lepar (N18)	Paya Bungor	084/18/08	SK Paya Bungor
Lepar (N18)	FELDA Lepar Utara Satu	084/18/09	SMK Lepar Utara

=== Representation history ===
Members of the Legislative Assembly for Lepar
Assembly	No	Years	Name	Party
Constituency created from Luit and Paya Besar
9th	N16	1995-1999	Mohd Khalil Yaakob	BN (UMNO)
10th	N16	1999-2004	Ahmad Tajuddin Sulaiman	BN (UMNO)
11th	N18	2004-2008	Ahmad Tajuddin Sulaiman	BN (UMNO)
12th	N18	2008-2013	Mohd Shohaimi Jusoh	BN (UMNO)
13th	N18	2013-2017	Mohd Shohaimi Jusoh	BN (UMNO)
13th	N18	2017-2018	Vacant	
14th	N18	2018-2022	Abdul Rahim Muda	BN (UMNO)
15th	N18	2022–present	Mohd Yazid Mohd Yunus	PN (BERSATU)

== Election results ==
Pahang state election, 2022: Lepar
Party	Candidate	Votes	%	∆%
PN	Mohd Yazid Mohd Yunus	8,436	42.77	▲42.77
BN	Abdul Rahim Muda	8,017	40.65	▼6.49
PH	Muhammad Ibrohim Mazalan	3,166	16.05	▲16.05
PEJUANG	Rosminahar Mohd Amin	103	0.52	▲0.52
Total valid votes		19,722	100.00	
Total rejected ballots		256		
Unreturned ballots		38		
Turnout		20,016	77.80	▼2.19
Registered electors		25,728		
Majority		419	2.12	▼18.03
PN gain from BN		Swing		?

Pahang state election, 2018: Lepar
Party	Candidate	Votes	%	∆%
BN	Abd Rahim Muda	6,500	47.14	▼17.59
PKR	Nur Ad-din Ibrahim	3,721	26.98	▼7.77
PAS	Mohd Nor Hisam Muhammad	3,569	25.88	▲25.88
Total valid votes		13,790	100.00	
Total rejected ballots		238		
Unreturned ballots		35		
Turnout		14,063	79.99	▼4.00
Registered electors		17,582		
Majority		2,779	20.15	▼9.83
BN hold		Swing		

Pahang state election, 2013: Lepar
Party	Candidate	Votes	%	∆%
BN	Mohd Shohaimi Jusoh	8,022	64.73	▼8.60
PKR	Jefri Jaafar Tukemin	4,306	34.75	▲8.07
Independent	Kamarzaman Mohamed Yunus	65	0.52	▲0.52
Total valid votes		12,393	100.00	
Total rejected ballots		219		
Unreturned ballots		23		
Turnout		12,635	83.99	▲7.57
Registered electors		15,044		
Majority		3,716	29.98	▼16.67
BN hold		Swing		

Pahang state election, 2008: Lepar
Party	Candidate	Votes	%	∆%
BN	Mohd Shohaimi Jusoh	6,543	73.33	▼5.73
PKR	Khazizi Ahmad	2,380	26.67	▲26.67
Total valid votes		8,923	100.00	
Total rejected ballots		142		
Unreturned ballots		11		
Turnout		9,076	76.42	▼1.01
Registered electors		11,877		
Majority		4,163	46.65	▼11.46
BN hold		Swing		

Pahang state election, 2004: Lepar
Party	Candidate	Votes	%	∆%
BN	Ahmad Tajuddin Sulaiman	6,677	79.06	▲11.77
PAS	Rosli Abdul Jabar	1,769	20.94	▲20.94
Total valid votes		8,446	100.00	
Total rejected ballots		136		
Unreturned ballots		20		
Turnout		8,602	77.43	▼7.26
Registered electors		11,110		
Majority		4,908	58.11	▲23.54
BN hold		Swing		

Pahang state election, 1999: Lepar
Party	Candidate	Votes	%	∆%
BN	Ahmad Tajuddin Sulaiman	8,126	67.28	▼15.86
DAP	Abu Bakar Lebai Sudin	3,951	32.72	▲32.72
Total valid votes		12,077	100.00	
Total rejected ballots		901		
Unreturned ballots		2,783		
Turnout		15,761	84.69	▼0.63
Registered electors		18,611		
Majority		4,175	34.57	▼31.71
BN hold		Swing		

Pahang state election, 1995: Lepar
Party	Candidate	Votes	%
BN	Mohamed Khalil Yaakob	10,035	83.14
S46	Abd Razak Hassan	2,035	16.86
Total valid votes		12,070	100.00
Total rejected ballots		747	
Unreturned ballots		1,367	
Turnout		14,184	85.31
Registered electors		16,626	
Majority		8,000	66.28
This was a new constituency created.
