= Lisy Island =

Island in Nakhodka Bay, Russia

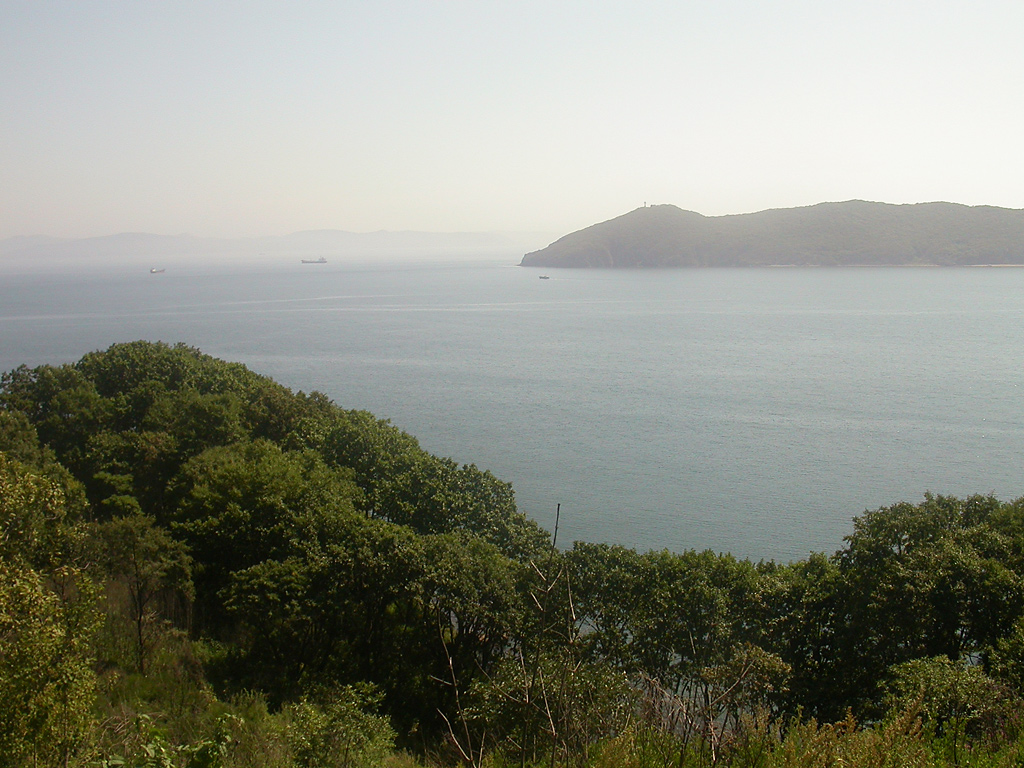

Geography
- Coordinates: 42°45′39″N 132°54′25″E

Lisy Island (Russian - Лисий остров, means Fox's Island) is a small uninhabited island near the city of Nakhodka in Nakhodka Bay (Japan Sea).

Lisy Island protects Bay (especially West part of Gulf) from open sea waves.

Lisy Island is near one kilometre from Nakhodka Oil Port.

== History ==
Lisiy Island is the remnant of an ancient submerged mountain range, which separated from the mainland as a result of the general subsidence of the land and the advance of the sea during the formation of the shelf of the Peter the Great Gulf. According to geological data, it was formed 10-12 thousand years ago by separation from the Trudny Peninsula. The island is a kind of “splinter” of rocks, cut off from its continental part of the Trudny Peninsula.
