= 109th meridian east =

Line of longitude

109th meridian east (interactive map)

The meridian 109° east of Greenwich is a line of longitude that extends from the North Pole across the Arctic Ocean, Asia, the Indian Ocean, the Southern Ocean, and Antarctica to the South Pole.

The 109th meridian east forms a great circle with the 71st meridian west.

== From Pole to Pole ==
Starting at the North Pole and heading south to the South Pole, the 109th meridian east passes through:

Co-ordinates	Country, territory or sea	Notes
90°0′N 109°0′E	Arctic Ocean	
79°37′N 109°0′E	Laptev Sea	
76°44′N 109°0′E	Russia	Krasnoyarsk Krai — Taymyr Peninsula
74°0′N 109°0′E	Khatanga Gulf	
73°21′N 109°0′E	Russia	Krasnoyarsk Krai; Sakha Republic — from 69°46′N 109°0′E; Irkutsk Oblast — from 63°35′N 109°0′E; Republic of Buryatia — from 56°39′N 109°0′E; Irkutsk Oblast — from 56°1′N 109°0′E; Republic of Buryatia — from 55°56′N 109°0′E, passing through Lake Baikal; Zabaykalsky Krai — from 51°27′N 109°0′E
49°21′N 109°0′E	Mongolia	
42°27′N 109°0′E	China	Inner Mongolia; Shaanxi – from 38°20′N 109°0′E; Inner Mongolia – from 38°8′N 109°0′E; Shaanxi – from 37°53′N 109°0′E, passing just east of Xi'an (at 34°15′N 108°56′E); Chongqing – from 31°55′N 109°0′E; Hubei – from 30°37′N 109°0′E; Chongqing – from 29°19′N 109°0′E; Guizhou – from 28°9′N 109°0′E; Hunan – from 27°14′N 109°0′E; Guizhou – from 27°4′N 109°0′E; Guangxi – from 25°46′N 109°0′E; Guizhou – from 25°42′N 109°0′E; Guangxi – from 25°31′N 109°0′E
21°37′N 109°0′E	South China Sea	Gulf of Tonkin – passing just west of Weizhou Island, China (at 21°2′N 109°4′E)
19°34′N 109°0′E	China	Island of Hainan
18°22′N 109°0′E	South China Sea	
14°49′N 109°0′E	Vietnam	Quảng Ngãi; Bình Định – from 14°40′N 109°0′E; Phú Yên – from 13°31′N 109°0′E; Khánh Hòa – from 12°42′N 109°0′E; Ninh Thuận – from 11°55′N 109°0′E
11°20′N 109°0′E	South China Sea	Passing just east of the island of Cù Lao Thu, Vietnam (at 10°31′N 108°57′E)
2°34′N 109°0′E	Indonesia	Island of Serasan
2°32′N 109°0′E	South China Sea	
1°17′N 109°0′E	Indonesia	West Kalimantan, on the island of Borneo
0°18′N 109°0′E	South China Sea	Passing just east of the island of Karimata, Indonesia (at 1°36′S 108°58′E)
2°50′S 109°0′E	Java Sea	
6°48′S 109°0′E	Indonesia	Islands of Java and Kambangan Island
7°46′S 109°0′E	Indian Ocean	
60°0′S 109°0′E	Southern Ocean	
66°53′S 109°0′E	Antarctica	Australian Antarctic Territory, claimed by Australia

Next westward: 108th meridian east	109th meridian east forms a great circle with 71st meridian west	Next eastward: 110th meridian east
