= Charles Island (Nunavut) =

Island in Nunavut, Canada

- Location within Nunavut Location within Canada

Geography
- Location: Hudson Strait
- Coordinates: 62°38.463′N 74°18.009′W
- Archipelago: Arctic Archipelago
- Total islands: 1
- Area: 235 km^{2} (91 sq mi)
- Highest point: 152 ft

Administration
- Canada
- Territory: Nunavut
- Region: Qikiqtaaluk

Demographics
- Population: Uninhabited

Charles Island is an Arctic island in the Qikiqtaaluk Region, Nunavut, Canada. It is located within Hudson Strait, an arm of Hudson Bay. Charles Bay is on the north side of Charles Island. Cap de Nouvelle-France, on the Ungava Peninsula of Quebec, is directly southeast of the island.
