= Yaya Island =

Islet

Coordinates: 73°59′25.2″N 133°5′28.1″E

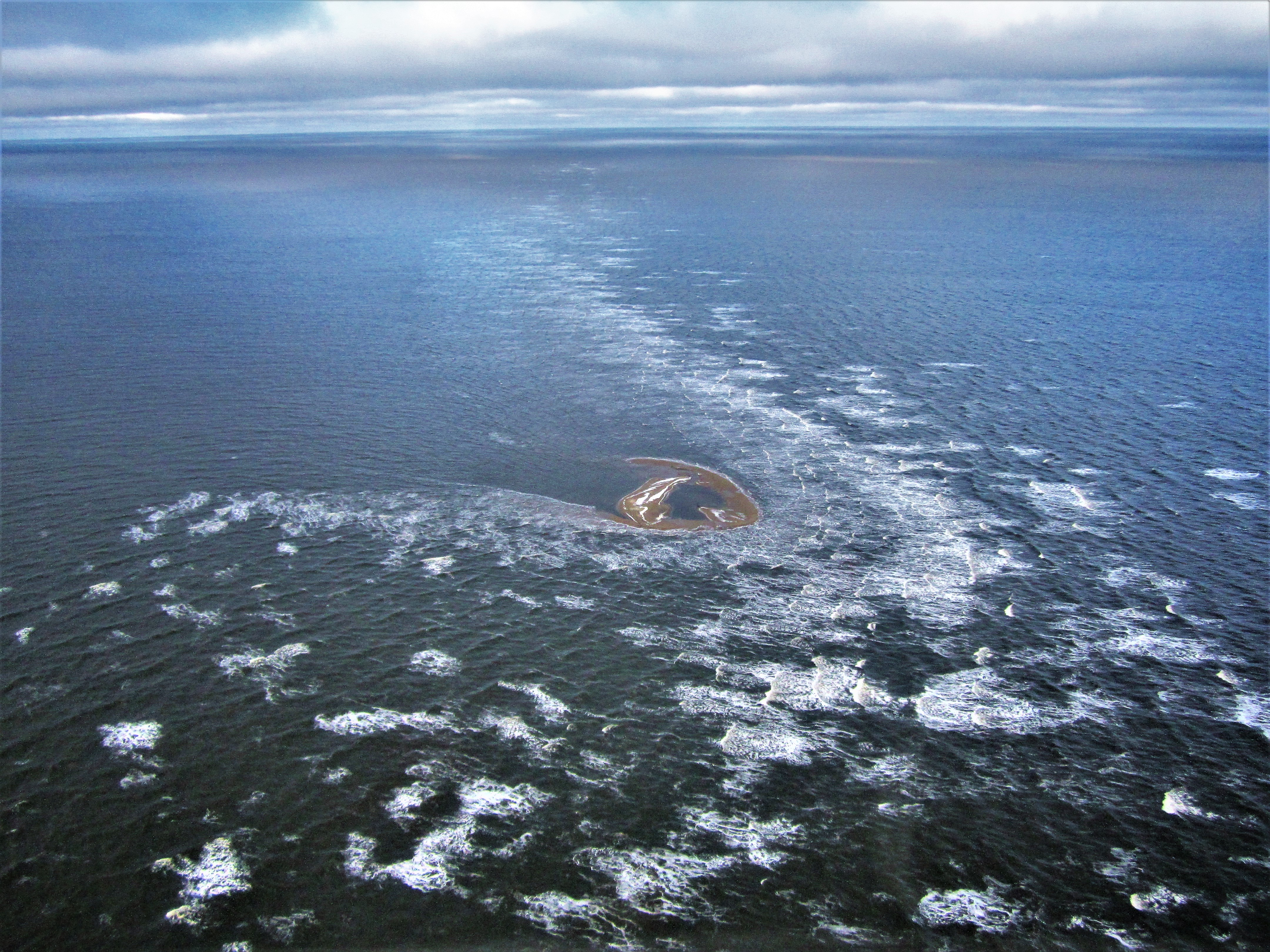
Aerial photo of Yaya

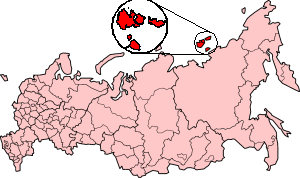
Location of the New Siberian Islands within Russia

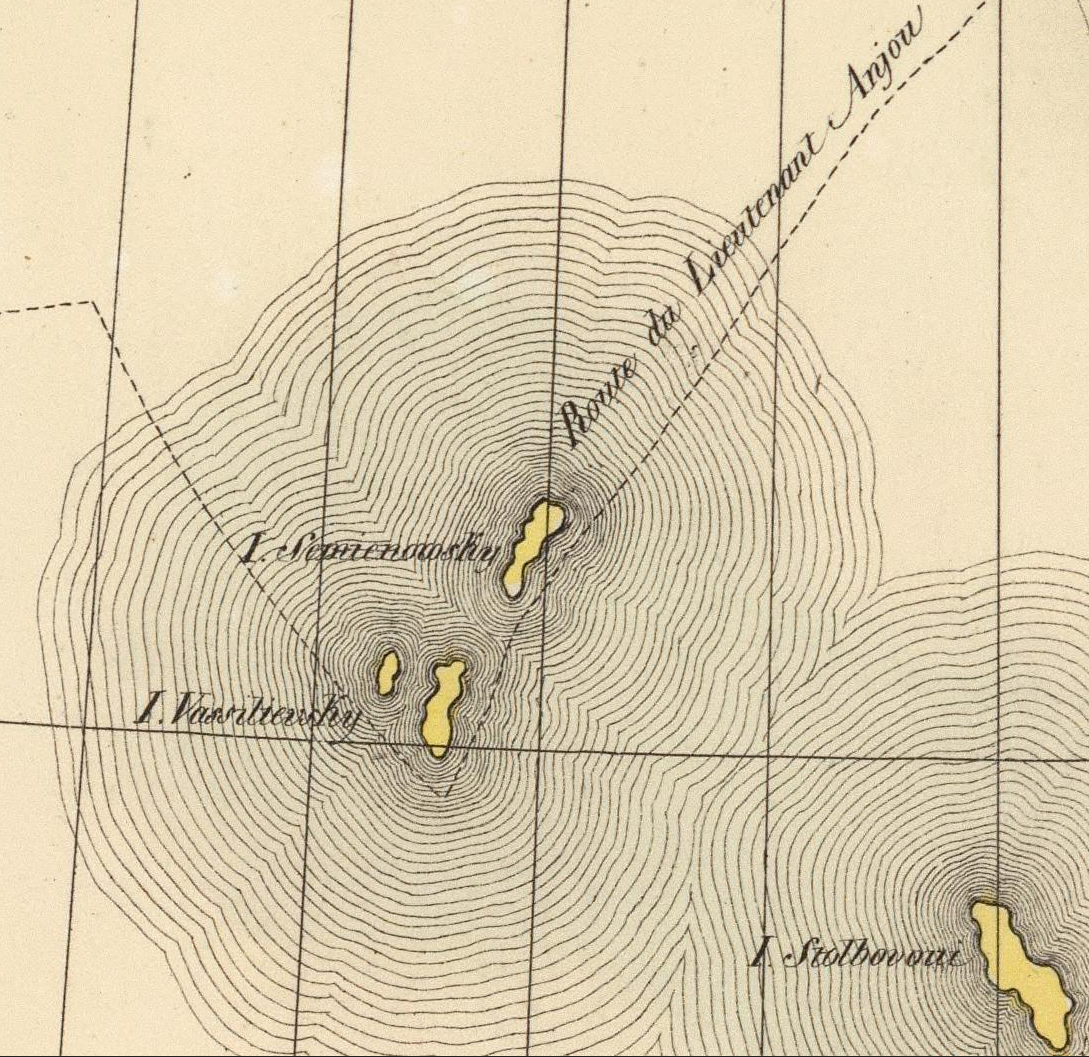
Semyonovsky and Vasilyevsky Islands, Former site of where Yaya is

Yaya (Russian: Яя) is a sandy islet in Russia, in the New Siberian Islands, Laptev Sea. Its length is about 370 metres and is 125 metres wide. Discovered in 2013, it expanded the Russian maritime exclusive economic zone by 452 square kilometers.

== Discovery ==
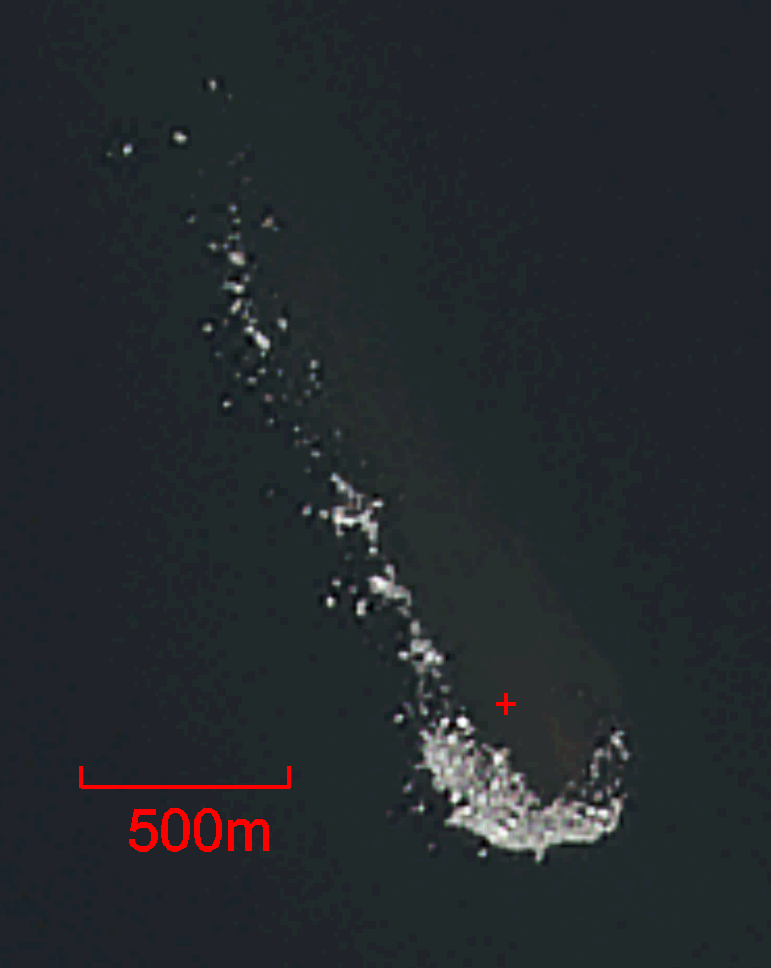
the accumulation of ice at underwater bank at place of former Vasilyevsky Island location (New Siberian Islands, Russia). Red cross marks coordinates 73°59'25.2"N 133°05'28.1"E. Satellite image Sentinel-2, 2-SEP-2016

The island was discovered in the Vasilyevsky Shoal, which formed in the mid-20th century from a melted ice island, Vasilyevsky Island. It was sighted in September 2014 from a helicopter which delivered cargo and goods for the Kotelny Island. In November 2014 the research vessel Admiral Vladimirsky explored the island and officially confirmed its existence. The commander of the helicopter crew explained the name 'Yaya'. "Ya" (я) means the pronoun "I" in Russian. When the island was sighted, everybody started shouting: "I, I discovered it!"
