= Maly Taymyr Island =

Island in the Russian Arctic

Maly Taymyr
Russian: Малый Таймыр
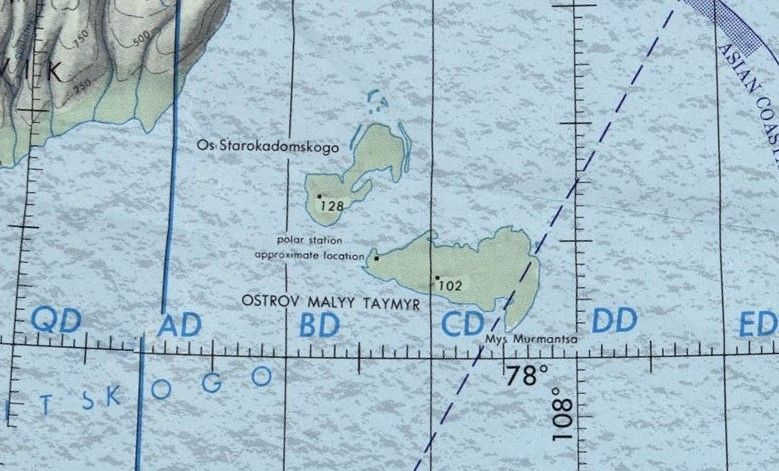
- Maly Taymyr and Starokadomsky Island

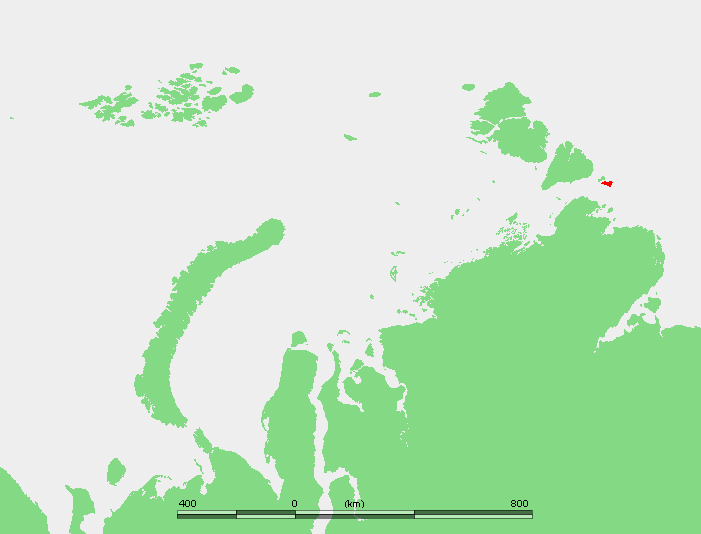
- Location of Maly Taymyr Island in the Laptev Sea

Geography
- Location: Laptev Sea
- Coordinates: 78°7′N 107°15′E
- Archipelago: Severnaya Zemlya
- Area: 232 km^{2} (90 sq mi)
- Length: 28 km (17.4 mi)
- Width: 8 km (5 mi)
- Highest elevation: 31 m (102 ft)

Administration
- Russia

Maly Taymyr Island (Russian: Малый Таймыр, or Little Taymyr Island) is an island in the Laptev Sea, Russian Arctic.

== Geography ==
It is located off the southeastern end of the Severnaya Zemlya archipelago and northeast of the Taymyr Peninsula and has a smaller island, Starokadomsky Island, close by on its northwestern side.

The area of Maly Taymyr Island is 232 km^{2} (90 sq mi) and its location is 78°7′N 107°15′E. The Vilkitsky Strait runs south of Maly Taymyr Island and its waters, as well as the waters surrounding the two islands, are covered with pack ice during the long and bitter winters. There are many ice floes even in the short summer, between June and September.

Maly Taymyr Island belongs to the Krasnoyarsk Krai administrative division of the Russian Federation and is part of the Great Arctic State Nature Reserve – the largest nature reserve of Russia and one of the biggest in the world.

On the northern shores of Maly Taymyr there is a small island named Ostrov Oktyabrenok.

== History ==
The island was discovered by Boris Vilkitsky during the Arctic Ocean Hydrographic Expedition in 1913 and was named Tsesarevich Alexei Island (Russian: Остров Цесаревича Алексея), after Tsesarevich Alexei Nikolaevich, the son of Tsar Nicholas II of Russia. Following the 1917 October Revolution the island was renamed "Maly Taymyr". In 2005 a request was forwarded to the local government in Krasnoyarsk Krai in order to reinstate its former name to the island.

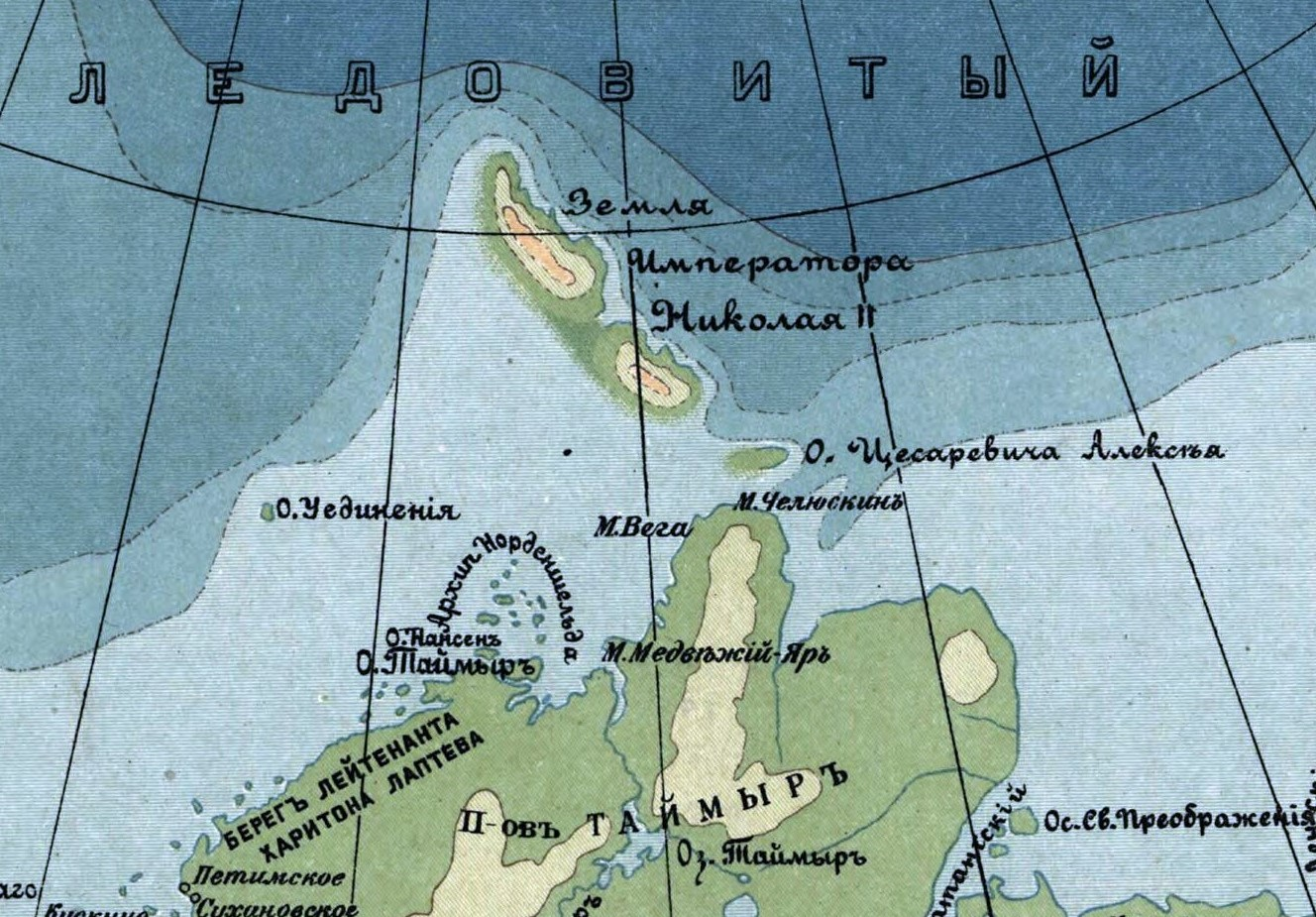
Tsesarevich Alexei Island south of Emperor Nicholas II Land in a 1915 map of the Russian Empire.

== See also ==
- List of islands of Russia
- Severnaya Zemlya§Geography
