= Nakhodka Bay =

Bay of Peter the Great Gulf

Coordinates: 42°49′N 133°00′E

Nakhodka Bay or Nakhodka Gulf (Russian: зали́в Нахо́дка, romanized: zalív Nakhódka) is a bay of the Peter the Great Gulf on Russia's Sea of Japan coast, near the port city of Nakhodka. Recorded by British sailors as Hornet Bay in 1855–1856, it was named залив Америка (zaliv Amerika) (Note: The former Russian name has appeared in English as "America Bay", "Gulf of America", and "Gulf of Amerika".) after the Russian steam corvette Amerika in 1859, and renamed залив Находка (zaliv Nakhodka) in 1972. Lisy Island shelters the bay from open-sea waves.

Map of Nakhodka Bay

The bay is one of the largest transport junctions in the Russian Far East; vessel traffic is extremely intensive here. The Gulf has four ports and four ship-repairing yards. It is a basic port for vessels of the largest companies, such as Primorsk Shipping Corporation (Prisco), and the base of the Active Marine Fishery.

The modern name means "find" or "discovery" in Russian. The Chinese called it Haizaotunwan (Chinese: 海藻屯灣; literally "Seaweed village bay"; Russian: Туне-хай-цао), due to the great amount of seaweed in the waters.

== History ==
In 1855, HMS Winchester and HMS Barracouta are believed to have discovered the bay without exploring it, referring to it as Hornet Bay and Garnet Bay, respectively.

The larger bay was named залив Америка (zaliv Amerika) after the Russian steam corvette Amerika in 1859; the smaller bay was named бухта Находка (bukhta Nakhodka) at the same time. The Amerika entered the larger bay on the evening of 17 June 1859 and anchored because poor visibility made it unsafe to proceed. The following morning, navigator Nikolai Krasilnikov recorded the discovery of the smaller inlet in the ship's log, describing it as about 3 miles (5 km) long and 1 to 1.5 miles (1.6 to 2.4 km) wide; Muravyov-Amursky ordered it named Nakhodka. An early map recorded the names Gulf of America, Nakhodka Bay, Cape Astafyev, and Oblyzina Island.

The first Russian settlement on the bay was established in 1906 and settled the following year. The village was named Amerikanka (Американка, Amerikánka) after the bay. Some initial arrivals refused to live in the settlement because they perceived its name as a reference to the United States. A port was developed at Nakhodka in the 1950s, followed by Vostochny Port in the 1970s on the opposite side of the bay. In 1972 залив Америка was renamed залив Находка (zaliv Nakhodka). The smaller inlet is now known as Bukhta Nakhodka (бу́хта Нахо́дка).

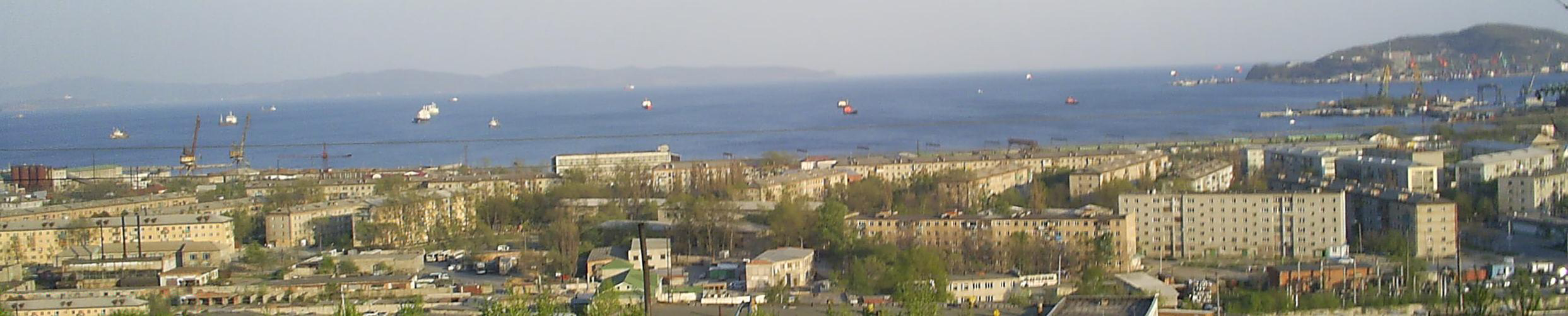
Panorama of Nakhodka Bay as seen from Dzerzhinsky Hill. May 2006
