= Wales Island (Ungava) =

Island in Nunavut, Canada

Wales
- Interactive map of Wales

Geography
- Location: Hudson Strait
- Coordinates: 62°51′N 72°3′W
- Archipelago: Arctic Archipelago

Administration
- Canada
- Nunavut: Nunavut
- Region: Qikiqtaaluk

Demographics
- Population: 0

Wales Island is an Arctic island in the Qikiqtaaluk Region, Nunavut, Canada. It is located within Hudson Strait, an arm of Hudson Bay. It lies just north of the Ungava Peninsula of Quebec.
