= Blossom Point =

Headland on Wrangel Island, Russia

Blossom Point Мыс Блоссом (Russian)
- Headland
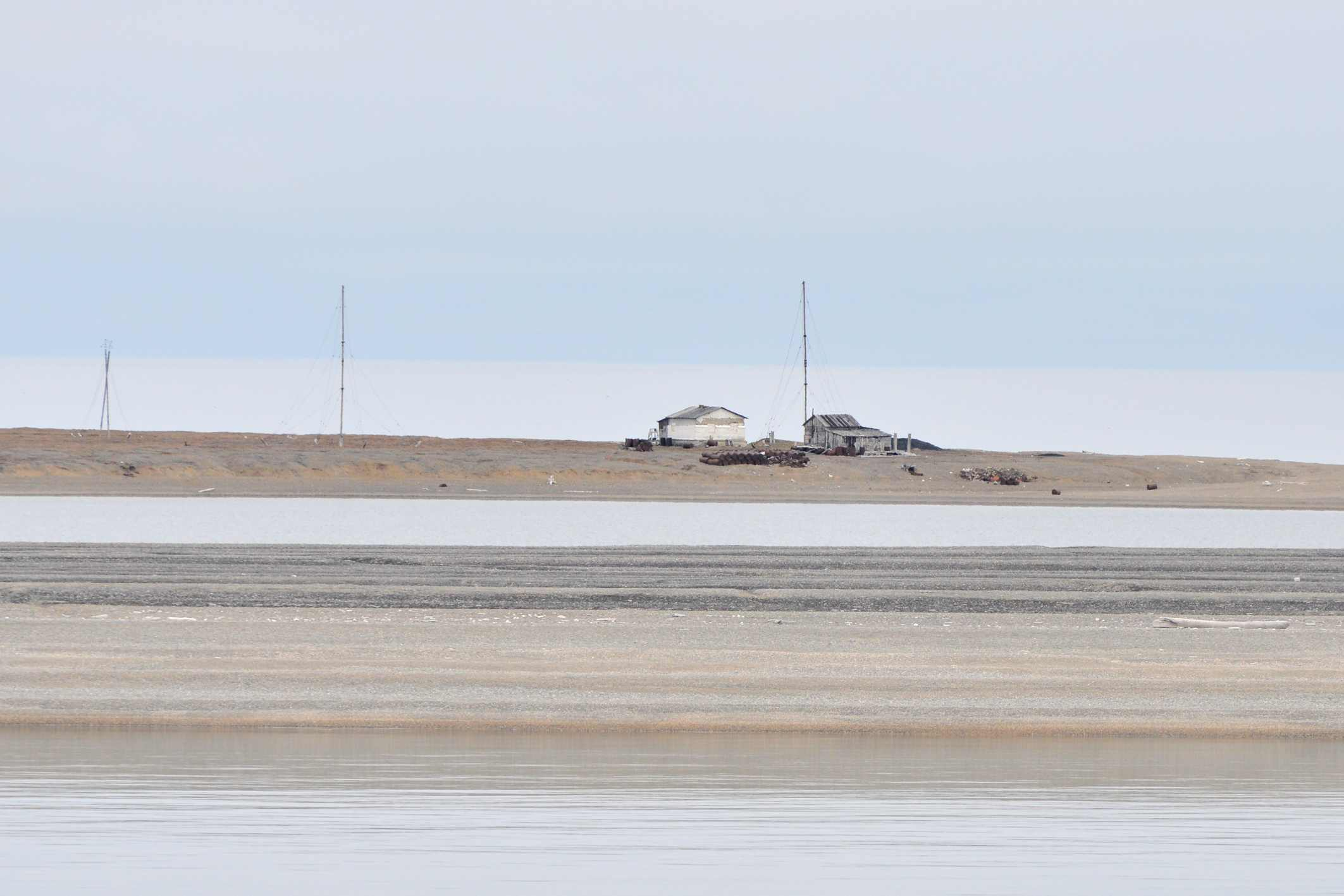
- View of the Polar station at Blossom point

- Location within Chukotka Autonomous Okrug
- Coordinates: 70°46′59.2″N 178°45′47.7″E
- Location: Wrangel Island
- Water bodies: East Siberian Sea / Chukchi Sea

Area
  - Total: Chukotka, Russian Far East
- Elevation: 2 m (6 ft 7 in)

Blossom Point (Russian: Мыс Блоссом), also known as "Cape Blossom", is a headland of Wrangel Island. Administratively it belongs to the Chukotka Autonomous Okrug, Russian Federation.

There are walruses and polar bears in the area of the cape.

== History ==
This headland marks the northern border between the East Siberian Sea and the Chukchi Sea. Located 20 km (12 mi) south of Cape Thomas, it is the westernmost point of Wrangel Island and the point closest to the Siberian mainland.

Blossom Point was named in 1881 by USS Rodgers' Lieutenant Robert M. Berry in honor of HMS Blossom, on which the expedition led by Frederick William Beechey surveyed the Chukchi Sea in 1828.

In 1911, during the Arctic Ocean Hydrographic Expedition led by Boris Vilkitsky on icebreakers Taimyr and Vaigach, the Russian flag was raised north of the cape, towards Cape Thomas, in order to claim Wrangel Island for the Russian Empire.

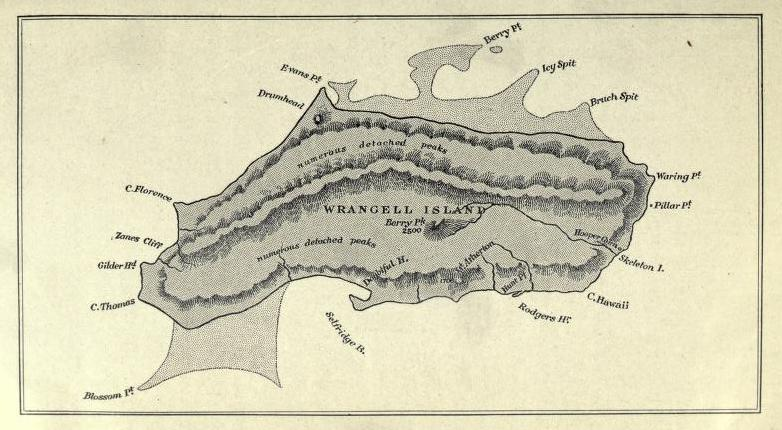
1913 map of Wrangel Island.

== See also ==
- List of research stations in the Arctic
- Waring Point
