= Zhokhov Island =

Island

Native name: Остров Жохова (Russian); Жохов Aрыыта (Yakut)
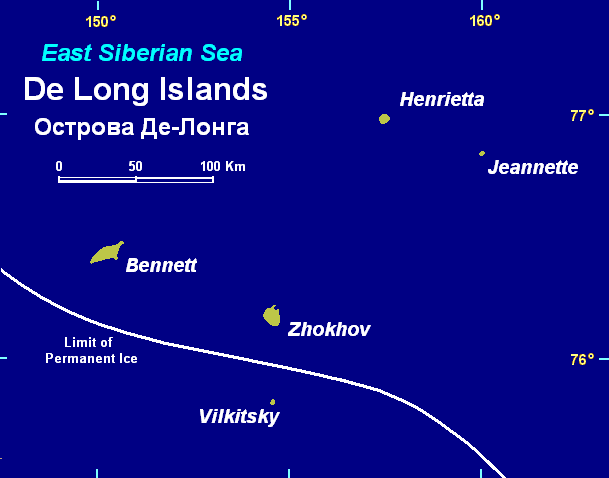
- Map of the De Long Islands.

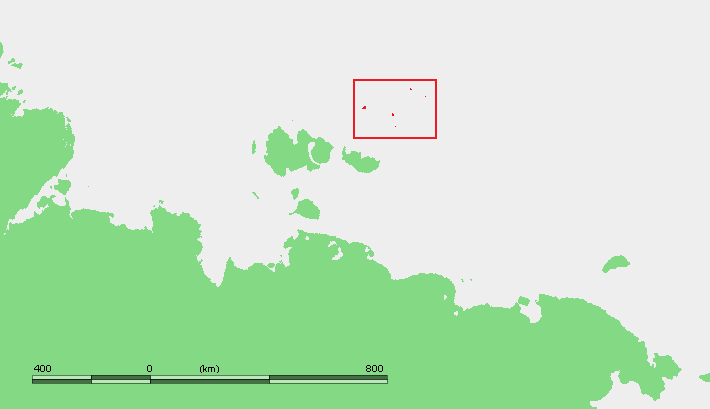
- Map showing the location of the group

Geography
- Location: East Siberian Sea
- Coordinates: 76.141111°N 152.733056°E
- Archipelago: De Long Islands
- Total islands: 5
- Area: 77 km^{2} (30 sq mi)
- Length: 10.8 km (6.71 mi)
- Width: 8.7 km (5.41 mi)
- Highest elevation: 123 m (404 ft)

Administration
- Russia
- Federal subject: Far Eastern Federal District
- Republic: Yakutia

Demographics
- Population: 0

Zhokhov Island (Russian: Остров Жохова, romanized: Ostrov Zhokhova; Yakut: Жохов Aрыыта, romanized: Joqov Arııta) is an island in the East Siberian Sea, situated 128 km north east of Novaya Sibir Island, the easternmost of the New Siberian Islands. Administratively the island belongs to the Yakutia administrative division of Russia.

== Geography ==
Zhokhov Island is part of the De Long group. The nearest island is Vilkitsky Island, the southernmost island of the group. Zhokhov is 10.8 km (6.7 mi) in length and has an area of 77 km^{2} (30 sq mi). The highest point of the island is 123 m (404 ft).

Although the island itself is unglaciated, the sea surrounding Zhokhov Island is covered with fast ice, even during the summer, and the climate is severe.

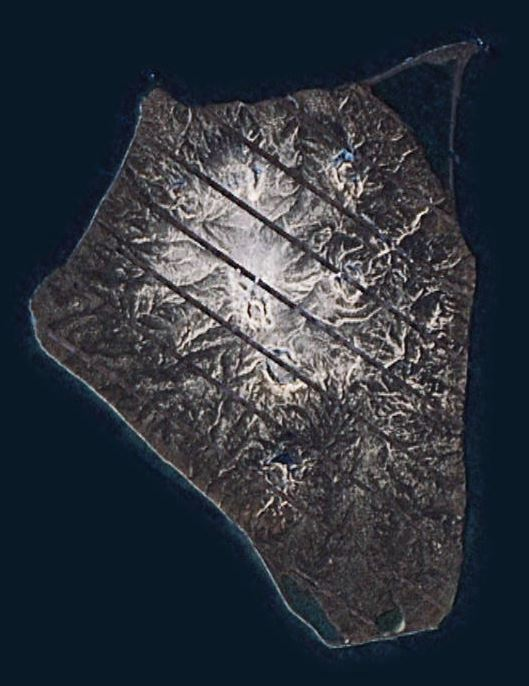
Zhokhov Island Landsat picture.

== Geology ==
Zhokhov Island is an eroded late Cenozoic stratovolcano. Deeply cut seacliffs expose alternating flows of massive and blister lava, agglomerate and tuff. The exposed throat of this volcano is filled with columnar jointed basalts. The surrounding volcanic edifice consists of interlayered picrite–olivine basalts lava flows and beds of volcanic ash containing large volcanic bombs. The basalt lava flows range in age from 1.2 to 10 Ma according to K–Ar dating. The basalts contain xenoliths of sandstones, limestones, granites, syenites, and dolerites. Rare limestone xenoliths contain middle Carboniferous, tropical, marine invertebrate fossils.

== Vegetation ==
Rush/grass, forb, cryptogam tundra covers the Zhokhov Island. It is tundra consisting mostly of very low-growing grasses, rushes, forbs, mosses, lichens, and liverworts. These plants either mostly or completely cover the surface of the ground. The soils are typically moist, fine-grained, and often hummocky.

== History ==
Mesolithic humans occupied the island as early as 6000 BCE. Tools of stone, bone, antler, and ivory have been found, as well as wooden arrow shafts and a sledge runner. Animal remains suggest a culture dependent on the hunting of polar bears and reindeer. Evidence published in 2017 suggests that the early inhabitants of Zhokhov Island were among the first humans to selectively breed dogs. Findings indicate that larger dogs may have been bred for hunting and smaller dogs weighing 16 kilograms (35 lb) to 25 kilograms (55 lb) were bred for pulling sleds. DNA extracted from a 9,500-year-old dog, Zhokhov, named after the island, contributed significant genetic material to the Greenland Dog, the Alaskan Malamute and the Siberian Husky.

In modern times, Zhokhov Island was discovered by the 1910–1915 Russian Arctic Ocean Hydrographic Expedition under Boris Vilkitsky on the ships Vaygach and Taymyr. It was originally named Novopashenniy Island, after Piotr Alekseyevich Novopashenniy (1881–1950) Captain of icebreaker Vaygach, but in 1926 it was renamed after Lieutenant Alexey Zhokhov, a member of the expedition.

== Climate ==
Climate data for Zhokov Island
Month	Jan	Feb	Mar	Apr	May	Jun	Jul	Aug	Sep	Oct	Nov	Dec	Year
Record high °C (°F)	−7.8 (18.0)	−2.8 (27.0)	−7.8 (18.0)	−3.0 (26.6)	7.2 (45.0)	11.0 (51.8)	14.5 (58.1)	18.0 (64.4)	7.5 (45.5)	11.0 (51.8)	−1.7 (28.9)	−3.2 (26.2)	18.0 (64.4)
Mean daily maximum °C (°F)	−25.5 (−13.9)	−26.5 (−15.7)	−24.2 (−11.6)	−17.4 (0.7)	−6.9 (19.6)	−0.1 (31.8)	2.7 (36.9)	1.4 (34.5)	−2.6 (27.3)	−11.1 (12.0)	−20.1 (−4.2)	−24.2 (−11.6)	−14.1 (6.6)
Daily mean °C (°F)	−28.3 (−18.9)	−29.3 (−20.7)	−27.2 (−17.0)	−20.4 (−4.7)	−9.0 (15.8)	−1.5 (29.3)	1.1 (34.0)	0.3 (32.5)	−4.3 (24.3)	−13.8 (7.2)	−22.9 (−9.2)	−26.9 (−16.4)	−16.6 (2.1)
Mean daily minimum °C (°F)	−31.6 (−24.9)	−32.4 (−26.3)	−30.7 (−23.3)	−24.4 (−11.9)	−12.0 (10.4)	−3.3 (26.1)	−0.6 (30.9)	−1.9 (28.6)	−6.6 (20.1)	−17.1 (1.2)	−26.1 (−15.0)	−29.9 (−21.8)	−19.5 (−3.1)
Record low °C (°F)	−46.1 (−51.0)	−48.0 (−54.4)	−45.0 (−49.0)	−38.0 (−36.4)	−26.0 (−14.8)	−15.0 (5.0)	−7.6 (18.3)	−8.9 (16.0)	−23.1 (−9.6)	−33.0 (−27.4)	−38.0 (−36.4)	−43.0 (−45.4)	−48.0 (−54.4)
Average precipitation mm (inches)	13.6 (0.54)	12.3 (0.48)	7.8 (0.31)	33.6 (1.32)	20.2 (0.80)	63.8 (2.51)	68.2 (2.69)	114.9 (4.52)	53.1 (2.09)	50.1 (1.97)	31.1 (1.22)	9.5 (0.37)	478.2 (18.83)

== In popular culture ==
Opening shot from Dr. Strangelove: "the perpetually fog-shrouded wasteland below the Arctic peaks of the Zhokhov Islands"

Zhokhov Island is mentioned in Stanley Kubrick's Dr. Strangelove or: How I Learned to Stop Worrying and Love the Bomb as a place where the Russians built the doomsday device.

Ostrov Zhokhova is also mentioned in the Soviet "sad comedy" film by Georgii Danelia "Osennii Marafon" (Autumn Marathon). The film's "hero" Andrei Buzykin's daughter and her husband depart to take up a job in the weather station on Zhokhov Island, to Andrei's horror.

== See also ==
- List of islands of Russia
