= Vilkitsky Island (East Siberian Sea) =

Island in the East Siberian Sea

Native name: Остров Вильки́цкого (Russian); Bилькицкай Aрыыта (Yakut)
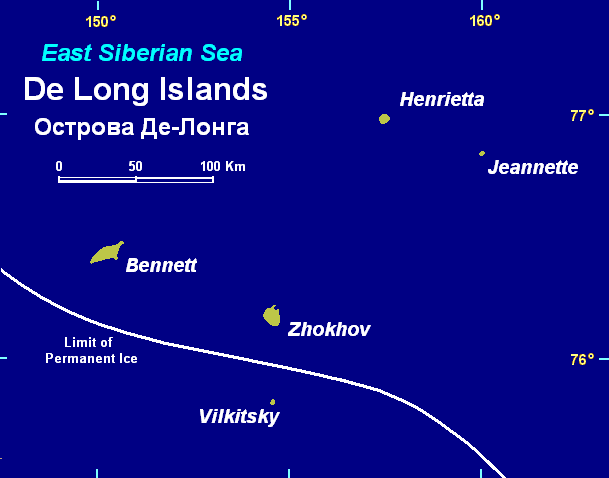
- Map of the De Long Islands.

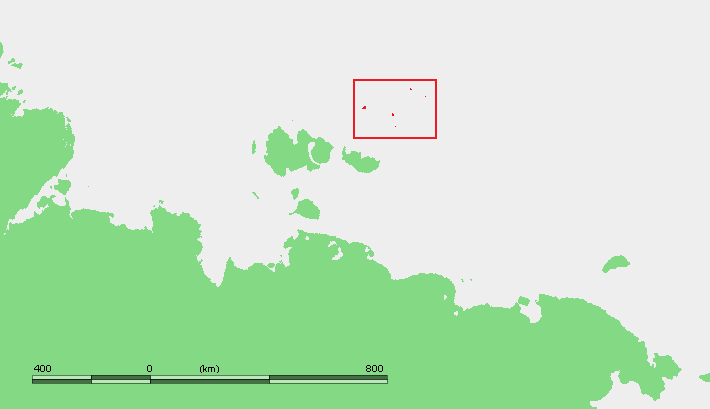
- Map showing the location of the group

Geography
- Location: East Siberian Sea
- Coordinates: 75°42′N 152°30′E
- Archipelago: De Long Islands
- Total islands: 5
- Area: 1.5 km^{2} (0.58 sq mi)
- Length: 2 km (1.2 mi)
- Width: 1 km (0.6 mi)
- Highest elevation: 70 m (230 ft)

Administration
- Russia
- Federal subject: Far Eastern Federal District
- Republic: Yakutia

Demographics
- Population: uninhabited

Vilkitsky Island (Russian: Остров Вильки́цкого, romanized: Ostrov Vilkitskogo; Yakut: Вилькицкай Aрыыта, romanized: Vil'kitskay Arııta) is the southernmost island of the De Long group in the northern part of the East Siberian Sea. The nearest island is Zhokhov Island. Administratively Vilkitsky Island belongs to Yakutia, an administrative division of the Russian Federation.

The island is named after Russian hydrographer Andrey Vilkitsky.

== Geography ==
The island is outside of the limits of permanent ice and is unglaciated. At barely 1.5 square kilometres (0.6 square miles) Vilkitsky is the smallest island of the group. The highest elevation is 70 metres (230 feet) above sea level.

== Geology ==
Judging from bedrock outcrops associated with the central, steepest part of seacliffs on its southern coast, Vilkitsky Island is composed of limburgite, a dense dark gray volcanic rock. The limburgite is represent by varieties with both crystalline textures and glassy, devitrified matrix. This volcanic rock occurs as both massive intrusions and lava flows, both of which exhibit narrow shear zones. The limburgite contains small olivine phenocrysts and xenoliths of spinel lherzolites. The spinel lherzolite xenoliths of Vilkitsky Island are structurally and mineralogically identical to the xenoliths found on Zhokhov Island. Based on limited data, volcanism on Vil’kitskii Island occurred between 0.89 and 0.4 Ma. This period of volcanism on Vilkitsky Island correlates with the later stages of olivine alkaline basalt volcanism on Zhokhov Island between 6.1 and 0.4 Ma.

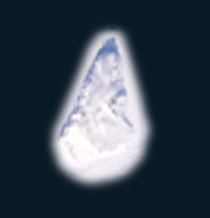
Vilkitsky Island Landsat picture.

== History ==
Vilkitsky Island was discovered early on the morning of August 20, 1913 by the crew of the Icebreaker Taymyr. Along with the Icebreaker Vaygach, it was part of the Imperial Russian Arctic Ocean Hydrographic Expedition led by Boris Vilkitsky on behalf of the Russian Hydrographic Service in order to chart the last blank areas of Russian maps. Personnel from the Icebreaker Taymyr landed on it and hoisted a Russian flag. On August 24, 1914, a landing party from the Icebreaker Taymyr revisited Vilkitskiy Island and surveyed it. In 1986 and 1988, the Institute of Oceanology of the USSR Academy of Sciences, now known as the Shirshov Institute of Oceanology, and the Geochemical Institute of the USSR Academy of Sciences carried out field studies of the geology of the Zhokhov and Vilkitsky islands.

== See also ==
- List of islands of Russia
