= Jeannette Island =

Island in the East Siberian Sea

Native name: Остров Жанне́тты (Russian); Жаннетта Aрыыта (Yakut)
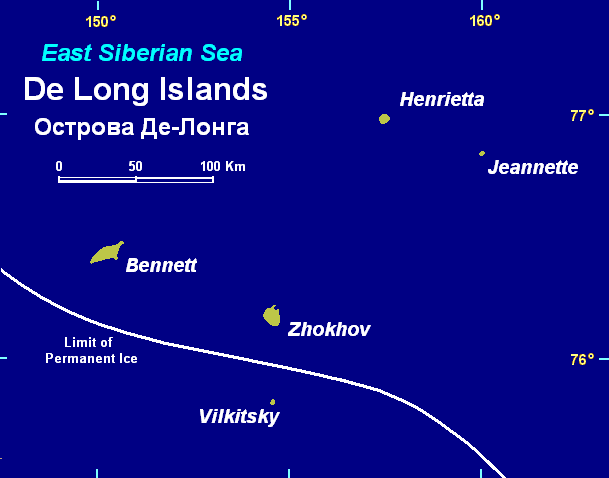
- Jeannette is the group's easternmost island

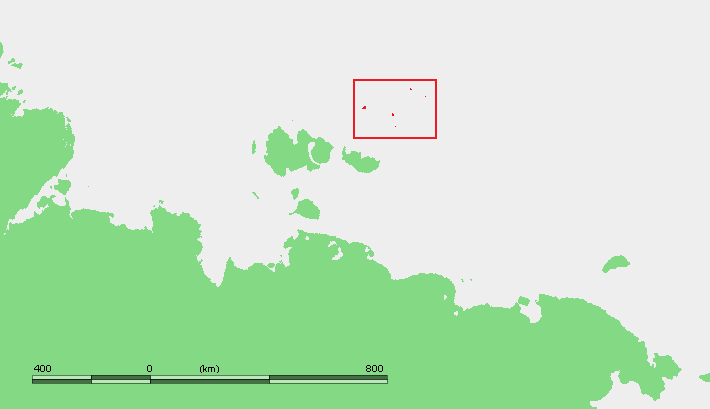
- Etymology: USS Jeannette

Geography
- Coordinates: 76°42′56″N 158°06′33″E
- Archipelago: De Long Islands
- Area: 3.3 km^{2} (1.3 sq mi)
- Length: 3 km (1.9 mi)
- Width: 1.3 km (0.81 mi)
- Highest elevation: 351 m (1152 ft)

Administration
- Russia
- Federal subject: Far Eastern Federal District
- Republic: Yakutia

Demographics
- Population: uninhabited

Jeannette Island (Russian: Остров Жанне́тты, romanized: Ostrov Zhannetty; Yakut: Жаннетта Aрыыта, romanized: Jannetta Arııta) is the easternmost island of the De Long Islands archipelago in the East Siberian Sea. Administratively it belongs to Yakutia of the Russian Federation.

== Geography ==
Jeannette is the second smallest island of the De Long group, being only 2 km (1.2 mi) in length. It has an area of approximately 3.3 km^{2} (1.3 sq mi). The island surface is mainly covered by a central ice cap and firn. The highest peak of the island is in the middle of the ice cap, reaching a height of 351 m (1,152 ft). A second subordinate peak reaches an elevation of 225 m (738 ft). On all sides, the shores of the island consist of 100–350 m (328–1,148 ft) high, continuous, and rocky seacliffs that are higher and steeper in the southern and southeastern part and shallower in the northern part.

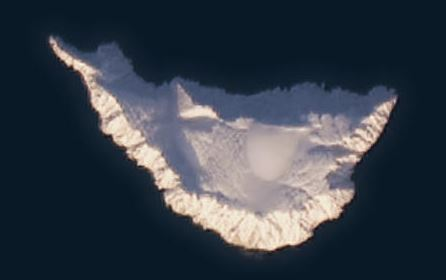
Jeannette Island Landsat picture.

== Geology ==
The most accessible and extensive exposure of bedrock is along the southwestern coast. These seacliffs expose a thick succession of Upper Cambrian volcaniclastic rocks which contain subordinate beds of tuffs and dacitic and andesitic lava flows. The volcanoclastic rocks are penetrated by mafic dikes and sills.

These sedimentary rocks consist generally of both fine- and coarse-grained volcaniclastic turbidites with thick beds of volcaniclastic breccias which can divided into four layers. The lowermost of the exposed layers consists of 125 m (410 ft) of fine-grained volcaniclastic turbidites, occasionally interbedded with thin layers of coarse-grained sandstone and pebbly sandstone. The middle part of this layer exhibits slump structures and convolute bedding along with a few lava flows and layers of bright red tuff. Overlying the lowermost layer, is 160 m (525 ft) of tuffaceous breccias with a sandy or silty matrix. The poorly rounded and sharp-edged pebbles forming the breccia consist mainly of andesitic volcanic rocks. The next overlying layer consists of 50 m (164 ft) of fine-grained volcaniclastic turbidites and minor tuffaceous breccias. The breccias consists of angular to sub-angular pebbles of volcanic rocks (andesite, dacite and occasionally basaltic andesite). The uppermost layer of sedimentary rocks, exposed in these seaclifts, consists of 150 m (492 ft) of predominantly coarse-grained volcaniclastic turbidites.

The bedding within these volcanoclastic rocks dip steeply towards the east-northeast. The bedding is deformed by similar folds accompanied by cleavage and east-dipping thrust faults with displacements of few tens of meters. The bedding is also offset by normal faults inclined to the east and intruded by northwest trending dolerite dikes.

== History ==
It was discovered in 1881 by the Jeannette Expedition, commanded by Lieutenant Commander George W. De Long. The expedition set out in 1879 aboard the USS Jeannette, hoping to reach Wrangel Island and to discover open seas in the Arctic Ocean near the North Pole.

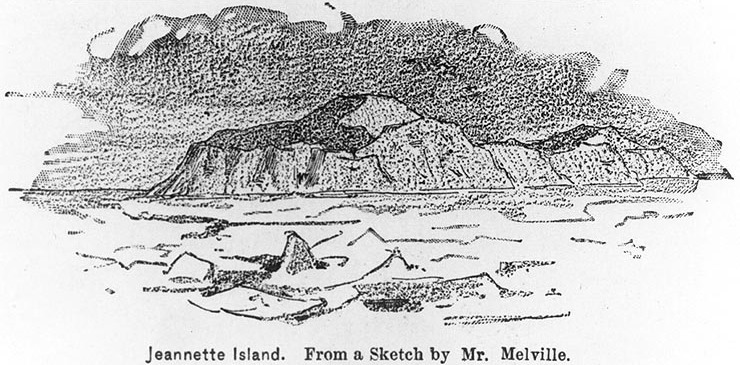
Jeannette Island by George Melville, May 1881

However, the ship entered an ice pack near Herald Island in September 1879 and became trapped. The vessel drifted several hundred miles with the ice, passing north of Wrangel Island. In May 1881 it approached Jeannette Island and Henrietta Island.

According to The Annual Report of the Secretary of the Navy, for the Year 1882, "A sled party landed [on Henrietta Island], hoisted the national ensign, and took possession in the name of the United States. The excursion, led by George W. Melville, landed on June 2 or 3, 1882, constructed a cairn, and placed inside it a record of their visit.

During the Imperial Russian Arctic Ocean Hydrographic Expedition of 1910–1915 led by Boris Vilkitsky, the Vaygach approached Jeannette Island with the intention of mapping Jeannette and Henrietta Islands, but heavy ice blocked the approach. In 1916 the Russian ambassador in London issued an official notice to the effect that the Imperial government considered Henrietta, along with other Arctic islands, integral parts of the Russian Empire. This territorial claim was later maintained by the Soviet Union.

Some U.S. individuals assert American ownership of Jeannette Island, and others of the De Long group, based on the 1881 discovery. However, the United States government has not pursued De Long's claim to Jeannette Island, and recognizes it as Russian territory.
