= Vilkitsky Island (Kara Sea) =

Island in Russia

Native name: о́стров Вильки́цкого
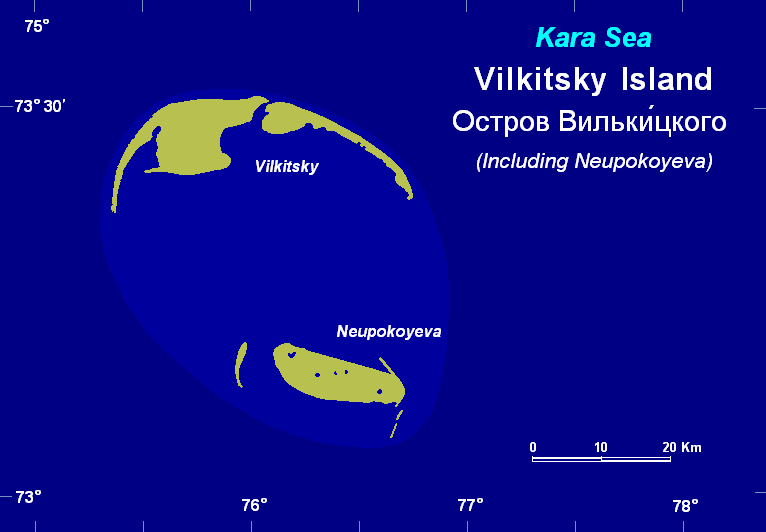
- Map of Vilkitsky and Neupokoyeva Islands

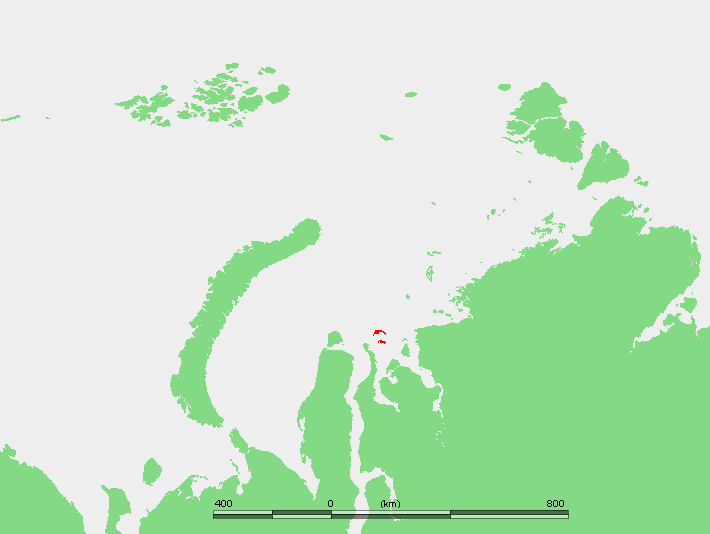
- Location of Vilkitsky and Neupokoyeva Islands in the Kara Sea

Geography
- Location: Kara Sea
- Coordinates: 73°28′N 75°45′E
- Area: 153.9 km^{2} (59.4 sq mi)
- Length: 42 km (26.1 mi)
- Width: 12 km (7.5 mi)
- Highest elevation: 5 m (16 ft)

Administration
- Russia
- Oblast: Tyumen Oblast
- Okrug: Yamalo-Nenets Autonomous Okrug

Demographics
- Population: uninhabited

Vilkitsky Island, (Russian: Остров Вильки́цкого; Ostrov Vil'kitskogo) is an island in the Kara Sea. It is located 40 km northeast of Shokalsky Island, off the tip of the Gyda Peninsula in North Siberia.

This island is not to be confused with other islands called "Vilkitsky", such as the small Vilkitsky group (now mentioned as Dzhekman Islands in most maps) which is part of the Nordenskiöld Archipelago, the Vilkitsky Islands located in the Laptev Sea off the eastern shores of the Taymyr Peninsula, and also Vilkitsky Island in the De Long Group in the East Siberian Sea.

== Geography ==
Vilkitsky Island is bleak and windswept and is covered with tundra. The island is crescent-shaped and it is divided in two by a narrow sound in its midst. It is 42 km in length but only 12 km wide at its broadest zone.

The sea surrounding this island is covered with pack ice in the winter and there are numerous ice floes even in the summer. There is a large shallow area between Vilkitsky Island and its southern neighbor, Neupokoyev Island (Остров Неупокоева), named after Konstantin Neupokoev (1884—1924), a naval officer, hydrographer and explorer of the Russian Hydrographic Service in Soviet times.

Vilkitsky Island belongs to the Tyumen Oblast administrative division of the Russian Federation. It is also part of the Great Arctic State Nature Reserve, the largest nature reserve of Russia.

This island is named after Russian hydrographer Boris Vilkitsky's father Andrey Vilkitsky, while the Vilkitsky Islands in the Laptev sea are named after Russian hydrographer Boris Vilkitsky himself.

== See also ==
- Kara Sea
