= Henrietta Island =

Island in the East Siberian Sea

Native name: Остров Генриетты (Russian); Хенриетта Aрыыта (Yakut)
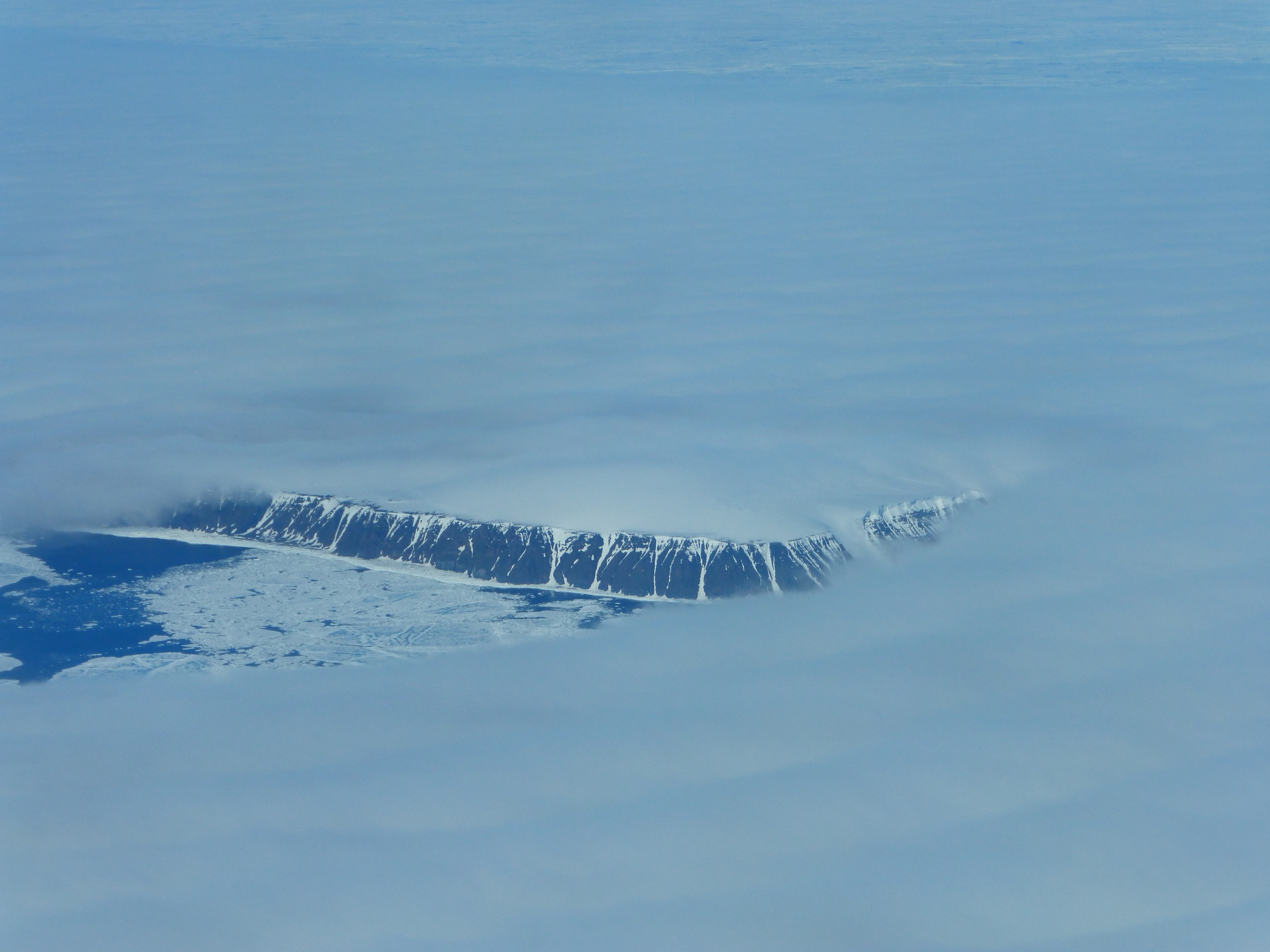
- View of the shores of Henrietta Island.

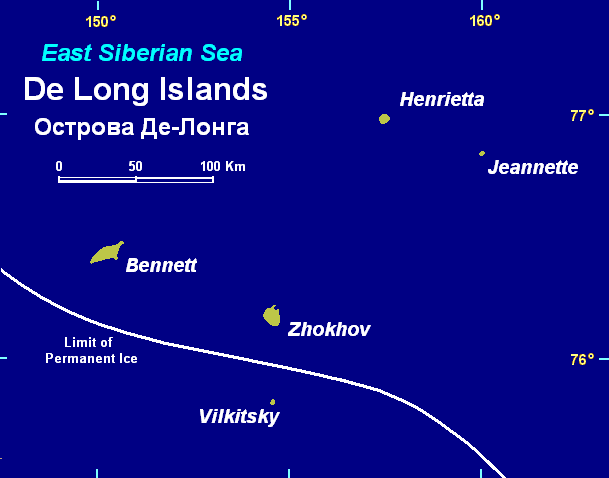
- Henrietta is the northernmost island of the De Long group

Geography
- Location: Arctic Ocean
- Coordinates: 77°06′N 156°30′E
- Archipelago: De Long Islands
- Area: 15 km^{2} (5.8 sq mi)
- Length: 6 km (3.7 mi)
- Width: 5 km (3.1 mi)
- Highest elevation: 312 m (1024 ft)
- Highest point: Ice cap

Administration
- Russia
- Federal Subject: Yakutia

Demographics
- Population: 0

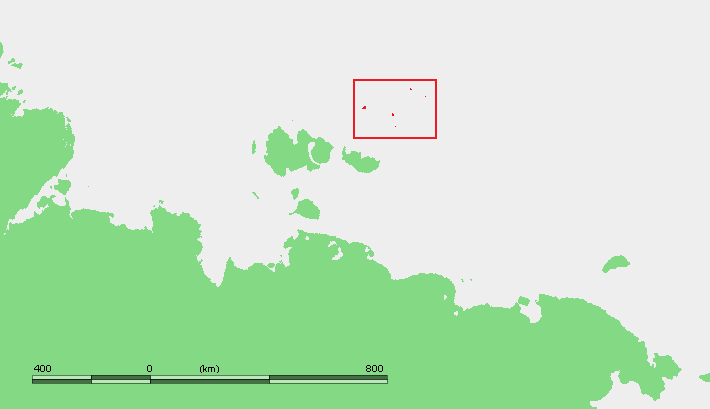
Location of the De Long Islands.

Henrietta Island (Russian: Остров Генриетты, romanized: Ostrov Genriyetty; Yakut: Хенриетта Aрыыта, romanized: Xenriyetta Arııta) is the northernmost island of the De Long archipelago in the East Siberian Sea. Administratively it belongs to Yakutia of the Russian Federation.

== Geography ==
Henrietta is roughly circular in shape with a diameter of about 5 to 6 km (3 to 4 mi) and area of about 15 km^{2} (5.8 sq mi). Its shoreline consists of 50 to 100 m (164 to 328 ft) high, continuous, and rocky seacliffs. Cape Melville (Mys Mel'villya), Henrietta's northernmost landhead, is the northernmost point of the De Long Islands, as well as the northernmost land thousands of miles east and west. The closest land is Jeannette Island, located to the east-southeast.

=== Ice cap ===
Almost half of the island is covered by a central ice cap that reaches its maximum height at 312 m (1,024 ft) above sea level. The ice cap area has a surface of approximately 6 km^{2} (2.3 sq mi) and occupies the highest south-eastern part of the island. The southern and eastern edges of the ice cap are fringed by 40 to 50 m (131 to 164 ft) tall icy cliffs rising above the underlying basalt plateau.

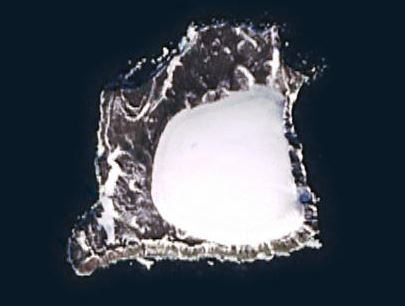
Henrietta Island Landsat picture

== Geology ==
Henrietta Island consists of unmetamorphosed, folded and faulted Ediacaran and Middle-Upper Cambrian volcaniclastic sedimentary strata and Upper Cambrian basalt.

The Ediacaran strata consist of about 150 m (492 ft) of volcaniclastic turbidite beds with subordinate beds of tuffaceous breccias and dacitic tuffs. They are similar to the volcaniclastic rocks observed on Jeanette Island. These turbidites are mainly fine-grained, grading from siltstones at their base to mudstones at their top. Rare beds of pebbly breccias with a sandy matrix occur at the base of the coarser turbidites. Their pebbles are composed of volcanic rocks. These strata contain several meters of red tuffs and synsedimentary slump structures.

The Cambrian strata consists of two sets of sedimentary strata. The lower set of strata consists of about 160 m (525 ft) of parallel-laminated sandstones and siltstone with beds of polymictic conglomerates, The cobbles and pebbles of the conglomerates range from sub-angular to rounded and are composed of schist, granites, quartz, and volcanic rocks. In the northern clifts of Henrietta Island, a bed of basaltic andesite occurs within this set of strata. It conformably overlies the Ediacaran strata. The upper set of Cambrian strata consists of about 140 m (459 ft) of medium- to coarse-grained quartzose sandstone. The sandstone contains beds of quartz conglomerates and subordinate beds of siltstones. Sandstones exhibit parallel and planar-lamination with occasional ripple marks. Thick beds of Upper Cambrian basalt and andesitic basalt unconformably overlie these beds.

The intensity of tectonic deformation varies across the island. The most intense deformation, folding and thrusting, occurs in the southwest part of Henrietta Island. In contrast, the strata are monoclinal with gently dipping beds in the south, east, and north of the island. The Ediacaran and Cambrian strata have been intruded by numerous sills and dikes of basalt and porphyritic diorite.

== History ==
American explorer and US Navy lieutenant commander George W. De Long set out in 1879 aboard the Jeannette, hoping to reach Wrangel Island and to discover open seas in the Arctic Ocean near the North Pole. However, the ship entered an ice pack near Herald Island in September 1879 and became trapped. The vessel drifted several hundred miles with the ice, passing north of Wrangel Island. In May 1881 it approached Jeannette Island and Henrietta Island. According to The Annual Report of the Secretary of the Navy, for the Year 1882 (p. 16), "A sled party landed, hoisted the national ensign, and took possession in the name of the United States". The excursion was led by George W. Melville, accompanied by William Dunbar, William Nindemann, Hans Erichsen, Walter Sharvell and James Bartlett. They landed on June 2 or 3, constructed a cairn, and placed inside it a record of their visit.

During the 1914–1915 Imperial Russian Arctic Ocean Hydrographic Expedition led by Boris Vilkitsky, the Vaygach approached Jeannette Island with the intention of mapping Jeannette and Henrietta Islands, but heavy ice blocked the approach. In 1916 the Russian ambassador in London issued an official notice to the effect that the Imperial government considered Henrietta, along with other Arctic islands, integral parts of the Russian Empire. This territorial claim was later maintained by the Soviet Union.

A Soviet polar station was established on Henrietta Island in 1937 in an expedition by Rudolf Samoylovich, and closed in 1963. Henrietta Island served in 1979 as the starting point for a Soviet expedition to the North Pole on skis.

Some U.S. individuals assert American ownership of Henrietta Island, and others of the De Long group, based on the 1881 discovery and claim. However, according to the U.S. Department of State in 2003, the U.S. government has never claimed Henrietta Island.

== Physical description ==
Henrietta Island was described by the sled party from the De Long expedition in the following terms: "The island is a desolate rock, surmounted by a snow-cap, which feeds several discharging glaciers on its east face. Dovekies nesting in the face of the rock are the only signs of game. A little moss, some grass, and a handful of rock were brought back as trophies. The cliffs are inaccessible, because of their steepness."

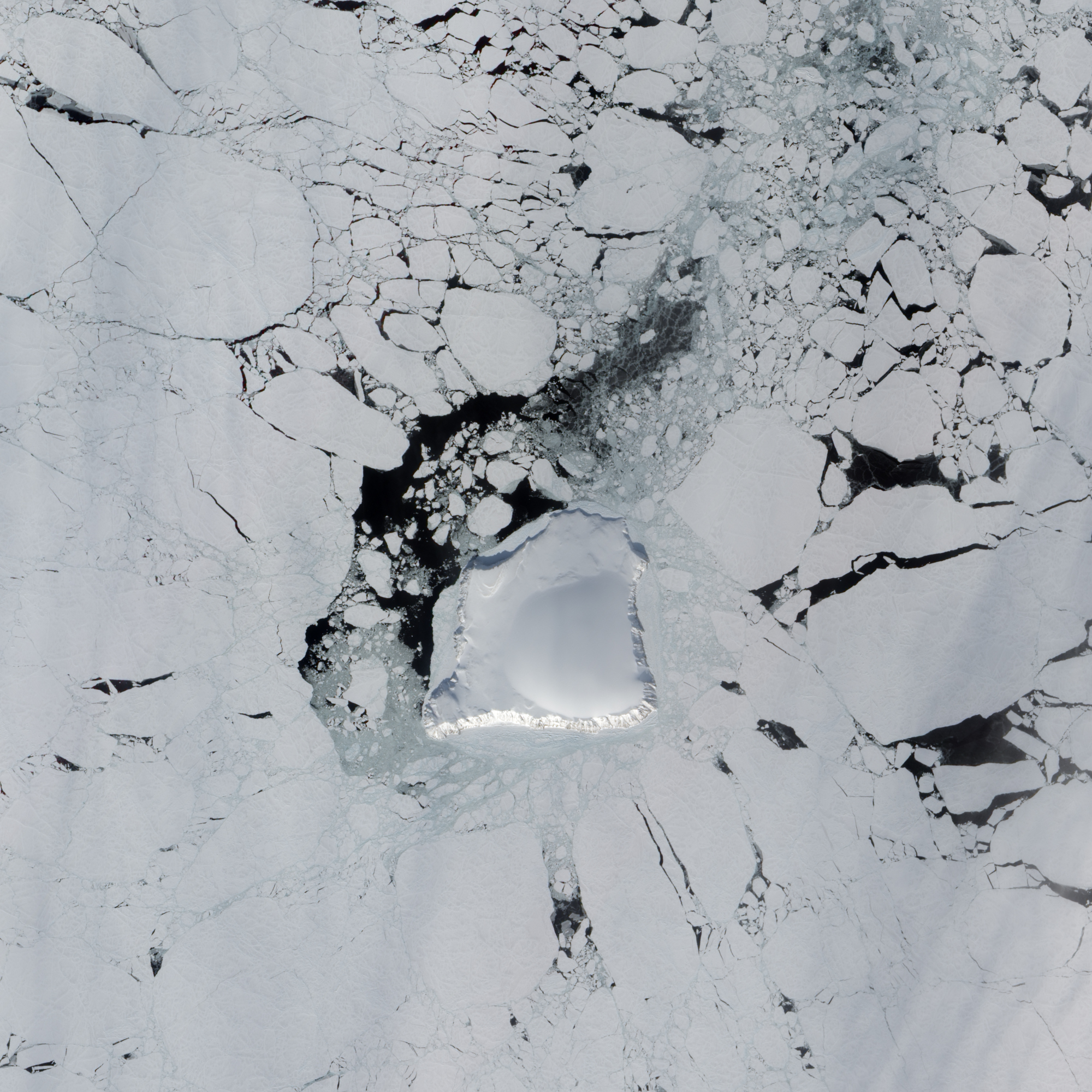
Henrietta Island as seen from space

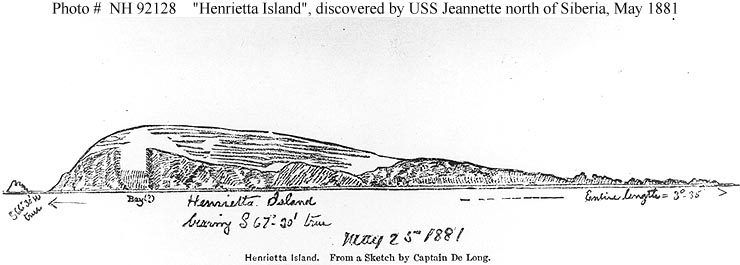
Sketch by Lt. Cmdr. George DeLong on 25 May 1881, depicting Henrietta Island, north of Siberia
