= De Long Islands =

Uninhabited archipelago

Native name: Острова Де-Лонга (Russian); Де Лоҥ Aрыылара (Yakut)
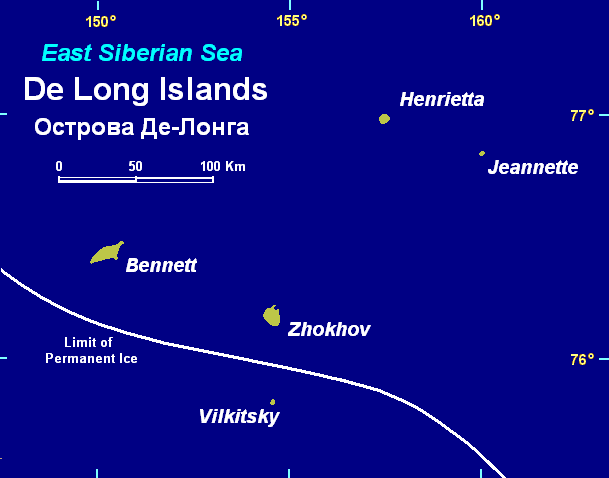

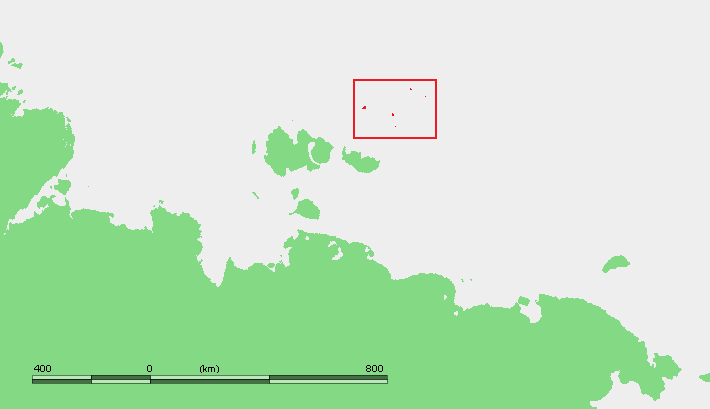

Geography
- Location: East Siberian Sea
- Coordinates: 76°39′N 153°39′E
- Archipelago: De Long
- Total islands: 5
- Major islands: Bennett Island
- Area: 228 km^{2} (88 sq mi)
- Highest elevation: 426 m (1398 ft)
- Highest point: Mount De Long

Administration
- Russia
- Federal subject: Far Eastern Federal District
- Republic: Yakutia

Demographics
- Population: 0 ( 2000 )

The De Long Islands (Russian: Острова Де-Лонга, romanized: Ostrova De-Longa; Yakut: Де Лоҥ Aрыылара, romanized: De Loŋ Arıılara) are an uninhabited archipelago often included as part of the New Siberian Islands, lying north east of Novaya Sibir.

== Geography ==
This archipelago consists of Jeannette Island, Henrietta Island, Bennett Island, Vilkitsky Island and Zhokhov Island. These five islands have a total area of 228 square kilometres (88 sq mi). Bennett Island is the largest island and it also has the archipelago's highest point at 426 metres (1,398 ft). These islands lie around 77°N, are partially covered by glaciers, and rise to peaks.

In 1996, the total area of these islands covered by ice caps and glaciers was 80.6 square kilometres (31.1 sq mi). This island group belongs to the Sakha (Yakutia) Republic administrative division of Russia.

| Island name | Cyrillic | Area km² (sq mi) | Location |
|---|---|---|---|
| Bennett | Остров Беннетта | 150 (58) | 76°42′N 148°59′E |
| Henrietta | Остров Генриетты | 12 (4.6) | 77°5′25″N 156°34′0″E |
| Jeannette | Остров Жаннетты | 3.3 (1.3) | 76°47′22″N 158°5′28″E |
| Zhokhov | Остров Жохова | 77 (30) | 76°9′N 152°43′E |
| Vilkitsky | Остров Вилькицкого | 1.5 (0.58) | 75°42′45″N 152°27′37″E |

== Geology ==
Early Paleozoic, Middle Paleozoic, Cretaceous, and Neogene rocks have been mapped within the De Long Islands. The Early Paleozoic rocks are Cambrian and Ordovician sedimentary rocks interbedded with minor amounts of limestone. The Middle Paleozoic rocks consist of predominately folded and faulted basaltic, andesitic, and dioritic volcanoclastics, tuffs, lavas, dikes, and sills. Cretaceous rocks are composed of basalts and interbedded argillites, sandstones and minor coals. The youngest rocks exposed within the De Long Islands are Neogene basaltic volcanic rocks.

=== Quaternary geology ===
The De Long Islands were once major hills within the Great Arctic Plain that once formed the northern part of Late Pleistocene “Beringia” between Siberia and Alaska during the Last Glacial Maximum (Late Weichselian Epoch). These islands are what remains of about 1.6 million square kilometres (620 thousand square miles) of the formally subaerial Great Arctic Plain that now lies submerged below the Arctic Ocean and East Siberian Sea. At this plain's greatest extent during the Last Glacial Maximum, sea level was 100–120 m below modern sea level and the coastline was located 700 to 1,000 kilometres (430–620 miles) north of its current position. This plain was neither extensively glaciated during the Late Pleistocene nor during the Last Glacial Maximum because it lay in the rain shadow of the Northern European ice sheet. The Great Arctic Plain was submerged, except for the New Siberian and other isolated islands, within a relatively short time span of 7,000 years during the Early-Middle Holocene.

During the extremely frigid polar climate of the Last Glacial Maximum (Late Weichselian Epoch), 17,000 to 24,000 BP, small passive ice caps did form on the De Long Islands. Fragments of these ice caps are preserved on Jeannette, Henrietta, and Bennett Islands. Traces of former Late Weichselian slope and cirque glaciers in the form of buried ground ice deposits are preserved on Zhokhov Island.

== History ==
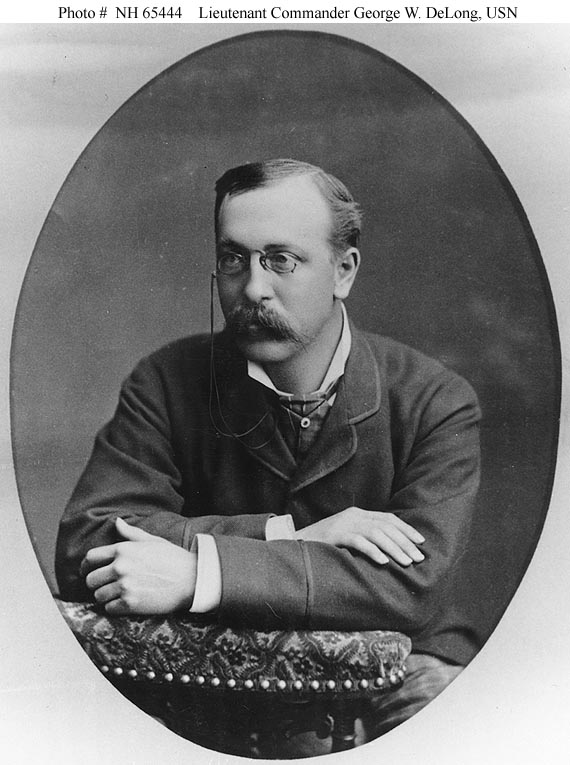
George W. DeLong

Jeannette Island, Henrietta Island, and Bennett Island were discovered in 1881 by the ill-fated Jeannette Expedition, named after the USS Jeannette, and commanded by Lieutenant Commander George W. De Long.

In August 1901, during the Russian polar expedition of 1900–1902, the Russian Arctic ship Zarya headed across the Laptev Sea, searching for the legendary Sannikov Land (Zemlya Sannikova) but was soon blocked by floating pack ice in the New Siberian Islands. During 1902 the attempts to reach Sannikov Land, deemed to be beyond the De Long Islands, continued while Zarya was trapped in fast ice. Leaving the ship, Russian Arctic explorer Baron Eduard Toll and three companions vanished forever in November 1902 while travelling away from Bennett Island towards the south on loose ice floes.

Vilkitsky Island (East Siberian Sea) and Zhokhov Island were discovered by Boris Vilkitsky during the Imperial Russian Arctic Ocean Hydrographic Expedition in 1913 and 1914 respectively. They lie slightly further south (around 76°N), are unglaciated, and lower lying.

Henrietta was the site of a research station from 1937 to 1963.

== Sovereignty ==
Some US individuals assert American ownership of Jeannette, Henrietta and Bennett Islands in the De Long group. This assertion is not supported by the US government. Following their discovery in 1881, De Long claimed these islands for the U.S. and reported to the United States Department of the Navy that a party had landed on Henrietta Island and taken possession. During 1916 the Russian ambassador in London issued an official notice to the effect that the Imperial government considered these islands were integral parts of the Russian Empire. This territorial claim was later maintained by the Soviet Union. A resolution of the Alaska State Senate in 1988 supported an American claim to the islands, but during 1994 the Alaska State Supreme Court ruled in D. Denardo v. State of Alaska that Bennett Island, along with several other islands, is not part of Alaska. The United States Department of State has asserted that claim has never been made by the United States to any of the islands, and the US recognizes it as Russian territory.

== Gallery ==
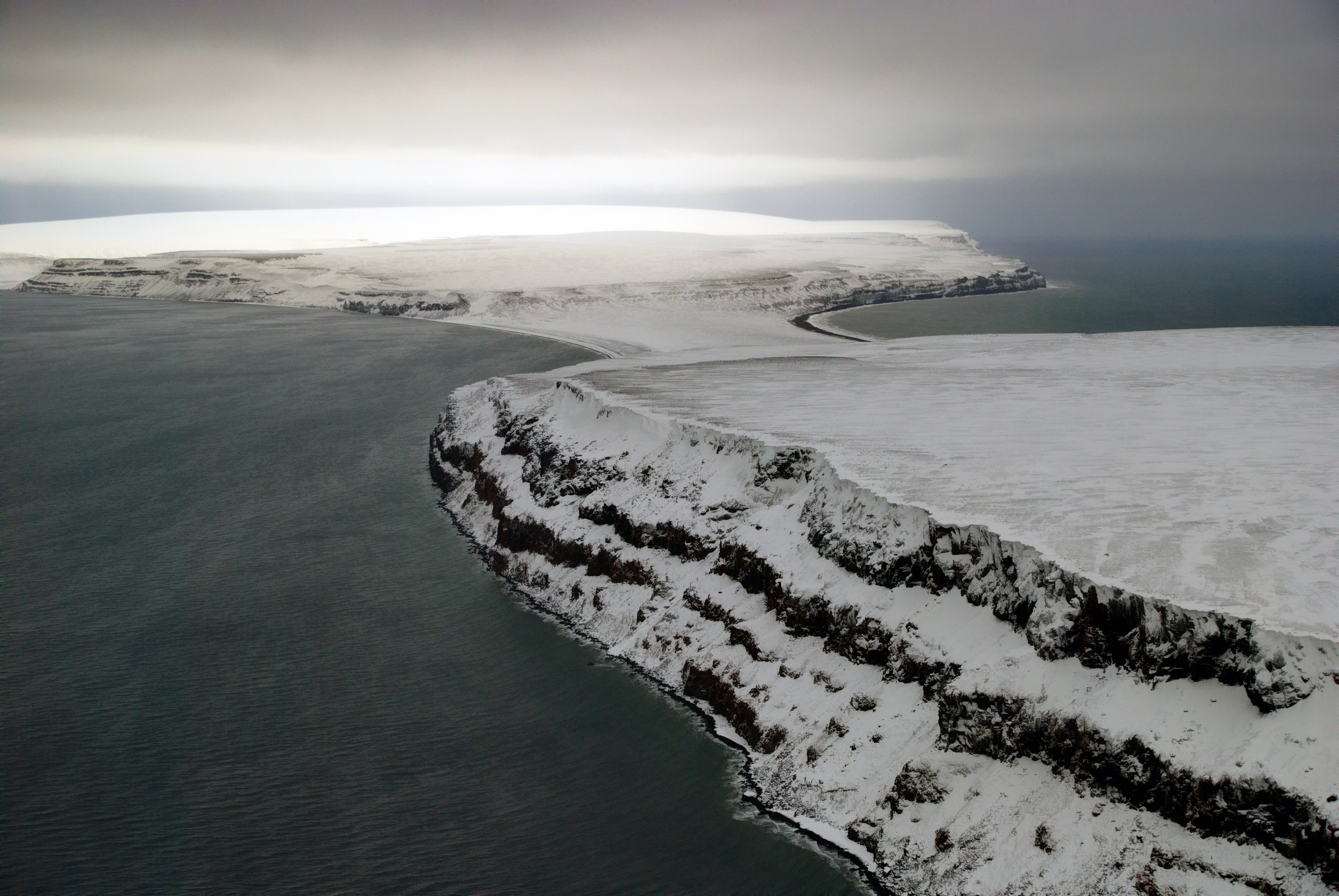
The eastern end of Bennett Island with its glaciated tombolo in the background

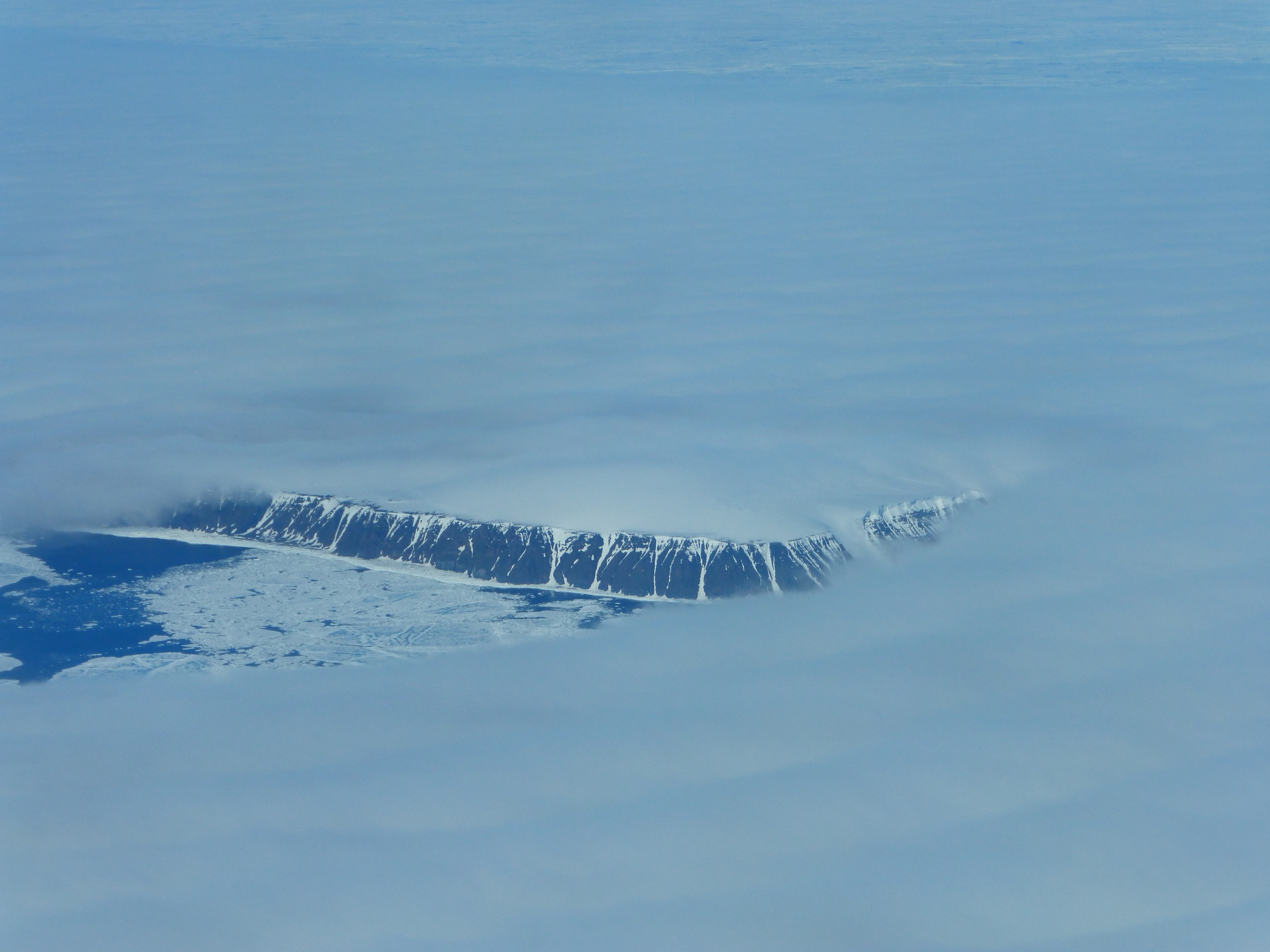
The dark coastal cliffs of Henrietta Island

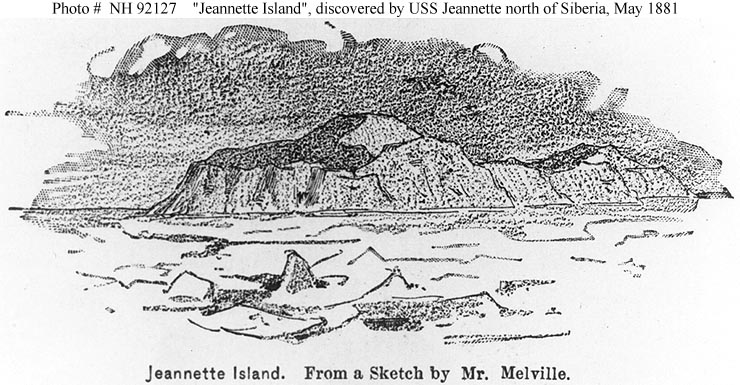
1881 drawing of Jeannette Island

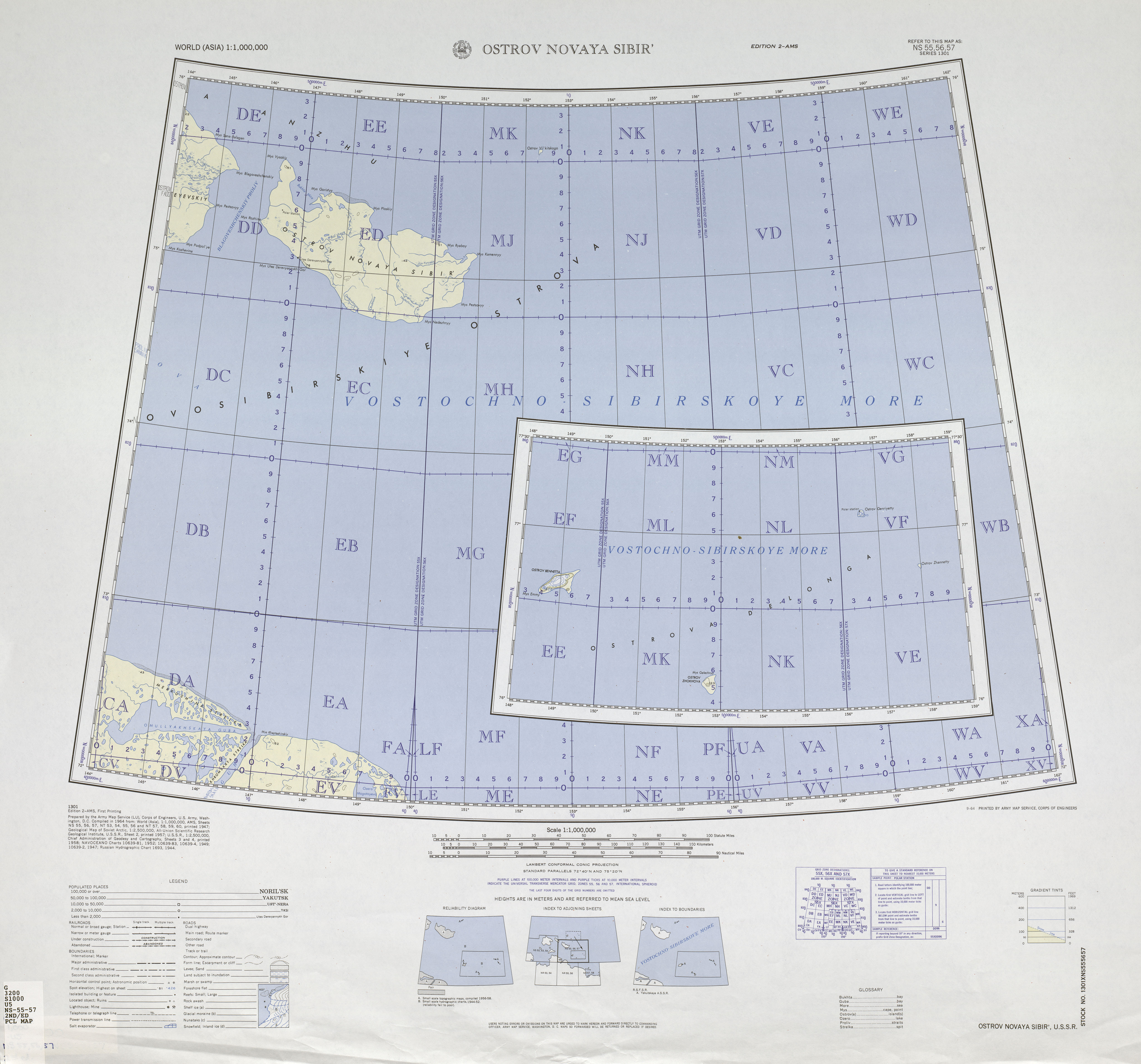
Map including the De Long Islands (inset) (AMS, 1964)

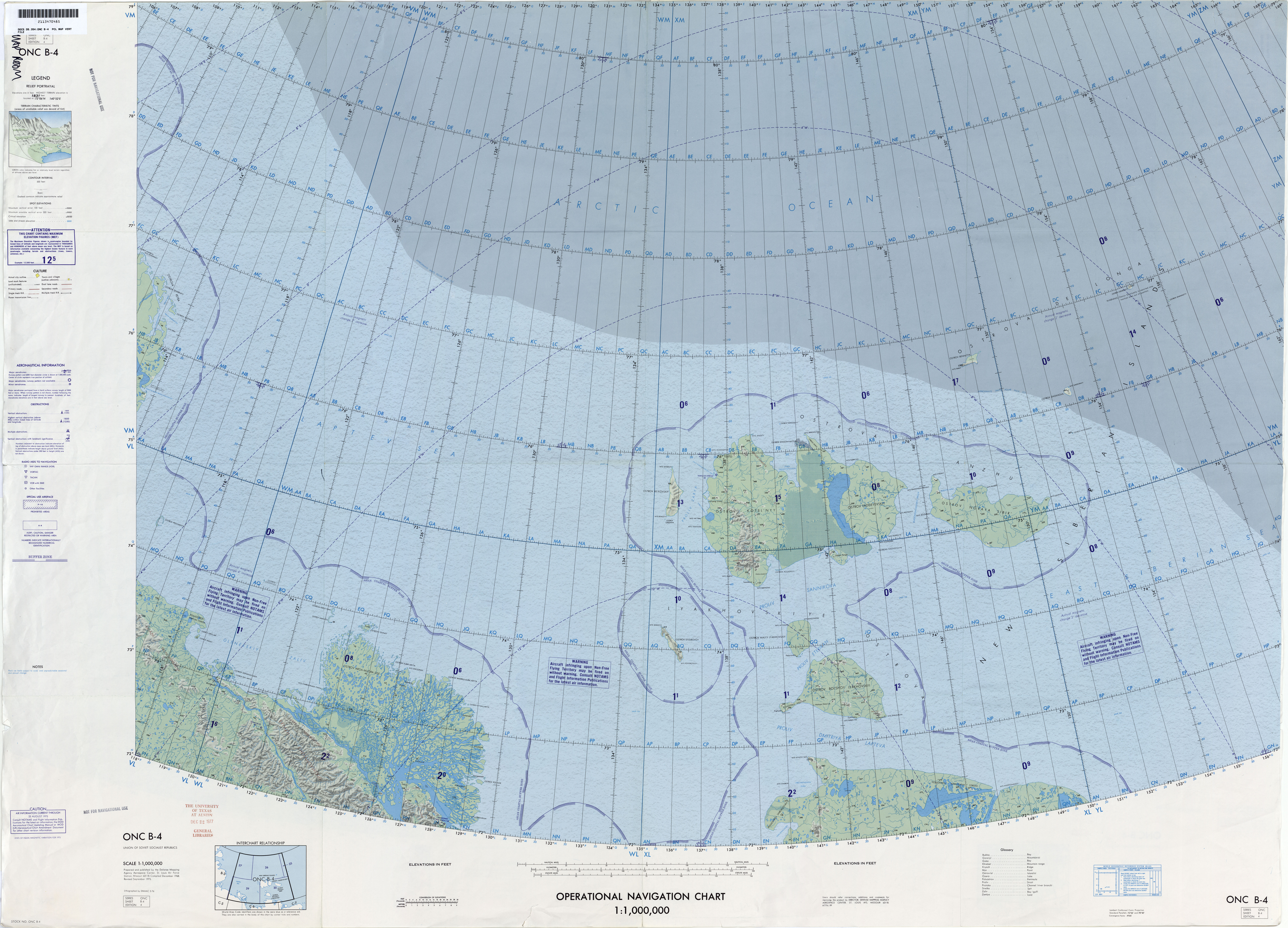
Map including the De Long Islands (DMA, comp. 1968, rev. 1975)

== See also ==
- Balagan-Tas
- List of islands of Russia
