= Bennett Island =

Island in the East Siberian Sea

Native name: Остров Бе́ннетта (Russian); Беннетт Aрыыта (Yakut)
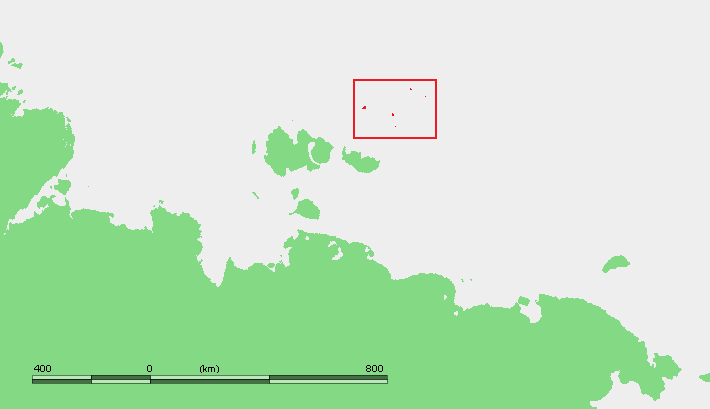

Geography
- Location: East Siberian Sea
- Coordinates: 76°42′N 149°0′E
- Archipelago: De Long Islands
- Area: 150 km^{2} (58 sq mi)
- Length: 29 km (18 mi)
- Width: 14 km (8.7 mi)
- Highest elevation: 426 m (1398 ft)
- Highest point: Mount De Long

Administration
- Russia
- Federal subject: Far Eastern Federal District
- Republic: Yakutia

Demographics
- Population: 0

Bennett Island (Russian: Остров Бе́ннетта, romanized: Ostrov Bennetta; Yakut: Беннетт Aрыыта, romanized: Bennett Arııta) is the largest of the De Long Islands in the northern part of the East Siberian Sea in North Asia. The area of this island is approximately 150 square kilometres (58 square miles) and it has a tombolo at its eastern end. The highest point of the island is 426 metres (1,398 feet) high Mount De Long, the highest point of the archipelago. Bennett Island is part of the Yakutia administrative division of Russia.

== History ==
Bennett Island was discovered by the wider world by US explorer George W. De Long in 1881, and named after the American publisher James Gordon Bennett Jr., who had financed the expedition. De Long set out in 1879 aboard the USS Jeannette, hoping to reach Wrangel Island and to discover open seas in the Arctic Ocean near the North Pole. When the ship entered an ice pack near Herald Island in September 1879 it became trapped. The vessel was crushed by the ice and sank in June 1881. At that point the party was forced to trek over the ice on foot, discovering Bennett Island during July 1881, and claiming it for the United States. They remained on the island for several days before setting out again for the New Siberian Islands and the mainland of Siberia.

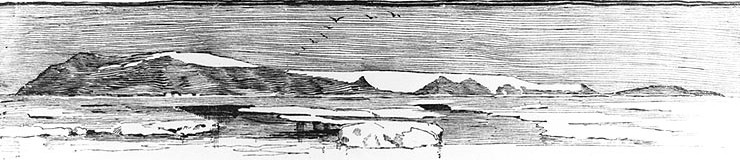
drawing of Bennett Island, discovered north of Siberia by the Jeannette Expedition, July 1881

In August 1901, Russian polar ship Zarya sailed on an expedition searching for the legendary Sannikov Land but was soon blocked by floating pack ice. During 1902 the attempts to reach Sannikov Land continued while Zarya was trapped in fast ice. Russian explorer Baron Eduard Toll and three companions vanished forever in November 1902 while travelling away from Bennett Island towards the south on loose ice floes.

In 1916, the Russian ambassador in London issued an official notice to the effect that the Imperial government considered Bennett, along with other Arctic islands, integral parts of the Russian Empire. This territorial claim was later maintained by the Soviet Union.

Some individuals assert American ownership of Bennett Island, and others of the De Long group, based on the 1881 landing. However, the United States government has never claimed Bennett Island, and recognizes it as Russian territory.

== Geology ==
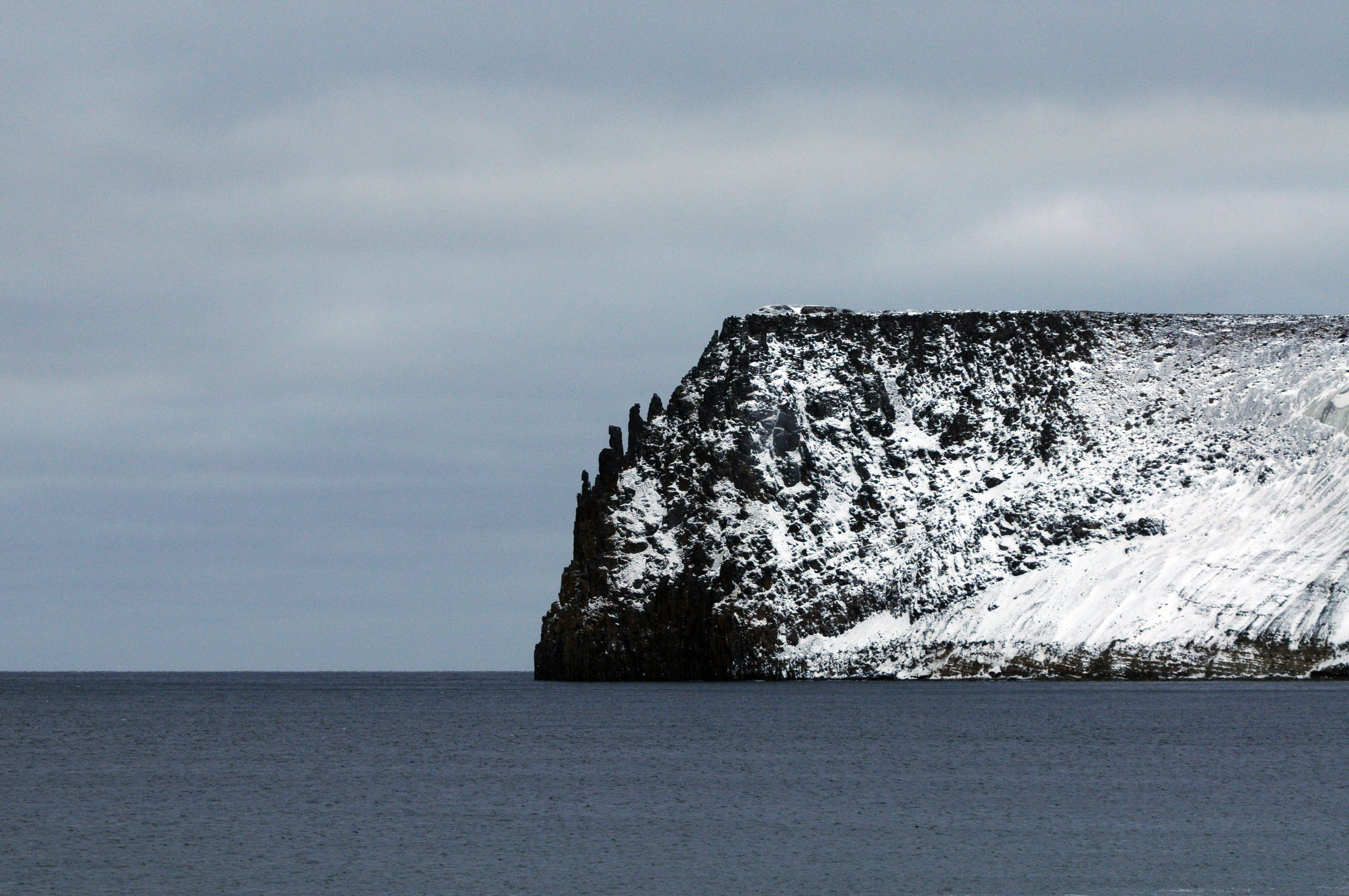
A headland on Bennett Island

Bennett Island consists of Early Paleozoic, late Cretaceous, Pliocene, and Quaternary sedimentary and igneous rocks. The oldest rocks outcropping on Bennett island are moderately tilted marine Cambrian to Ordovician sedimentary rocks. They consist of an approximately 500-metre (1,600 ft) thick sequence of argillites with minor amounts of siltstone, and limestone that contain Middle Cambrian trilobites and 1,000 to 1,200 metres (3,300 to 3,900 ft) of Ordovician argillites, siltstones, and quartz sandstones that contain graptolites. These Paleozoic rocks are overlain by Late Cretacecous coal-bearing argillites and quartzite-like sandstones and basaltic lava and tuff with lenses of tuffaceous argillite. The Late Cretaceous strata is overlain by basaltic lavas ranging in age from Pliocene to Quaternary. The Quaternary volcanic rocks form volcanic cones.

== Climate ==
Little has been published about the climatology of Bennett Island in the English language literature. Dr. Glazovskiy stated that the annual precipitation on Bennett Island varied from 100 mm (3.9 in) at sea level to 400 mm (16 in) at the crest of the Tollya Ice Cap.

== Glaciers ==
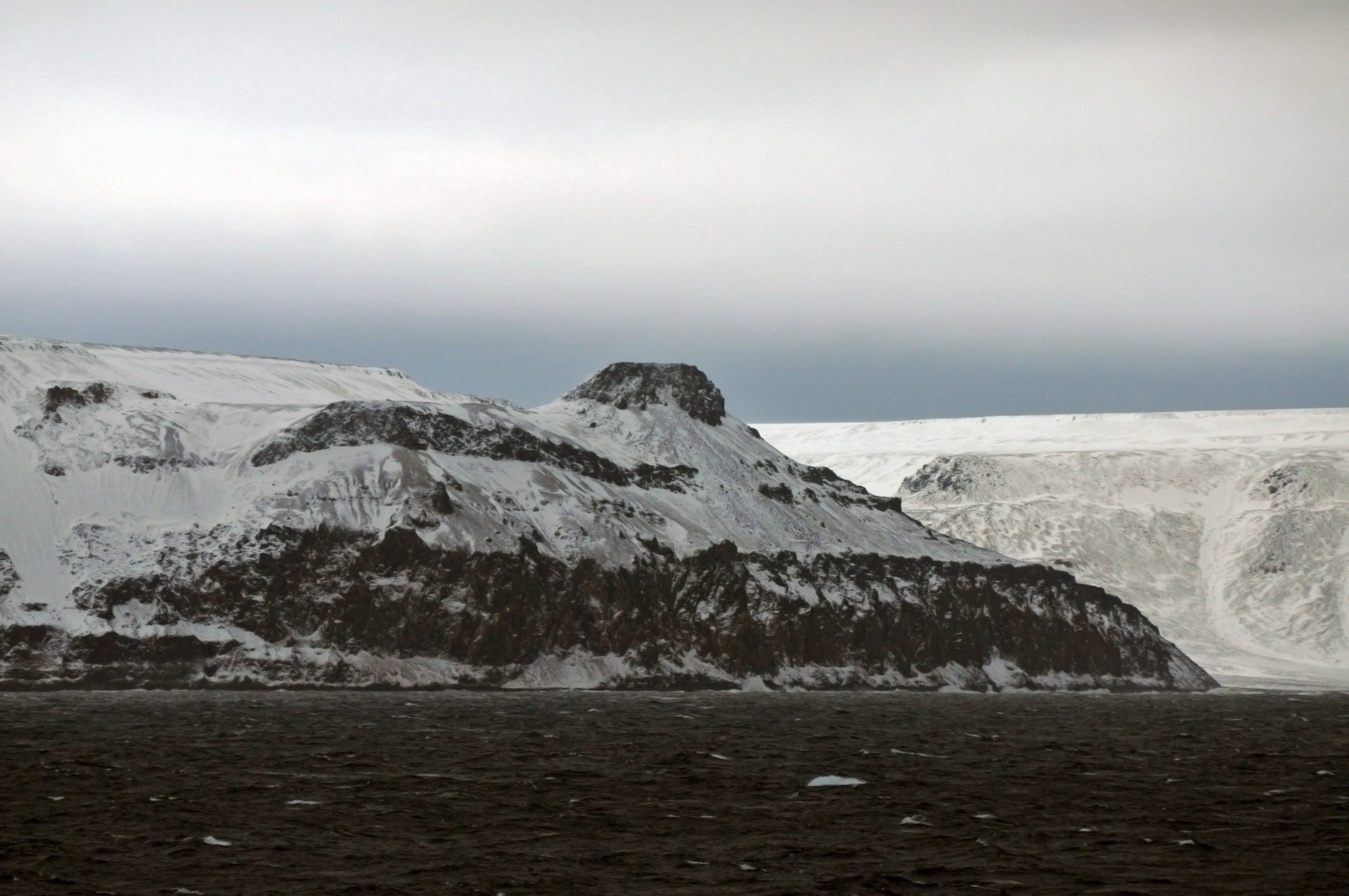
View of Bennett Island with its ice cap

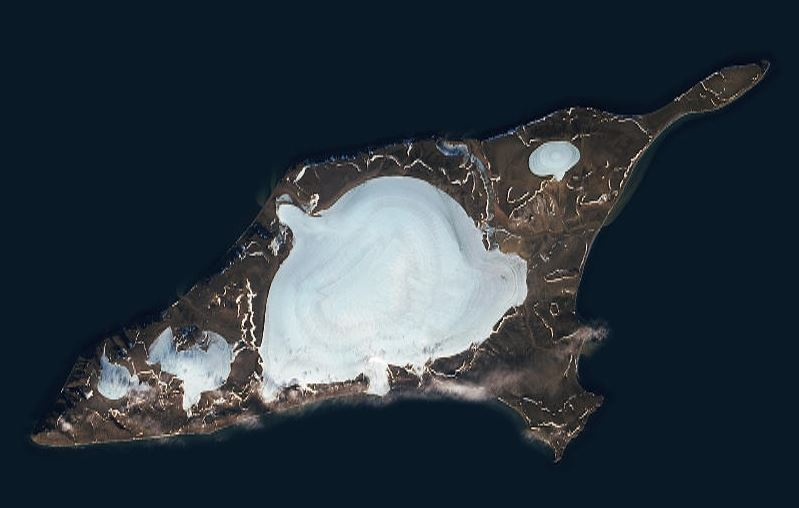
Bennett Island in NASA Landsat image

Bennett Island has the largest permanent ice cover within the De Long Islands. In 1987, the permanent ice cap of this island consisted of four separate glaciers that had a total area of 65.87 square kilometres (25.43 sq mi). All of these glaciers were perched on high, basaltic plateaus bounded by steep scarp-like slopes.

In 1992, Dr. Verkulich and others named these glaciers as the De Long East, De Long West, Malyy, and Toll glaciers. With an area of 55.5 square kilometres (21.4 sq mi) in 1987, Toll Glacier was the largest of them. It occupied the center of Bennett Island; had an elevation of 380 to 390 metres (1,250 to 1,280 ft) above mean sea level; and was 160 to 170 metres (520 to 560 ft) thick at its center. It had an outlet glacier, West Seeberg Glacier, from which ice flowed downhill from Toll Glacier into the sea. The next largest glacier was De Long East Glacier with an area of 5.16 square kilometres (1.99 sq mi) in 1987. It laid about 420 metres (1,380 ft) above mean sea level at the southeast end of Bennett Island and had a thickness of 40 to 45 metres (131 to 148 ft). Adjacent to De Long East Glacier laid the De Long West Glacier with an area of 1.17 square kilometres (0.45 sq mi); an elevation of 330 to 340 metres (1,080 to 1,120 ft) above mean sea level; and a thickness of 40 metres (130 ft) in 1987. Malyy Glacier, with an area of 4.04 square kilometres (1.56 sq mi) in 1987, occupied a basaltic plateau at an elevation of 140 to 160 metres (460 to 520 ft) above mean sea level on the northeast end of Bennett Island and was 40 to 50 metres (130 to 160 ft) thick. In 1987, all of these glaciers were shrinking in volume and had been so for the past 40 years.

Of the glaciers described by Dr. Verkulich and others, Dr. Glazovskiy discusses only the Toll Ice Cap, which Dr. Verkulich and others referred to as "Toll Glacier". In 1996, it had an area of 54.2 square kilometres (20.9 sq mi) and a mean elevation of 384 metres (1,260 ft) above sea level. Its equilibrium line altitude was at an elevation of 200 m (660 ft) above sea level.

According to Alekseev, Anisimov and Tumskoy, and Makeyev and others, the glaciers found on Bennett and other islands of the De Long Islands are remnants of small passive ice caps formed during the Last Glacial Maximum (Late Weichselian Epoch) about 17,000 to 24,000 BP. At the time that these ice caps formed, the De Long Islands were major hills within a large subaerial plain, called the Great Arctic Plain, that now lies submerged below the Arctic Ocean and East Siberian Sea.

== Vegetation ==
Rush/grass, forb, and cryptogam tundra covers the Bennett Island. It is tundra consisting mostly of very low-growing grasses, rushes, forbs, mosses, lichens, and liverworts. These plants either mostly or completely cover the surface of the ground. The soils are typically moist, fine-grained, and often hummocky.

== Atmospheric plumes and hydrothermal eruptions ==
Bennett Island plume observed in a false color

Bennett Island is notable for its associated atmospheric plumes, which have remained a mystery to atmospheric scientists for decades. From time to time, large plumes form over this island, reaching hundreds of miles in length and radiating from the northeast coast of Russia. According to recent studies, hydrothermal eruptions in the vicinity of the island are the cause of their formation, but this does not exclude other mechanisms of their origin, including meteorological ones.

=== History and versions ===
Atmospheric plumes of Bennett Island were discovered on February 18, 1983, when an image of one of them was received by the NOAA-6 satellite. On July 25, 1984, during ice reconnaissance north of the New Siberian Islands, Bennett Island was explored by a Soviet expedition. Nothing was found that would be indicative of a recent volcanic eruption. There were no visible changes on the island, including among the representatives of the local fauna. Since then, the main hypotheses for the formation of plumes have been the assumption that they are caused by volcanoes, outbursts of some gas, military tests, as well as the assumption of their meteorological origin.

Today, the version of periodic hydrothermal eruptions near the island is considered the most reliable. As of 2023, there is no documentary evidence from the surface that closely demonstrates this event. Existing medium-resolution satellite images are more likely to indicate several simultaneous surface eruptions or strong heating of a large area of the sea near the island and are not very similar to the image of a single powerful source of a steam-gas plume. In the event of any major geothermal eruption in an ice-covered sea, it is also natural to expect a polynya to form after it ends. In 2023, there are no satellite photos confirming its formation. Thus, for all its validity, the hypothesis of periodic hydrothermal eruptions still lacks observational evidence.

The most popular theory among scientists was that the plumes were formed when clathrates—methane, trapped and frozen into a crystalline structure similar to ice by a combination of low temperatures and high pressures—melted and released methane gas. These gas deposits can melt, bubble to the surface and erupt like a geyser into the atmosphere.

Due to remaining cold-war tensions, and the Soviet military's desire to protect the secrecy of submarine facilities, western scientists were only able to observe the plumes remotely via satellite. The melting permafrost/clathrate hypothesis was unable to be tested until spring of 1992, when US and Russian Scientists in Siberia were able to conduct an air-borne expedition conduct a sampling of the plume and surprisingly found no methane.

Scientists had initially dismissed the meteorological explanation of the clouds because the plumes only seemed to be unique to Bennett Island and not the other, similar islands, and because it was thought that the 1,000 foot high island was too low to generate orographic clouds. Orographic clouds normally form when air is forced to rise as it passes over a mountain and cools.

Bennett Island plumes form due to the layering of arctic air at different, very cold temperatures. The region is relatively remote, with only warmer polynyas – open water surrounded by sea ice – to potentially provide instability. When air hits the elevated Bennett Island, which behaves like an airplane air foil, it rises up, sometimes to over 3 km (2 mi), nucleates, condenses and forms a cloud. The catalyst for the generation of the plumes was difficult to pinpoint because the apparent source region of the plume can appear to shift with time depending on the weakening or intensification of the strength of the wind flowing over the mountain. Consequently, the plumes were determined to be excellent indicators of the location of arctic fronts and jet stream activity.

=== Hydrothermal eruptions ===
Analysis of satellite images from 1973 to 1986 indicated the cyclicity in the appearance of atmospheric plumes over Bennett Island. It was the reason for the opinion, that they most likely have meteorological nature, which is similar to Karman vortex streets. A total of 152 such events were recorded, one of the last of March 12, 2008, was studied separately. It turned out that it was larger than expected if it had a meteorological nature. The length of the plume was 1,000 km (621 mi), the volume exceeded 250,000 km^{3} (60,000 cu mi). Also its height 3 km (2 mi) was higher than the relief of Bennett Island. Aerosols, carbon dioxide and sulfates were found in its composition in large quantities – they are common components of volcanic eruptions are especially characteristic of hydrothermal eruptions.

The first spotted eruption of 1983 lasted 6 hours, but the duration of these events can reach several days. The volume of ejected solid material reaches 0.36 km^{3} (0.086 cu mi), which corresponds to small volcanic eruptions. Subsequent comparison of bathymetric data of seafloor topography around the island showed significant differences from the topography of the 20th century, with the appearance of new cone-shaped shoals in places that corresponded well to the location of the plume's origin. Analysis of samples of marine sediments near the island showed a recent interaction with hydrothermal solutions, since these cone-shaped formations of ferromanganese composition contain the mineral todorokite, which is common only in hot spring sediments. Thus, events with the formation of vapor-gas plumes occur in the relatively high-temperature environment of the modern hydrothermal system and are more related to hydrothermal eruptions than to volcanic ones. And by analogy with conventional geysers, the frequency of events is determined by the time it takes for the aforementioned hydrothermal system to restore water reserves and to warm it up for the next eruption.

It is assumed that one of these volcanic cones could be observed by the De Long expedition. Such volcanic formations are usually quickly destroyed by ocean waves or sea ice and do not remain on the surface for a long time.
