= Andrey Vilkitsky =

Russian hydrographer and surveyor (1858–1913)

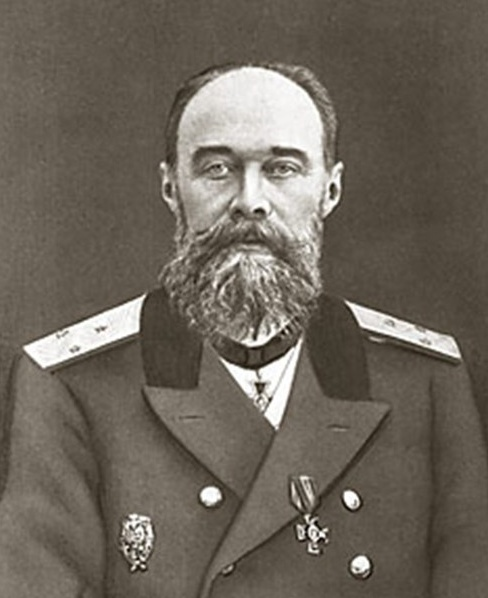
Andrey Vilkitsky

Andrey Ippolitovich Vilkitsky (Russian: Андре́й Ипполи́тович Вильки́цкий; 13 June [O.S. 1 June] 1858 – 11 March [O.S. 26 February] 1913) was a Russian hydrographer and surveyor. He was born in the Minsk Governorate. His son, Boris Vilkitsky followed up his father's work; the Vilkitsky Islands are named after him.

== See also ==
- Russian Hydrographic Service
