= Boris Vilkitsky =

Russian polar explorer (1885–1961)

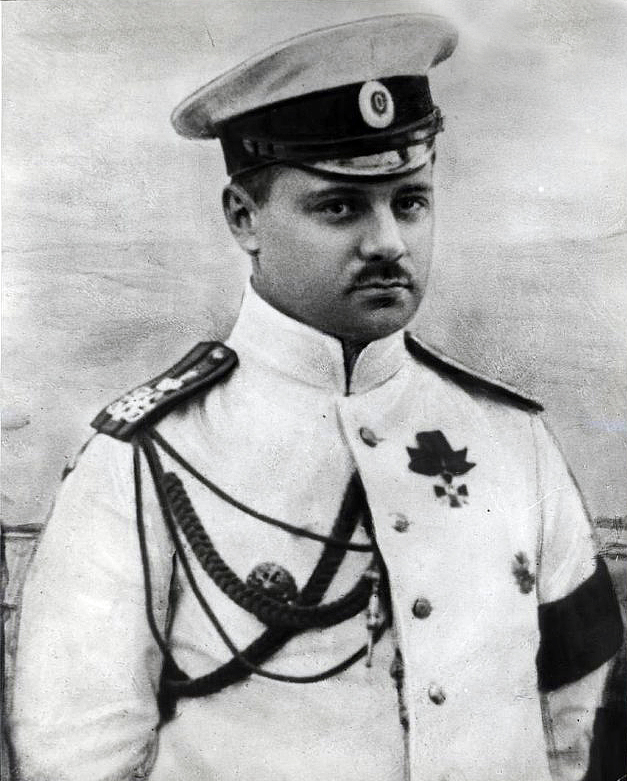
Boris Andreyevich Vilkitsky

Boris Andreyevich Vilkitsky (Russian: Бори́с Андре́евич Вильки́цкий) (22 March (3 April N.S.) 1885, Pulkovo – 6 March 1961) was a Russian hydrographer and surveyor. He was the son of Andrey Ippolitovich Vilkitsky.

== Career ==
Born in Pulkovo, Tsarskoselsky Uyezd (now part of Saint Petersburg), Vilkitsky graduated from the Naval Academy in Saint Petersburg in 1908. He participated in the Russo-Japanese War of 1904–1905. In 1913—1915 he led the Arctic hydrographic expedition on the ships "Taimyr" and "Vaigach" with the purpose of further exploration of the Northern Sea Route.

In 1913, Vilkitsky's expedition discovered Emperor Nicholas II Land (Russian: Земля Императора Николая II, Zemlya Imperatora Nikolaya II) — later renamed 'Severnaya Zemlya', perhaps one of the most important Russian discoveries in the Arctic at the time. Other discoveries were an island that now bears his name (Vilkitsky Island), as well as the islands of Maly Taymyr and neighboring Starokadomsky. In 1914–1915, Vilkitsky's expedition made the first through voyage from Vladivostok to Arkhangelsk, discovered Novopashenniy Island (now Zhokhov Island), and described the eastern coastline of the territory he named 'Emperor Nicholas II Land'. He was awarded the prestigious Constantine Medal by the Russian Geographical Society for his endeavours.

In 1918, Vilkitsky was appointed head of the first Soviet hydrographic expedition, which never took place due to its seizure by the North Russia intervention in Arkhangelsk. In 1920, Vilkitsky emigrated to Britain. In 1923 and 1924, Vilkitsky led commercial expeditions in the Kara Sea at the invitation of the Soviet foreign trade organizations.

Later in his life, Vilkitsky was employed as a hydrographer in the Belgian Congo. Boris Vilkitsky died in Brussels in 1961.

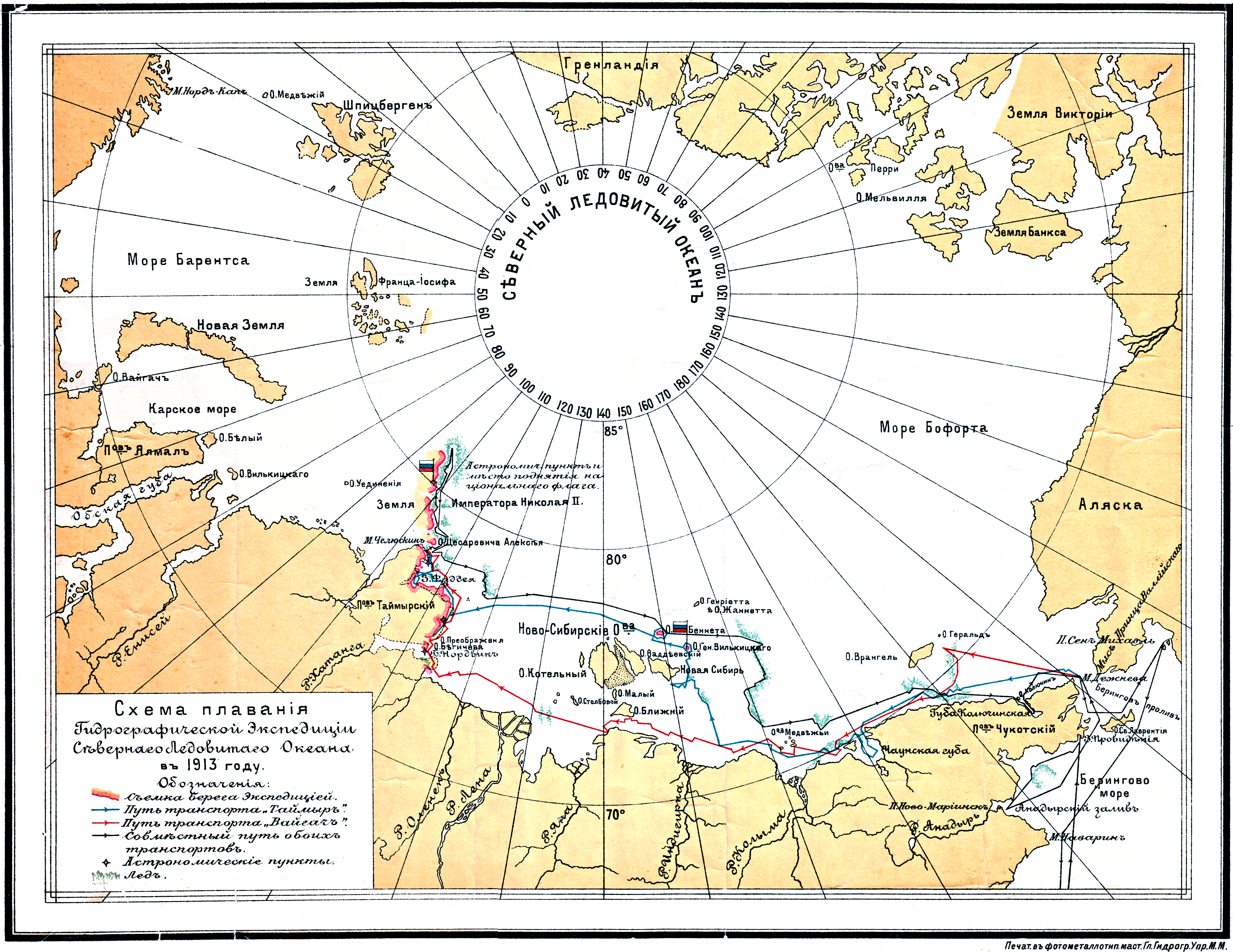
1913 Russian Hydrographic Service map showing the route of Vilkitsky's expedition.

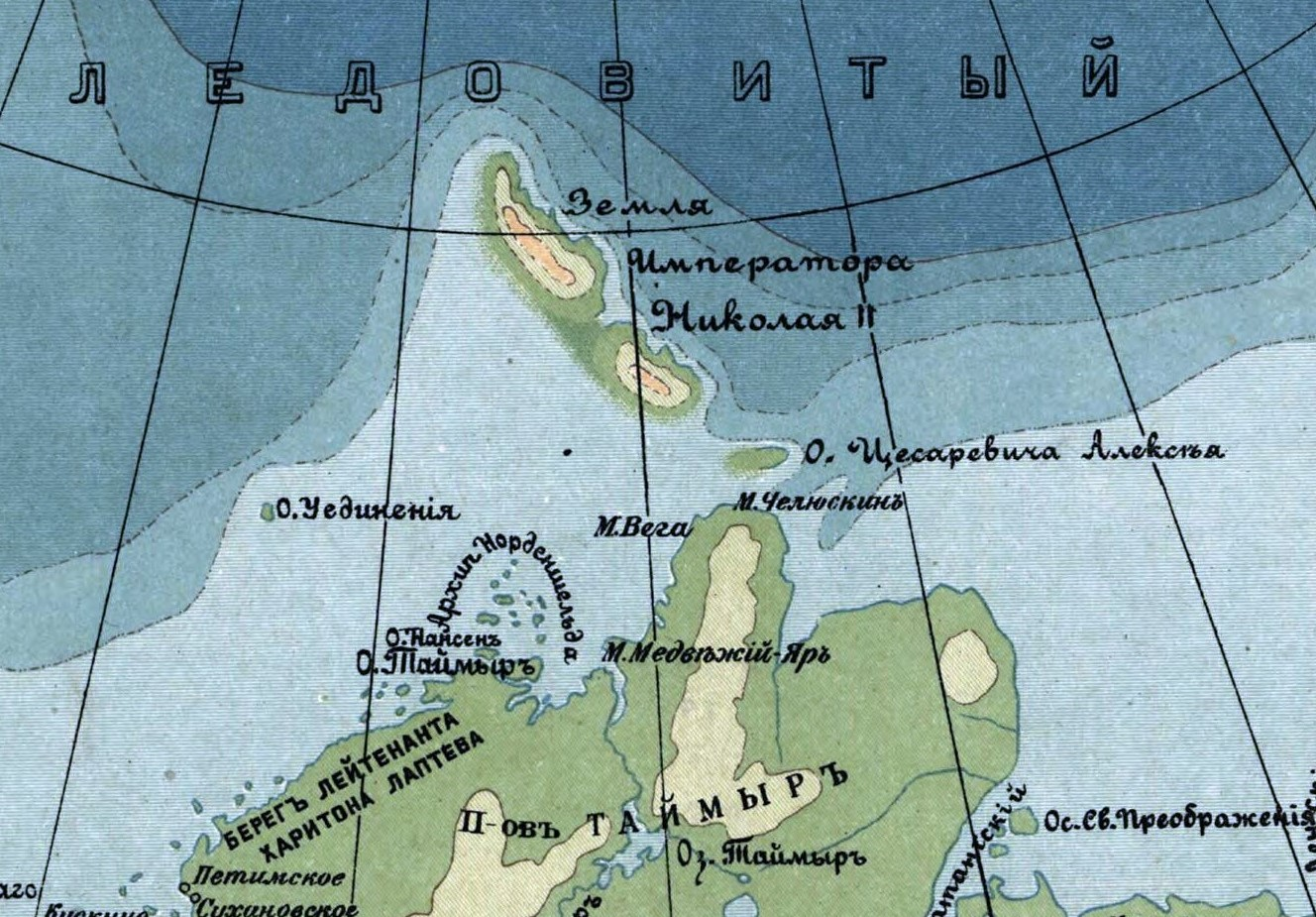
Emperor Nicholas II Land and Tsarevich Alexei Island, the still incompletely charted new territories named by Boris Vilkitsky, in a 1915 map of the Russian Empire.

== Memory ==
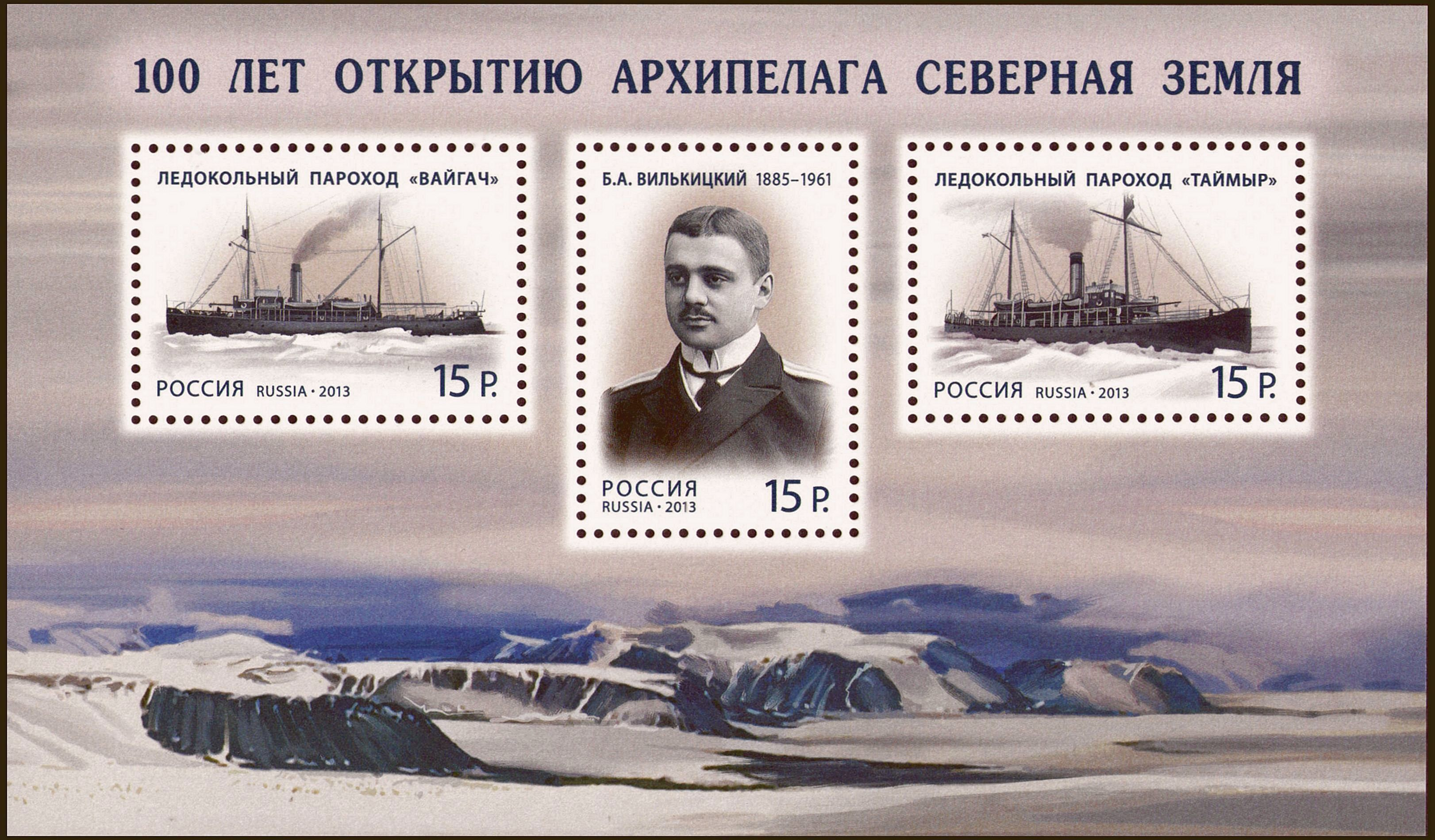
Russian 2013 stamp dedicated to the 100th anniversary of the discovery of Severnaya Zemlya

Many geographical features in Russia bear Vilkitsky's name:

- The most well-known one is Vilkitsky Strait, the strait between Severnaya Zemlya and Taimyr Peninsula, an important landmark of the Northern Sea Route.
- Zaliv Vil'kitskogo, a bay in the NW shores of Novaya Zemlya.
- Vilkitsky Island in the Kara Sea.
- The Vilkitsky Islands, a division of the Nordenskjold Archipelago.
- The Vilkitsky Islands subgroup of the Komsomolskaya Pravda Islands in the Laptev Sea off the eastern shores of the Taymyr Peninsula.
- Vilkitsky Island in the De Long Group in the Eastern Siberian Sea.

== See also ==
- Russian Hydrographic Service

== Sources ==
- The Arctic Personalities at poseidonexpeditions.com
