= Taymyr (1909 icebreaker) =

Steam-powered icebreaker

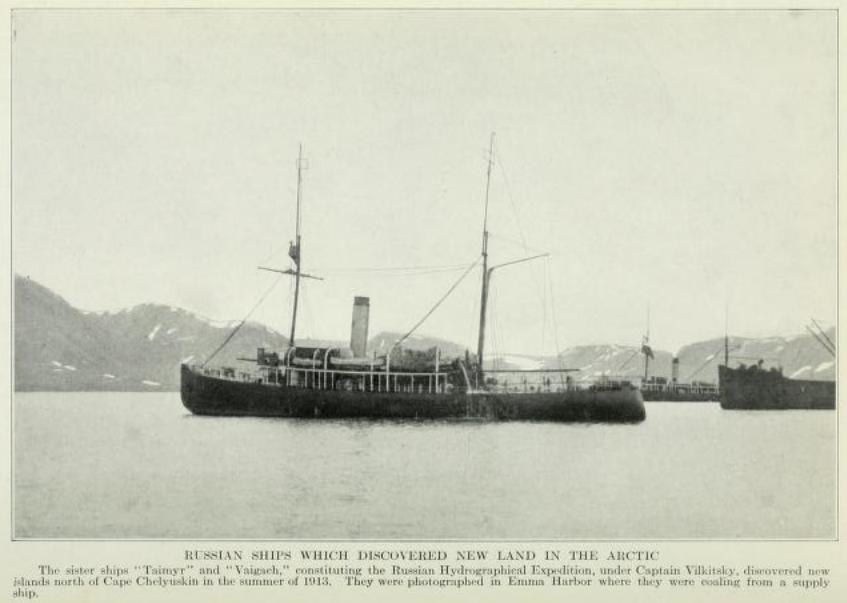
- Taymyr and Vaygach coaling from a freighter at Emma Harbor, 1913

History

Soviet Union
- Namesake: Taymyr Peninsula
- Owner: Russian Imperial Navy Soviet Navy
- Builder: Nevsky Shipyard in Saint Petersburg
- Launched: 1909
- Out of service: 1950s
- Fate: Scrapped
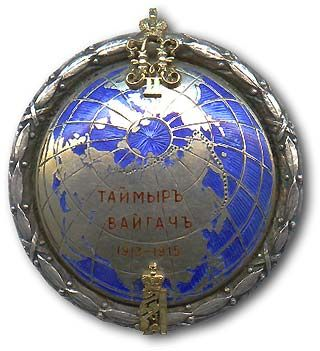
- Badge

General characteristics
- Type: Icebreaker
- Tonnage: 1,200 tons
- Displacement: 1,349 tons
- Length: 60 m (196 ft 10 in)
- Beam: 11.9 m (39 ft 1 in)
- Speed: 9 knots (17 km/h; 10 mph)

Taymyr was an icebreaking steamer of 1,200 tons built for the Russian Imperial Navy at Saint Petersburg in 1909. It was named after the Taymyr Peninsula.

Taymyr and her sister ship Vaygach were built for the purpose of thoroughly exploring the uncharted areas of the Northern Sea Route. This venture became known as the Arctic Ocean Hydrographic Expedition.

== Surveys ==
The first of a series of surveys began in the autumn of 1910, when Taymyr and Vaygach left Vladivostok. They entered the Chukchi Sea with scientists on board and began their exploration. For the next five years, these icebreakers went on sounding and carrying on vital surveys during the thaw. Before every winter, when ice conditions became too bad, they returned to Vladivostok and waited for the spring. In 1911 the scientists and crew aboard Vaygach and Taymyr made the first Russian landing on Wrangel Island.

In 1914, Boris Vilkitsky was both the captain of Taymyr and the leader of the Arctic Ocean Hydrographic Expedition. The purpose of the icebreakers Taymyr and Vaygach was to force the whole Northern Passage in order to reach Arkhangelsk. Severe weather and ice conditions, however, didn't allow them to cross the Kara Sea and they were forced to winter at Bukhta Dika, close to the Firnley Islands. Thus the sister icebreakers were able to complete the passage only in 1915. They were warmly welcomed in Arkhangelsk upon their arrival.

Some of the biggest successes of the expedition were the accurate charting of the Northern Sea Route and the discovery of Severnaya Zemlya in 1913. Taymyr and Vaygach were considered the best icebreakers in the world at the time.

The first scientific drifting ice station in the world, North Pole-1 was established on 21 May 1937 some 20 kilometres (12 mi) from the North Pole by the expedition into the high latitudes Sever-1, led by Otto Schmidt. NP-1 operated for nine months, during which the ice floe passed 2,850 kilometres (1,770 mi). On 19 February 1938, Taimyr, along with Murman took off four polar explorers from the station, who immediately became famous in the USSR and were awarded titles Hero of the Soviet Union.

== Nuclear vessels ==
A nuclear icebreaker as well as a class of nuclear-powered river icebreakers was named Taymyr in 1988.

== See also ==
- Russian Hydrographic Service
