= East Siberian Sea =

Marginal sea in the Arctic Ocean north of Siberia

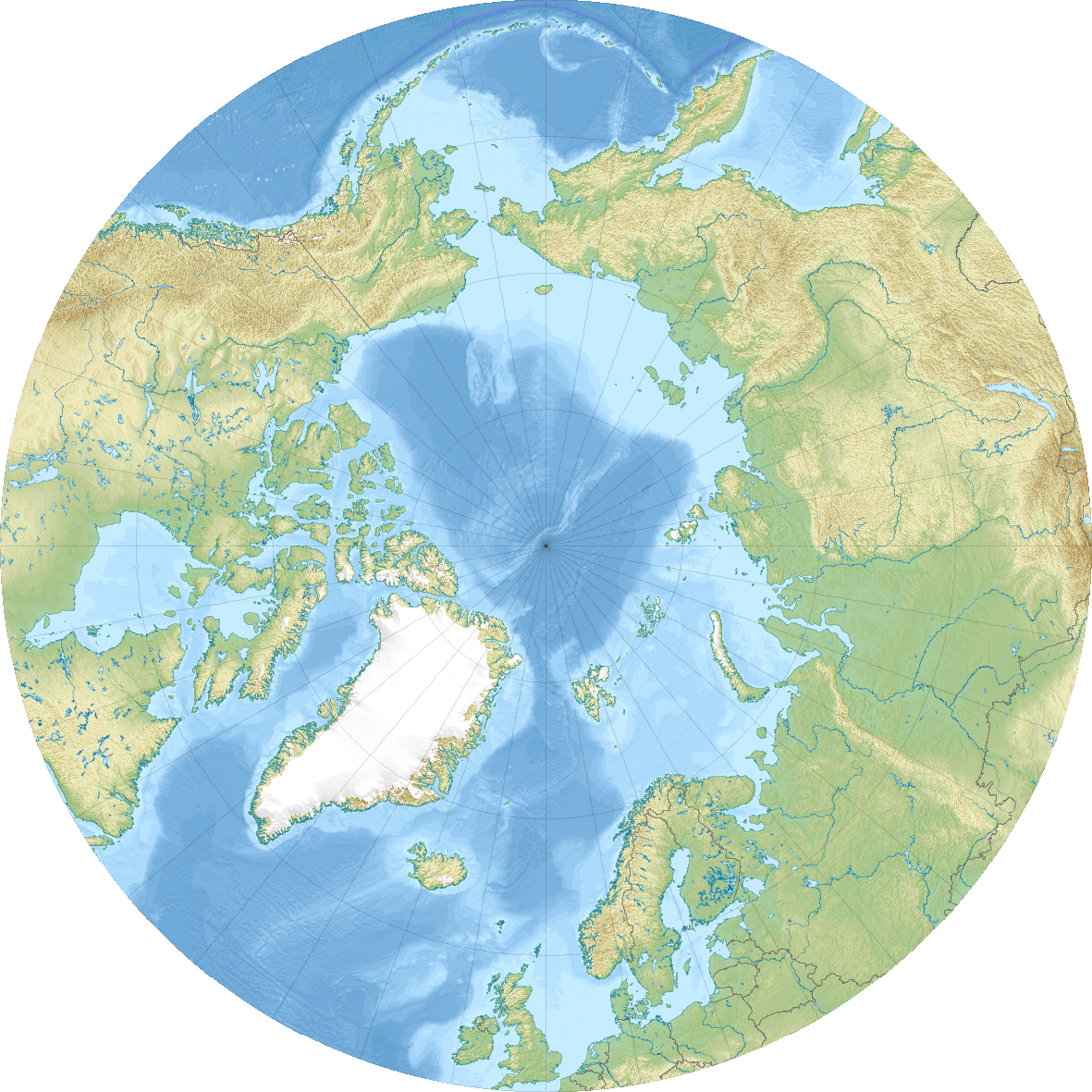
- Location within Arctic

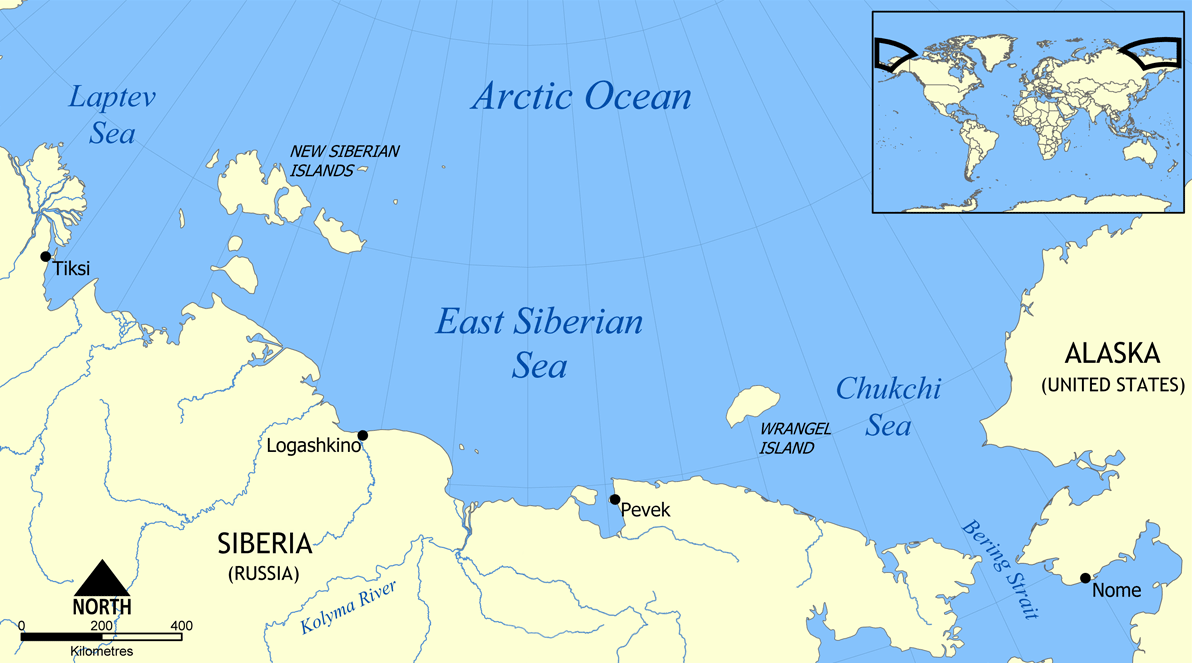
- Coordinates: 72°N 163°E
- Type: Sea
- Basin countries: Russia
- Surface area: 987,000 km^{2} (381,000 sq mi)
- Average depth: 66 m (217 ft)
- Max. depth: 915 m (3,002 ft)
- Water volume: 57,000 km^{3} (4.6×10^{10} acre⋅ft)
- Frozen: Most of the year

The East Siberian Sea (Russian: Восто́чно-Сиби́рское мо́ре, romanized: Vostochno-Sibirskoye more; Yakut: Илин Сибиирдээҕи байҕал, romanized: İlin Sibiirdeeği bayğal) is a marginal sea in the Arctic Ocean. It is located between the Arctic Cape to the north, the coast of Siberia to the south, the New Siberian Islands to the west and Cape Billings, close to Chukotka, and Wrangel Island to the east. This sea borders on the Laptev Sea to the west and the Chukchi Sea to the east.

This sea is one of the least studied in the Arctic area. It is characterized by severe climate, low water salinity, and a scarcity of flora, fauna and human population, as well as shallow depths (mostly less than 50 m), slow sea currents, low tides (below 25 cm), frequent fogs, especially in summer, and an abundance of ice fields which fully melt only in August–September. The sea shores were inhabited for thousands of years by indigenous tribes of Yukaghirs, Chukchi and then Evens and Evenks, which were engaged in fishing, hunting and reindeer husbandry. They were then absorbed by Yakuts and later by Russians.

Major industrial activities in the area are mining and navigation within the Northern Sea Route; commercial fishing is poorly developed. The largest city and port is Pevek, the northernmost city of mainland Russia.

== Name ==
The present name was assigned to the sea on 27 June 1935 by Decree of the Soviet Government. Before that, the sea had no distinct name, and a variety of names were interchangeably used to refer to it in Russia, including Indigirskoe, Kolymskoe, Severnoe (Northern), Sibirskoe and Ledovitoe (Icy).

== Geography ==
=== Extent ===
The International Hydrographic Organization defines the limits of the East Siberian Sea as follows:

On the West. The Eastern limit of Laptev Sea [From the Northern extremity of Kotelni Island – through Kotelni Island to Cape Madvejyi. Then through Malyi Island, to Cape Vaguin on Great Liakhov Island. Thence to Cape Sviaroy Noss on the main land].

On the North. A line from the Northernmost point of Wrangel Island (179°30'W) to the Northern sides of the De Long Islands (including Henrietta and Jeannette Islands) and Bennett Island, thence to the Northern extremity of Kotelni Island.

On the East. From the Northernmost point of Wrangel Island through this island to Cape Blossom thence to Cape Yakan on the main land (176°40'E).

=== Topography ===
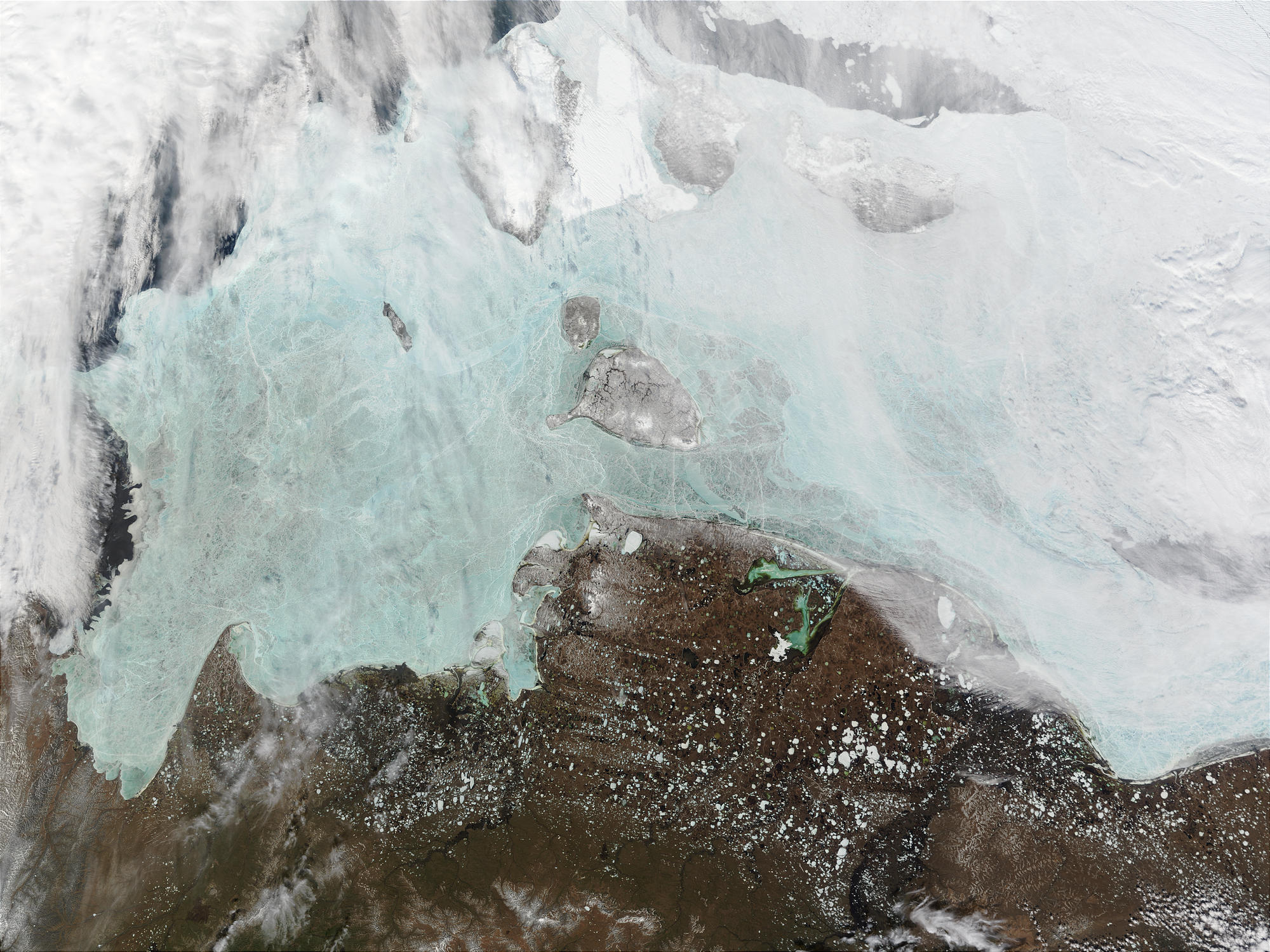
Satellite photo of the New Siberian Islands, with the Laptev Sea on the left and part of the East Siberian Sea shown on the right.

Because it is open towards the Arctic Ocean in the north, the main gulfs of the East Siberian Sea, like the Kolyma Bay, the Kolyma Gulf and the Chaunskaya Bay, are all located in its southern limits. There are no islands in the middle of the East Siberian Sea, but there are a few islands and island groups in its coastal waters, like Ayon Island and the Medvyezhi island group. The total area of the islands is only 80 km^{2}. Some islands mostly consist of sand and ice and gradually erode.

The total catchment area is 1,342,000 km^{2}. Among the rivers flowing into the East Siberian Sea, the Indigirka, Alazeya, Chukochya, Kolyma, Rauchua, Chaun, and Pegtymel are the most important. Only a few rivers are navigable. The coastline of the sea is 3,016 km long. It makes large bends, sometimes stretching deep into the land, and has a rather different topography in the eastern and western parts. Fine bends are rare and occur only in the river deltas. The coastal section between the New Siberian Islands and the mouth of the Kolyma River is uniform, with low and slowly varying slopes. It extends landwards to the marshy tundra filled with numerous small lakes. In contrast, the coast to the east of the Kolyma River is mountainous, with steep cliffs.

The underwater topography of the shelf that forms the seabed is a plain, sloping from southwest to northeast, covered in a mixture of silt, sand and stones and lacking significant depressions and elevations. About 70% of the sea is shallower than 50 m, with predominant depths of 20–25 m. North-east to the mouth of the Kolyma and Indigirka rivers, there are deep trenches on the seabed, which are attributed to the ancient river valleys, now submerged by the sea. The region of small depths in the western part forms the Novosibirsk shoal. The greatest depths of about 915 m are found in the north-eastern part of the sea.

The East Siberian Sea is bound to the south by the East Siberian Lowland, an alluvial plain mainly composed of sediments of marine origin dating back to the time when the whole area was occupied by the Verkhoyansk Sea, an ancient sea at the edge of the Siberian Craton in the Permian period. As centuries went by, gradually, most of the area limiting the sea, as well as the contiguous Laptev Sea to the south became filled with the alluvial deposits of modern rivers.

=== Climate ===
The climate is polar and is influenced by the continent and Atlantic and Pacific oceans. In winter, it is mostly affected by the continent. South-westerly and southerly winds having the speeds of 6–7 m/s (15 mph, 25 km/h) bring cold air from Siberia, so the average temperature in January is approximately −30 °C. The weather is calm, clear and stable with occasional intrusions by cyclones. Atlantic cyclones increase the wind speed and air temperature whereas Pacific ones bring clouds, storms and blizzards.

The winds blow from the north in summer; they are weak in June, strengthen to 6–7 m/s (15 mph, 25 km/h) in July and reach 10–15 m/s (33 mph, 50 km/h) in August, making the western part of the sea one of the most violent areas on the northern Russian coast. The southeastern part is however much calmer. Northerly winds result in the low average temperatures of 0–1 °C in the open sea and 2–3 °C on the coast in July. Skies are usually cloudy, with frequent drizzling rains or wet snow. Along the coasts, fogs occur 90–100 days per year, mostly in summer (68–75 days). Precipitation is low at 100–200 mm per year, but it is still larger than the evaporation volume.

=== Hydrology ===
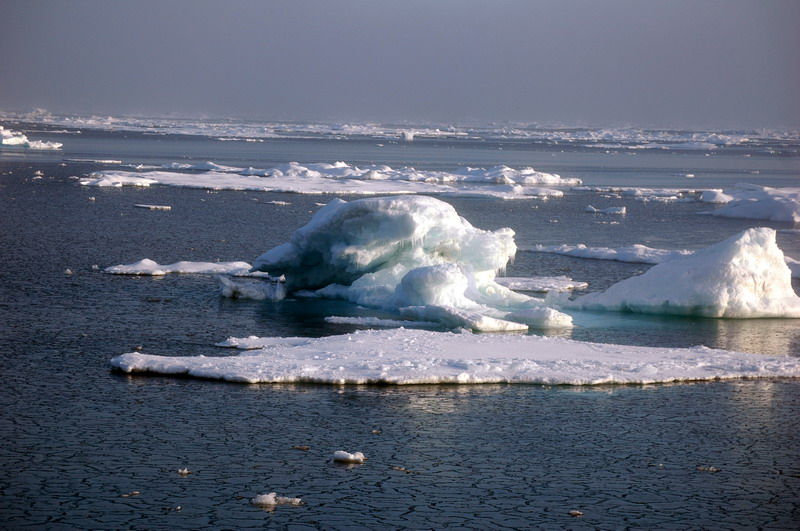
Ice in the East Siberian Sea

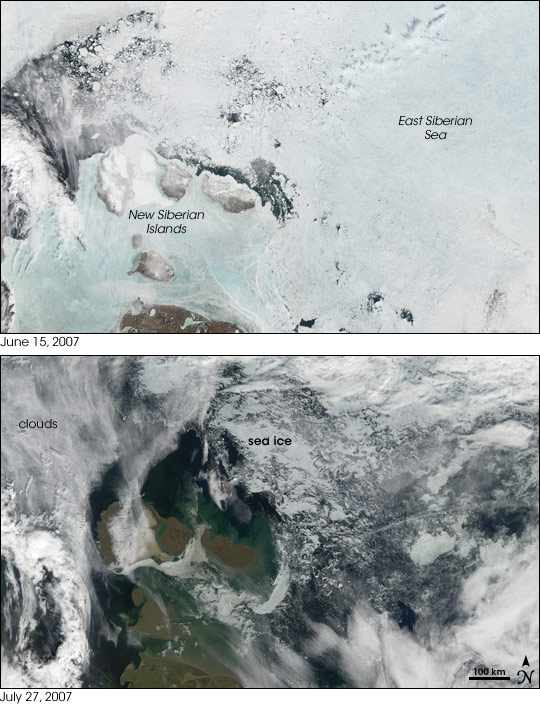
Sea ice retreat in the East Siberian Sea. Top: 15 June 2007, bottom: 27 July the same year.

The continental runoff into the East Siberian Sea is relatively small at about 250 km^{3}/year that makes only 10% of the total runoff in all the Arctic seas of Russia. The largest contribution is from the Kolyma River at 132 km^{3}, followed by the Indigirka River at 59 km^{3}. Most runoff (90%) occurs in summer; it is concentrated near the coast, owing to the weak river currents, and therefore does not significantly affect the sea hydrology. The water exchange between the neighboring seas is as follows. The annual outflow to the Laptev Sea, Chukchi Sea and Arctic Ocean is 3,240, 6,600 and 11,430 km^{3}, respectively; while the respective inflow values are 3,240, 8,800 and 9,230 km^{3}.

The surface water temperature decreases from south to north. In winter it varies between −0.2 and 0.6 °C at the river deltas and from −1.7 to −1.8 °C in the northern sea part. In summer, it warms to 7–8 °C in the bays and inlets and to 2–3 °C in the ice-free sea zones.

Surface water salinity increases from southwest to northeast. In winter and spring, it is 4–5‰ (parts per thousand) near the deltas of the Kolyma and Indigirka rivers. It increases to 28–30‰ in the sea centre, reaching 31–32‰ at its northern outskirts. Salinity decreases in summer by some 5‰ due to the snow melting. It also decreases by some 5–7‰ from the sea bottom to the surface.

There are constant currents at the sea surface directed from west to east. They are weak and thus can temporarily change direction due to the wind. The tides are semidiurnal (rising twice a day) with the amplitude between 5 and 25 cm. The tidal wave weakens toward the coast due to shallow waters. The sea level is maximal in summer, due to the river runoff, and in autumn due to the winds. It is the lowest in March–April, with the total annual fluctuations within about 70 cm. Winds bring storms with waves reaching 3–5 m in the western part whereas the eastern regions are relatively calm. The storms typically last 1–2 days in summer; they are more frequent in winter and may extend up to 3–5 days.

The sea freezes over between October–November and June–July. The ice is continuous and stationary near the coast, reaching the thickness of 2 m by the end of winter; The thickness decreases from west to east. Further into the sea, the ice cover transforms into drifting ice having the thickness of 2–3 m. The southern winter winds shift this ice northwards, making polynyas near the sea centre. There are no icebergs in the sea. Ice melting typically starts around May, first around the delta of the major Kolyma River.

In absence of industry, sea water is rather clean. Minor contaminations are found near the Novosibirsk and Wrangel islands (up to 80 μg/L), due to occasional oil spills, and in Chaunskaya Bay due to the local thermal power station and activities at the major port Pevek.

== Flora and fauna ==
Flora and fauna are relatively scarce due to the harsh climate. The summer plankton bloom is short but intense, producing 5 million tonnes of plankton in August and September, whereas the annual production is 7 million tonnes. The nutrients in water are mostly provided by river discharges and coastal erosion. The plankton species are dominated by the Pacific species of copepods.

The sea shores and icefields host ringed seals (Phoca hispida), bearded seals (Erignathus barbatus) and walruses (Odobenus rosmarus) along with their predator, polar bear (Ursus maritimus). Birds include seagulls, uria and cormorants. Sea waters are often visited by bowhead whale (Balaena mysticetus), gray whale (Eschrichtius robustus), beluga (Delphinapterus leucas) and narwhal (Monodon monoceros). Major fish species are grayling and Coregonus (whitefishes), such as muksun (Coregonus muksun), broad whitefish (Coregonus nasus) and omul (Coregonus autumnalis). Also common are polar smelt, saffron cod, polar cod, flounder and Arctic char.

== History ==
The coast of the East Siberian Sea was inhabited for ages by the native peoples of northern Siberia such as Yukaghirs and Chukchi (eastern areas). Those tribes were engaged in fishing, hunting and reindeer husbandry, as reindeer sleds were essential for transportation and hunting. They were joined and absorbed by Evens and Evenks around the second century and later, between ninth and 15th centuries, by much more numerous Yakuts. All those tribes moved north from the Baikal Lake area avoiding confrontations with Mongols. Whereas they all practised shamanism, they spoke different languages.

The sea was navigated by Russian sea-farers, moving from one river mouth to another in their kochs as early as the 17th century. In 1648, Semyon Dezhnev and Fedot Alekseev sailed the coast of the East Siberian Sea from the Kolyma to river Anadyr in the Bering Sea. Systematic exploration and mapping of the sea and its coasts was carried out by a series of expeditions in 1735–42, 1820–24, 1822, 1909 and 1911–14.

In the 1930s, the coastal settlement of Ambarchik, located at the delta of the Kolyma River, was used as a transient labor camp from which prisoners were transported to other northern camps of the Gulag system. While stationed at Ambarchik, prisoners were employed to build most of the port infrastructure and to unload the incoming ships. Later, due to shallow waters, the shipping was gradually transferred to Chersky in the lower reaches of the Kolyma, in order to accommodate larger vessels. As a result of this transfer, the port and settlement have been abandoned. Nowadays, Ambarchik only hosts a meteorological station operated by a few staff members.

Another two labour camps of the Gulag system were later opened near Pevek, namely Chaunlag (1951–1953) and Chaunchukotlag (1949–1957). Both contained about 10,000 inmates used in the mine and construction works.

== Human activities ==
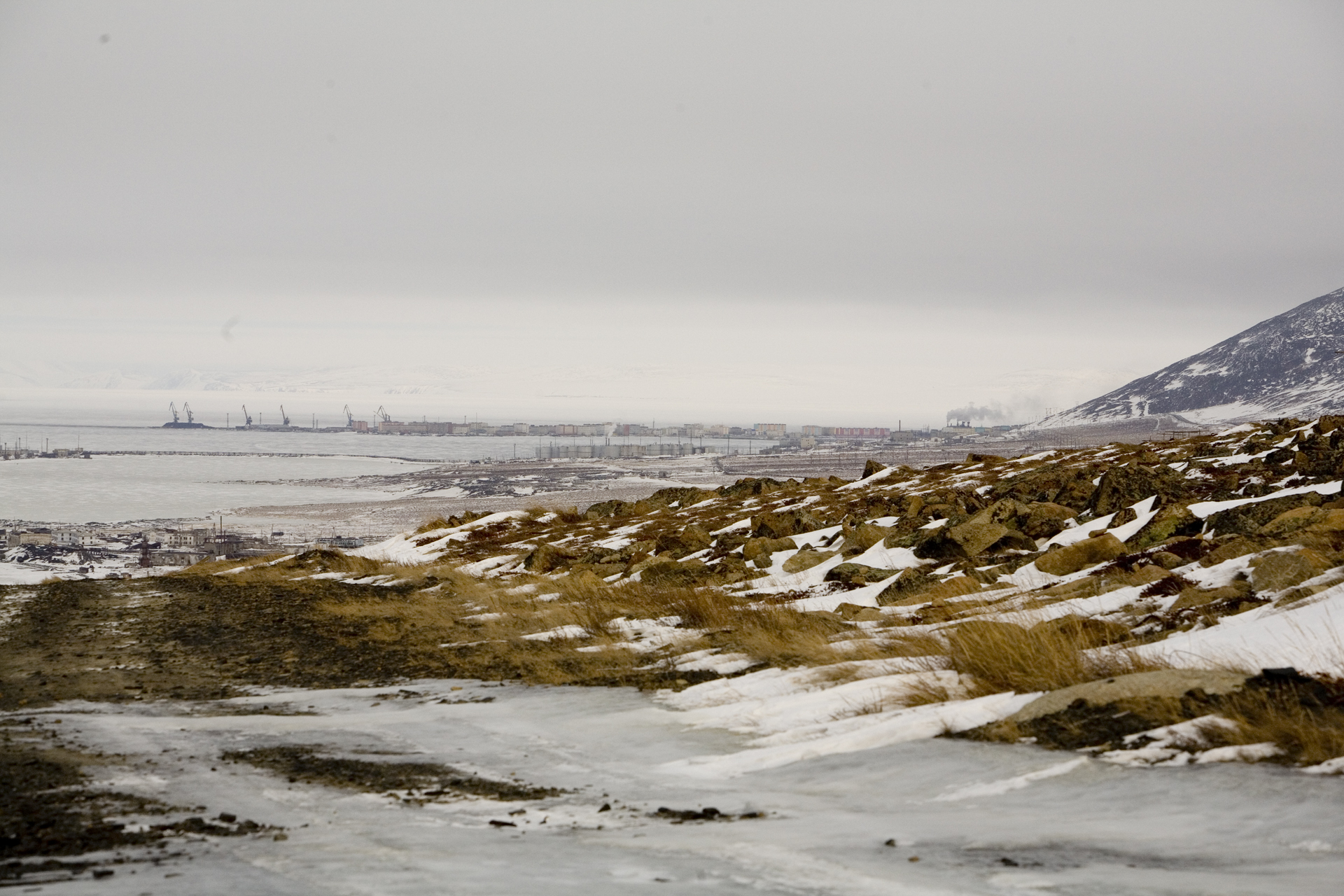
View of Pevek

The southern coast of the sea is shared by the Sakha Republic on the west and Chukotka Autonomous Okrug of Russia on the east. The coastal settlements are few and small, with the typical population below 100. The only city is Pevek (population 5,206), which is the northernmost city in Russia. There are gold mines near Leningradsky and Pevek, but many mines have been closed recently, for example, tin mines at Pevek in the 1990s, that resulted in outflow of population. So, the Logashkino settlement, which used to be a notable East Siberian Sea port, was abolished in 1998.

The sea is used mostly for transportation of goods across the northern coast of Russia during August–September. The navigation is hindered even in summer by the remaining floating ice which is also brought down to the southern shores by occasional winds. Fishery and hunting of marine animals is still practised as traditional activities, but has only local importance. Fishery mostly targets salmon, halibut and crab. Data exist on fish production, which in 2005 was distributed, in thousand tonnes as follows: sardine (1.6), Arctic cisco (1.8), Bering cisco (2.2), broad whitefish (2.7), Muksun (2.8) and others (3.6).

The principal port is Pevek (in the Chaunskaya Bay) After the breakup of the Soviet Union, commercial navigation in the Arctic went into decline. Nowadays, more or less regular shipping occurs only between Pevek and Vladivostok. Ports in the northern Siberian coast located between Dudinka and Pevek see next to no shipping at all.

In 1944, the Chaunskaya Thermal Power Plant began providing most electricity for the Chukotka region of Pevek via its combined 30 MW thermal power station of coal-burning facilities. It is ageing and consumes much oil which has to be brought from far away. Therefore, there was a project to replace the station by a floating 70 MW atomic power station by 2015. (First project failed) The Bilibino NPP’s first stage was commissioned in 1974 and its second in 1976, operating for more than half a century in the permafrost zone. By the time all four units were shut down(Jan 2026), they had operated for a total of more than 190 reactor-years, supplying over 11.6 TWh of electricity. Bilibino NPP comprised four unique 12 MWe uranium-graphite pressure-tube EGP-6 reactors commissioned between 1974 and 1976. The EGP-6 reactor (Energeticheskii Geterogennii Petlevoi Reaktor) is a scaled-down version of the larger RBMK design, that uses graphite as a moderator and light water for cooling with natural circulation, making it suitable for remote, permafrost regions. The decision to close the reactors was approved in March 2016. Unit 1 was shut down in 2018 and used fuel from the reactor core has been transferred to the holding pool. In 2004, the operating life of unit 2 was extended for 15 years. The used fuel from power units 2-4 will also be removed to the station cooling pools over the next two years, but the status of the Bilibino NPP as an operating nuclear facility will remain, according to nuclear utility Rosenergoatom.

For the Rosenergoatom Concern, the shutdown of all power units at the Bilibino NPP is the first experience of a complete shutdown of a nuclear power plant in industrial operation. Despite the fact that all four units are closed, the station will continue to operate in generation-free mode,” said Bilibino NPP Director Konstantin Kholopov. “The substitution of energy capacities is being undertaken by the Floating Nuclear Thermal Power Plant (FNPP), located in Pevek (Chukotka), and heat for the city is generated by the new Energy Centre.”

A floating nuclear power plant, Akademik Lomonosov, is located in Pevek. It started commercial operation in May 2020. It has two small reactors that generate 35 megawatts of electricity each. In January 2026, Russia’s one-off low-capacity floating nuclear power plant (FNPP) Akademik Lomonosov was noted as having supplied its first billion kilowatt-hours of electricity to the isolated Chaun-Bilibino power grid in Chukotka. Akademik Lomonosov is the only operating offshore nuclear station and the northernmost nuclear thermal power plant in the world. The FNPP is intended, among other things, to supply electricity for the full-scale deployment of mining operations at a new mining site. The total power it can feed into the onshore grid of the town of Pevek is 70 MW (when no heat is supplied to the shore) or about 44 MW (when the heat output is at maximum). As of 2026, Akademik Lomonosov accounts for over 60% of power generation within the isolated Chaun-Bilibino grid, and increases its power output year after year. The population of Pevek is 5,000 but the FNPP has the potential to supply electricity to a city with a population of up to 100,000. FNPP Deputy Director for HR Management Natalia Tarasova claims that in 2025, for the first time ever, the FNPP was refueled, noting the challenges of doing so in Arctic conditions.

== See also ==
- Chief Directorate of the Northern Sea Route
- Eduard Toll
- Northern Sea Route
- List of seas
- Siberian Shelf
- Reindeer in Russia
- Allaikhovsky District
