= Vaygach (1909 icebreaker) =

Russian icebreaker sunk in 1918

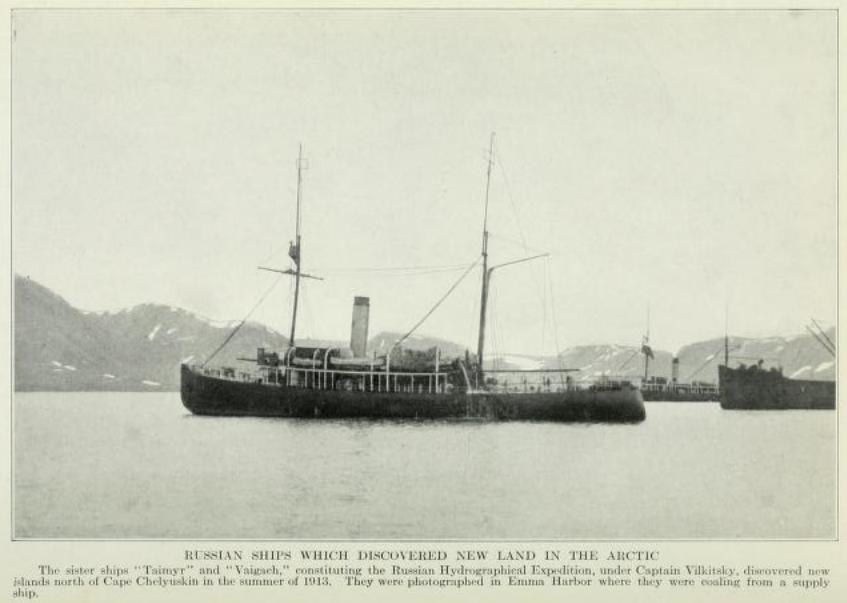
- Taymyr and Vaigach coaling from a freighter at Emma Harbor, 1913

History

Russia
- Namesake: Vaygach Island
- Launched: 1909
- Fate: Sank 1918
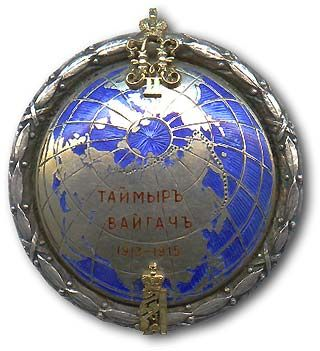
- Badge

General characteristics
- Type: Icebreaker

Icebreaker Vaygach (Russian: Вайгач) was an icebreaking steamer of moderate size built for the Russian Imperial Navy at Saint Petersburg in 1909. She was named after Vaygach Island in the Russian Arctic.

Vaygach and her sister ship Taymyr were built for the purpose of thoroughly exploring the uncharted areas of the Northern Sea Route. This venture became known as the Arctic Ocean Hydrographic Expedition.

The first of a series of surveys began in the autumn of 1910, when Vaygach and Taymyr left Vladivostok. They entered the Chukchi Sea with scientists on board and began their exploration. For the next five years, these icebreakers went on sounding and carrying on vital surveys during the thaw. Before every winter, when ice conditions became too bad, they returned to Vladivostok and waited for the spring. In 1911 the scientists and crew aboard Vaygach and Taymyr made the first Russian landing on Wrangel Island.

In 1914, led by Colonel I. Sergeev, Vaygach sailed together with Taymyr, whose captain was Boris Vilkitsky. Together, they tried to force the whole Northern Passage in order to reach Arkhangelsk. Severe weather and ice conditions, however, did not allow them to cross the Kara Sea and they were forced to winter at Bukhta Dika, close to the Firnley Islands. Thus they were able to complete the passage only in 1915.

Some of the biggest successes of the expedition were the accurate charting of the Northern Sea Route and the discovery of Severnaya Zemlya in 1913. Taymyr and Vaygach were considered the best icebreakers in the world at the time.

== Fate ==
Vaigach struck an underwater rock and sank in 1918 in the Yenisei Bay of the Kara Sea. A nuclear river-icebreaker was named Vaygach in 1989.

== See also ==
- Russian Hydrographic Service
