= Engineer Loess =

Holocene geologic formation found in Central Alaska

- Stratigraphic range: Holocene; 0.0105–0.0 Ma
- Type: Geological formation
- Unit of: Alaska muck or Alaska silt (informal)
- Sub-units: Wilber, Jarvis, White River ash beds
- Underlies: ground surface
- Overlies: Goldstream Formation
- Thickness: 1 to 12 m (3.3 to 39.4 ft)

Lithology
- Primary: loess
- Other: volcanic ash

Location
- Coordinates: 64°50′37″N 147°43′23″W
- Region: unglaciated central Alaska
- Country: United States of America
- Extent: Yukon and Tanana river drainage basins, Alaska.

Type section
- Named for: Engineer Creek.
- Named by: Troy L. Péwé

The Engineer Loess is a Holocene geologic formation in central Alaska that consists of a 1–12 m (3.3–39.4 ft) thick layer of massive, unconsolidated eolian (wind-blown) silt known as loess. It contains three, thin beds of white vitric [[]volcanic ash]] known, from youngest to oldest, as the Wilber, Jarvis, White River ash beds. The Engineer Loess typically blankets the middle slopes of valleys within the unglaciated central Alaska, especially the Fairbanks region and the Tanana River drainage basin. It disconformably overlies the Goldstream Formation and grades laterally downslope into the Ready Bullion Formation.

Vertebrate fossils are scarce within it and fossils of extinct vertebrate taxa are absent. Forest layers of white spruce stumps occur in its upper part in exposures along the Delta River Radiocarbon dates from it indicate that the Engineer Loess gradually accumulated between 10,500 years ago and present.

The Engineer Loess is named for its type location, which is the highwall of Dawson Cut gold placer mine on Engineer Creek near its confluence with Goldstream Creek. The type section lies within the SW1/4 sec.6, T1N R1E, 10 km (6.2 mi) west of Fairbanks, Alaska.

== Nomenclature ==
In the late 1800s and early 1900s, geologists recognized that a thick, 15–61 m (49–200 ft) or more, blanket of organic-rich, silty sediments blanketed bedrock and Pliocene gold-bearing fluvial gravels along the Yukon River and its tributaries. Where exposed in conspicuously high bluffs along the banks of streams and rivers, these sediments contained Pliocene and mostly Pleistocene vertebrate fossils. In 1898, Spurr proposed the name, Yukon Silt, to these silty, often either clayey or organic-rich, sediments. In 1892, Dall and Harris applied the name Kowak Clays to the same fine-grained sediments.

It was not until the 1940s that geologists, archaeologists, and paleontologists studied these organic-rich, silty sediments in any detail. By this time, the names Yukon Silt and Kowak Clays, had fallen into disuse. In place of these names, some of these researchers informally designated these sediments informally as either muck or Alaska muck. At that time, muck was, and still is, an popular term used by local miners and geologists to describe typically dark gray to black silt, which contains a considerable quantity of plant remains, lenses of ice, permafrost, and thin beds of peat and volcanic ash that directly overlie gold-bearing fluvial gravels. Still other researchers, informally designated the suite of sediments as Alaska silt.

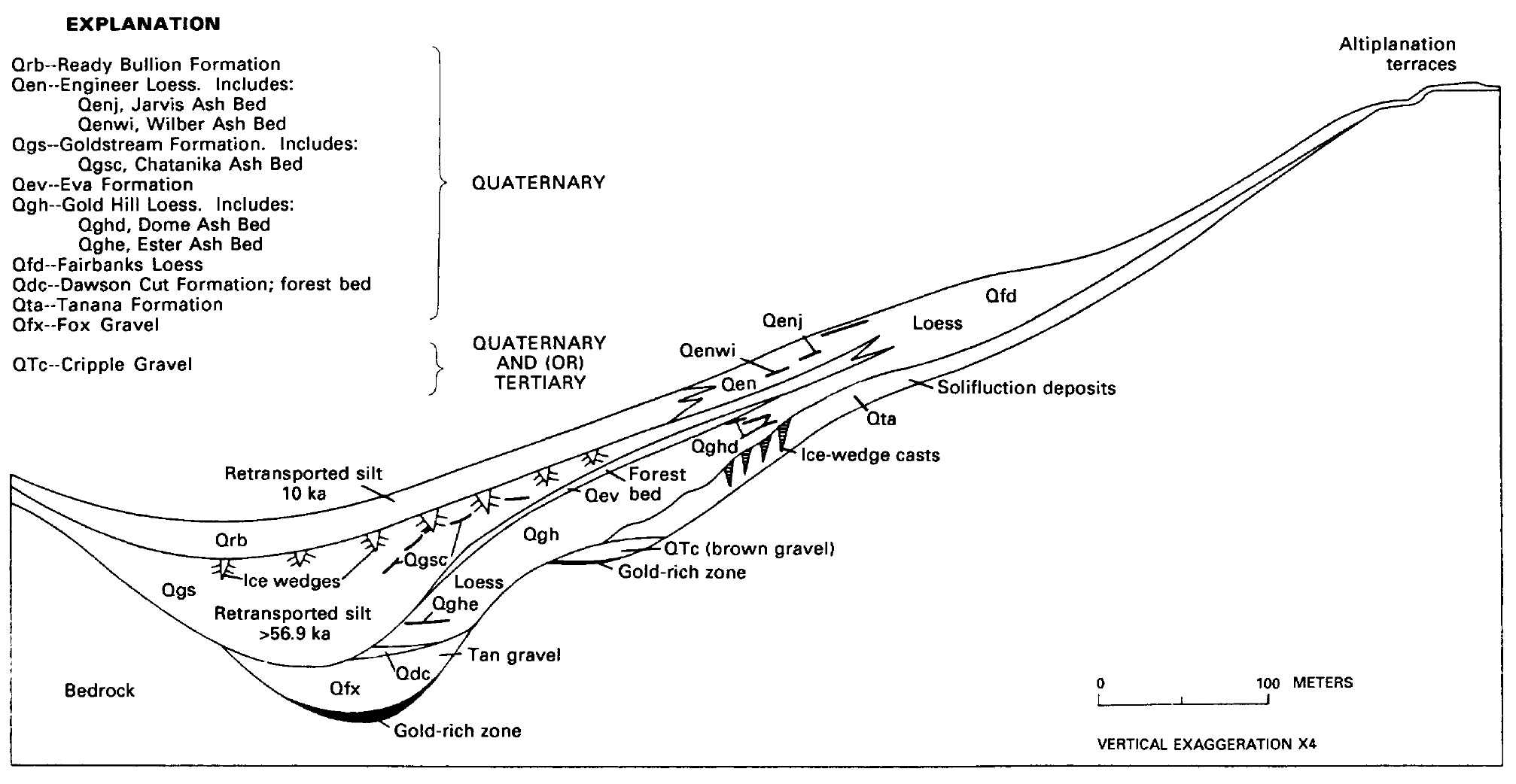
Schematic composite cross section of creek valley near Fairbanks illustrating stratigraphic relations of Goldstream Formation and associated Quaternary deposits.

In the summers of 1946, through 1949, and 1951, Péwé studied and mapped in the field the geomorphology and Quaternary Geology of the Fairbanks, Alaska, region within the Tanana River valley and Yukon-Tanana Upland. As a result of this combined United States Geological Survey and doctorate research, he subdivided the Alaska muck (Alaska silt) into five informal stratigraphic units. From oldest to youngest, they are the (1) auriferous gravel, (2) Dawson muck, (3) Fairbanks loess, (4) Goldstream muck, (5) Gold Hill loess, and (5) Engineer muck. During this time, the names Engineer muck and Engineer formation were used informally by researchers. for reworked silt in valley bottoms and later for the Holocene equivalent of the Fairbanks Loess on middle slope.

After years of additional detailed field research and geologic mapping for the United States Geological Survey, Péwé formally subdivided the obsolete Alaska muck and Alaska silt terminology into formal geologic formation and defined them according to the rules of stratigraphic nomenclature. These geologic formations include the Ready Bullion Formation (Holocene), Engineer Loess (Holocene), informal Gibbons forest bed (Holocene), Goldstream Formation (Wisconsin), Eva Formation (forest bed)(Sangamon), Gold Hill Loess (PreSangamon to Pliocene), and Dawson Cut Formation (forest bed)(Pliocene), Tanana Formation (Pliocene), Fox Gravel (Pliocene) and Cripple Gravel (Pliocene). The Fairbanks Loess was formally named the upland silts.

== Description ==
The Engineer Loess consists of largely homogenous and unbedded loess. Locally, it consists of weakly bedded slightly retransported loess. The Engineer Loess is composed of well-sorted quartz, feldspar, and mica silt with less than ten percent clay. Locally, it is calcareous. It is buff to gray-tan when dry, and brown when wet. It is locally stained by iron and mottled by carbonaceous matter. It's lower part is perennially frozen. In the vicinity of Fairbanks, Alaska, it ranges in thickness from 1 to 7 m (3.3 to 23.0 ft) thick. In the middle and upper Tanana valleys adjacent to its source braided, glacial streams, it is as much as 12 m (39 ft)thick. The Engineer Loess contains three named volcanic ash beds, the Wilber, Jarvis, and White River ash beds. Locally, a fourth, unnamed, ash bed has been reported. The Engineer Loess is the uppermost subdivision of a 15–61 m (49–200 ft) thick layer of Late Pliocene to Holocene sediments that blanket the valley walls of the rivers of central Alaska. accumulated between 10,500 years ago and present.

== Contacts ==
The Engineer Loess disconformably overlies the Goldstream Formation and grades laterally downslope into the Ready Bullion Formation. Upslope and away from the major valleys, it merges with the upper part of the Fairbank Loess. In the middle slope of river major valleys, it forms the ground surface in which the modern soil is developed.

== Paleontology and Paleonbiology ==
Fossils are scarce in the Engineer Loess. The most common fossils found in it are fossil pulmonate snails (land snails). For example, land snails have been found 70 km (43 mi) west of Fairbanks in exposures of this loess along the Tanana River. In addition, three species of land snails, Succinea avara, Discus chronkhitei, and Euconulus fulcus alaskensis, have been collected from bluffs along the Delta River. In the Engineer Loess, fossils of extent vertebrates are scarce and fossils of extinct vertebrates are entirely absent. Plant fossils are typically absent. However, multiple forest layers of well-preserved white spruce stumps have been observed within the upper part of the Engineer Loess along the Delta River.

== See also ==
- List of fossiliferous stratigraphic units in Alaska
- Yedoma
