= Gold Hill Loess =

Fossiliferous Pliocene-Pleistocene geologic formation found in Central Alaska

- Stratigraphic range: pre-Sangamonian Stage; 0.13–3.00 Ma
- Type: Geological formation
- Unit of: Alaska muck or Alaska silt (informal)
- Underlies: Goldstream Formation or Eva Formation
- Overlies: Cripple Gravel, Fox Gravel, Tanana Formation, or pre-Quaternary bedrock
- Thickness: maximum of 55 m (180 ft)

Lithology
- Primary: perennially frozen loess and silt
- Other: volcanic ash

Location
- Coordinates: 64°50′37″N 147°43′23″W
- Region: central Alaska, .
- Country: United States of America
- Extent: Tanana River drainage basin, Alaska.

Type section
- Named for: Gold Hill
- Named by: Troy L. Péwé

The Gold Hill Loess is a geologic formation in Alaska that consists of green, brown or tan massive loess. It contains several well dated volcanic ash beds. The maximum thickness of the Gold Hill Loess is up to 55 m (180 ft) thick. On bases of volcanic ash beds and two major internal unconformities, Gold Hill Loess is informally divided into upper, middle, and lower subdivisions. It unconformably overlies either the Cripple and Fox gravels, the Tanana Formation, or pre-Quaternary bedrock. It also unconformably underlies the Eva and Goldstream formations. It is the lateral, downslope equivalent the lower part of the Fairbanks Loess. In Alaska, the Gold Hill Loess Formation represents a discontinuous, but important, record of high-latitude, pre-Sangamonian fossil faunas, paleoenvironments, paleosols, and distal volcanism.

== Nomenclature ==
During the late 1800s and early 1900s, field geologists discovered that a blanket of silty, often clayey, organic-rich, massive to weakly bedded sediments that flank both sides of the Yukon River and its tributaries. These fine-grained sediments are as much as 15–60 m (49–197 ft), or more, thick and overlie bedrock and gold-bearing stream gravels. Where cut into by streams and rivers and gold mining operations, they form steep bluffs. These sediments were found to contain Pleistocene and, possibly Pliocene, terrestrial vertebrate and invertebrate fossils. In 1892, the name Kowak Clays was proposed for these sediments. In 1898, the name Yukon Silt was also applied to the same set of fine-grained sediments. Both terms were used to designate to the entire thickness of silty sediments overlying gold-bearing gravels on either side of the Yukon River and its tributaries until being abandoned after 1937.

After 1937, the silty sediments that were named either Yukon Silt or Kowak Clays became known informally as either muck or Alaska muck in the published literature. Muck is an informal term used by miners and geologists in the Arctic to refer to predominately dark gray to black silt, which contains a quantity of plant remains, vertebrate fossils, lenses of ice, permafrost, and thin beds of peat and volcanic ash that directly overlie gold-bearing fluvial gravels. Instead of muck, still other researchers used the informal term Alaska silts for the same silty sediments. The term upland silt designated loess deposits blanketing the upland terrain that grade laterally downslope into muck and accumulated contemporaneously with it.

Starting in 1936, Giddings recognized and studied buried forest beds found at various levels within the muck (Yukon Silt or Kowak Clays) deposits. This research started while he was employed for the Fairbanks Exploration Company's placer gold mining operations along Engineer Creek, 16 km (9.9 mi) north of Fairbanks, Alaska. Within the muck deposits, Gibbons mapped four, laterally persistent beds composed of buried spruce forests at different depths below its surface. Within the muck, the oldest forest grew on a buried surface just above the top of the gold-bearing gravels and the youngest buried forest grew on a buried surface 1.5 to 3.5 m (4.9 to 11.5 ft) below the pre-mining, modern surface. Using tree rings, he was able to construct separate floating, or undated, dendochronologies for each level of buried spruce forest found within the local muck.

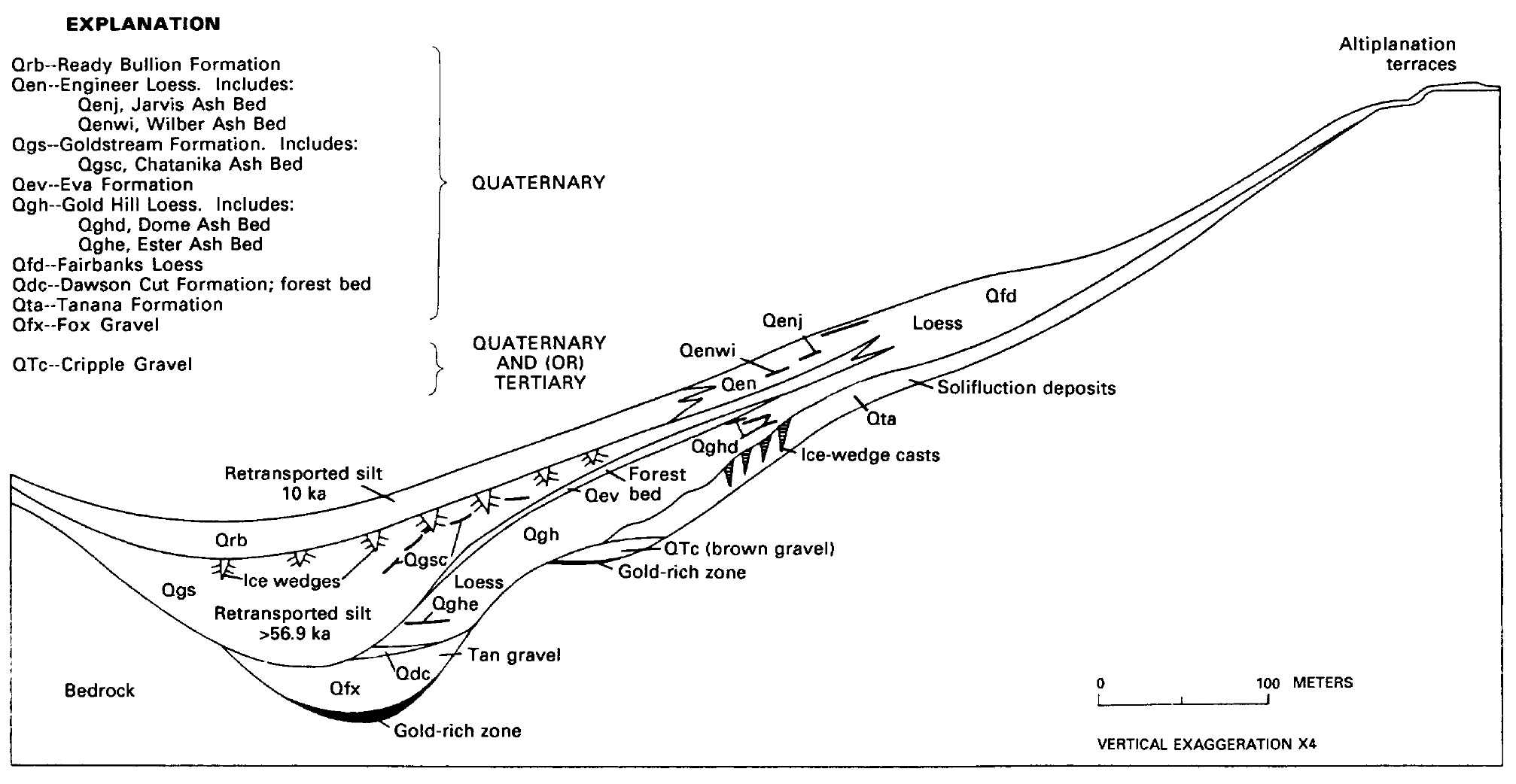
Schematic composite cross section of creek valley near Fairbanks illustrating stratigraphic relations of Goldstream Formation and associated Quaternary deposits.

In the summers of 1946, 1947, 1948, 1949, and 1951, Péwé conducted detailed field research concerning the geomorphology and Quaternary geology of the Fairbanks region while an employee of the United States Geological Survey. As a result of this research, he initially subdivided the Alaska muck (Alaska silt) into four informal stratigraphic units. These units include the (1) Dawson muck, (2) Goldstream muck, (3) Gold Hill loess, and (4) Engineer muck. After years of additional detailed field research for the United States Geological Survey, Péwé subdivided the informal Alaska muck (Alaska Silt) into formal geologic formations and formally defined them. From youngest to oldest, these geologic formations include the Ready Bullion Formation (Holocene), Engineer Loess (Holocene), informal Gibbons forest bed (Holocene), Goldstream Formation (Wisconsin), Eva Formation (forest bed)(Sangamon), Gold Hill Loess (PreSangamon to Pliocene), and Dawson Cut Formation (forest bed)(Pliocene), Tanana Formation (Pliocene), Fox Gravel (Pliocene) and Cripple Gravel (Pliocene). The Fairbanks Loess became the formal name for the upland silts. The gold-bearing gravels were formally divided into the Cripple and Fox gravels.

== Description ==
The Gold Hill Loess is the oldest and thickest loess blanketing the lower slopes and in valley bottoms of the Tanana River basin. This perennially frozen loess is exposed in the vertical cuts and highwalls of placer mines. It does not naturally outcrop on the surface. When freshly exposed, the Gold Hill Loess consists of perennially frozen, either brown or green, massive, well-sorted silt in the form of primary or retransported loess. The Gold Hill Loess directly underlying either the Eva or Goldstream formations is green because of the reduction of the ferric iron to ferrous iron. Upon exposure, the Gold Hill Loess oxidizes, thaws, and turns brown. Stratification and bedding in the Gold Hill Loess is generally indistinct or absent except where mass movement or reworking by water has created either some crude irregular or laminated bedding. Organic-rich paleosols and volcanic ash beds are common; serve as marker horizons; and define stratification in the otherwise massive loess. Immediately beneath the contact of the Gold Hill Loess with either the overlying Eva or Goldstream formations, the volcanic ash beds, paleosols, and enclosing loess are deformed by conspicuous soft sediment faulting and folding.

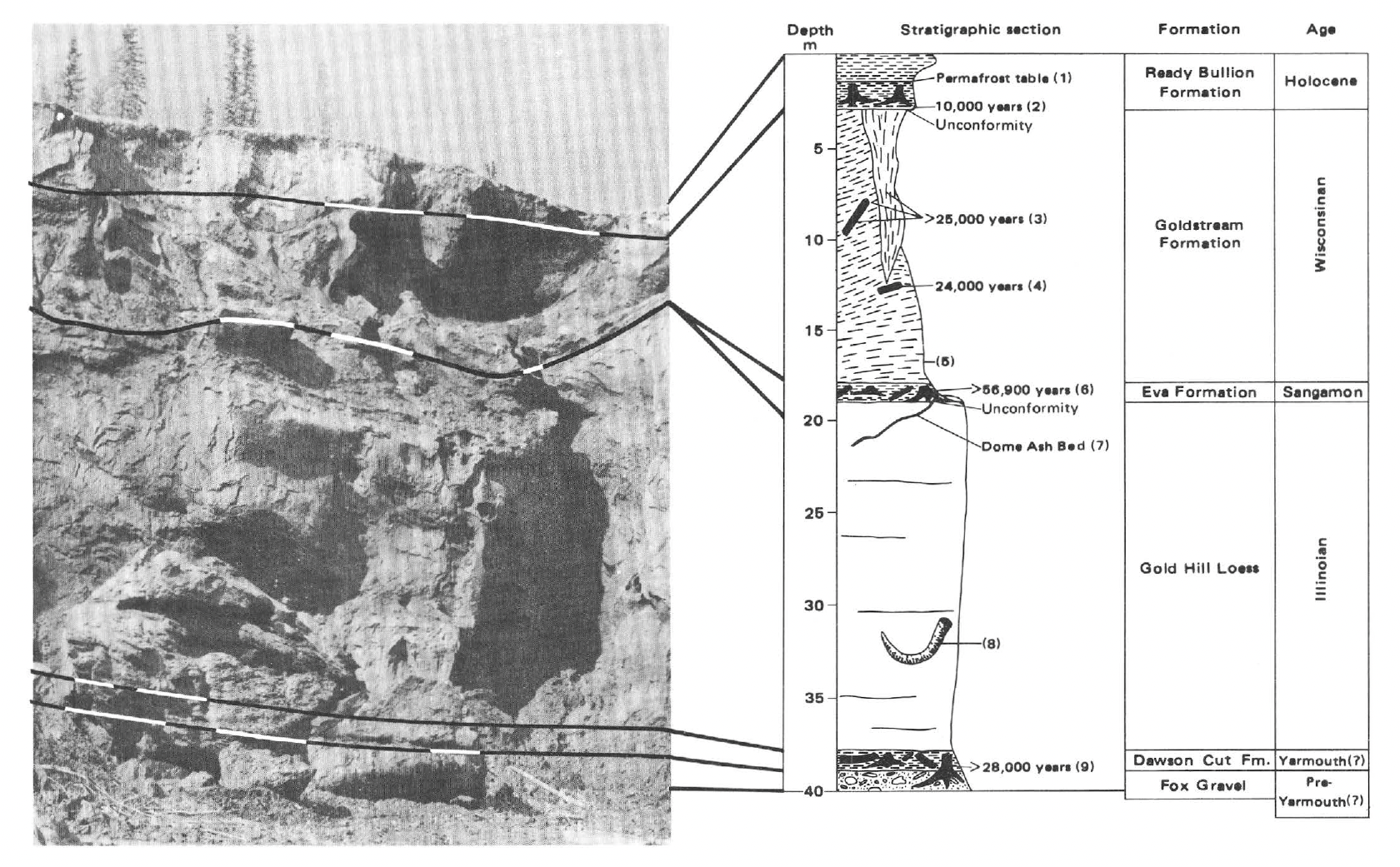
Outcrop and stratigraphy of Quaternary deposits in Eva Mining Cut, Fairbanks, Alaska, region.

Nineteen volcanic tephras occur within the Gold Hill Loess. They include the pink tephra and the Old Crow Ash Bed. The pink tephra occurs as a 1 to 2 cm (0.39 to 0.79 in) thick, pink, semi-lithified volcanic ash bed that is the oldest laterally persistent volcanic ash bed in the Gold Hill Loess. It is dated at 2.2 million years ago. In one outcrop, it lies about 15 m (49 ft) above the base of The Gold Hill Loess. The ubiquitous Old Crow Ash Bed consists of a thick to thin layer of white tephra that outcrops in the upper Gold Hill Loess. It is typically folded or faulted wherever exposed. It provides a date of about 140,000 BP for upper Gold Hill Loess.

The Gold Hill Loess also contains numerous loess kinchen. Where its loess has been washed away water spray of hydraulic jets, they form a gravelly lag composed of abundant tubular calcite concretions about 0.31 cm (0.12 in) in diameter and 2.5 cm (0.98 in) long are left behind. Locally, the Gold Hill Loess contains marcasite concretions at its base. Many of these concretions contain vertebrate bones or pebbles of shattered bedrock as nuclei.

At the Gold Hill mining cut, a 0.6 m (2.0 ft) thick gravel layer composed of rounded silt fragments, carbon fragments, small sticks and small pebbles was observed near the base of the Gold Hill Loess. This layer is slightly more resistant than the rest of the loess and it formed a ledge when it had been exposed in the wall of the placer excavation. Also, at this location, very thin gravel seams about 5 to 15 cm (2.0 to 5.9 in) thick and composed of angular pebbles about 1.3 to 2.5 cm (0.51 to 0.98 in) in diameter were once exposed. Several, similar gravel layers were observed in exposures along the right descending bank of upper Engineer Creek.

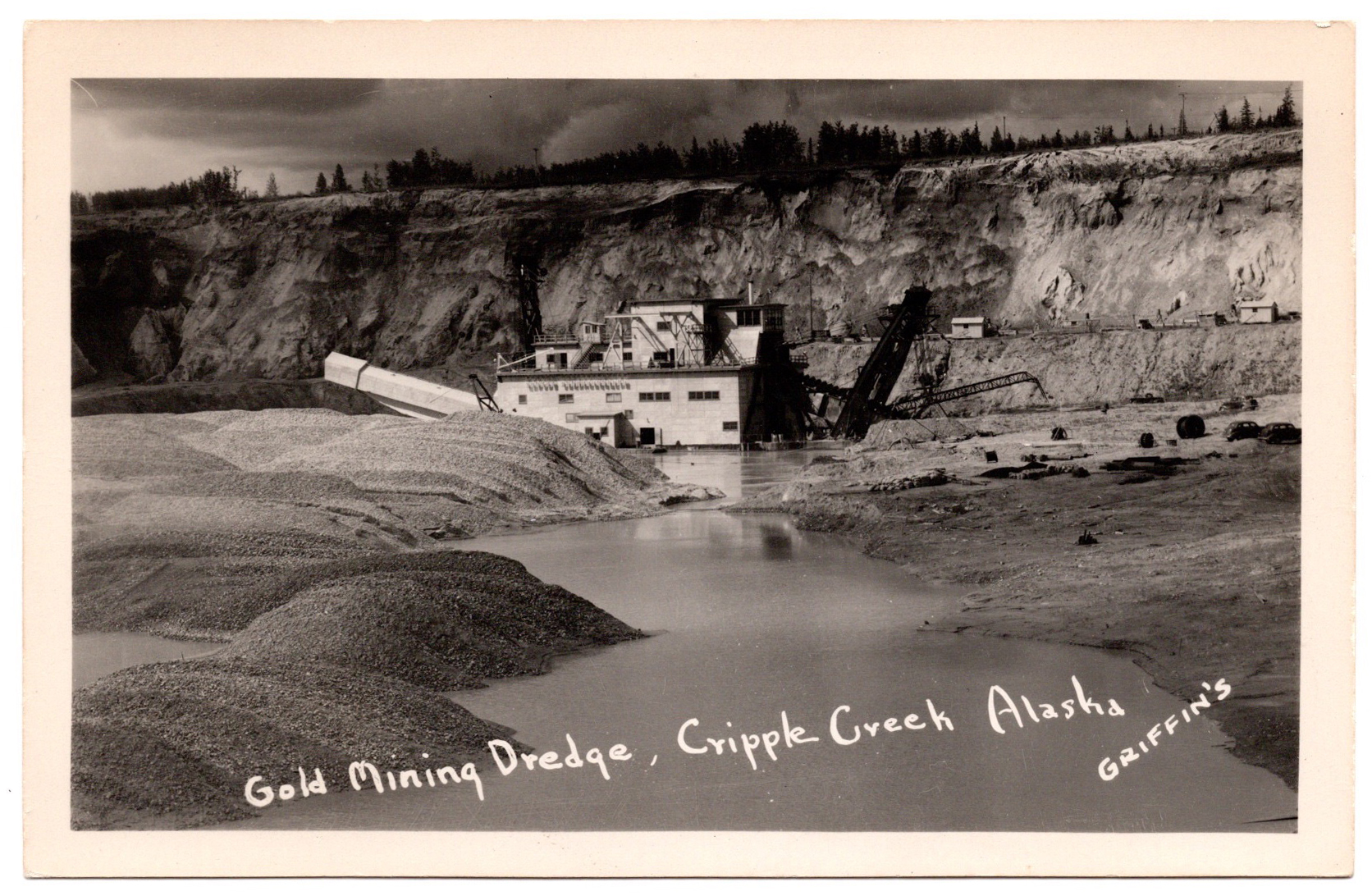
Gold mining dredge at Cripple Creek, Alaska mining cut circa 1942. On far right, intact and unslumped section exposed in highwall of cut. uppermost, light-colored layer is part of Ready Bullion Formation underlain by dark-colored layer of its Giddings Forest Bed. Light-colored Goldstream Formation resting on thin, dark-colored, and less well exposed layer of Eva Formation (Eva Forest Bed). Between the Eva Forest Bed and bench, on which sheds rest, consists of Gold Hill Loess. Dawson Cut forest Bed at base is concealed beneath accumulated slump sediments. Bench at base of mining cut consists of gold-bearing Pliocene fluvial gravels. As is typical, mining cut that is directly behind and left of gold dredged is badly slumped and jumbled.

== Contacts and Unconformities ==
The most complete known thickness of the Gold Hill Loess exists at it type section in the Gold Hill Mining cut about 10 km (6.2 mi) west of Fairbanks, Alaska. Based on paleomagnetic data, radiometric dating of tephra and silt, and sedimentary structures it has been determined that this exposure of the Gold Hill Loess records for the past 3 million years major periods of loess deposition in glacial tundra or steppes and associated permafrost alternating with major periods of erosion of the loess blanket, permafrost degradation, and thermokarst formation associated with interglacial boreal forests. The result of the alternation of these processes, is numerous layers of loess or retransported loess separated by laterally persistent unconformities. Of the numerous unconformities, two form the upper and lower contacts of the Gold Hill Loess. Two other prominent unconformities subdivide the Gold Hill Loess into three members, upper, middle, and lower Gold Hill Loess. These unconformities also record periods of severe erosion of the accumulated loess, interglacial climates, and regional boreal forests.

The lowermost unconformity within the Gold Hill Loess, which separates its middle and lower subdivisions, directly underlies a distinctive layer of frozen dark gray to black, organic-rich, well-sorted, silt. This bed of silt, which is known as the Dawson Cut forest bed, contains rooted tree stumps of spruce, horizontal spruce logs, and layers of peat. The weight of compression of the overlying deposits has smashed, flattened, and splintered the logs and stumps. The stumps are rooted in peaty soil. Where the reversally magnetized, lower Pleistocene loess of the lower subdivision has been removed by extensive erosion prior to the accumulation of Pleistocene middle subdivision, Dawson cut forest bed lies directly on and forms the contact with underlying Pliocene gold-bearing gravels.

== Fossils ==
The placer mines of the Fairbank, Alaska, region are internationally famous for the vertebrate remains recovered during placer mining operations. While active, the removal of silty overburden, known informally as either Alaska muck, Alaska Silt, or simply muck, to expose gold-bearing gravels resulted in the collection of hundreds of thousands of individual vertebrate fossils. The overwhelming majority of these vertebrate fossils were collected only after they have been "washed out" of the thick silty sediments overlying the gold-bearing garvels by hydraulic placer mining. As a result, these fossils were collected with, little if any, attention paid to their stratigraphic position and age within the muck.

There are two primary reasons for the lack of precise stratigraphic and chronostratigraphic provenance for vast majority for fossil bones collected from the muck during placer mining. First, the collection of vertebrate fossils in place was impractical given the continuous nature of hydraulic mining used in placer mining. Mining could not be stopped for the several days that normal paleontological practices would need to properly excavate fossil bones from the perennially frozen silts. Because of the constant, 24 hours a day, tempo of hydraulic placer mining, specimens were simply collected as they were washed from the silty overburden by miners and piled up in a single pile regardless of source to be later collected by paleontologists. Finally, prior to the early 1950s when the majority of the fossil vertebrates where collected, the Alaskan muck (muck) was incorrectly treated as a uniform, jumbled mass of silty sediment, plant remains, and fossil bones lacking any definable internal stratigraphy. Since the current geologic formations were not yet recognized, defined, and mapped and dating techniques capable of dating these deposits did not exist, collecting data about either the age or the exact provenance of even in situ fossils was not the standard practiced. Regardless, interpretations of limited observations indicate that the vast majority of these fossil bones collected in the Fairbanks region came from the Goldstream Formation instead of the Gold Hill Loess.

Pewe reported an in situ, isolated and worn mammoth tusk fragment about 33 cm (1.08 ft) long and a single worn bison vertebrae in the Gold Hill Loess of the Eva Creek mining cut. In the Gold Hill Loess exposed in the Fairbanks Creek mining cut, a worn bone fragment of a bison was found in place and near the mouth of this creek, mining operations revealed several in place articulated caribou ribs. Finally, in the Cripple Sump cut, south of Ester "Island" in Sec. 8, T.1S., R.2W., a concentration of worn and unarticulated fossil bones were found in a patch of Gold Hill Loess filling a depression in the underlying gold-bearing gravels. Other, fossil bones from apparently the same concentration were observed lying on the exposed gravel surface. These fossils included the bones of mammoth, mastodon, bison, horse, musk ox, moose, elk, giant elk, caribou, mountain sheep, Bootherium, Praeovibos, bear, lion, wolf, fox, and Rocky Mountain goat were identified from this location. Most of these fossil bones are worn. Even resistant horse teeth are considerably abraded by water transport. These and other observations suggest that the large mammal bones are common, but not abundant, in the Gold Hill Loess. Typically, they are disarticulated, water worn, weathered, and have a partial coating of vivianite. At one exposure, a thin bonebed forms part of the uncomformity separating the upper and middle subdivions of the Gold Hill Loess. preservation of hair, hide, or tissue of any kind, as has been found in the Goldstream Formation, is lacking in the Gold Hill Loess.

The fossil bones of small arctic and alpine mammals occur throughout the Gold Hill Loess. Guthrie recovered Microtus gregalis, Lemmus sibericus, Dicrostonyx torquatus, and Citellus undulatus from the Gold Hill Loess.

In sharp contrast to the overlying Eva and Goldstream Formations, plant remains are scarce in the Gold Hill Loess. The main plant remain that have been found in these sediments are a few plant stems or moss fibers and the occasional fragment of birch bark. In addition, carbon fragments and small sticks occur in the thin conglomerate beds. In the upper Engineer Creek mining cut and near the base of the Gold Hill Loess, several 10 cm (3.9 in) thick, contorted peat beds that contained burnt vegetation were once exposed. These peat beds, however, might actually be part of the underlying Dawson Cut forest bed. Finally, samples of volcanic ash from the Gold Hill Loess were found to contain diatoms.

== See also ==
- List of fossiliferous stratigraphic units in Alaska
- Yedoma
