= Ready Bullion Formation =

Fossiliferous Holocene geologic unit found in Central Alaska

- Stratigraphic range: Holocene; 0.001–0.01 Ma
- Type: Geological formation
- Unit of: Alaska muck , Alaska silt (informal)
- Sub-units: Giddings Forest Bed
- Underlies: ground surface
- Overlies: Goldstream Formation
- Thickness: 1 to 5 m (3.3 to 16.4 ft)

Lithology
- Primary: perennially frozen silt
- Other: volcanic ash, forest bed

Location
- Coordinates: 64°50′37″N 147°43′23″W
- Region: central Alaska, US, and Yukon Territory Canada.
- Country: United States of America
- Extent: Yukon and Tanana river drainage basins, Alaska.

Type section
- Named for: Ready Bullion Creek
- Named by: Troy L. Péwé

The Ready Bullion Formation is a geologic formation that consists of a 1–5 m (3.3–16.4 ft) thick layer of perennially frozen, medium- to dark-brown, organic-rich, silt. A well preserved forest bed, named the Giddings Forest Bed, occurs at its base. The silt is loess that has been retransported downslope and redeposited by solifluction and other slope processes. The Ready Bullion Formation unconformably overlies the Goldstream Formation and forms the undisturbed surface of historic uplands and valley slopes. Upslope, it laterally grades into the Engineer Loess. The Ready Bullion Formation is the uppermost geologic formation of a 15–61 m (49–200 ft) thick layer of Late Pliocene to Holocene sediments that blanket the valley walls of the rivers of central Alaska. Vertebrate fossils are scarce within it and consist of only nonextinct taxa. Numerous radiocarbon dates indicate that deposition of the Ready Bullion Formation occurred between 10,500 years ago and present.

The Ready Bullion Formation is named for its type location, which is the highwall of a mining cut on Ready Bullion Creek, Alaska. The type section lies within the SW1/4 sec.6, T1S R2W, about 17 km (11 mi) west of Fairbanks, Alaska. this formation is also well exposed in vertical banks on Ready Bullion, Eva, Engineer, Sheep, Fairbanks, and Dome Creeks. It also outcrops in the bluffs and banks in the Fairbanks area; on Wilber, Amy, Lillian, and other creeks in the Livengood area and in placer mining cuts in the Tofty, Circle, and Chicken areas. It also outcrops in placer mines near Dawson, Yukon Territory.

== Nomenclature ==
In the late 1800s and early 1900s, geologists recognized that a thick, 15–61 m (49–200 ft) or more, blanket of, often organic-rich, silty sediment is widely distributed along the Yukon River and its tributaries. They also overlie bedrock and Pliocene gold-bearing fluvial gravels. These massive to weakly bedded silt deposits form conspicuously high bluffs along the banks of streams and rivers. These silty sediments were regarded to be Pliocene and mostly Pleistocene on the basis of its vertebrate fossils and stratigraphy. In 1898, Spurr applied the name, Yukon Silt, to this same blanket of silty, often either clayey or organic-rich, sediment. In 1892, Dall and Harris proposed the name Kowak Clays for similar fine-grained, Pleistocene, sediments. Along with the Yukon Silt, this term designated the entire thickness of silty sediments blanketing either side of the Yukon River.

In the 1940s, various studies were conducted about the archaeology, geocryology, paleontology, and stratigraphy of these silty sediments. In these studies, the terms, Yukon Silt and Kowak Clays, had disappeared from the published literature. Instead, some of these researchers refer informally to these sediments simply as either muck or Alaska muck. This term muck was at a that time and is still used by local miners and geologists to refer to typically dark gray to black silt, which contains a considerable quantity of plant remains, lenses of ice, permafrost, and thin beds of peat and volcanic ash that directly overlie gold-bearing fluvial gravels. Instead of muck still other researchers use the informal term Alaska silts for the same sequence of sediments.

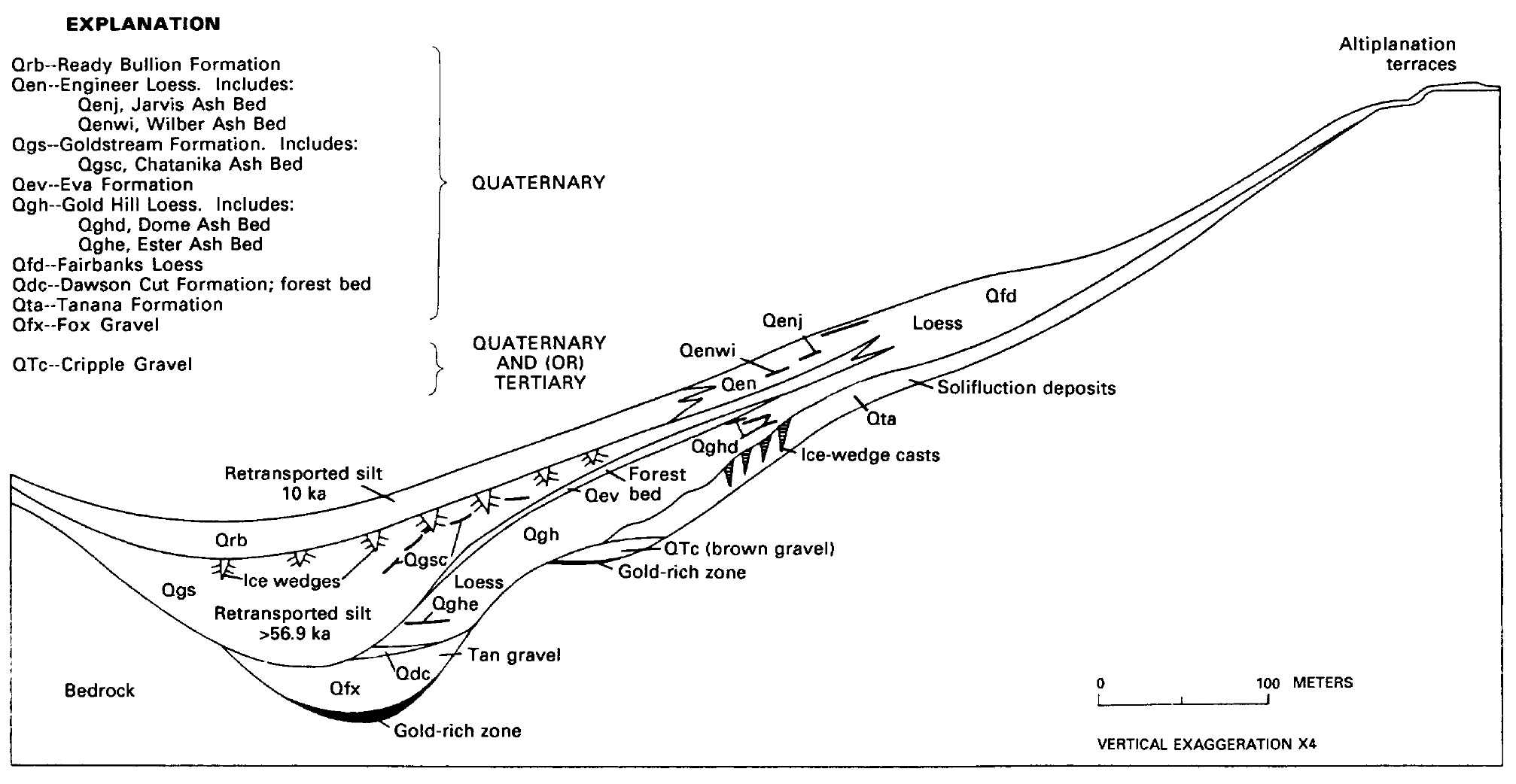
Schematic composite cross section of creek valley near Fairbanks illustrating stratigraphic relations of Goldstream Formation and associated Quaternary deposits.

In the summers of 1946, 1947, 1948, 1949, and 1951, Péwé conducted detailed field research concerning the geomorphology and Quaternary Geology of the Fairbanks, Alaska, region within the Tanana River valley and Yukon-Tanana Upland. This research was conducted for the Alaska Terrain and Permafrost Section of the United States Geological Survey in Alaska and a PhD dissertation accepted in 1953. As a part of this study, he subdivided the Alaska muck (Alaska silt) into five informal stratigraphic units. These units are the (1) auriferous gravel, (2) Dawson muck, (3) Fairbanks loess, (4) Goldstream muck, (5) Gold Hill loess, and (5) Engineer muck. As the result of years of additional detailed field research for the United States Geological Survey, Péwé formally subdivided the obsolete Alaska muck and Alaska silt terminology into formal geologic formation and defined them according to the rules of stratigraphic nomenclature. These geologic formations include the Ready Bullion Formation (Holocene), Engineer Loess (Holocene), Giddings Forest Bed (Holocene), Goldstream Formation (Wisconsin), Eva Formation (forest bed)(Sangamon), Gold Hill Loess (PreSangamon to Pliocene), Dawson Cut Formation (forest bed)(Pliocene), Tanana Formation (Pliocene), Fox Gravel (Pliocene) and Cripple Gravel (Pliocene).

== Description ==
The Ready Bullion Formation consists of perennially frozen organic-rich silt that contains an abundance of minute carbonized plant fragments, peat lenses, sticks, and logs and rooted stumps. When frozen, it is gray to black and medium- to dark-brown when thawed and oxidized. Locally, especially near junctions with tributary stream and creek, these silts contain beds and lenses of sandy angular gravel that are less than 1 m (3.3 ft) thick. Ready Bullion Formation is poorly to well stratified and perennially frozen below a depth of 1 m (3.3 ft). Unlike the underlying Goldstream Formation, it lacks large foliated ice masses. These silty sediments contain only ice seams and lenses less than 1 cm (0.39 in) thick and sometimes rare clear-ice masses of recent origin. The Ready Bullion Formation unconformably overlies the Goldstream Formation. This formation is a thin, but widespread, blanket of organic-rich retransported and redeposited loess underlying the creek valley bottoms and lower slopes in central Alaska and the Yukon Territory. It is the parent sediment in which the modern soil is developed.

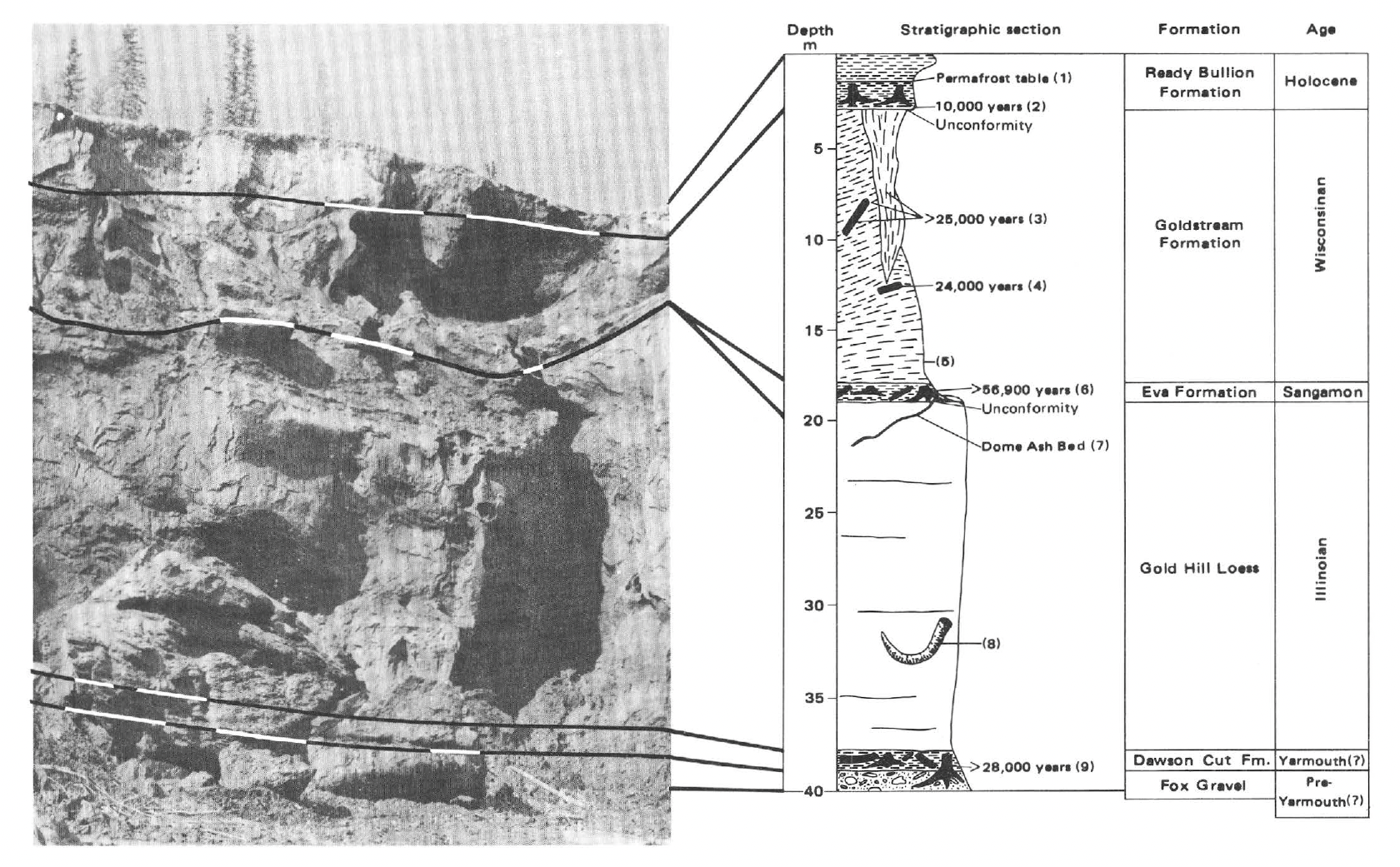
Outcrop and stratigraphy of Quaternary deposits in Eva Mining Cut, Fairbanks, Alaska, region.

Giddings Forest Bed is the youngest, Holocene, of three laterally persistent Pleistocene forest beds recognized within the Pleistocene deposits underlying the valley walls of the rivers and streams within the Yukon and Tanana river drainages and upland. This forest bed is a regional marker horizon that lies at the base of the Ready Bullion Formation and Engineer Loess.. Unlike the older Eva Forest Bed (Sangamonian Stage) and Dawson Cut Forest Bed (Pre-Sangamonian interglacial). The organic-rich silts of the Giddings Forest Bed contains excellently preserved, frozen leaves, sticks, and logs and rooted stumps. Unlike other forest beds, many of the leaves found in the Giddings Forest Bed are still green and wood is only discolored. The wood of the Eva Forest Bed, which comprises the Eva Formation, is moderately to excellently preserved; not compressed, smashed, or flattened; and wood cell structure is good. In sharp contrast to the Giddings and Eva forest beds, the wood of the Dawson Cut Forest Bed is significantly weathered, smashed, flattened, and iron-stained. Also, the cell structure of its wood is not well preserved. Birch and spruce dominate the Giddings and Eva forest beds. They are rarely found in the Dawson Cut Forest Bed. The Giddings Forest Bed is named for the late J. Louis Giddings, who first recognized these forest beds in 1938. He was a pioneering archaeologist and dendrochronologist in Pleistocene paleoenvironmental studies in Alaska. The type locality of the Giddings Forest Bed is an exposure of ready Bullion Formation located at the mouth of Engineering Creek.

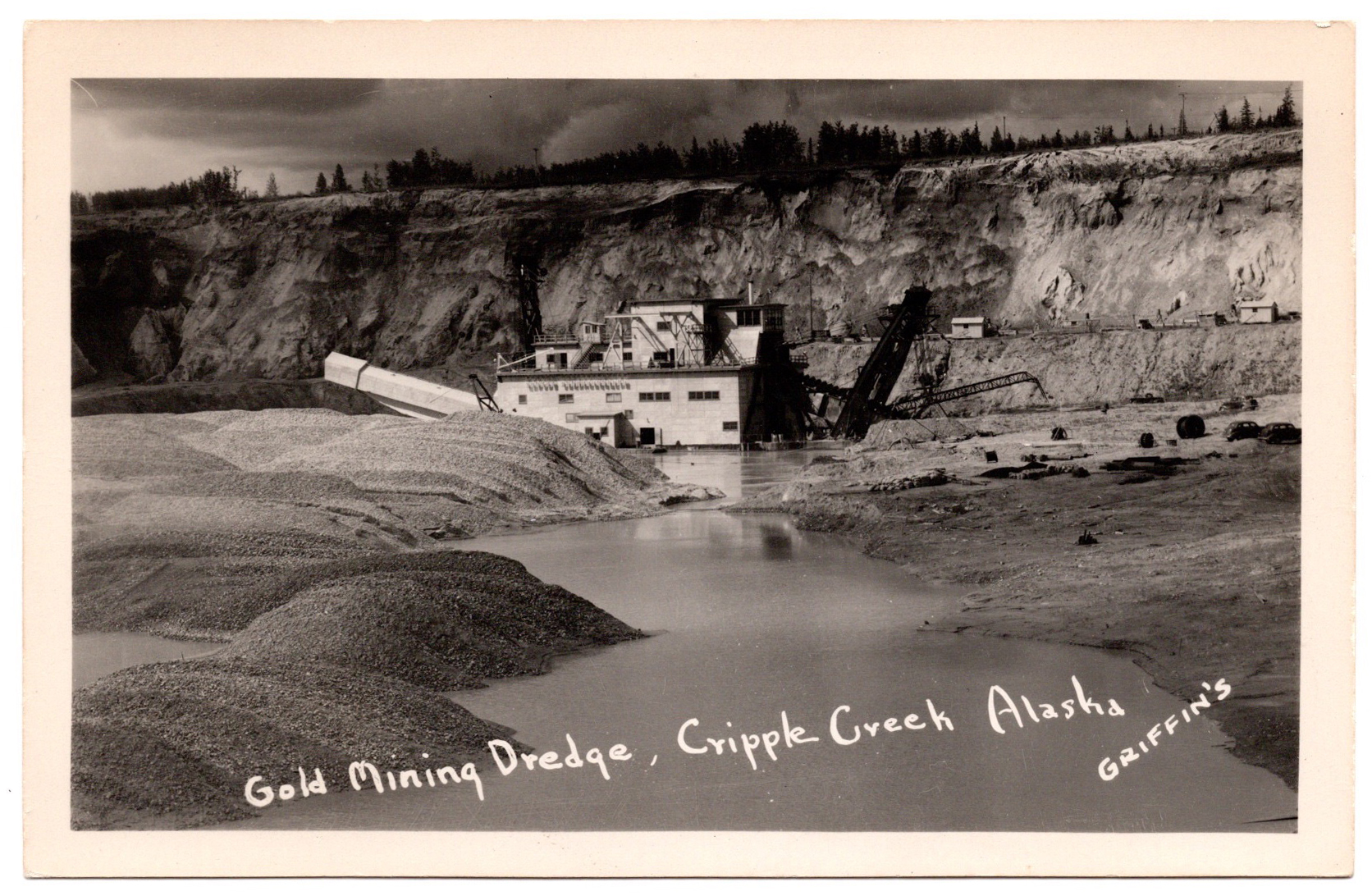
Gold mining dredge at Cripple Creek, Alaska mining cut circa 1942. On far right, intact and unslumped section exposed in highwall of cut. uppermost, light-colored layer is part of Ready Bullion Formation underlain by dark-colored layer of its Giddings Forest Bed. Light-colored Goldstream Formation resting on thin, dark-colored, and less well exposed layer of Eva Formation (Eva Forest Bed). Between the Eva Forest Bed and bench, on which sheds rest, consists of Gold Hill Loess. Dawson Cut forest Bed at base is concealed beneath accumulated slump sediments. Bench at base of mining cut consists of gold-bearing Pliocene fluvial gravels. As is typical, mining cut that is directly befined and left of gold dredged is badly slumped and jumbled.

== Fossils ==
Unlike the underlying Goldstream Formation, vertebrate remains in the Ready Bullion Formation are scarce, scattered, and disarticulated. The vertebrate remains, which have been recovered from it, consist only of nonextinct taxa. None of the many extinct Pleistocene forms such as bison, horse, and mammoth present in the underlying Goldstream Formation have been found in it.

Plant remains, including fresh-looking green leaves, found in the Ready Bullion Formation are abundant and exceedingly well preserved. This formation also contains lenses and pods of peat and Giddings Forest Bed, which contains well-preserved logs, twigs and rooted stumps of birch and spruce. At one exposure, Giddings described the occurrence of three spruce forest layers with stumps superposed on one another within the Ready Bullion Formation. In this formation, tree remains are much more common than in the underlying Goldstream Formation.

== Age ==
The age of the Ready Bullion Formation in the Fairbanks area is well established by numerous radiocarbon dates made on wood samples from this formation and the contemporaneous Engineer Loess. These radiocarbon dates range from about 3,000 to 10,000 years ago with a majority of them in the range of 5,000-7,000 years ago. For example, a sample of wood (L117H) collected about 2 m (6.6 ft) below the surface from the Ready Bullion Formation on Eva Creek yielded a radiocarbon date of 3,7500±200 years ago. In addition, a sample of wood (G137S) collected from the base of Engineer Loess at the Eva Creek mining cut yielded a radiocarbon date of 10,500±500 years ago. The radiocarbon dates compiled by Péwé and others demonstrate that deposition of Ready Bullion Formation began shortly after the end of the Pleistocene and it is entirely Holocene in age.

== See also ==
- List of fossiliferous stratigraphic units in Alaska
- Yedoma
