= Goldstream Formation =

Wisconsin glacial geologic formation found in Central Alaska

- Stratigraphic range: Wisconsin Stage; 0.013–0.090 Ma
- Type: Geological formation
- Unit of: Alaska muck or Alaska silt (informal)
- Sub-units: Chatanika Ash Bed
- Underlies: Ready Bullion Formation and Engineer Loess
- Overlies: Eva Formation, Gold Hill Loess, Tanana Formation, or Dawson Cut Formation
- Thickness: 10 to 35 m (33 to 115 ft)

Lithology
- Primary: perennially frozen silt
- Other: volcanic ash, peat

Location
- Coordinates: 64°50′37″N 147°43′23″W
- Region: Alaska, US
- Country: United States of America
- Extent: Yukon and Tanana river drainage basins, Alaska.

Type section
- Named for: Goldstream Creek
- Named by: Troy L. Péwé

The Goldstream Formation is a geologic formation in Alaska that consists of a 10–35 m (33–115 ft) thick layer of perennially frozen, black to greenish-black, poorly bedded silt. It contains a thin, white, vitric, volcanic ash layer, called the Chatanika Ash Bed. The silt is loess that has been retransported and redeposited by solifluction and other slope process. It conformably overlies the Eva Formation and unconformably overlies the Gold Hill Loess, Tanana Formation, Dawson Cut Formation, Fox Gravel, and Cripple Gravel. It conformably underlies either the Ready Bullion Formation or Engineer Loess. Together all of these geologic formations forms a 15–61 m (49–200 ft) thick layer of Late Pliocene to Holocene silty, often organic-rich, sediments that fill the river valleys of central Alaska. The Goldstream Formation is the lateral, downslope equivalent the upper part of the Fairbanks Loess. Goldstream Formation is internationally known for the Pleistocene vertebrate remains, both skeletal and soft tissue, that it contains.

== Nomenclature ==
In the late 1800s and early 1900s, geologists found that a thick, 15–61 m (49–200 ft) or more, blanket of silty, typically either clayey or organic-rich, sediment is widely distributed along the Yukon River and its tributaries. These silty deposits overlie bedrock and gold-bearing fluvial gravels. Within the limits of known glaciation, these fine-grained sediments cover glacial tills. These typically massive to weakly bedded silt deposits outcrop as conspicuously high bluffs along the cut banks of streams and rivers and high walls of gold mining pits. These silty sediments were judged to possibly be as old as Pliocene and mostly Pleistocene by the presence of numerous vertebrate and invertebrate fossils and being unconformable with underlying, older strata, except some of the gravels.

In 1898, Spurr formally applied the name, Yukon Silt, to the entire thickness of this blanket of silty, often either clayey or organic-rich, sediment. In 1892, Dall and Harris proposed the name Kowak Clays for similar fine-grained, Pleistocene, sediments, which contained quantities of mammoth tusks. This name is derived from exposures in a bluff, about 1.2 km (0.75 mi) long and 45 m (148 ft) high, on the Kowak River about longitude 158 west. These fine-grained sediments were noted as being associated with mammoth remains at Skull Cliff and many other locations between Barrow, Alaska, and the mouth of the Colville River. In addition to Yukon Silt, this term was used to designate to the entire thickness of silty sediments blanketing either side of the Yukon River.

By the 1940s, a series of studies were conducted concerning archaeology, geocryology, paleontology, and stratigraphy of this blanket of silty sediments in the 1940s. By this time, the terms Yukon Silt and Kowak Clays in reference to it had both disappeared from the published literature. The last use of these terms appears to have been by Frick in 1937. Instead, these researchers refer informally to these sediments simply as either muck or Alaska muck. Muck is a term used by miners and geologists regionally refer to predominately dark gray to black silt, which contains a considerable quantity of plant remains, lenses of ice, permafrost, and thin beds of peat and volcanic ash that directly overlie gold-bearing fluvial gravels. Instead of muck, still other researchers used the informal term Alaska silts for the same silty sediments. In these studies, the terms muck, Alaska muck, and Alaska silts haphazardly lump together and conflate several distinct geologic formations ranging in age from three million to only a few thousand years as one geologic formation.

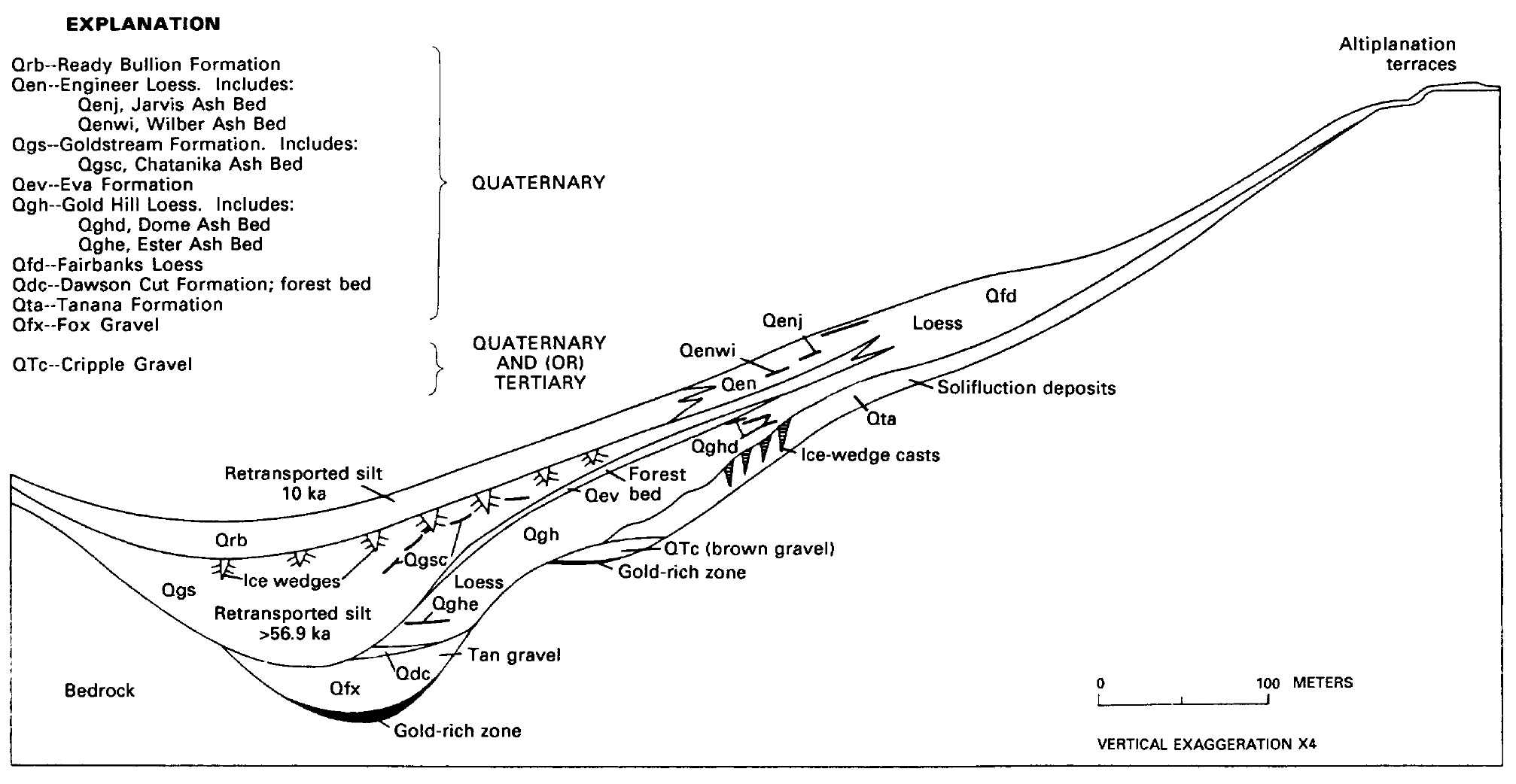
Schematic composite cross section of creek valley near Fairbanks illustrating stratigraphic relations of Goldstream Formation and associated Quaternary deposits.

In the summers of 1946, 1947, 1948, 1949, and 1951, Péwé conducted detailed field research concerning the geomorphology and Quaternary Geology of the Fairbanks, Alaska, region within the Tanana River valley and Yukon-Tanana upland. This research was conducted for the Alaska Terrain and Permafrost Section of the United States Geological Survey in Alaska and a PhD dissertation accepted in 1952. As a part of this study, he subdivided the Alaska muck (Alaska silt) into four informal stratigraphic units. These units are the (1) Dawson muck, (2) Goldstream muck, (3) Gold Hill loess, and (4) Engineer muck. As the result of years of additional detailed field research for the United States Geological Survey, Péwé formally abandoned and subdivided the obsolete Alaska muck (Alaska silt) into formal geologic formations and defined them according to the rules of stratigraphic nomenclature. These geologic formations include the Ready Bullion Formation (Holocene), Engineer Loess (Holocene), informal Gibbons forest bed (Holocene), Goldstream Formation (Wisconsin), Eva Formation (forest bed)(Sangamon), Gold Hill Loess (PreSangamon to Pliocene), and Dawson Cut Formation (forest bed)(Pliocene), Tanana Formation (Pliocene), Fox Gravel (Pliocene) and Cripple Gravel (Pliocene).

== Description ==
The Goldstream Formation consists of perennially frozen, predominately black to greenish black, silt that contains an abundance of fine and disseminated organic matter, a few peat lenses, some sticks and twigs. In outcrop, it defrosts, dries out, and turns a light gray to tan. The silt is poorly to well bedded as emphasized by ice seams and lenses. Mostly in the upper part of the formation, large, foliated ice wedges are abundant. Locally, local, large masses of pingo ice occur. Within the upper middle of the Goldstream Formation, a thin, white layer of glassy volcanic ash, the Chatanika Ash Bed - dated at 14,000 BP, can be found. Rarely, near the base of the formation on lower hill slopes and junctions of tributary creeks, either thin layers of sand, meter-thick, angular alluvial gravel, or both also occurs.

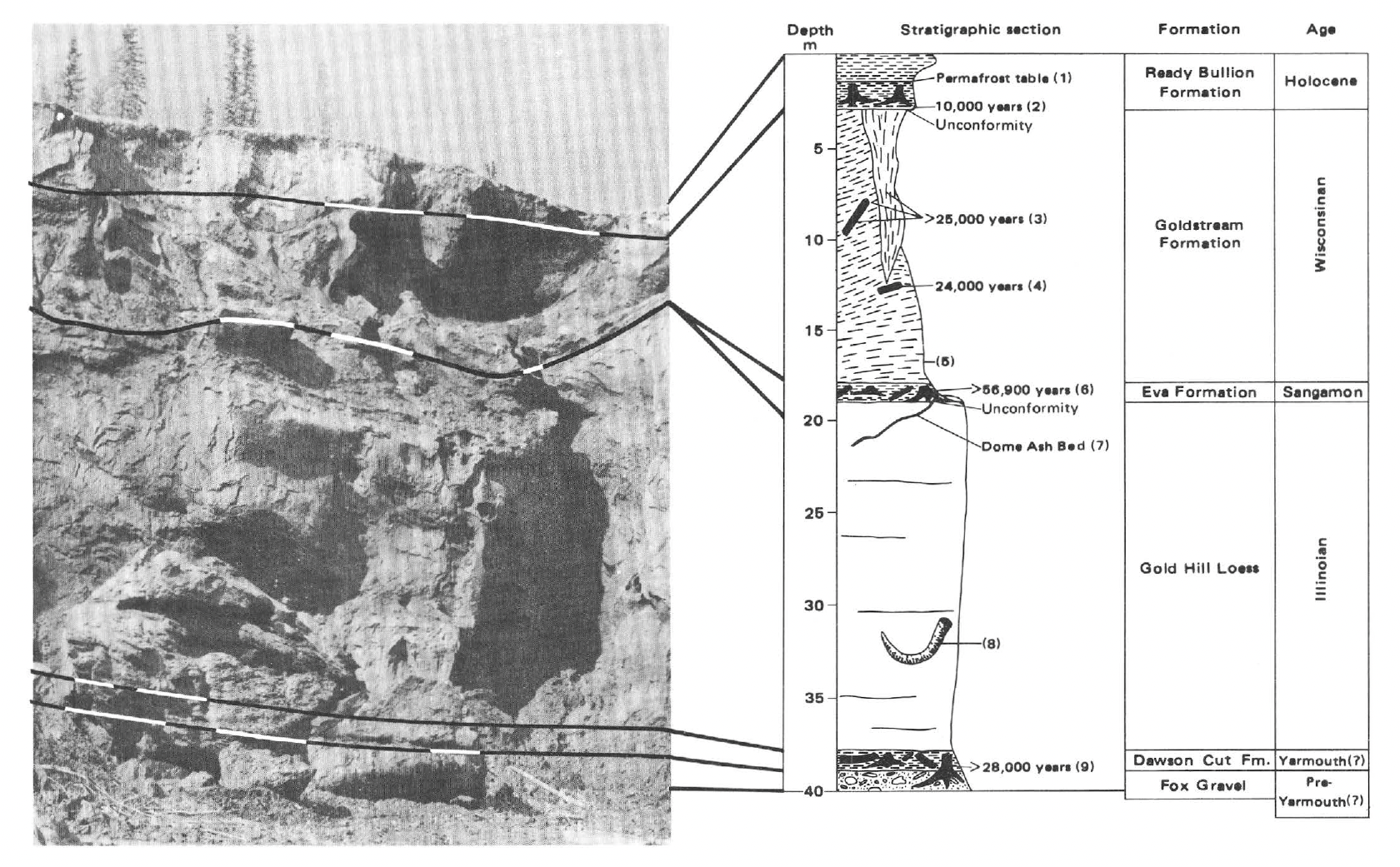
Outcrop and stratigraphy of Quaternary deposits in Eva Mining Cut, Fairbanks, Alaska, region.

Locally, the Goldstream Formation contains numerous peat layers ranging thickness from about a centimeter to 1.5 m (4.9 ft) thick. One 1.5 m (4.9 ft) thick peat bed observed at the contact of Goldstream Formation with underlying Gold Hill Loess consists of an undulatory layer about 15 m (49 ft) long. The peat is well compacted and typically, but not always, has little mineral content. In many places, peat contains in situ tree stumps. Often, isolated pods or lumps of peat occur enclosed by black silt.

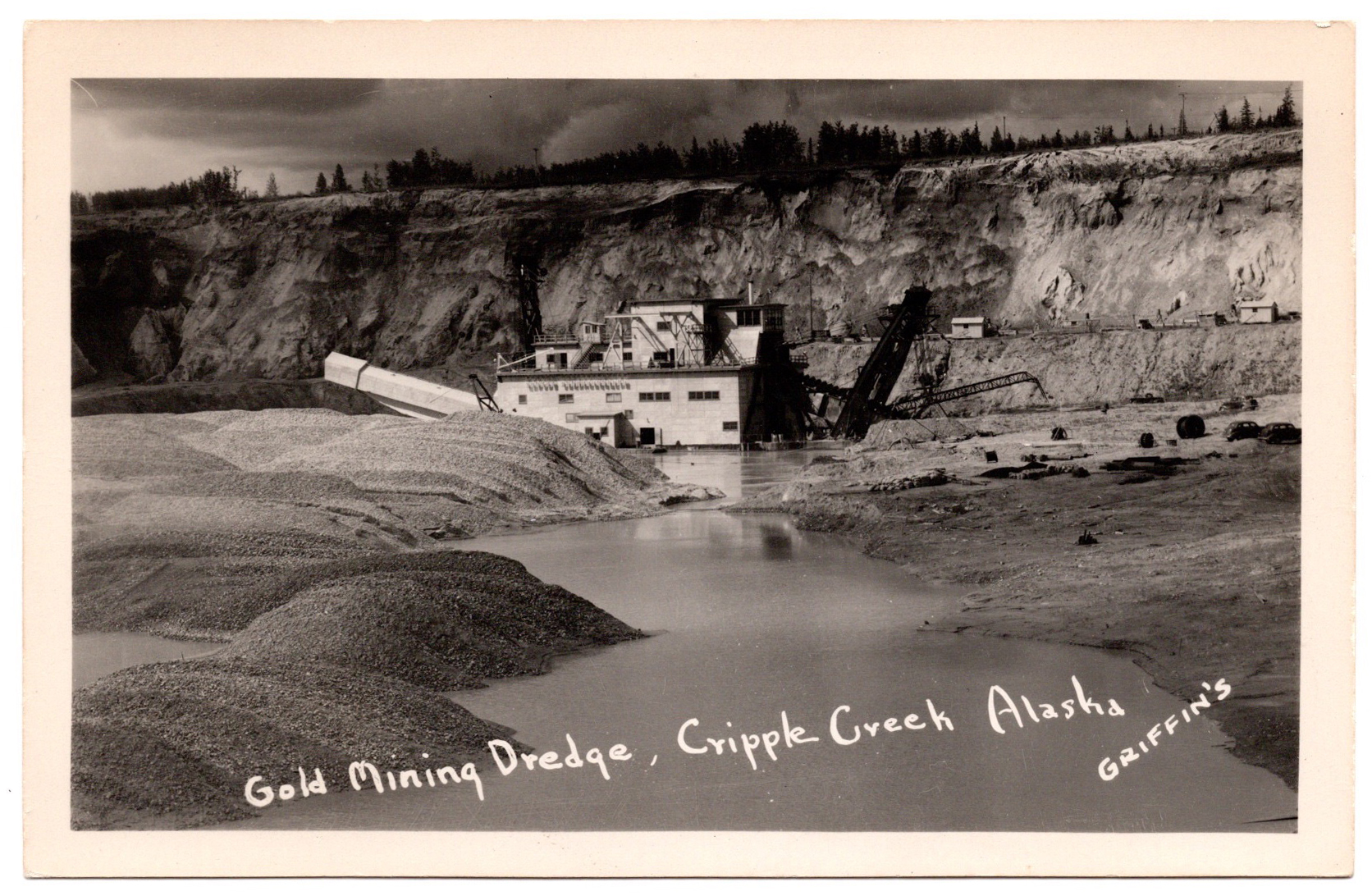
Gold mining dredge at Cripple Creek, Alaska mining cut circa 1942. On far right, intact and unslumped section exposed in highwall of cut. uppermost, light-colored layer is part of Ready Bullion Formation underlain by dark-colored layer of its Giddings Forest Bed. Light-colored Goldstream Formation resting on thin, dark-colored, and less well exposed layer of Eva Formation (Eva Forest Bed). Between the Eva Forest Bed and bench, on which sheds rest, consists of Gold Hill Loess. Dawson Cut forest Bed at base is concealed beneath accumulated slump sediments. Bench at base of mining cut consists of gold-bearing Pliocene fluvial gravels. As is typical, mining cut that is directly befined and left of gold dredged is badly slumped and jumbled.

Goldstream Formation is the most widespread of the silty deposits that once were haphazardly mapped together in the past as either the now abandoned Alaska muck, Alaska silt, or muck of Alaska, region. The Goldstream Formation varies in thickness from 10–23 m (33–75 ft) in creek and stream bottoms where it lies uncomfortably on either fluvial, gold-bearing gravels of the Cripple and Fox formations or the forest bed of the Dawson Cut Formation. Its greatest thickness, up to 35 m (115 ft), is within the middle valley slopes where it uncomfortably overlies the Eva Formation. Where the Eva formation has been removed by erosion, the Goldstream Formation uncomfortably overlies the Gold Hill Loess. Further upslope, it thins to 1.5–5 m (4.9–16.4 ft)and laterally merges with Fairbank Loess that blankets the surrounding uplands. The Goldstream Formation is overlain conformably by either the Engineer Loess or Ready Bullion Formation.

== Fossils ==
The Goldstream Formation is well known in Alaska and North America for the abundant fossil bones of Pleistocene vertebrates it has yielded. However, very few of these fossils were found in situ. Instead, most of these bones were seen or collected after washed free of their enclosing sediments by large-scale gold mining operations. As a result, very little is definitely known about the stratigraphic context of these fossils. Still, interpretations of available and limited observations conclude that the vast majority of the fossil bones collected in the Fairbanks region have come from the Goldstream Formation. This lack of data has largely limited research to the identification and classification of these fossil bones. The bones of bison are the most abundant vertebrate remains with mammoth and horse are next in abundance. The diverse vertebrate fauna of the Goldstream Formation has been discussed by Anthony, Frick, Guthrie, Mertie, Péwé, Repenning, Skinner, Taber, and others.

The other interesting and geologically important vertebrate fossils found in the Goldstream Formation are bones of mammals that have dried flesh, skin, or hair still clinging to them. Such partial soft tissue remains of mammoth, bison, musk ox, Bootherium, moose, horse, lynx, caribou, and ground squirrel have been found in the Fairbanks region. In addition, complete carcasses of ground squirrels have been found in nests found in situ in the Goldstream Formation. The most celebrated finds of soft tissue vertebrate remains are the partial forequarters of a baby mammoth, known as either Effie or Fairbanks Creek Mammoth and a relatively complete, partially scavenged carcass of a steppe bison known as Blue Babe. The carcass of Effie shows evidence of having been transported only a very short distance before burial. The carcass of Blue Babe shows a complete lack of any transport in addition to having been scavenged prior to burial. A radiocarbon date of greater than 28,000 BP was obtained on a tissue sample from Effie in 1951. Later, in 1965, a radiocarbon date of 31,400±2,040 was obtained on another tissue sample from Effie. A radiocarbon date of 36,425+2575/ -1974 BP was obtained on a tissue sample from Blue Babe. The preservation of the soft tissue of animals that occurs the Goldstream Formation is completely lacking in the Eva Formation and Gold Hill Loess underlying it.

Frozen rodent nests and caches, are commonly found in the Goldstream Formation. They are about 2.5 to 10 cm (0.98 to 3.94 in) long and 7.6 cm (3.0 in) thick and contain abundant well preserved coprolites along with fragments and seeds of herbaceous plants.

Invertebrate fossils occur infrequently in the Goldstream Formation. They consist of insects, terrestrial and aquatic mollusks, and freshwater sponge spicules.

The Goldstream Formation contains abundant plant remains in addition to peat beds. Most of these remains consist of unmineralized, horizontal sticks that are 2.5 to 13 cm (0.98 to 5.12 in) in diameter and in situ stumps. In situ stumps of spruce and birch covered with sphagnum mosses have been observed in one peat layer. Some of the wood has been incorporated in fossil beaver dams. Except for discoloration, some of this wood is as fresh as if just buried. When it thaws and dries, this wood cracks. Locally, some of the stumps and logs found in the Goldstream Formation are badly splintered. Diatoms are common in Goldstream Formation.

== Age ==
The Goldstream Formation is currently thought to have accumulated during the Wisconsin Stage. More than 60 samples of organic materials, including wood and vertebrate soft tissue, from the Goldstream Formation have yielded radiocarbon dates ranging from older than 10,000 BP at its top of this geologic formation to circa 38,500 BP near its middle. The most probable age of the underlying, therefore older, buried forest bed of the Eva Formation has established by the thermoluminescence dating of samples of loess above and below it as being 125,000 BP, the time of the warmest part of Marine Isotope Stage 5.

== See also ==
- List of fossiliferous stratigraphic units in Alaska
- Yedoma
