= Baydzharakh =

Rock formation

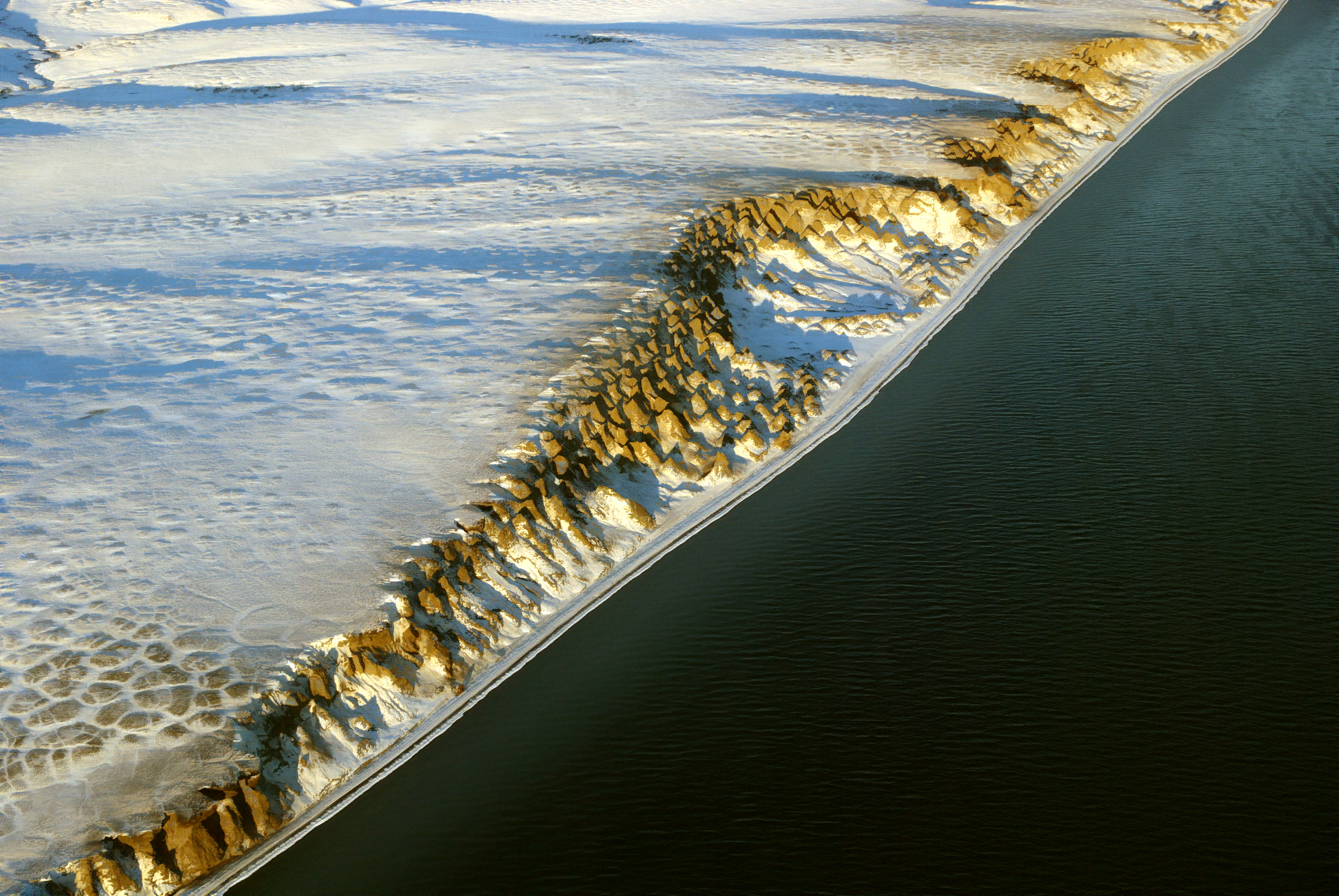
The shoreline formations of Stolbovoy Island. Note the polygons on the lower left and the conical mounds along the seashore.

Baydzharakh (Russian: Байджарах; Yakut: Бадьараах, Baçaraakh) is a term based in the Yakut language, referring to a roughly cone-shaped natural rock formation. They are usually composed of siltstone, silty peat or loam.

== Description ==
Baydzharakhs form owing to thermokarst activity in periglacial areas. They are the result of a cryolithological process by which polygonal ice-wedges thaw within the permafrost. These formations usually reach a height between 5 meters (16 ft) and 10 meters (33 ft) with an area at the base between 15 square meters (160 sq ft) to 20 square meters (220 sq ft).

In the first phase of the ice melting process baydzharakhs have a pillar-like shape. When the ice mass in the surrounding rocks is high, they swell and form rounded depressions known as alas (Алаас) in Yakut. These depressions are usually between 8 meters (26 ft) to 12 meters (39 ft) in depth, but exceptionally may be 30 meters (98 ft) deep. Baydzharakhs come often combined with alas depressions.

Baydzharakh formations are found in different places across the East Siberian Lowland, such as Muostakh Island, Stolbovoy Island, Kotelny Island and the Ulakhan-Sis Range, as well as in scattered places of the Yana-Indigirka Lowland. In 1950 a baydzharakh was the last vestige of now disappeared Semyonovsky Island in the Laptev Sea. They often occur together with Yedoma (Едома) complexes and in areas with ice-wedges of considerable thickness.

== See also ==
- Kigilyakh
