= Buor-Khaya Gulf =

Gulf of the Laptev Sea

- Губа Буор-Хая (Russian)
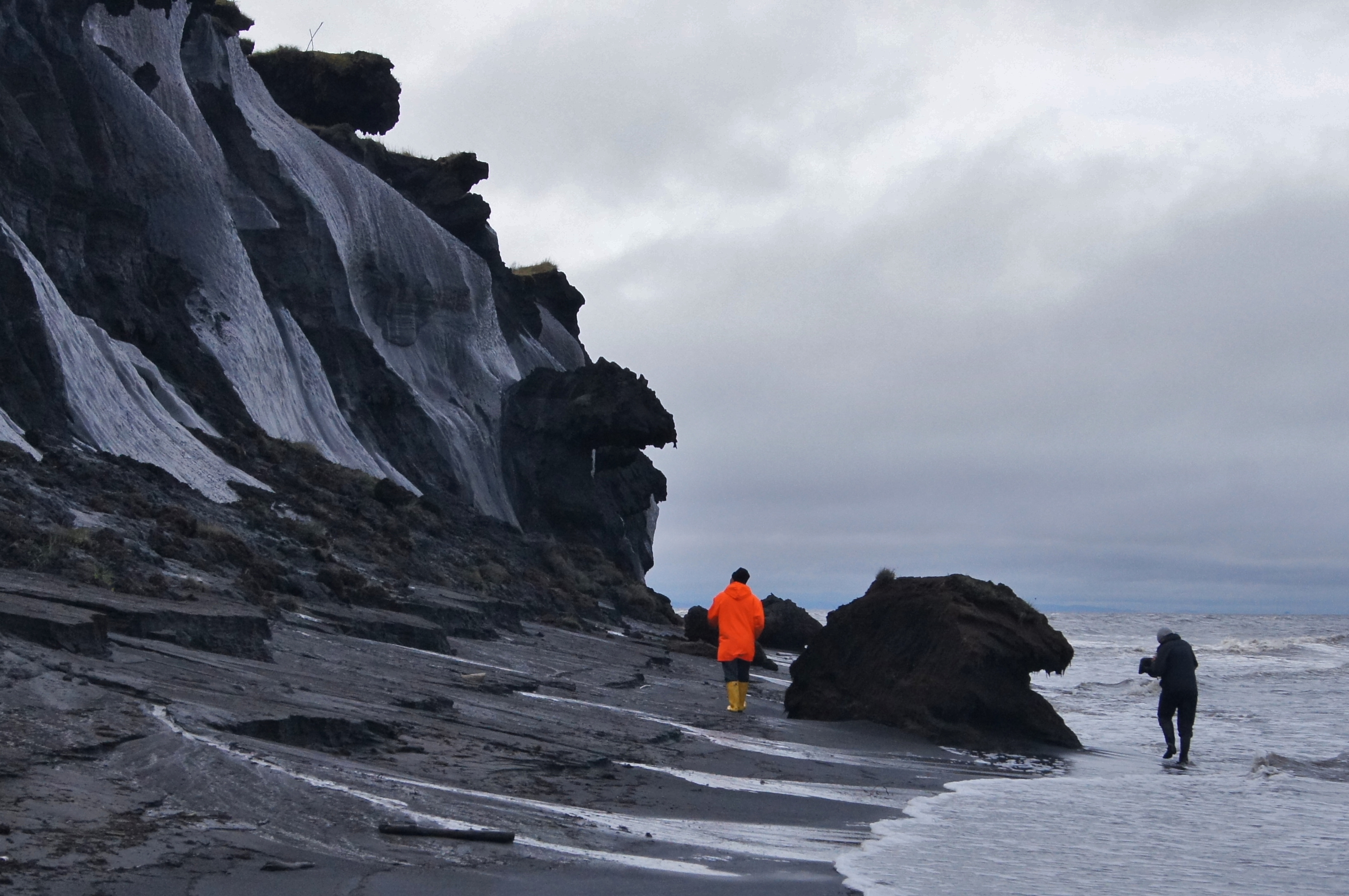
- The shore of Muostakh island in the Buor-Khaya Gulf

- Location of the Buor-Khaya Gulf

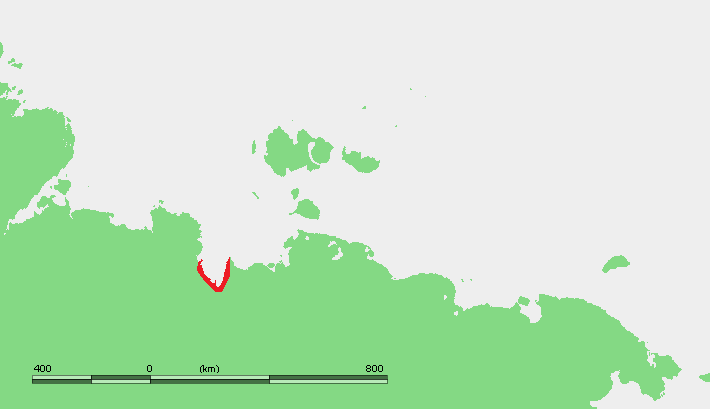
- Location: Far North
- Coordinates: 71°20′N 130°50′E
- River sources: Omoloy River
- Ocean/sea sources: Laptev Sea
- Basin countries: Russia

The Buor-Khaya Gulf or Buor-Khaya Bight (Russian: Губа Буор-Хая) is a gulf of the Laptev Sea. Administratively the Buor-Khaya Gulf belongs to the Sakha Republic (Yakutia) of the Russian Federation.

There is an abandoned polar station in the shores of the Buor-Khaya Gulf.

== Geography ==
It lies at the western end of the Yana-Indigirka Lowland, between the eastern side of the Lena delta on its western side and Cape Buor-Khaya at its NE end. Tiksi Bay and the Bykovsky Peninsula are on the western shores of the Buor-Khaya Gulf.

Heavily eroded Muostakh Island, the remainder of an ancient great plain, is located roughly in the midst of the gulf.

The Omoloy River is the only large river flowing into the Buor-Khaya Gulf, its mouth is located halfway up the eastern coast. The sea in this gulf is frozen for about nine months every year and often clogged with ice floes.

== See also ==
- List of research stations in the Arctic
