= Stolbovoy Island =

Stolbovoy Столбовой остров
- Island
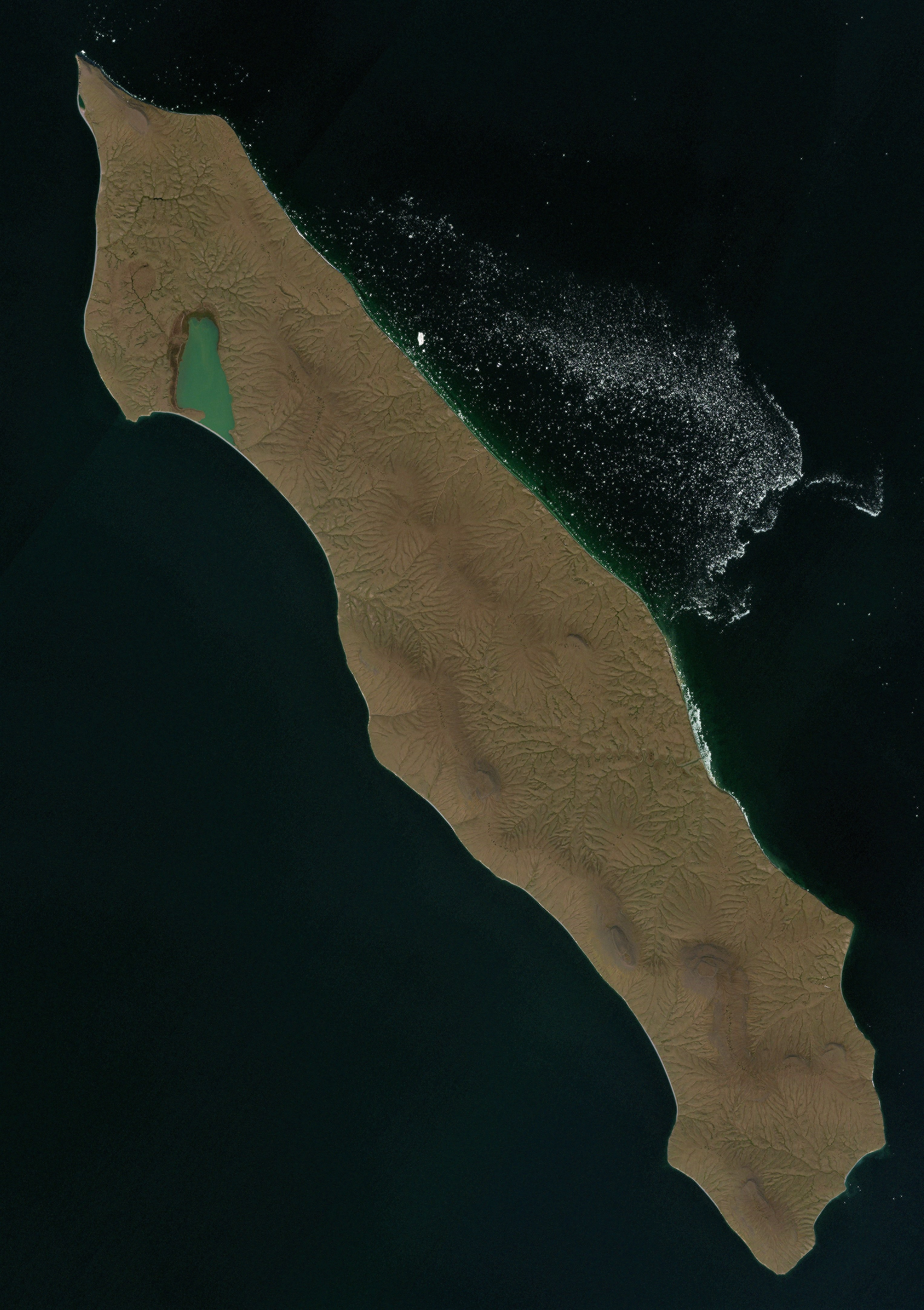
- Satellite image of Stolbovoy Island (Sentinel-2, 2019-08-03).

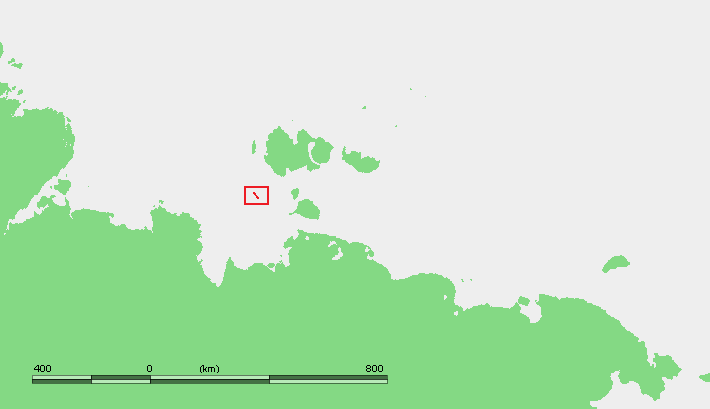
- Location of Stolbovoy Island

- Location within Sakha Republic
- Coordinates: 74°04′15″N 135°59′30″E
- Country: Russian Federation
- Federal subject: Far Eastern Federal District
- Republic: Sakha Republic

Area
  - Total: 170 km^{2} (66 sq mi)
- Elevation: 222 m (728 ft)

Population
  - Total: uninhabited

Stolbovoy Island (Russian: Столбовой остров) is a long and narrow island of the Sakha Republic off the southwest side of the New Siberian Islands in the eastern part of the Laptev Sea. It is located 184 kilometres (114 mi) away from the Siberian coast and 100 kilometres (62 mi) southwest of Kotelny Island, being thus quite detached from the New Siberian island group. It belongs to the Lyakhovsky Islands subgroup.

== History ==
According to Russian tradition in 1690 the Boyar Maxim Mukhoplev visited the island and found a number of crosses, the tombs of Russian seafarers who had previously been there. Stolbovoy was first charted by Yakov Sannikov in 1800.

There was a meteorological station located on the north-west coast of the island at the time of the USSR. In 2012 an automatic GLONASS (Global Navigation Satellite System) monitoring facility was installed in the same spot. Presently the island belongs to the Sakha Republic administrative division of the Russian Federation.

== Geography and climate ==
Stolbovoy Island's area is approximately 170 square kilometres (66 sq mi). Its length is 47 kilometres (29 mi) and its maximum width is 10 kilometres (6.2 mi). The northernmost point of the island was named Cape Toll, in honor of Russian explorer Eduard Toll. There is a 5 km long lake in the northwest of the island. It is separated from the sea by a narrow spit. There is a 13 kilometres (8.1 mi) long river, the Stolbovoy River, running northwards across the central part of the island.

The highest point of Stolbovoy Island is 222 metres (728 ft). The island has 15–70 metres (49–230 ft) high rocky cliffs, the lower relief down to the beach being dominated by conical mound-like stony structures.

The climate in the area is exceptionally severe, with prolonged, bitter winters, so that the waters of the Laptev Sea around Stolbovoy Island are covered by ice most of the year.

== Geology ==
Tectonically deformed sedimentary rock that accumulated during the Late Jurassic to Early Cretaceous periods comprises Stolbovoy Island. These turbidites, which contain the fossils of Bivalvia, consist of beds of sandstone coarsely and rhythmically interbedded with beds of siltstone and argillite. These rocks have been folded into a synclinal structure, thrust faulted, and intruded by small quartz diorite dikes.

== Vegetation ==
Cryptogam herb covers practically barren Stolbovoy Island. All vegetation consists of dry to wet barren landscapes with scattered herbs, lichens, mosses, and liverworts. Sedges, dwarf shrubs, and peaty mires are normally absent. These plants form a sparse (2–40%) and low-growing plant cover. The plants often grow in coarse-grained and often calcareous sediments

== Views ==
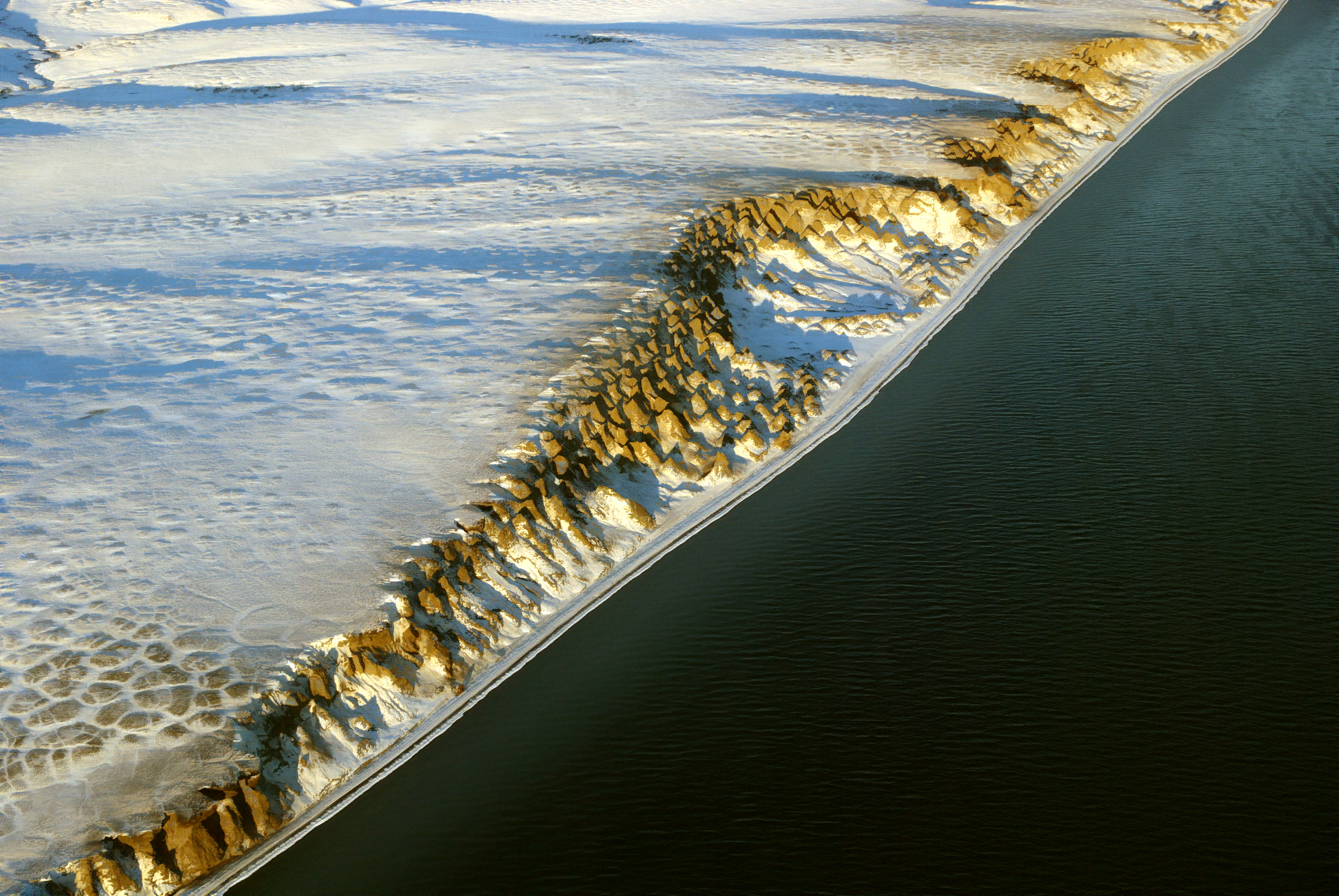
Part of the coast of Stolbovoy showing the cliff formations.

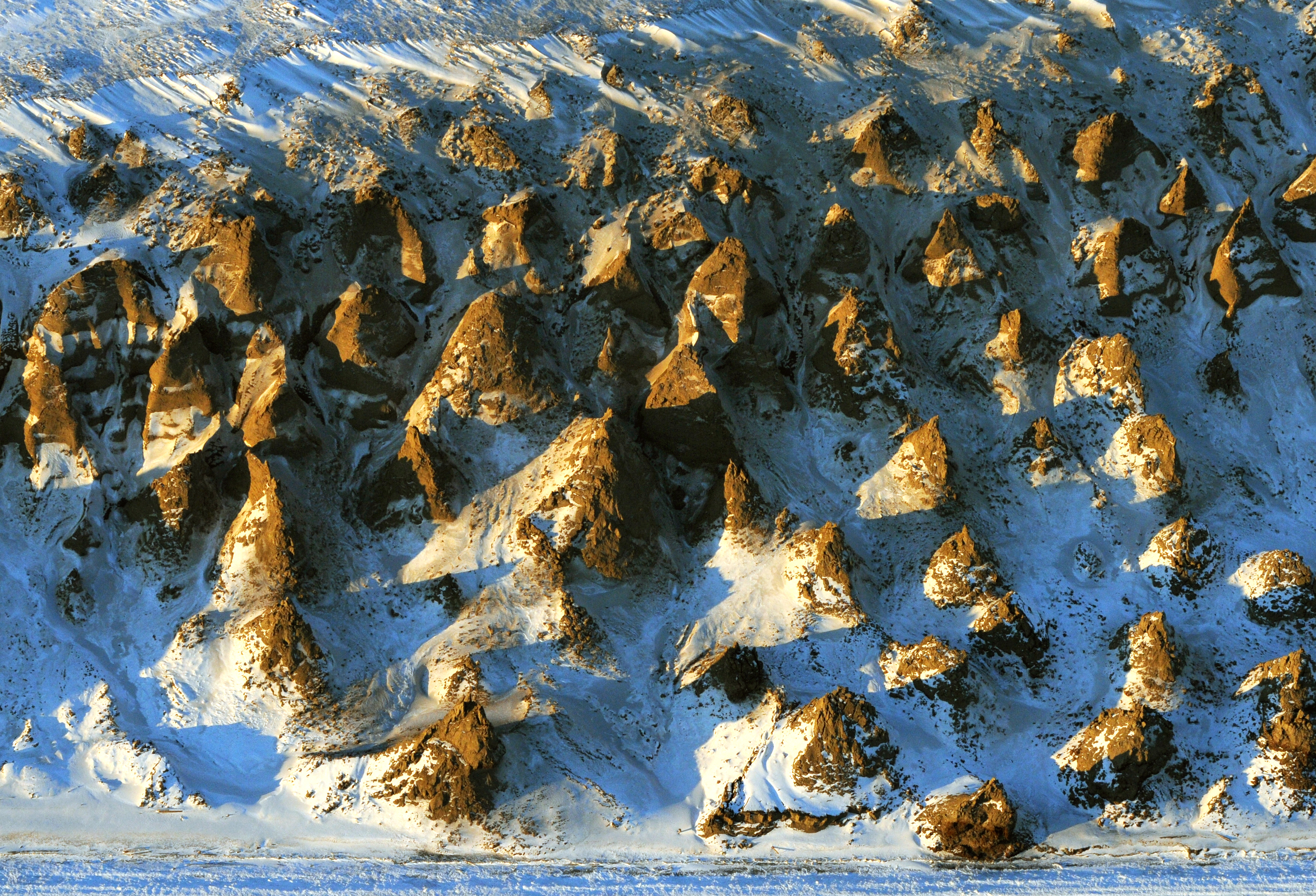
The odd stony structures in the cliffs on Stolbovoy.

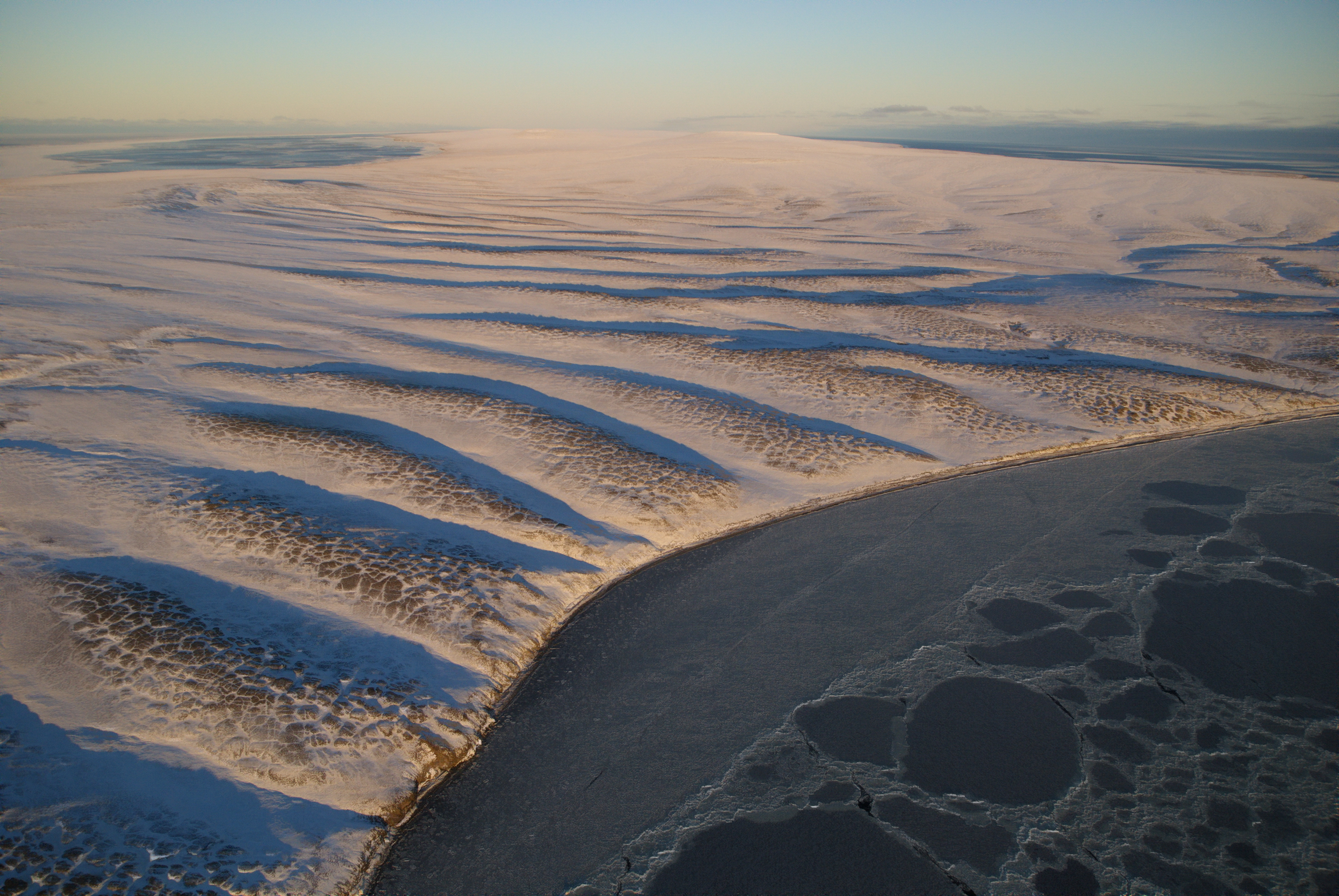
The undulated and desolate terrain of Stolbovoy.

== See also ==
- Lyakhovsky Islands
- Kigilyakh
- Baydzharakh
