= Eva Formation =

Sangamonian interglacial geologic formation and marker horizon found in Central Alaska

- Stratigraphic range: Sangamonian Stage; 0.125–0.12 Ma
- Type: Geological formation
- Unit of: Alaska muck or Alaska silt (informal)
- Underlies: Goldstream Formation
- Overlies: Gold Hill Loess
- Thickness: 0.5–1 m (1.6–3.3 ft)

Lithology
- Primary: silt
- Other: peat and forest bed

Location
- Coordinates: 64°50′37″N 147°43′23″W
- Region: central Arizona, .
- Country: United States of America
- Extent: Tanana and Yukon river drainage basins Alaska.

Type section
- Named for: Eva Creek
- Named by: Troy L. Péwé

The Eva Formation is a geologic formation in Alaska that consists of a typically 0.5 to 1 m (1.6 to 3.3 ft) thick layer of tightly rooted organic-rich silt and soil that contains lenses of peat. It is a well-developed forest bed containing logs, sticks, and rooted and unrooted tree stumps. It is thicker and greatly disturbed where subsequent slumping and solifluction has moved and redeposited it into preexisting valleys in the pre-Goldstream Formation landscape. It unconformably overlies the moderately eroded and slumped sediments of the Gold Hill Loess. It conformably underlies and grades upward into the Goldstream Formation. In Alaskan stratigraphy, the Eva Formation represents an interglacial forest bed and important marker horizon that contains an important Sangamonian high-latitude, paleoenvironmental record.

== Nomenclature ==
During the late 1800s and early 1900s, field geologists discovered that a blanket of silty, often clayey, organic-rich, massive to weakly bedded sediments flank both sides of the Yukon River and its tributaries. These fine-grained sediments are as much as 15–60 m (49–197 ft), or more, thick and overlie bedrock and gold-bearing stream gravels. Where cut into by streams and rivers and gold mining operations, they form steep bluffs. These sediments were found to contain Pleistocene and, possibly Pliocene, terrestrial vertebrate and invertebrate fossils. In 1892, the name Kowak Clays was proposed for these sediments. In 1898, the name Yukon Silt was also applied to the same set of fine-grained sediments. Both terms were used to designate to the entire thickness of silty sediments overlying gold-bearing gravels on either side of the Yukon River and its tributaries until being abandoned after 1937.

After 1937, the silty sediments that were named either Yukon Silt or Kowak Clays became known informally as either muck or Alaska muck in the published literature. Muck is an informal term used by miners and geologists in the Arctic to refer to predominately dark gray to black silt, which contains a quantity of plant remains, vertebrate fossils, lenses of ice, permafrost, and thin beds of peat and volcanic ash that directly overlie gold-bearing fluvial gravels. Instead of muck, still other researchers used the informal term Alaska silts for the same silty sediments. The term upland silt designated loess deposits blanketing the upland terrain that grade laterally downslope into muck and accumulated contemporaneously with it.

Starting in 1936, Giddings recognized and studied buried forest beds found at various levels within the muck (Yukon Silt or Kowak Clays) deposits. This research started while he was employed for the Fairbanks Exploration Company's placer gold mining operations along Engineer Creek, 16 km (9.9 mi) north of Fairbanks, Alaska. Within the muck deposits, Giddons mapped four, laterally persistent beds composed of buried spruce forests at different depths below its surface. Within the muck, the oldest forest grew on a buried surface just above the top of the gold-bearing gravels and the youngest buried forest grew on a buried surface 1.5 to 3.5 m (4.9 to 11.5 ft) below the pre-mining, modern surface. Using tree rings, he was able to construct separate floating, or undated, dendochronologies for each level of buried spruce forest found within the local muck.

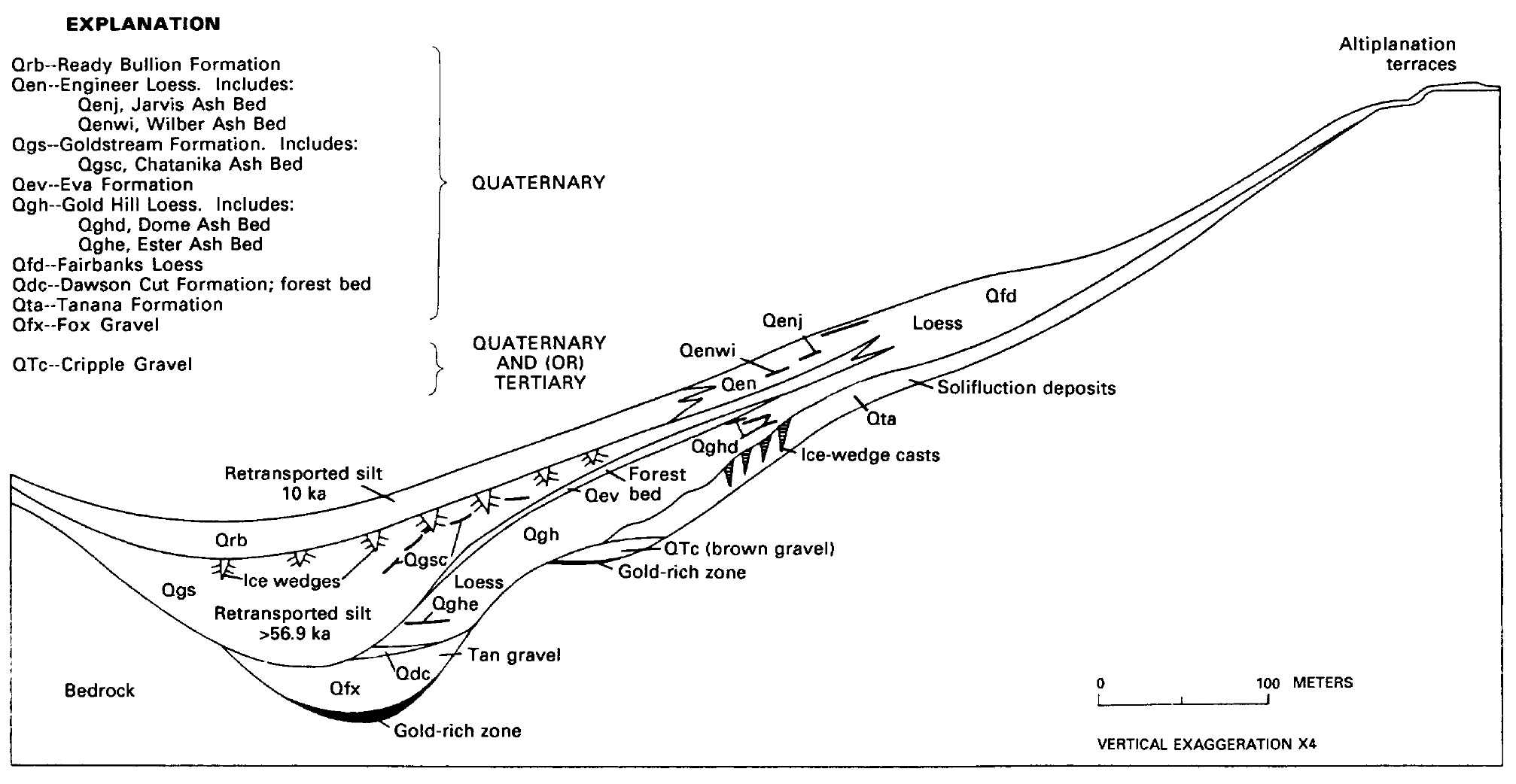
Schematic composite cross section of creek valley near Fairbanks illustrating stratigraphic relations of Goldstream Formation and associated Quaternary deposits.

In the summers of 1946, 1947, 1948, 1949, and 1951, Péwé conducted detailed field research concerning the geomorphology and Quaternary geology of the Fairbanks region while an employee of the United States Geological Survey. As a result of this research, he initially subdivided the Alaska muck (Alaska silt) into four informal stratigraphic units. These units include the (1) Dawson muck, (2) Goldstream muck, (3) Gold Hill loess, and (4) Engineer muck. After years of additional detailed field research for the United States Geological Survey, Péwé subdivided the informal Alaska muck (Alaska Silt) into formal geologic formations and formally defined them. From youngest to oldest, these geologic formations include the Ready Bullion Formation (Holocene), Engineer Loess (Holocene), informal Gibbons forest bed (Holocene), Goldstream Formation (Wisconsin), Eva Formation (forest bed)(Sangamon), Gold Hill Loess (PreSangamon to Pliocene), and Dawson Cut Formation (forest bed)(Pliocene), Tanana Formation (Pliocene), Fox Gravel (Pliocene) and Cripple Gravel (Pliocene). The Fairbanks Loess became the formal name for the upland silts. The gold-bearing gravels were formally divided into the Cripple and Fox gravels.

== Description ==
The Eva Formation consists of black, frozen loess-like silt that contains numerous peat lenses, sticks, logs, rooted stumps, and finely disseminated, carbonized plant fragments. The silt is reworked loess that has been pedogenically altered into soil. The woody material, other organic matter, soil, and silt are tightly matted and perennially frozen together into a relatively resistant layer about 0.5 to 1 m (1.6 to 3.3 ft). The Eva Formation's contact with the underlying the Gold Hill Loess is an erosional unconformity that is often angular where the Gold Hill Loess has been deformed and tilted either during or prior to being eroded. The contact with the overlying Goldstream Formation is conformably and typically gradational.

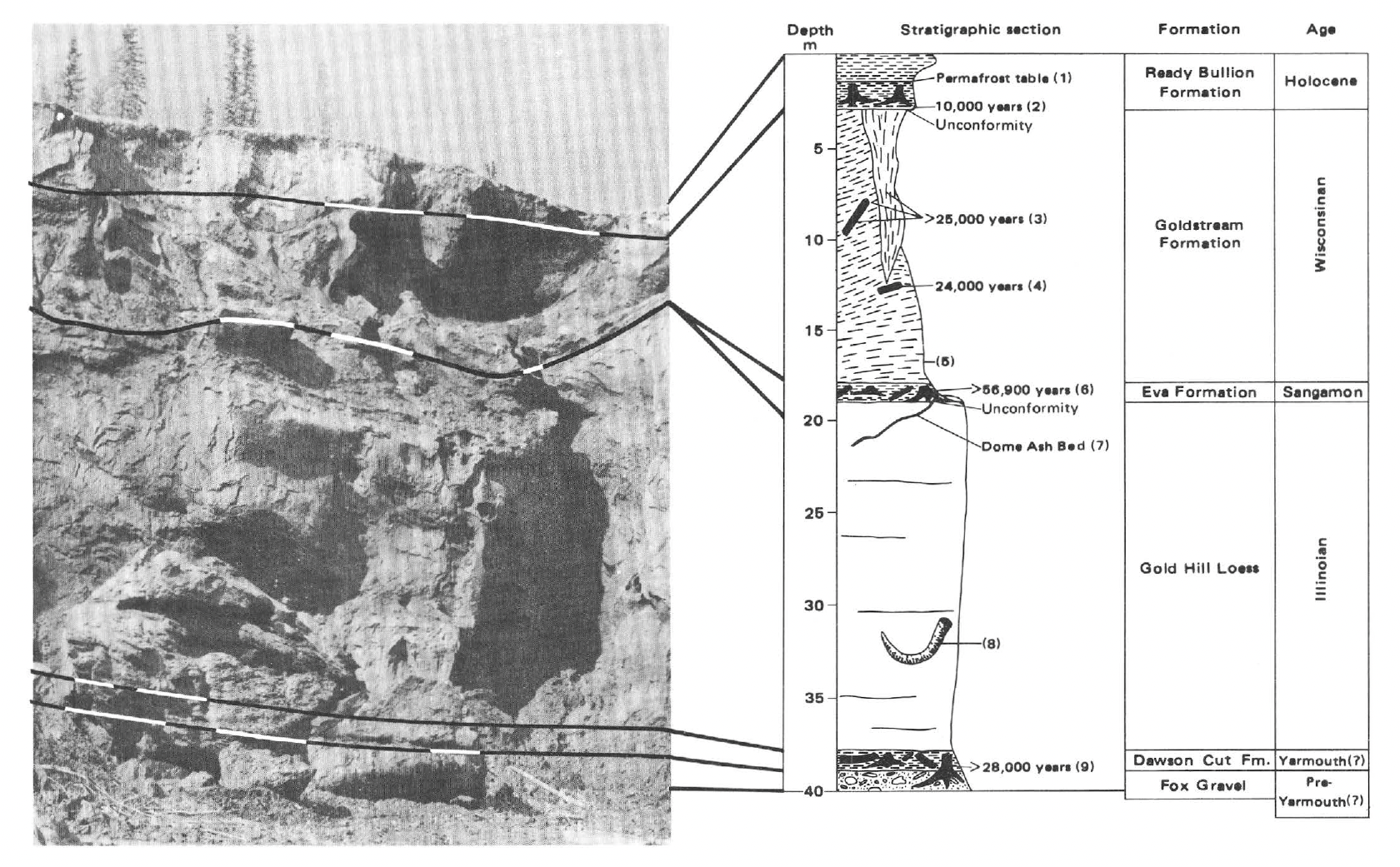
Outcrop and stratigraphy of Quaternary deposits in Eva Mining Cut, Fairbanks, Alaska, region.

The preservation and nature of the Eva Formation varies depending on what segment of the prehistoric forest cantena is exposed. On the top of low hills and on the higher parts of lower slopes, or, only as local patches, it consists of a well preserved and extensive buried forest bed hundreds of meters long. Elsewhere, where the prehistoric forest catena is degraded by erosion, Eva Formation may exist as (1) isolated logs and stumps grading into just a single stump, (2) simply wood fragments, or (3) a woody silt.

Where it is well preserved, the Eva Formation forms a prominent topographic bench between the Goldstream Formation and Gold Hill Loess in mining exposures. As illustrated by figures in Gutherie, Matthews, and Pewe. The prominent bench is formed by the presence of a tightly matted forest bed containing rooted and unrooted stumps. Only in the artificial exposures created by mining operations does the Eva Formation outcrop.

== Fossils ==
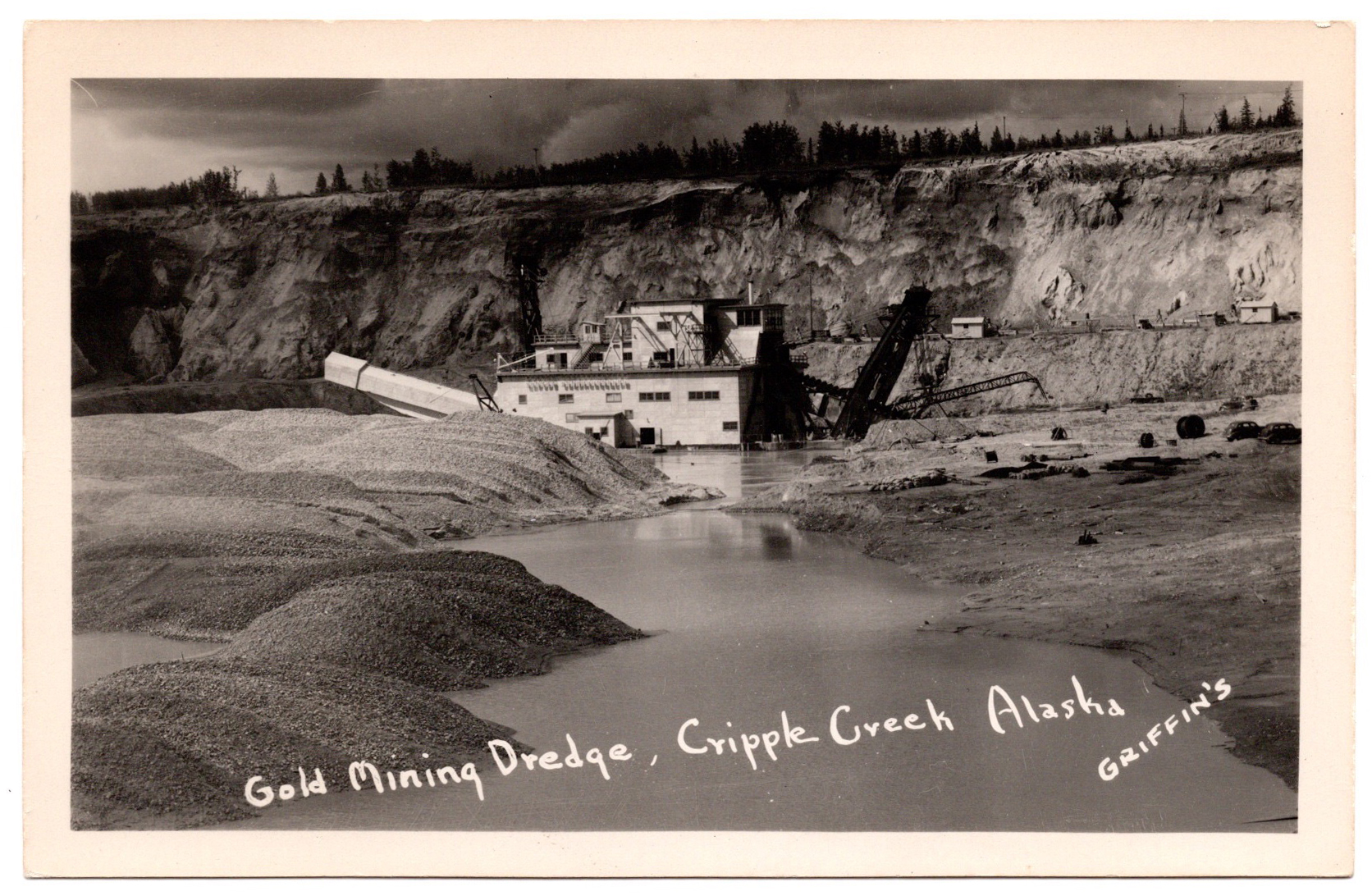
Gold mining dredge at Cripple Creek, Alaska mining cut circa 1942. On far right, intact and unslumped section exposed in highwall of cut. uppermost, light-colored layer is part of Ready Bullion Formation underlain by dark-colored layer of its Giddings Forest Bed. Light-colored Goldstream Formation resting on thin, dark-colored, and less well exposed layer of Eva Formation (Eva Forest Bed). Between the Eva Forest Bed and bench, on which sheds rest, consists of Gold Hill Loess. Dawson Cut forest Bed at base is concealed beneath accumulated slump sediments. Bench at base of mining cut consists of gold-bearing Pliocene fluvial gravels. As is typical, mining cut that is directly befined and left of gold dredged is badly slumped and jumbled.

The forest bed of the Eva Formation contains an abundance of well-preserved wood in the form of sticks, prostrate logs, numerous rooted and unrooted stumps of birch and white spruce. The tree remains found within the Eva Formation are dominated by spruce with logs as much as 32 cm (13 in) in diameter and 3 m (9.8 ft) long. The spruce remains are predominately white spruce (Picea glauca) rather than black spruce (Picea mariana) as indicated by associated white spruce cones and needles; size of the stem remains; and possibly, the presence of spruce bark beetles. Tree ring analysis of spruce logs and stumps indicate that the trees were 10 to 179 years old when they died.

Remains of birch trees are common in this forest bed. Birch logs are as much as 10 cm (3.9 in) in diameter and 30 cm (12 in) long. Based on the well-preserved bark, Betula papyrifera is judged to be the most common species of birch. This forest bed also contains the not very abundant and small specimens of willow and poplar. The composition and size of tree remains appears to be consistent with the modern boreal forest.

The logs, stumps, roots, cones and host of wood fragments of this forest bed were preserved by their buried by silt. On slopes, these plant remains were mostly buried rapidly by silt as it was eroded from either the Gold Hill Loess or washed down hill. At other locations, the wood was gradually buried by the accumulation of early Wisconsin airfall loess. Slow decay of the buried wood likely continued until the enclosing organic-rich silt became perennially frozen. Any soft animal tissue would have decayed long before this silty sediment became perennially frozen. Once frozen, the sediment and enclosed plant remains likely remained frozen until exposed by gold mining operations.

Except for the detailed research of Edwards and McDowell, the pollen of the Eva Formation has not been studied in an adequate manner. Edwards and McDowell found that the pollen assemblage from the silty sediments contemporaneous with the Eva Formation at Birch Creek near Circle City, Alaska, yielded the pollen of Picea, Betula, Alnus, Populus, and Salix. Pollen of Typha latifolia and aquatic taxa such as Myriophyllum also were found. This pollen assemblage indicated a closed boreal forest similar to a modern forest with Typha latifolia near its northern limit.

Despite the abundance of vertebrate fossils of large and small mammals in the Gold Hill Loess and Goldstream formations, which bracket the Eva Formation, only the fossils of small vertebrates have been found in situ in the Eva Formation. At the type section in Eva Creek cut, Gutherie recovered teeth of long-tailed ground squirrel (Citellus ndulatus) and narrow-headed vole (Stenocranius gregalis) from an in situ silt sample, sample 9, containing spruce wood from the Eva Formation.

The only invertebrate fossils reported from the Eva Formation are the remains of beetles and other insects. They were recovered from Sample Eva 3-1A that Matthew collected from his Eva Creek Exposure. Wood associated with the sample was dated at greater than 56,900 BP (Hv-1328).

== Age ==
Judging from its fossil flora, Eva Formation and associated forest bed and underlying unconformity represents a prominent stratigraphic break that is interglacial in nature. This stratigraphic break has been informally designated as the Eva Interglaciation and assigned to the latest interglaciation, the Sangamonian Stage and Marine Isotope Stage 5 because it position underlying the Wisconsin Goldstream Formation.

The interglacial event recorded in the Eva Formation has been quantitatively demonstrated to be equivalent to the last interglaciation. The Sangamonian age of the Eva Formation is supported by a radiocarbon date of greater than 56,900 BP (Hv-1328) obtained from well preserved wood recovered from it associated forest bed. Also, Westgate dated the Old Crow tephra, which immediately underlies the Eva Formation, to 149,000±13,000. In addition, Windgate and others further constrained the age of the underlying Old Crow tephra to 140,000±10,000, which strongly supports the Eva Formation being Sangamonian in age. In addition, thermoluminescence dating of samples of silt and loess from above and below the unconformity associated with the Eva Formation by Berger yielded dates bracketing the Sangamonian Stage. These dates, together with paleoenvironmental indicators show that the forest bed of the Eva Formation formed during the latter part of the warm interval that caused the erosion and slumping that formed the associated unconformity cut into the Gold Hill Loess. Constrained by radiometric dating to between 57,000 BP and 140,000 BP, this warm interval can be presumed to have occurred during the Sangamonian Stage interglacial.

== See also ==
List of fossiliferous stratigraphic units in Alaska
