= Semyonovsky Island =

Semyonovsky остров Семёновский
- Island
- Location within Sakha Republic
- Coordinates: 74°15′10″N 133°55′30″E
- Country: Russian Federation
- Federal subject: Far Eastern Federal District
- Republic: Sakha Republic

Semyonovsky Island ('о. Семёновский' in Russian) was an island in the Lyakhovsky Islands subgroup of the New Siberian Islands. It was located in the southwestern area of the archipelago, in the eastern part of the Laptev Sea.

Before its disappearance, it was at 4 square kilometres (1.5 sq mi), one of the smallest islands in the archipelago. In 1945, just before it disappeared, its sea cliffs rose about 24 metres (79 ft) above sea level.

== History ==
Mr. I. Lyakhov, a merchant from Yakutsk, discovered this island in 1770. He discovered it by following the tracks of an enormous herd of reindeer across frozen sea ice. Czarina Catherine II rewarded him for discovering this and another island in the New Siberian Island archipelago with the exclusive rights to collect fossil ivory from them.

After its discovery, Semyonovsky Island rapidly decreased in size until it disappeared between 1952 and the early 1960s. The area of Semyonovsky Island was 4.6 km^{2} (1.8 sq mi) in 1823, 0.9 km^{2} (0.35 sq mi) in 1912, 0.5 km^{2} (0.19 sq mi) in 1936, and 0.2 km^{2} (0.077 sq mi) in 1945. In 1950, it was only a solitary baydzharakh (thermokarst mound). By 1952, it had been eroded down into a sand bar lying just above the sea surface. When Semyonovsky Island was visited in the early 1960s, it had vanished and only a sand shoal with an average depth of 10 metres (33 ft) and minimum depth of 0.2 metres (7.9 in) remained.
