= Alas (geography) =

Shallow depression formed by subsidence of the Arctic permafrost

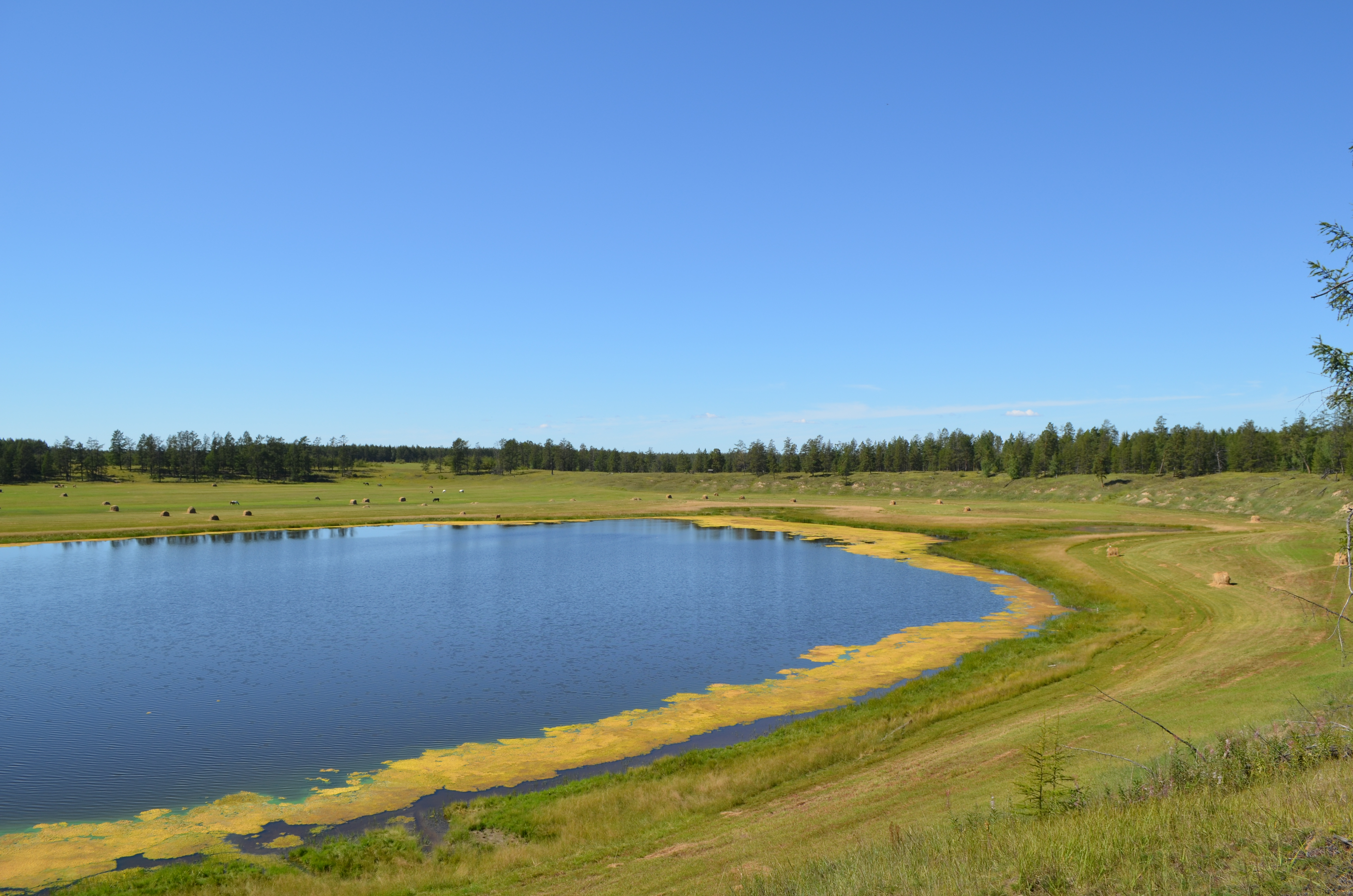
Alas Mamykan near Mayya.

Alas (Yakut: Алаас) is a shallow depression which occurs primarily in Yakutia, which is formed by subsidence of the Arctic permafrost owing to repeated melting and refreezing. An alas first develops as a shallow lake as melt water fills the depression. The lake eventually dries out and is replaced by grasses and other herbaceous vegetation.

== Examples ==
An alas is different from thermokarst depressions found elsewhere in the Arctic in that the lake is only temporary. Due to the aridity of Yakutia, the lake will dry up once the underlying ice has been depleted.

Alases are often used for pasturage for horses as well as hay-fields. They are common in the Central Yakutian Lowland. The largest alas in the world is Myuryu, located in Ust-Aldan District.

The alas also hold great cultural importance. During the festival of Ysyakh, the traditional Yakut New Year’s day celebrated in the summer, as many as 20,000 gather to an alas in the general vicinity of Yakutsk. Other minor celebrations occur at other alas across the Republic of Sakha. Once set up there, temporary Uraha (Yakut: Ураһа), which are homes made of birch bark are constructed among other wooden idols and structures.

== See also ==
- Baydzharakh
- Yedoma
