= Cape Buor-Khaya =

Headland in Sakha, Russia

Cape Buor-Khaya Мыс Буор-Хая
- Cape
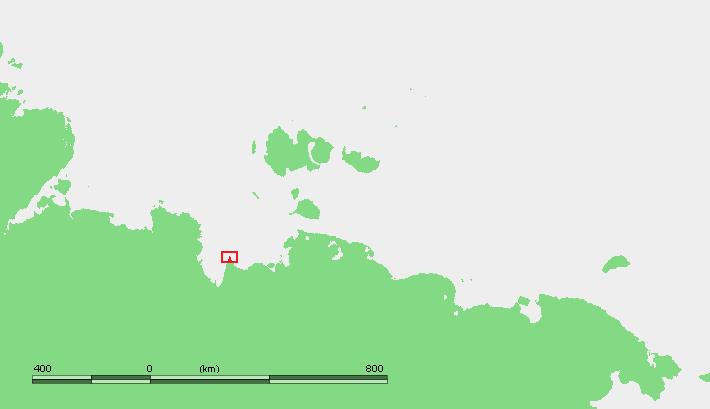
- Location of Cape Buor-Khaya

- Location within Russia
- Coordinates: 71°56′38″N 132°47′38″E
- Location: Sakha (Yakutia), Russia
- Water bodies: Laptev Sea

Area
  - Total: Russian Far East

Cape Buor Khaya, (Russian: Мыс Буор-Хая; Mys Buor-Khaya) is a headland in the Laptev Sea.

== Geography ==
It is located between the Buor-Khaya Gulf on the west and the Yana Bay on the east. It is a conspicuous headland and has an 11 m high light on a framework tower.

The sea in the area surrounding the cape is frozen for about nine months every year and often clogged with ice floes. On its eastern side there is a long semi-submerged landspit known as Kosa Buor-Khaya.

Administratively the Buor-Khaya Cape belongs to the Sakha Republic (Yakutia) of the Russian Federation.

== Climate ==
The area has a subarctic climate (Dfc) bordering on a tundra climate (ET).

Climate data for Cape Buor-Khaya
Month	Jan	Feb	Mar	Apr	May	Jun	Jul	Aug	Sep	Oct	Nov	Dec	Year
Record high °C (°F)	4.9 (40.8)	8.2 (46.8)	8.7 (47.7)	15.0 (59.0)	28.0 (82.4)	33.0 (91.4)	34.0 (93.2)	31.0 (87.8)	26.0 (78.8)	18.0 (64.4)	10.0 (50.0)	16.0 (60.8)	34.0 (93.2)
Mean daily maximum °C (°F)	−16.5 (2.3)	−15.7 (3.7)	−10.0 (14.0)	−3.6 (25.5)	4.3 (39.7)	11.5 (52.7)	14.6 (58.3)	13.3 (55.9)	9.1 (48.4)	−1.1 (30.0)	−10.5 (13.1)	−15.7 (3.7)	−2.1 (28.2)
Daily mean °C (°F)	−19.5 (−3.1)	−18.9 (−2.0)	−13.4 (7.9)	−6.9 (19.6)	1.0 (33.8)	7.8 (46.0)	10.8 (51.4)	10.1 (50.2)	6.4 (43.5)	−3.6 (25.5)	−13.2 (8.2)	−18.6 (−1.5)	−5.3 (22.5)
Mean daily minimum °C (°F)	−22.6 (−8.7)	−22.2 (−8.0)	−17.2 (1.0)	−10.6 (12.9)	−2.6 (27.3)	4.3 (39.7)	7.3 (45.1)	7.0 (44.6)	3.9 (39.0)	−6.2 (20.8)	−16.3 (2.7)	−21.5 (−6.7)	−8.5 (16.7)
Record low °C (°F)	−51.0 (−59.8)	−48.0 (−54.4)	−43.9 (−47.0)	−38.9 (−38.0)	−28.0 (−18.4)	−13.9 (7.0)	−7.2 (19.0)	−3.0 (26.6)	−10.0 (14.0)	−32.0 (−25.6)	−48.0 (−54.4)	−51.0 (−59.8)	−51.0 (−59.8)
