= Muostakh Island =

Island in the Buor-Khaya Gulf of the Laptev Sea

Native name: Остров Муостах
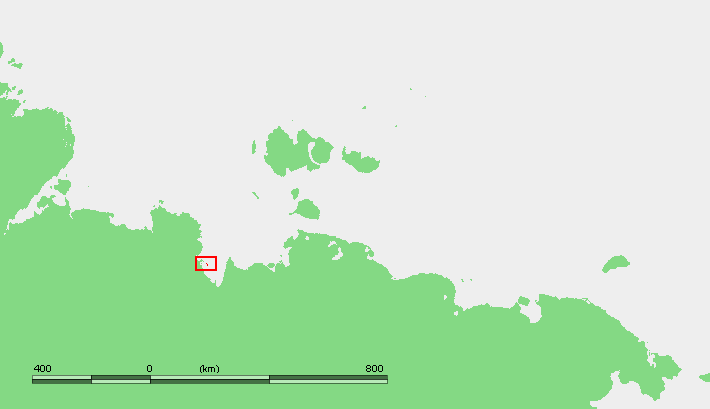
- Location of Muostakh Island in the Buor-Khaya Bay.
- Interactive map of Muostakh Island

Geography
- Location: Laptev Sea
- Coordinates: 71°34′30″N 130°0′40″E
- Length: 13 km (8.1 mi)
- Width: 0.5 km (0.31 mi)

Administration
- Russia
- Republic: Sakha

Demographics
- Population: uninhabited

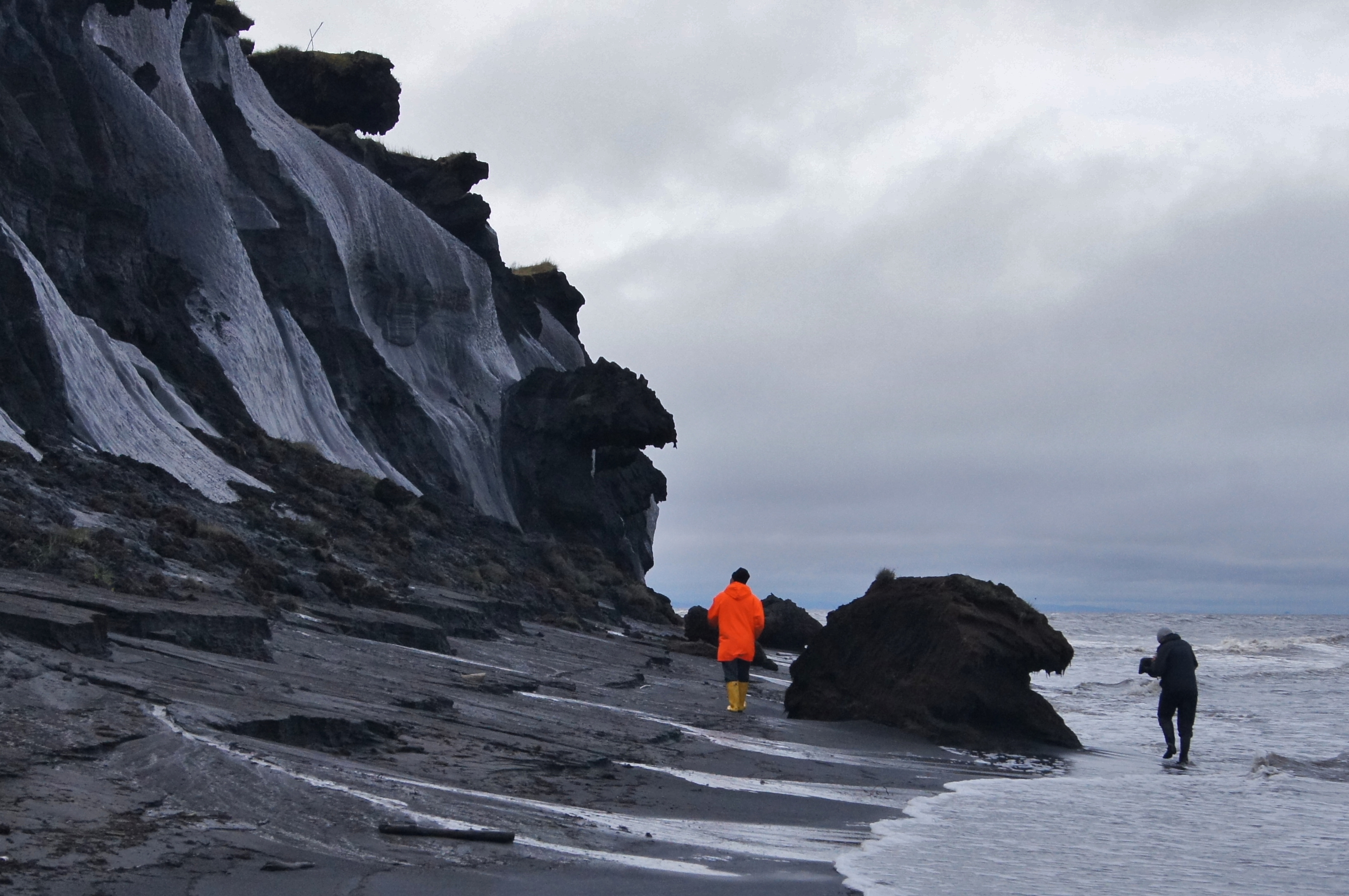
Coast of Muostakh island

Muostakh Island (Russian: Остров Муостах), also spelled "Mostakh", is an island in the Buor-Khaya Gulf of the Laptev Sea. It is located off the eastern side of the Lena delta, enclosing the Tiksi Bay, about 35 km ESE of Tiksi.

== Geography ==
Muostakh Island is long and narrow; its length is 13 km and its maximum breadth about 0.5 km on average. Off its southern tip lies a much smaller 2 km long island of similar characteristics. The area where Muostakh Island lies, is subject to severe Arctic weather with frequent gales and blizzards. The sea in the bay is frozen for about nine months every year and often clogged with ice floes. There are 4 to 5 m wide baydzharakhs on the island.

Administratively Muostakh Island belongs to the Sakha Republic (Yakutia) of the Russian Federation. There is a weather and biological research station in Muostakh Island.

=== Heavy erosion ===
Geologically Muostakh Island is the remainder of an ancient great plain that was part of the Siberian continental about two thousand years ago. The strait which now separates the island from the mainland was just beginning to form at that time. Nowadays its northern headland is subject to spectacular sea erosion, receding at a rate of 6 m a year. Sometimes the receding coastline exposes the bones and tusks of prehistoric animals such as mammoths.
