= Yedoma =

Permafrost soil type

Yedoma /ˈjɛdəmə/ (Russian: е́дома) is an organic-rich (about 2% carbon by mass) Pleistocene-age permafrost with ice content of 50–90% by volume. Yedoma are abundant in the cold regions of eastern Siberia, such as northern Yakutia, as well as in Alaska and the Yukon.

== Characteristics ==
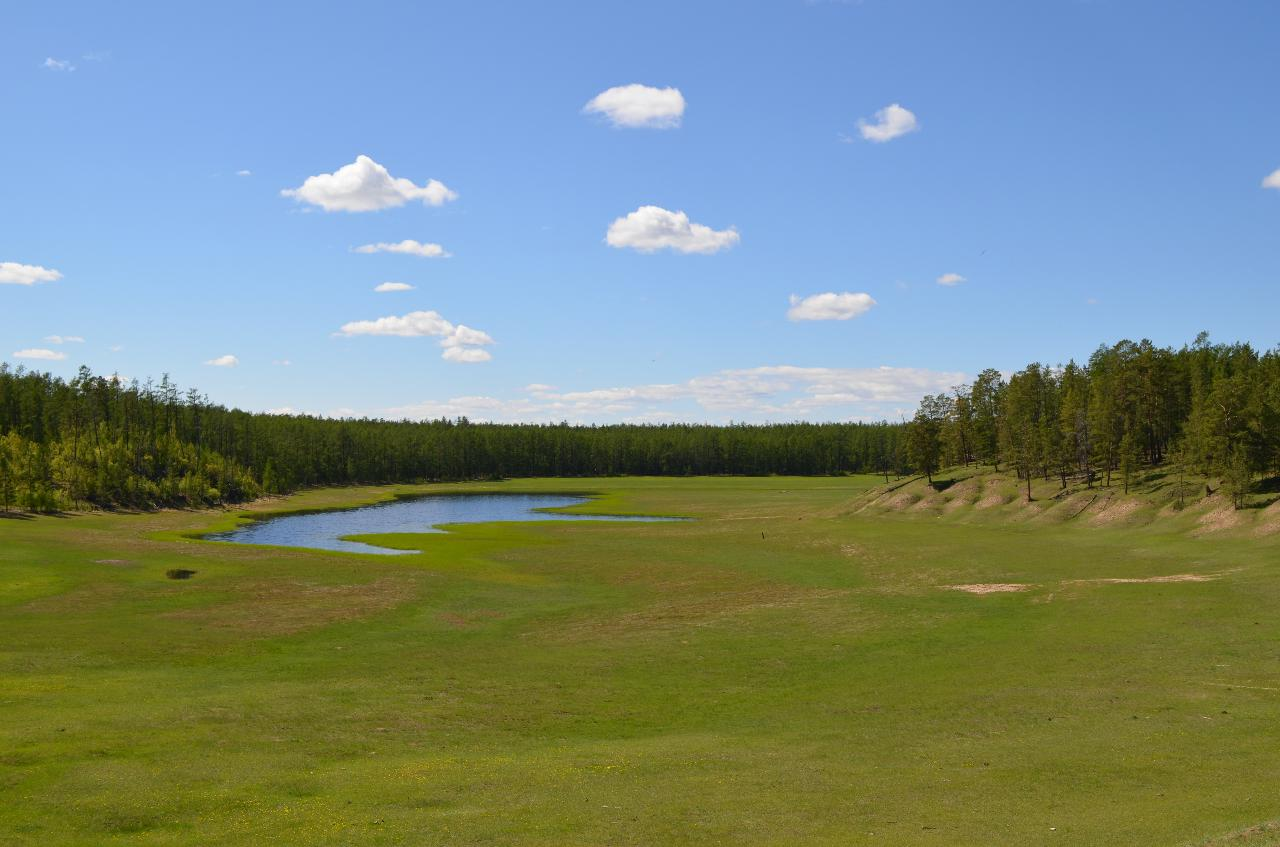
Alas landscape in Megino-Kangalassky District, Yakutia

The landscape of yedoma areas is of glacier plains and hills with shallow depressions known as alas. Yedoma usually form in lowlands or stretches of land with rolling hills where ice wedge polygonal networks are present, in stable relief features with accumulation zones of poor drainage, severe cold and arid continental climate zones resulting in scanty vegetation cover, intense periglacial weathering processes, as well as the proximity of sediment sources, such as low mountain ranges and foothills.

The amount of carbon trapped in this type of permafrost is much more prevalent than originally thought and may be about 210 to 500 Gt, that is a multiple of the amount of carbon released into the air each year by the burning of fossil fuels. Thawing yedoma is a significant source of atmospheric methane (about 4 Tg of CH_{4} per year).

The Yedoma region currently occupies an area of more than one million square kilometers from northeast Siberia to Alaska and Canada, and in many regions is tens of meters thick. During the Last Glacial Maximum, when the global sea level was 120 m lower than that of today, similar deposits covered substantial areas of the exposed northeast Eurasian continental shelves. At the end of the last ice age, at the Pleistocene–Holocene transition, thawing yedoma and the resulting thermokarst lakes may have produced 33 to 87% of the high-latitude increase in atmospheric methane concentration.

== See also ==
- Alas (geography)
- Baydzharakh
