= UTC+09:00 =

Identifier for a time offset from UTC of +9

- Time zone
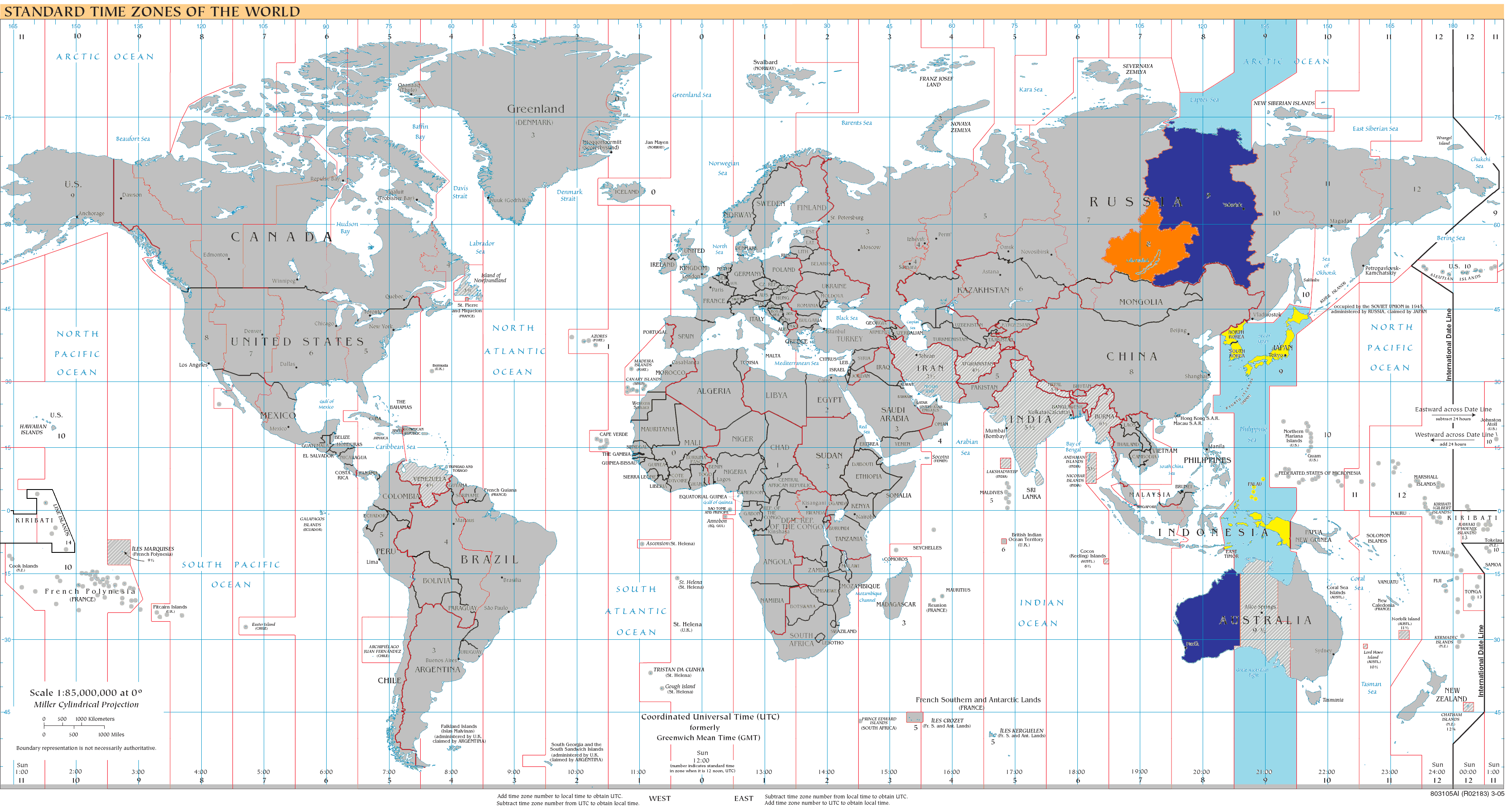
- World map with the time zone highlighted

UTC offset
- UTC: UTC+09:00

Current time
- :: UTC+09:00 [refresh]

Central meridian
- 135 degrees E

Date-time group
- I

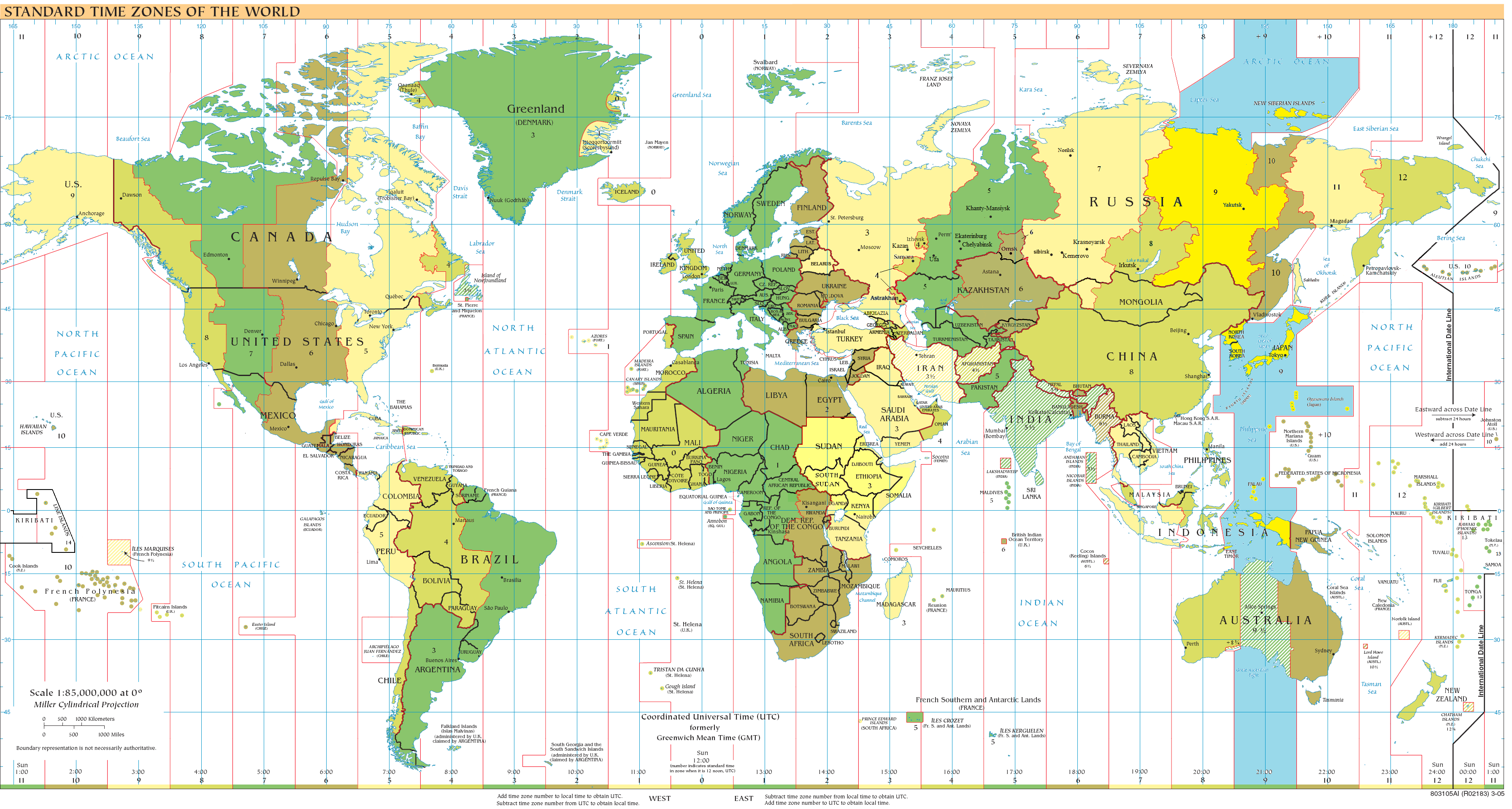
UTC+09:00 in May 2018: blue (December), orange (June), yellow (year-round), light blue (sea areas)

Time in Russia: KALT / Kaliningrad Time / UTC+2 / (MSK−1); MSK / Moscow Time / UTC+3 / (MSK±0); SAMT / Samara Time / UTC+4 / (MSK+1); YEKT / Yekaterinburg Time / UTC+5 / (MSK+2); OMST / Omsk Time / UTC+6 / (MSK+3); KRAT / Krasnoyarsk Time / UTC+7 / (MSK+4); IRKT / Irkutsk Time / UTC+8 / (MSK+5); YAKT / Yakutsk Time / UTC+9 / (MSK+6); VLAT / Vladivostok Time / UTC+10 / (MSK+7); MAGT / Magadan Time / UTC+11 / (MSK+8); PETT / Kamchatka Time / UTC+12 / (MSK+9)

Time in Indonesia
- Map of time zones of Indonesia
- Western Indonesia Time (WIB) UTC offset: UTC+07:00 (WIB+0)
- Central Indonesia Time (WITA) UTC offset: UTC+08:00 (WIB+1)
- Eastern Indonesia Time (WIT) UTC offset: UTC+09:00 (WIB+2)
- Adopted: 1 January 1988
- Time notation: 24-hour clock
- tz database: Asia/Jakarta · Asia/Pontianak · Asia/Makassar · Asia/Jayapura

UTC+09:00 is an identifier for a time offset from UTC of +09:00.

During the Japanese occupations of British Borneo, Burma, Hong Kong, Dutch East Indies, Malaya, Philippines, Singapore, and French Indochina, it was used as a common time with Tokyo until the fall of the Empire of Japan.

== As standard time (year-round) ==
=== Principal cities ===
- South Korea - Jeju, Busan, Ulsan, Geoje, Changwon, Jinju, Daegu, Pohang, Gumi, Yeosu, Gwangju, Mokpo, Iksan, Jeonju, Daejeon, Cheongju, Gangneung, Wonju, Chuncheon, Suwon, Bundang, Seoul, Incheon
- Japan - Wakkanai, Nemuro, Asahikawa, Sapporo, Hakodate, Ominato, Aomori, Sendai, Yamagata, Niigata, Utsunomiya, Tokyo, Hachioji, Saitama, Chiba, Matsudo, Yokohama, Yokosuka, Nagano, Matsumoto, Kanazawa, Toyama, Nagoya, Iwakura, Yokkaichi, Ise, Kyoto, Maizuru, Nara, Osaka, Kaizuka, Sakai, Kobe, Himeji, Okayama, Hiroshima, Kure, Tottori, Izumo, Shimonoseki, Fukuoka, Kitakyushu, Nagasaki, Sasebo, Kumamoto, Kagoshima, Amami, Naha, Itoman, Ishigaki, Yonaguni
- North Korea - Kaesong, Wonsan, Pyongyang, Hamheung, Raseon
- Russia - Yakutsk, Blagoveshchensk, Chita
- Indonesia - Jayapura, Sorong, Ternate, Ambon
- Palau - Koror
- East Timor - Dili

=== North Asia ===
- Russia – Yakutsk Time
  - Far Eastern Federal District
    - Amur Oblast, Sakha Republic (western part; west of the Lena River as well as territories adjacent to the Lena on the eastern side)
    - Zabaykalsky Krai

=== East Asia ===
- South Korea – Korea Standard Time
- North Korea – Korea Standard Time
- Japan – Japan Standard Time

=== Oceania ===
==== Micronesia ====
- Palau – Time in Palau

==== Australia ====
- Arubiddy Station, Western Australia – Arubiddy Time

=== Southeast Asia ===
- Indonesia – Eastern Indonesia Time
  - Eastern zone, including:
    - Maluku Islands
      - Maluku
      - North Maluku
    - Western New Guinea
      - Papua
      - West Papua
      - Central Papua
      - South Papua
      - Southwest Papua
      - Highland Papua
- East Timor – Time in East Timor

== Discrepancies between official UTC+09:00 and geographical UTC+09:00 ==
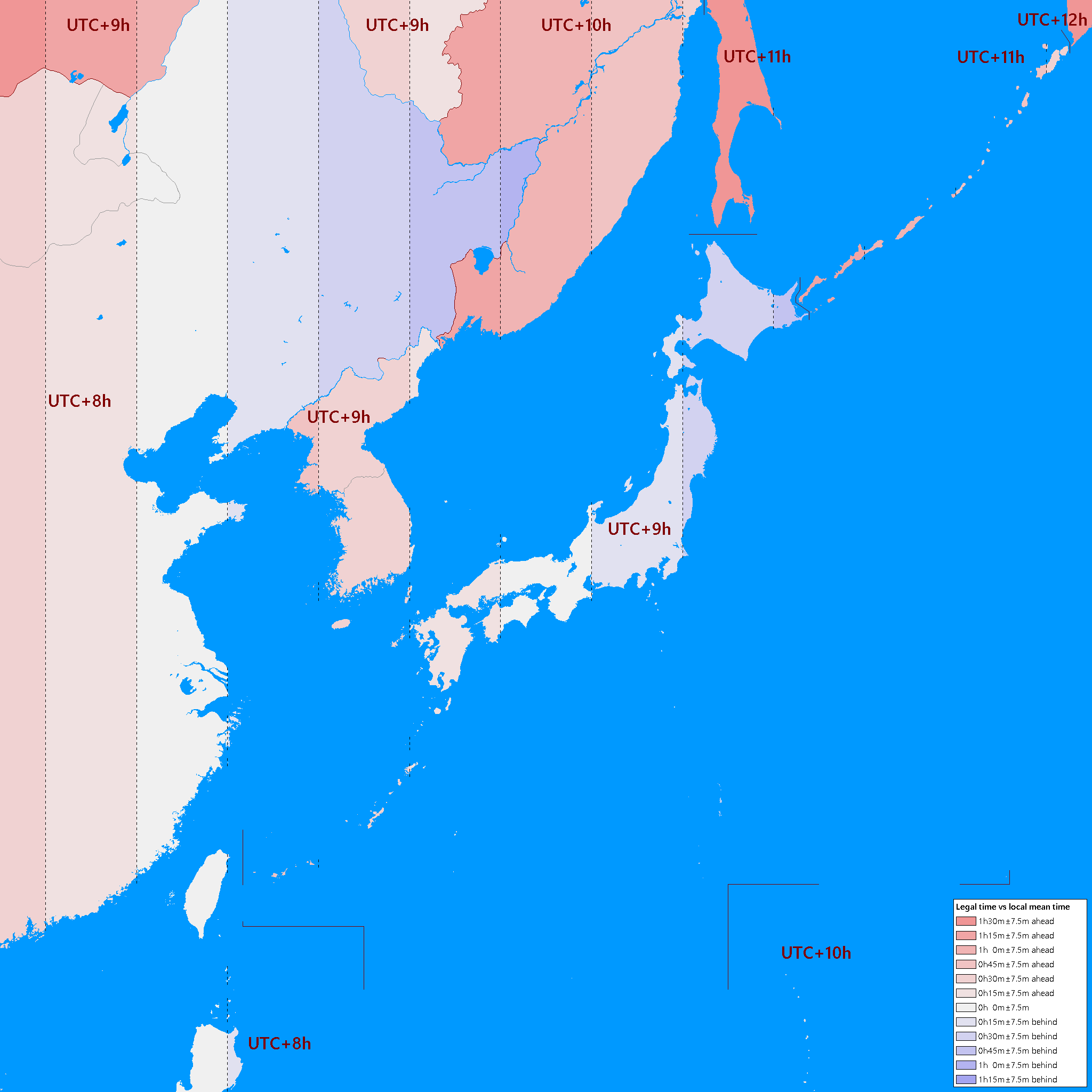
This map shows the difference between legal time and local mean time in Japan and its neighborhood. Eastern part of Hokkaido is over 30 minutes behind and western part of Ryukyu islands is over 30 minutes ahead of local solar time as a single standard time offset of UTC+09:00 is observed in whole country of Japan, even in its easternmost territory, Minamitorishima (153°59′E) and its westernmost territory, Yonaguni (122°56′E).

=== Areas in UTC+09:00 longitudes using other time zones ===
This concerns areas within 127°30′ E and 142°30′ E longitude.

==== China ====
- Parts of Northeast China, including eastern half of Heilongjiang Province and Yanbian Korean Autonomous Prefecture in Jilin Province, where UTC+08:00 is used.

==== Australia ====
- The easternmost parts of Western Australia where UTC+08:00 is used, Eucla and nearby areas where (unofficial) UTC+08:45 is used.
- The Northern Territory, where UTC+09:30 is used, and South Australia and Broken Hill where UTC+09:30 and DST UTC+10:30 are used, respectively, despite the borders of the territory and state fitting perfectly within the ideal meridians of UTC+09:00.
- The western parts of Queensland where UTC+10:00 is used, and westernmost parts of Victoria and New South Wales where UTC+10:00 and UTC+11:00 in summer time, is used.

==== Federated States of Micronesia ====
- Parts of Federated States of Micronesia, including western parts of Yap State, where UTC+10:00 is used.

==== Papua New Guinea ====
- The very westernmost parts of Papua New Guinea, where UTC+10:00 is used.

==== Russia ====
- Parts of Russia, including Jewish Autonomous Oblast, Primorsky Krai, central part of Sakha, and most of Khabarovsk Krai where UTC+10:00 is used, and westernmost parts of eastern Sakha Republic and Sakhalin Island, where UTC+11:00 is used.

=== Areas outside UTC+09:00 longitudes using UTC+09:00 time ===
==== Areas between 97°30′ E and 112°30′ E ("physical" UTC+07:00) ====
- Russia
  - A westernmost part of Sakha Republic, including the urban localities Aykhal and Udachny

==== Areas between 112°30′ E and 127°30′ E ("physical" UTC+08:00) ====
- Russia
  - Zabaykalsky Krai
  - Most of western Sakha Republic
- East Timor
- Indonesia
  - The western islands in the provinces of Maluku and North Maluku (from south to north):
    - Liran Island
    - Wetar Island
    - Kisar Island
    - Ambelau Island
    - Buru Island
    - Sanana Island
    - Mangole Island
    - Taliabu and surrounding islands
- Japan
  - Parts of Okinawa Prefecture:
    - Sakishima Islands
      - Yaeyama Islands
      - Miyako Islands
    - Okinawa Islands
      - Kume Island
      - Aguni Islands
      - The western parts of Kerama Islands
- North Korea
  - The western parts of Korea, including the capital city, Pyongyang
- South Korea
  - The western parts of Korea, including the capital city, Seoul
- Australia
  - Arubiddy Station

==== Areas between 142°30′ E and 157°30′ E ("physical" UTC+10:00) ====
- Japan
  - The eastern parts of Hokkaido, including Obihiro, Kushiro, and Nemuro
  - Minami-Tori-shima in Ogasawara municipality
- Russia
  - New Siberian Islands
    - Novaya Sibir
    - Faddeyevsky Island
    - A smaller part of Kotelny Island
    - The eastern part of Great Lyakhovsky Island

== See also ==
- Time in Japan
- Time in Russia
- Time in North Korea
- Time in South Korea
- Time in Indonesia
