= Malakatyn-Tas =

Mountain on Kotelny Island, Russia

- Малакатын-Тас
- Location within Sakha Republic

Highest point
- Elevation: 374 m (1,227 ft)
- Prominence: 374 m (1,227 ft)
- Listing: Mountains and hills of Russia
- Coordinates: 74°52′01.31″N 138°46′32.73″E

Geography
- Country: Russia
- Island: Kotelny, New Siberian Islands

Mount Malakatyn-Tas is a mountain on Kotelny Island, part of the New Siberian Islands north of the East Siberian Plain, Russia.

The area of the mountain is part of the Lena Delta Wildlife Reserve.

== Geography ==
At 374 metres (1,227 ft) tall, it is the highest point of the Anzhu group, as well as the New Siberian Islands.
