= Yakov Sannikov =

Russian explorer

Yakov Sannikov (fl. 1800) was a Russian promyshlennik and explorer of the New Siberian Islands.

In 1800, Sannikov discovered and charted Stolbovoy Island, and in 1805 Faddeyevsky Island. In 1809–1810, he took part in the expedition led by Matvei Gedenschtrom. In 1810, Sannikov crossed the island of New Siberia and a year later explored Faddeyevsky Island. He also discovered Bunge Land, and suggested that there was a vast land north of the Kotelny Island. This hypothetical island has become known as Sannikov Land.

A strait between Maly Lyakhovsky and the Kotelny islands bears Sannikov's name.
