= Alexander von Bunge (physician) =

Baltic German-Russian physician, zoologist and Arctic explorer

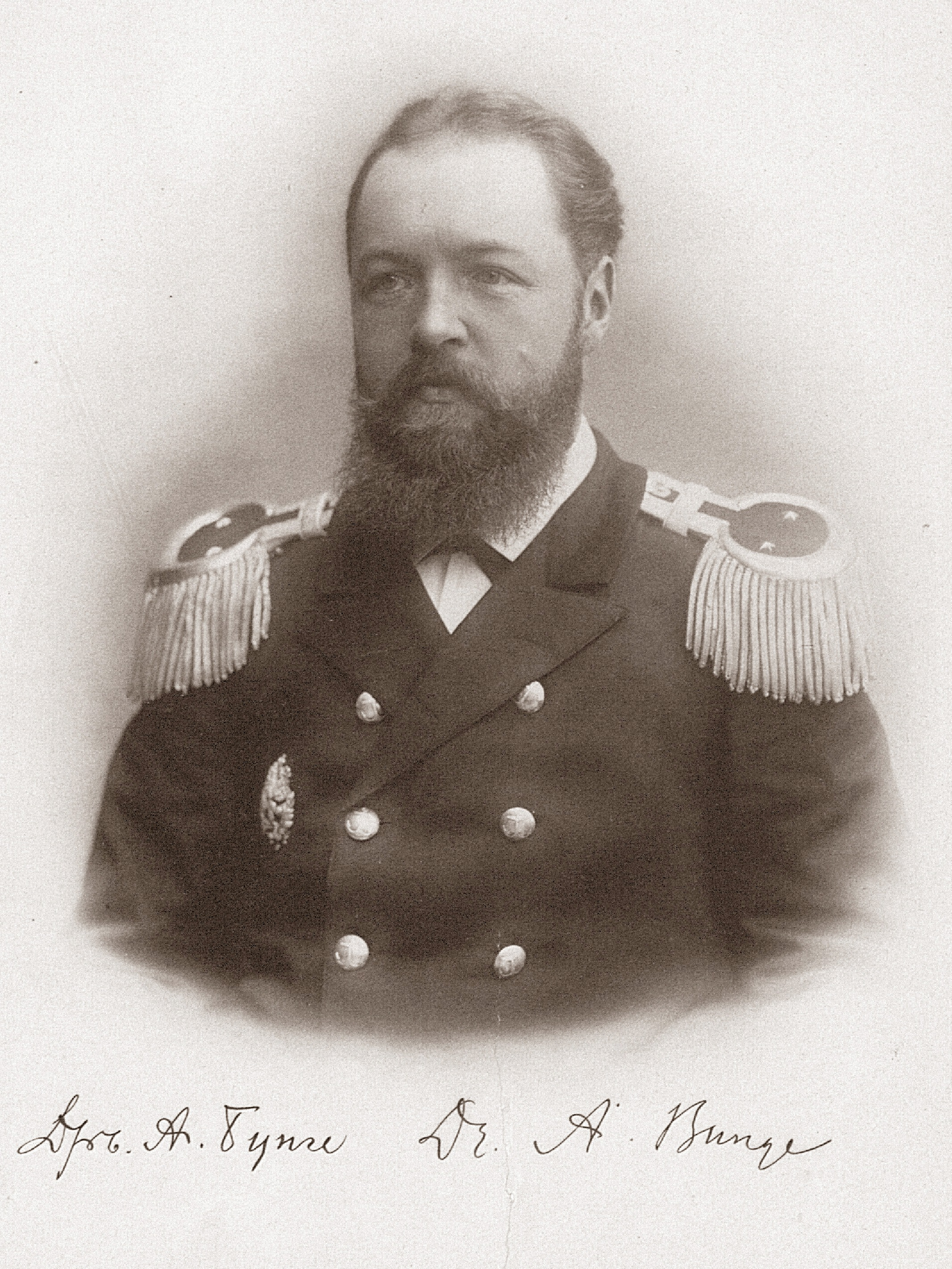
Alexander von Bunge in 1885. Below him was his Russian signature on the left, and German on the right.

Alexander von Bunge (Russian: Александр Александрович Бунге 9 November 1851, in Dorpat – 19 January 1930, in Tallinn) was a Baltic German physician, zoologist and Arctic explorer in the employ of the Russian Empire. He was the son of botanist Alexander Georg von Bunge (1803–1890).

== Biography ==
From 1870 to 1878, he was a student at the Imperial University of Dorpat, where in 1874–75, he also worked as an assistant in the institute of anatomy. In 1880 he earned his medical doctorate, relocating to St. Petersburg during the following year. Here, he enlisted with the Russian Geographical Society on a meteorological expedition to the Lena River delta (1882–1884).

In 1885–86, with geologist Eduard von Toll (1858–1902), he participated on a scientific journey to the Verkhoyansk region and the New Siberian Islands. On the expedition, they found the remains of mammoths and the fossils of other large mammals, and in the process, demonstrated that the New Siberian Islands had a relatively warm climate during the Late Pleistocene. Eduard von Toll gave the name "Bunge Land" for the low sandy shoal region joining Kotelny Island to Faddeyevsky Peninsula (formerly believed to be separate islands).

Beginning in 1886, he worked as a physician on various Russian frigates, later participating in the Russo-Japanese War as head physician of the Russian Pacific Ocean squadron and marine hospitals in Port Arthur. In 1905 he embarked on an expedition to the mouth of the Yenisey River by way of the Northeast Passage. From 1906 to 1914, he was head physician in the Russian Baltic Sea navy. and during World War I was director of several military hospitals in St. Petersburg. In 1918 he relocated to Estonia, taking up residence at Mõtliku, a farmstead he inherited from his father. In 1924 moved to Tallinn, where he died six years later on January 19, 1930.
