= Ivan Lyakhov =

Russian merchant

Ivan Lyakhov (Russian: Иван Ляхов), died around 1800, was a Russian merchant who explored large sections of the New Siberian Islands in the 18th century.

== Expedition ==
Lyakhov began his explorations in the spring of 1770 on dogsleds in order to explore the islands off the northern Siberian coast reported by Yakov Permyakov and Merkury Vagin in 1710. In this journey he visited the southern section of the New Siberian Islands. Lyakhov's intentions were mainly commercial, for he hoped to find mammoth ivory. His theory was that both the islands he explored, and which were later named after him Lyakhov Islands, and those he sighted in the distance but was not able to explore, were mainly formed by a substratum of bones and tusks of mammoths.

Lyakhov went on another exploratory venture to the New Siberian Islands in 1773–1774. He visited again the Lyakhov Islands, crossed the Sannikov Strait and discovered Kotelny Island.

Lyakhov undertook his last expedition in 1775. This time there was a scientific background to his explorations, for he brought with him a land surveyor. During this journey Great Lyakhovsky Island (Большой Ляховский) was thoroughly surveyed and described.
