= Białkowski =

Białkowski (Polish pronunciation: [bjawˈkɔfski]; feminine: Białkowska; plural: Białkowscy) is a Polish surname. Its Russified form is Belkovsky/Belkovski.

The surname may refer to:

- Bartosz Białkowski (born 1987), Polish footballer
- Dariusz Białkowski (born 1970), Polish sprint canoeist
- Eliza Białkowska (born 1973), Polish rhythmic gymnast
- Aneta Michalak-Białkowska (born 1977), Polish sprint canoeist
