= Maly Lyakhovsky Island =

Island in Lyakhovsky Islands, Russia

Coordinates: 74°00′N 140°30′E

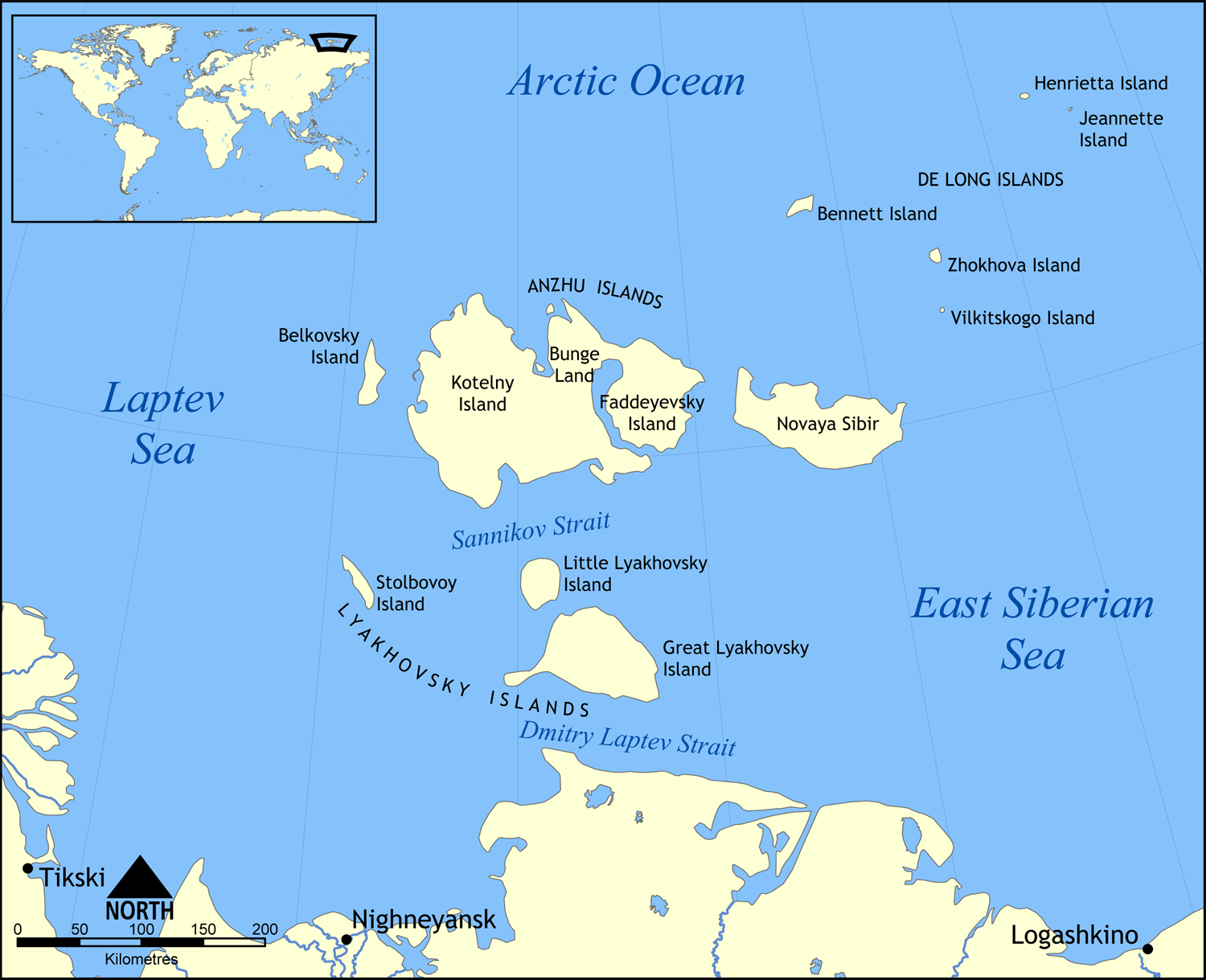
Map showing the location of Lyakhovsky Islands

Maly Lyakhovsky Island (Russian: Малый Ляховский) is the second largest of the Lyakhovsky Islands belonging to the New Siberian Islands archipelago in Laptev Sea in northern Russia. It has an area of 975.5 km^{2} (376.6 sq mi).

The Lyakhovsky Islands are named in honour of Ivan Lyakhov, who, along with Zaitai Protodyakonov, first arrived on the Maly Lyakhovsky Island in April 1770. In 1773, accompanied by several other people, he and Protodyakonov came back to the island in a five-oared boat just as they were going up north to where the Kotelny Island was. The island has been visited several times ever since, such as in May 1893 by Baron Toll and Lieutenant Shileiko.

== Geology ==
Maly Lyakhovsky Island consists of Upper Jurassic to lower Cretaceous turbidites, also known as flysch, covered by a thin veneer of Pliocene to Pleistocene sediments. These Mesozoic rocks consist of sandstones, argillites, and shales deformed into east-northeast striking folds about 7 to 20 km (4.3 to 12.4 mi) wide. The Mesozoic rocks are covered by a relatively thin layer of Pliocene to Pleistocene sandy and clayey sediments of colluvial and alluvial origin. Near the coast, the alluvial sediments grade into nearshore marine sediments containing fossil marine mollusks and lignitized wood. Thick permafrost characterized by massive ice wedges has developed in these sediments.

On 29 May 2013, an expedition of North-Eastern Federal University (NEFU) found the remains of a 10,000-year-old carcass of a female mammoth on Maliy Lyakhovsky Island. It was reported that liquid blood was found in ice cavities below the belly even though the temperature at the time of excavation was −7 to −10 °C (19 to 14 °F). It was speculated that this find might reveal information about the cryoprotective properties of mammoth blood. The mammoth remains were taken to Yakutsk in Sakha Republic, Russia, for bacterial examination and tissues analysis, especially for a joint project of NEFU and Sooam Biotech Research Foundation in cloning a mammoth.

== Vegetation ==
Rush/grass, forb, cryptogam tundra covers Maly Lyakhovsky Island. It is tundra consisting mostly of very low-growing grasses, rushes, forbs, mosses, lichens, and liverworts. These plants either mostly or completely cover the surface of the ground. The soils are typically moist, fine-grained, and often hummocky.

== See also ==
- List of mammoths
