= Lyakhovsky Islands =

Islands in Russia

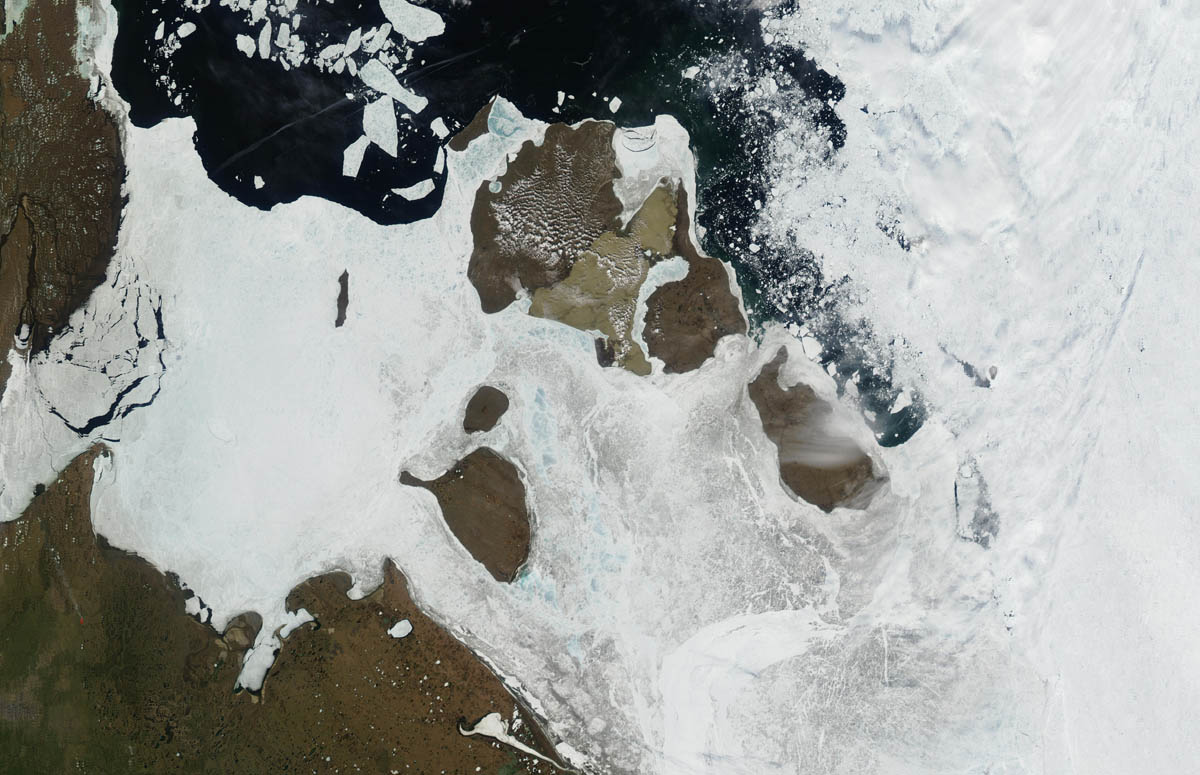
- Aqua MODIS satellite image of the Lyakhovsky Islands

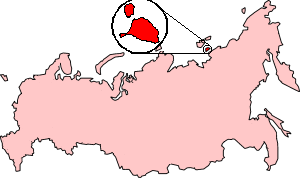

Geography
- Location: Laptev Sea
- Coordinates: 74°39′36″N 141°59′14″E
- Archipelago: Lyakhovsky Islands
- Total islands: 6

Administration
- Russia
- Federal subject: Sakha Republic

Demographics
- Population: uninhabited

The Lyakhovsky Islands (Russian: Ляховские острова, romanized: Lyakhovskiye ostrova; Yakut: Ляхов арыылара) are the southernmost group of the New Siberian Islands in the Arctic seas of eastern Russia. The islands are named in honour of Ivan Lyakhov, who explored them in 1773.

== Geography ==
They are separated from the mainland by the Laptev Strait (60 km [37 mi] wide), and from the Anzhu Islands group by the Sannikov Strait (50 km [31 mi] wide). Two islands dominate the group:

- Bolshoy Lyakhovsky Island (Great Lyakhovsky Island) 5,156.6 km^{2} (1,991.0 sq mi) with a maximum altitude of 311 m (1,020 ft) on Emy Tas
- Maly Lyakhovsky Island (Little Lyakhovsky Island) 975.5 km^{2} (376.6 sq mi)
- Stolbovoy is a large island detached from the group.
- Yaya Island
- Off Great Lyakhovsky Island's southwestern cape lies a small islet called Ostrov Khopto-Terer.
- Semyonovsky Island has now disappeared after heavy erosion. Before its disappearance, it was at four square kilometres (1.5 sq mi), one of the smallest islands in the archipelago.

== In popular culture ==
Part of the action of two novels by Jules Verne, Waif of the Cynthia (1885) and César Cascabel (1890), takes place there. In the latter, the term "Liakhov Islands" refers to the New Siberian group as a whole, as the principal action is on Kotelny Island.
