= Belkovsky Island =

Belkovsky: Бельковский Oстров (Russian); Бельков Aрыыта (Yakut)
- Island
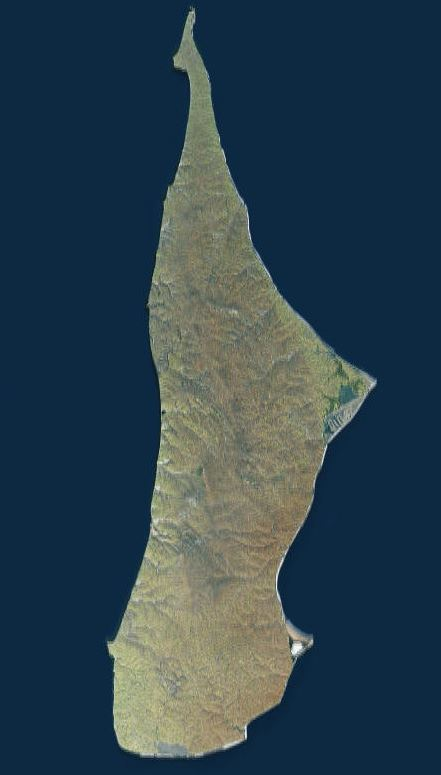
- Landsat view of Belkovsky Island in the Anzhu subgroup.

- Location within Sakha Republic
- Coordinates: 75°33′10″N 135°50′30″E
- Country: Russian Federation
- Federal subject: Far Eastern Federal District
- Republic: Yakutia

Belkovsky Island (Russian: Бельковский Oстров; Yakut: Бельков Aрыыта, romanized: Bel'kov Arııta) is the westernmost island of the Anzhu Islands subgroup of the New Siberian Islands archipelago in the Laptev Sea.

== Location ==
The strait between Belkovsky Island and neighboring Kotelny Island is known as the Zarya Strait, after Eduard Toll's Zarya (polar ship). Ostrov Strizhëva is a small islet located right off Belkovsky's southern shore.

Belkovsky Island is approximately 500 square kilometres (190 sq mi) in area. The highest point of the island is 120 metres (390 ft).

Administratively, Belkovsky Island is a part of Yakutia, Russian Federation.

== Geology ==
Belkovsky Island consist of tightly folded Upper Devonian and Lower Carboniferous strata. The Upper Devonian rocks are clayey marine carbonates interbedded with limestone, sandstone, and conglomerate. The Lower Carboniferous rocks are composed of siltstone, argillite, and sandstone interbedded with breccia, limestone, and infrequent rhyolitic lavas.

== Fauna and Flora ==
There are big bird colonies and a walrus rookery on the island.

Rush/grass, forb, cryptogam tundra covers the Belkovsky Island. It is tundra consisting mostly of very low-growing grasses, rushes, forbs, mosses, lichens, and liverworts. These plants either mostly or completely cover the surface of the ground. The soils are typically moist, fine-grained, and often hummocky.

== History ==
The island was discovered in 1808 by a Russian merchant named Belkov.

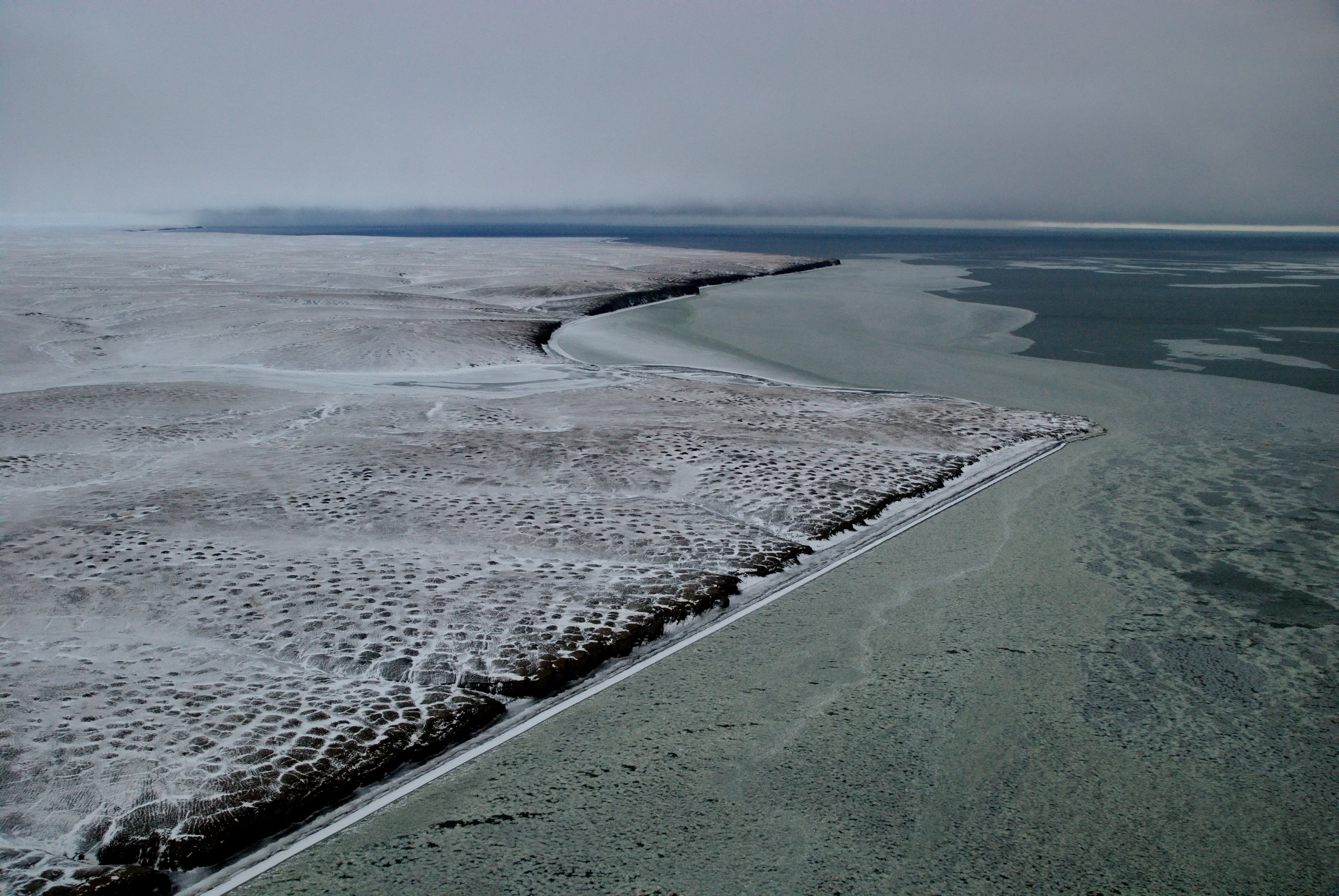
Coast of Belkovsky Island

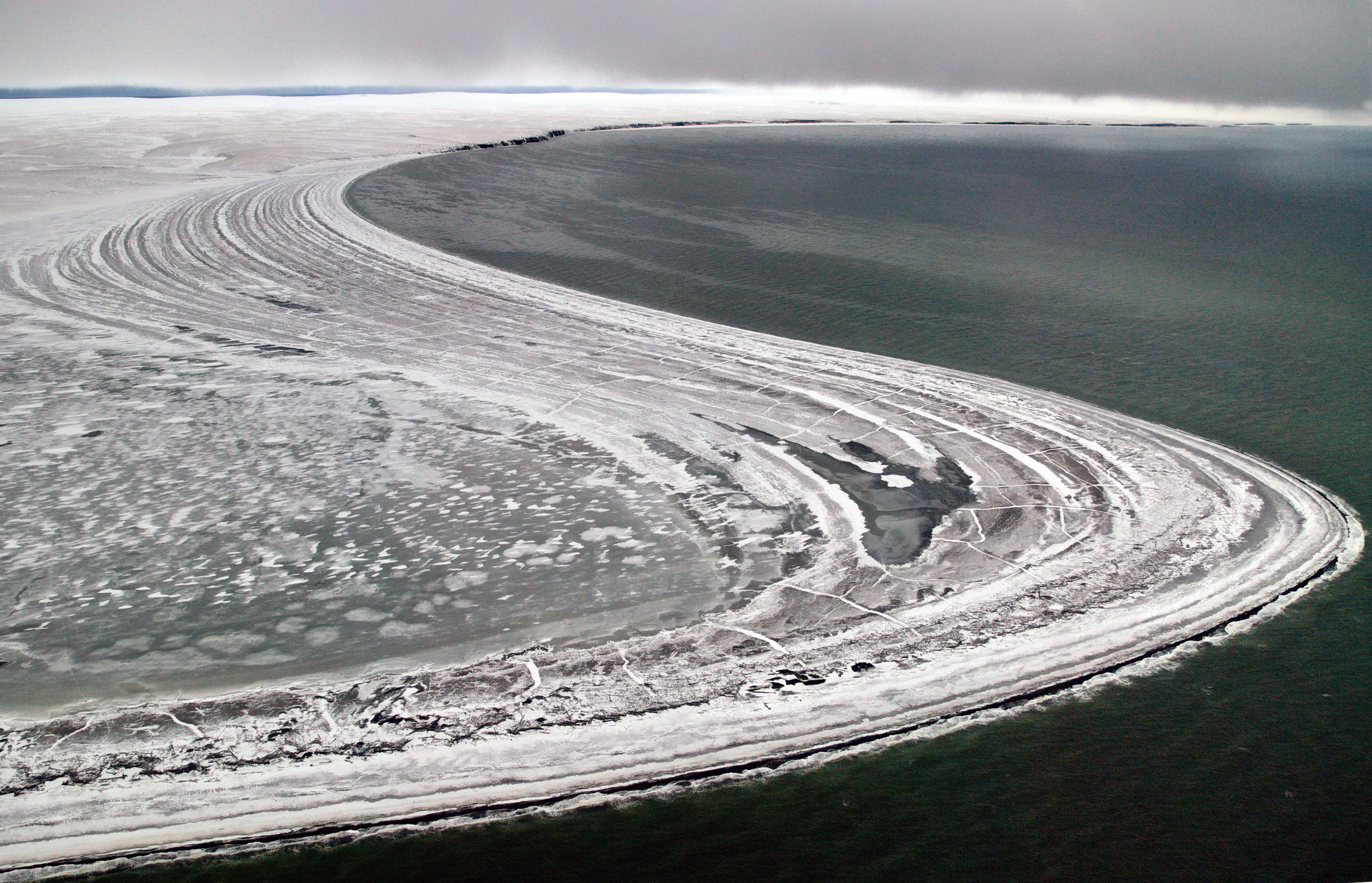
Coast of Belkovsky Island

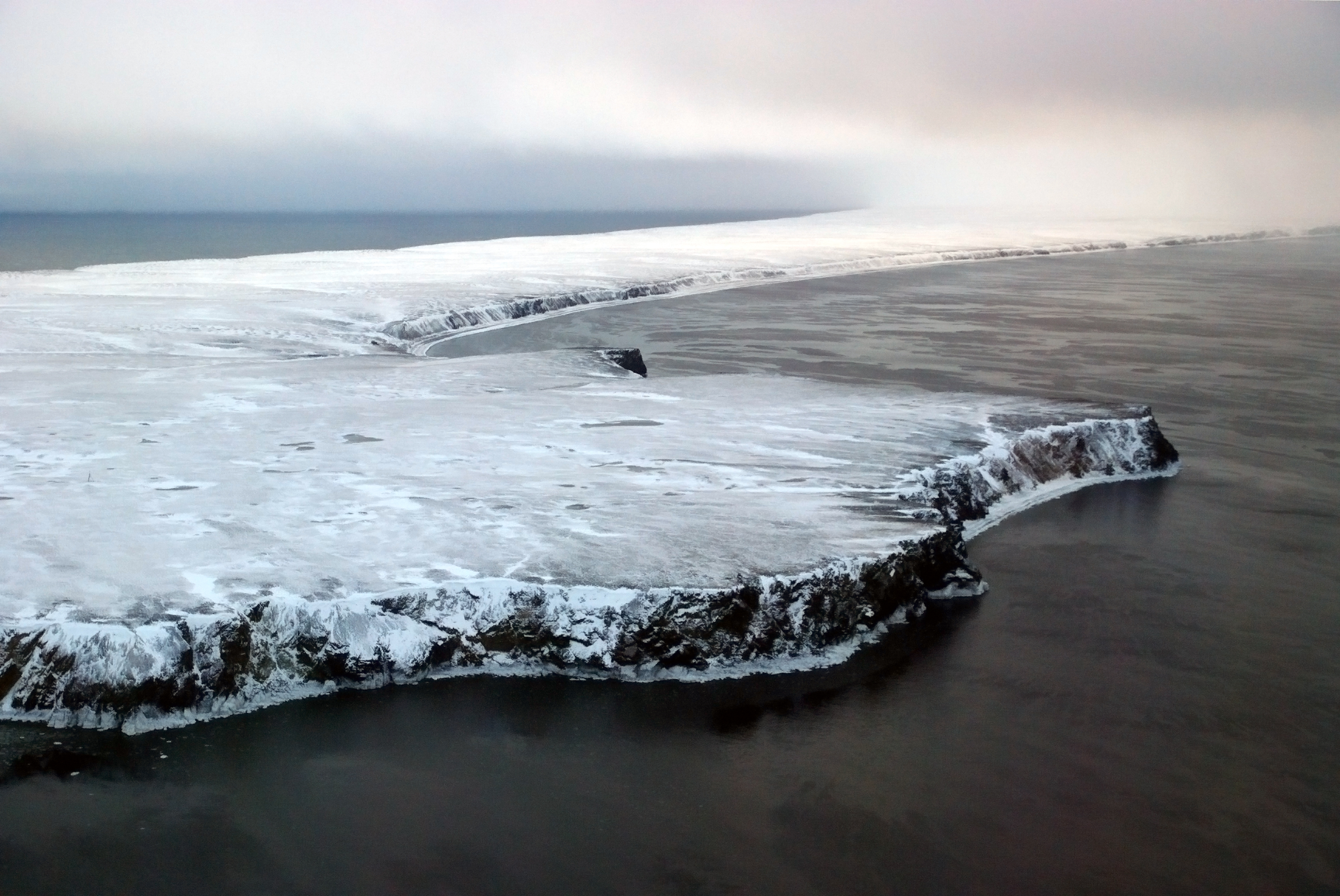
Coast of Belkovsky Island

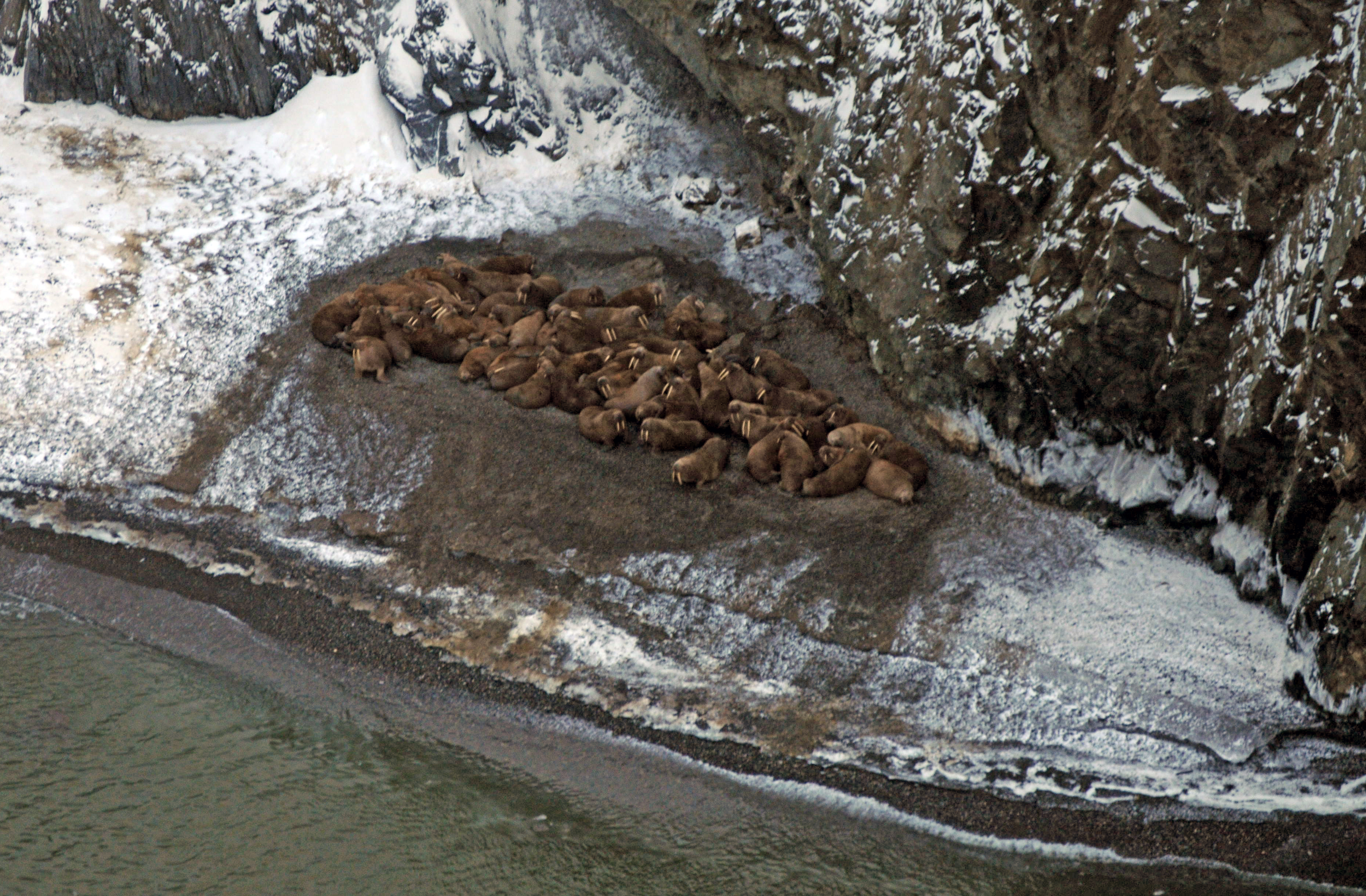
Walrus haul out site at the Cape Severny, Belkovsky Island
