= Sannikov Land =

Phantom island in the Arctic Ocean

Coordinates: 80°N 140°E

Sannikov Land Земля Санникова
- Reported location of Sannikov Land
- Created by: First reported by Yakov Sannikov and Matvei Gedenschtrom

In-universe information
- Type: Large phantom island
- Locations: Arctic Ocean

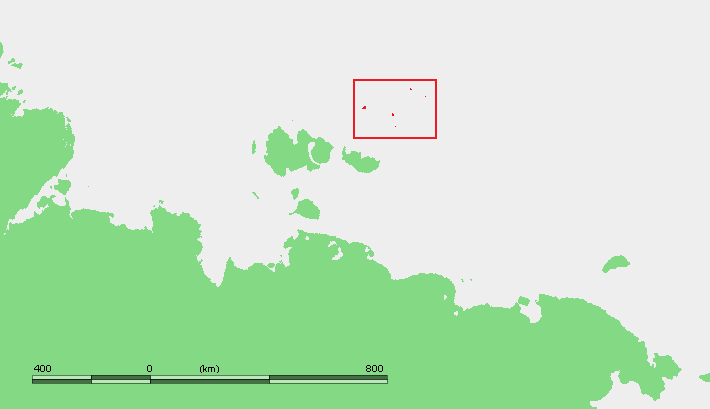
Location of the De Long Islands, beyond which Sannikov land was deemed to be.

Sannikov Land (Russian: Земля Санникова, Zemlya Sannikova) was a phantom island in the Arctic Ocean. Its supposed existence became something of a myth in 19th-century Russia.

== History ==
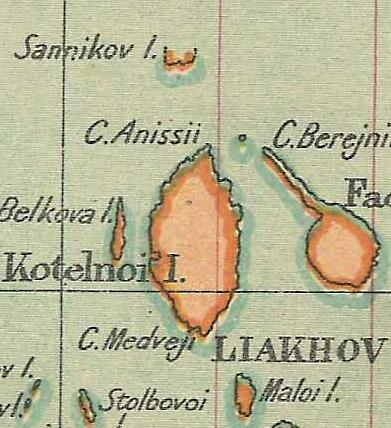
Sannikov Land on Stanford's General Map of The World, 1922

Yakov Sannikov and Matvei Gedenschtrom claimed to have seen the land mass during their 1809–1810 cartographic expedition to the New Siberian Islands. Sannikov was the first one to report the sighting of a "new land" north of Kotelny Island in 1811 (hence the name Sannikov Land).

In 1886, the Baltic German explorer in Russian service Baron Eduard von Toll reported observing the elusive land during an expedition to the New Siberian Islands. In August 1901, during the Russian Polar Expedition, also led by Toll, the Russian Arctic ship Zarya headed across the Laptev Sea, searching for the legendary Sannikov Land. It was soon blocked by floating pack ice in the New Siberian Islands. Attempts to reach Sannikov Land, deemed to be beyond the De Long Islands, continued in 1902 while the Zarya was trapped in fast ice. In November, Toll and three companions left the Zarya and travelled south on loose ice floes, away from Bennett Island, and vanished forever.

A search by the Soviet icebreaker Sadko was announced in 1936 and carried out in 1937 but found no trace of the land.

Some historians and geographers, judging from other successes of Sannikov and the presence of shallow sand shoals at Sannikov Land's mapped location, postulate that it indeed once existed, but was destroyed by coastal erosion and became a submerged sand shoal, like many other islands formed either of fossilized ice or of permafrost. This process of Arctic islands disappearing continues within the New Siberian Islands archipelago. Other historians and geographers hypothesize that Sannikov Land might have been a miraged image of Bennett Island. Such mirages occur frequently in the Arctic region.

== In popular culture ==
Map of Sannikov Land by Vyacheslav Chernikov, the flyleaf of the 1926 novel

Russian geologist and science fiction writer Vladimir Obruchev fictionalized this phantom island in his novel Sannikov Land (1926). In the story, the island provided the last escape for a tribe of Onkilons, pushed away from the mainland by other Siberian peoples. The Onkilons are a hypothetical extinct people known from the legends of Chukchi people. Some researchers hypothesized that Onkilongs could have been a tribe of Yuits. In the novel, the Onkilons were discovered by a small expedition looking for the island, and who were eventually stranded on it. Obruchev's justification of the novel's events was that the island turned out to contain a caldera of a volcano, which made the island warm and inhabitable. It also hosted a tribe of Neanderthals (called "Vampoo") and mammoths. At the end of the story, the volcano erupts and destroys the island.

In 1973, a science fiction film based on Obruchev's book, called The Land of Sannikov, was released in the Soviet Union.

Sannikov Land is used as a location in British horror podcast The Magnus Archives in Episode 101, "Another Twist". It is described as a place that does not exist and has never existed, in association with an entity known as "The Spiral," which personifies madness and deceit.

== See also ==
- Crocker Land
- Bradley Land
