= Belkovsky =

Belkovsky (Russian: Белковский) may refer to:

- Stanislav Belkovsky, Russian political analyst
- Belkovsky Island, Russia
- Belkovsky Rural Administrative Okrug of Pochepsky District, Bryansk Oblast, Russia
