= Anzhu Islands =

Anzhu Islands: Oстрова Анжу (Russian); Анжу арыыларa (Yakut)
- Island group
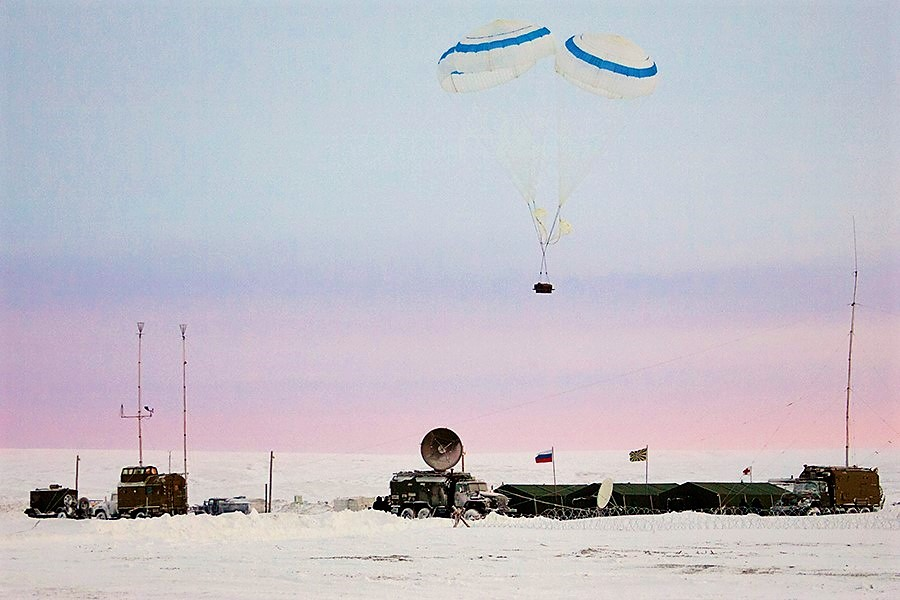
- Temp aerodrome

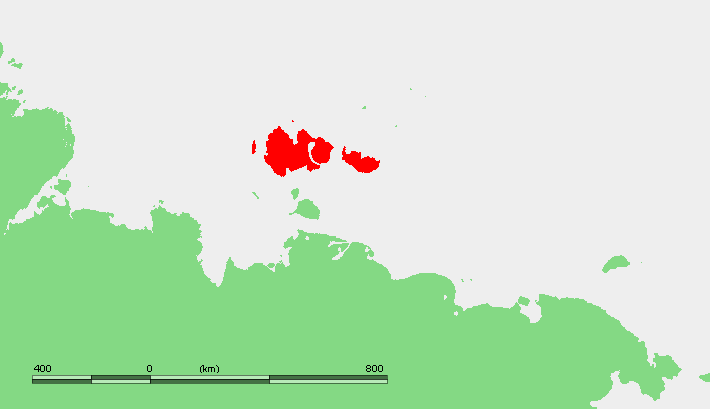

- Location within Sakha Republic Location within Russia
- Coordinates: 75°28′30″N 143°2′30″E
- Country: Russia
- Federal subject: Far Eastern Federal District
- Republic: Yakutia

Government
- Website: government.ru/en/

The Anzhu Islands or Anjou Islands (Russian: Oстрова Анжу, romanized: Ostrova Anzhu; Yakut: Анжу арыыларa, romanized: Anju arıılara) are an archipelago and geographical subgroup of the New Siberian Islands archipelago. They are located between the Laptev Sea and the East Siberian Sea in the Arctic Ocean, being separated from the Lyakhovsky Islands by the Sannikov Strait.

== Etymology ==
The Anzhu Islands are named after explorer Pyotr Anjou, a Russian-born explorer of French Huguenot descent.

== Geography ==
The total area of the islands is approx. 29,000 square kilometres (11,000 sq mi).

This island group is a practically uninhabited territory. It belongs administratively to Yakutia, Russian Federation.

=== Main islands ===
The main islands of the Anzhu Islands archipelago are, from west to east:

- Belkovsky Island
- Kotelny Island
  - Bunge Land
  - Faddeyevsky Peninsula
- New Siberia
