= Bunge Land =

Shoal

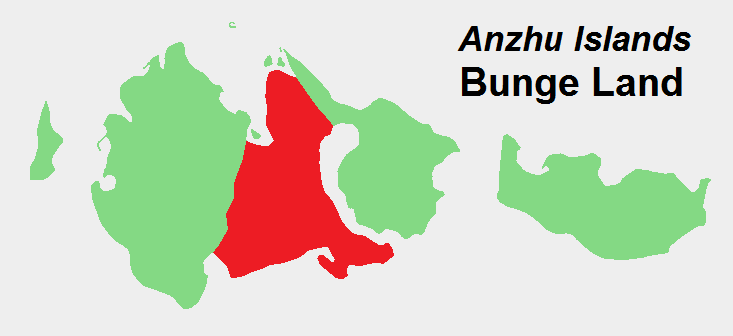
- Location of Bunge Land in the Anzhu subgroup.

- Location within Sakha Republic
- Etymology: Alexander Alexandrovich Bunge

Geography
- Location: East Siberian Sea
- Coordinates: 75°25′07″N 141°00′49″E
- Archipelago: New Siberian Islands
- Area: 6,200 km^{2} (2,400 sq mi)
- Highest elevation: 8 m (26 ft)

Administration
- Russia
- Republic: Yakutia

Demographics
- Population: 0
- Ethnic groups: None

Bunge Land or Zemlya Bunge is a vast, desolate and almost entirely barren intermediate zone in the Anzhu Islands off the northern coast of Siberia. It is located between Kotelny and Faddeyevsky, which, unlike Bunge Land, could be described as proper islands. Sandy and flat, it spans approximately 6,200 square kilometres (2,400 sq mi) in area with little to no elevation changes.

Since most of its surface rises only to a maximum height of 8 metres (26 ft) above sea level, Bunge Land is flooded during storm surges, except for a very small area in the southeast that rises to an elevation of 11 to 21 metres (36 to 69 ft) above sea level. The area that is periodically submerged accounts for over 80% of the total surface and is practically devoid of vegetation.

Bunge Land is named after Russian zoologist and explorer Alexander Alexandrovich Bunge.
