= Faddeyevsky Peninsula =

Peninsula in Russia

Остров Фаддеевский
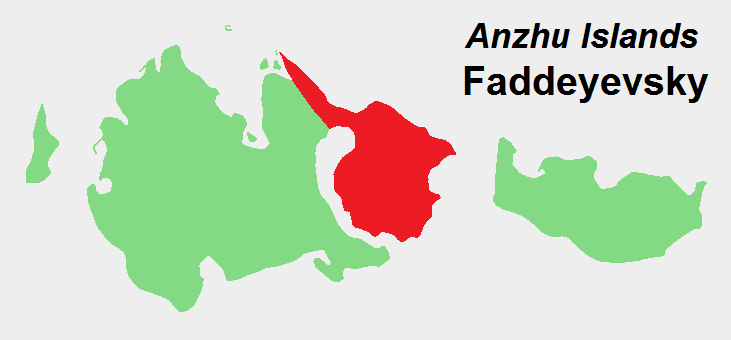
- Location of the Faddeyevsky Peninsula in the Anzhu subgroup.

- Location within Sakha Republic

Geography
- Location: New Siberian Islands
- Coordinates: 75°27′N 143°51′E
- Adjacent to: Arctic Ocean; East Siberian Sea
- Area: 5,300 km^{2} (2,000 sq mi)
- Length: 85 km (52.8 mi)
- Width: 60 km (37 mi)
- Highest elevation: 65 m (213 ft)

Administration
- Russia
- Federal subject: Sakha Republic

Demographics
- Population: Uninhabited

Faddeyevsky, also known as Faddeyevsky Island (Russian: остров Фаддеевский), is a large peninsula in the New Siberian Islands, Sakha Republic, Russia.

This geographic feature was named after a fur trader called Faddeyev who built the first settlement there.

== Geography ==
It was formerly recognized as an island, but it is geographically part of Kotelny Island. The peninsula projects from the northern end of Bunge Land eastwards with its isthmus in the north. There is a deep inlet on Faddeyevski between its western coast and adjoining Bunge Land.

Faddeyevsky is covered with tundra vegetation and dotted with small lakes.

Unlike neighboring Kotelny this peninsula is relatively flat despite its size, its highest point being only 65 metres (213 ft). Its area is 5,300 square kilometres (2,000 sq mi).

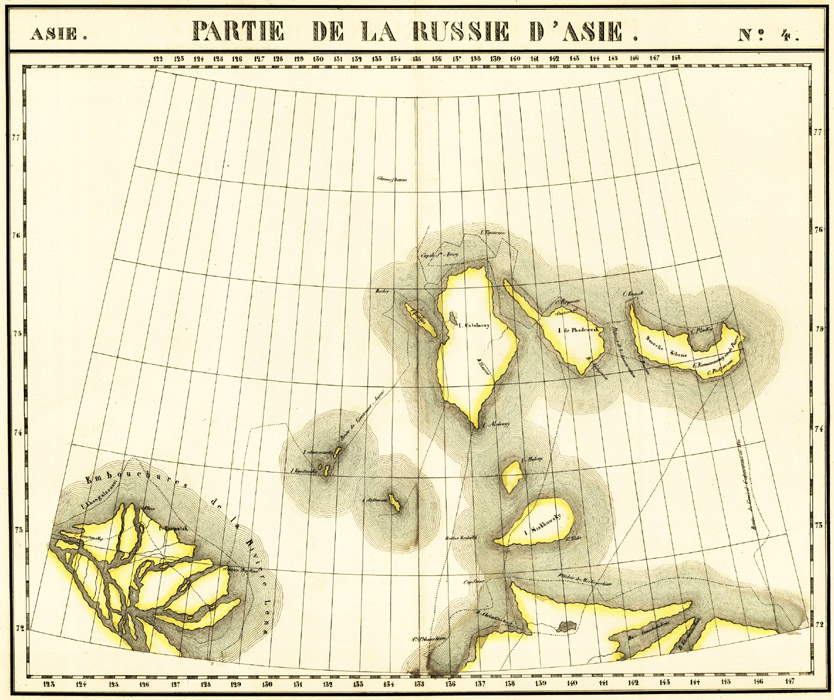
Map of the New Siberian Islands ca. 1820.

Faddeyevsky Landsat-1 satellite image.

== See also ==
- Anzhu Islands
