= Sannikov Strait =

Strait in Russia

Coordinates: 74.5°N 140°E

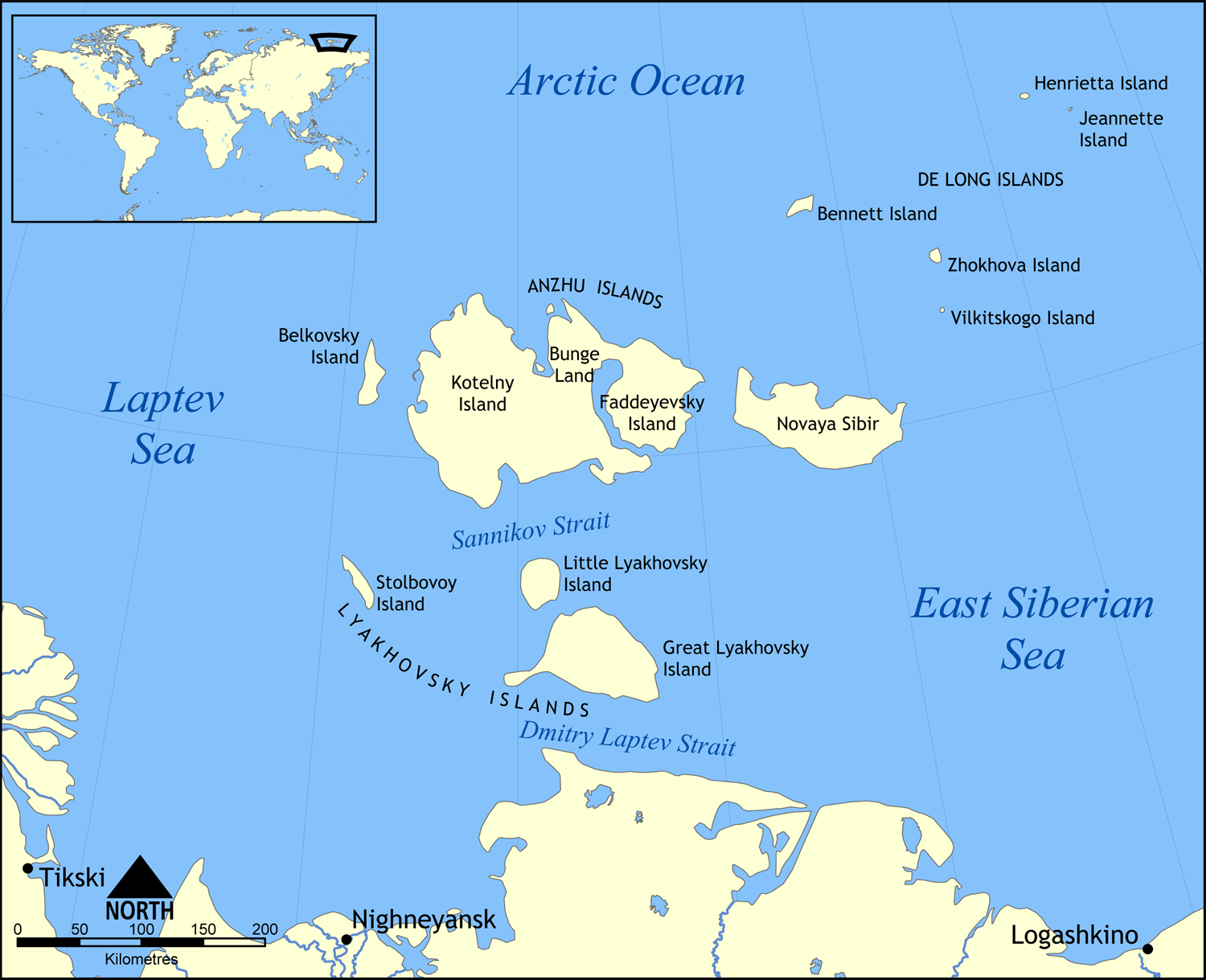
Map showing the location of Sannikov Strait

Sannikov Strait (пролив Санникова; proliv Sannikova) is a 50 km-wide strait in Russia. It separates Anzhu Islands from Lyakhovsky Islands, and connects the Laptev Sea in the west with the East Siberian Sea in the east. It is named after Russian explorer Yakov Sannikov.
