= Kotelny Island =

Island in Russian Arctic

Kotelny
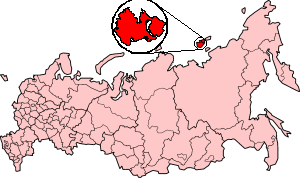
- Location of Kotelny Island in the Russian Federation

- Location within Sakha Republic

Geography
- Location: East Siberian Sea
- Coordinates: 75°20′N 141°00′E
- Archipelago: New Siberian Islands
- Total islands: 7
- Major islands: 3
- Area: 23,165 km^{2} (8,944 sq mi)
- Highest elevation: 361 m (1184 ft)
- Highest point: Malakatyn-Tas

Administration
- Russia
- Republic: Yakutia

Demographics
- Population: 250 (2017)
- Pop. density: 0.000086/km^{2} (0.000223/sq mi)
- Ethnic groups: None

Kotelny Island (Russian: Остров Котельный, romanized: Ostrov Kotelny; Yakut: Олгуйдаах Aрыы, romanized: Olguydaax Arııta) is part of the Anzhu Islands subgroup of the New Siberian Islands located between the Laptev Sea and the East Siberian Sea in the Russian Arctic. It is administratively and municipally part of Bulunsky District of the Republic of Sakha (Yakutia).

Kotelny, Faddeyevsky and Bunge Land are usually named as separate islands on most 20th century maps, although sometimes on the newest maps the name "Kotelny" is applied to the whole island. A flat, low-lying, plain connecting both is known as Bunge Land (Russian: Земля Бунге).

The total area of Kotelny Island is 23,165 square kilometres (8,944 sq mi). Kotelny is one of the 50 largest islands in the world.

== History ==
The island was officially discovered by a Russian merchant and hunter, Ivan Lyakhov, with the merchant Protod’yakonov, in 1773. In 1770, Ivan Lyakhov noticed reindeer tracks heading seaward across the sea ice. In 1773, he and Protod’yakonov discovered the Lyakhovsky Islands by boat using the bearing of these tracks. Continuing from the Lyakhovsky Islands, they discovered Kotelny Island and named it "Kettle Island" after a copper kettle, which they found while exploring it. The person(s), who visited Kotelny Island and left the copper kettle, is unknown. Formerly this island had been known as "Thaddeus Island" or "Thaddeus Islands" on some maps.

Under the employment of Semen and Lev Syrovatskiy, Yakov Sannikov conducted numerous hunting and cartographic expeditions between 1800 and 1810. On one of these expeditions in 1805, he discovered Faddeyevsky Island. In 1809–1810 Yakov Sannikov and Matvei Gedenschtrom went to the New Siberian Islands on a cartographic expedition. Yakov Sannikov reported the sighting of a "new land" north of Kotelny in 1811. This became the myth of Zemlya Sannikova or "Sannikov Land".

In 1886 Baron Eduard Von Toll thought that he had seen an unknown land north of Kotelny. He guessed that this was the so-called "Zemlya Sannikova".

== Geography ==
The western part of Kotelny Island proper, also known as "Kettle Island", is the largest section of the group, with an area of 11,665 km^{2}. It is rocky and hilly, rising to 374 m on Mt. Malakatyn-Tas. The Chukochya River flows westwards to the Laptev Sea. Cape Anisy 76.200°N 139.1167°E is the northernmost headland of Kotelny and it is an important geographical point for it marks the NE limit of the Laptev Sea. Cape Medvezhiy is the southernmost headland of the island.

Bunge Land or Zemlya Bunge is a huge empty and almost barren intermediate zone. It is located between Kotelny and Faddeyevsky, which, unlike Bunge Land, could be described as proper islands. Sandy and flat, its area is 6,200 square kilometres (2,400 sq mi). Since it rises only to a maximum height of 8 metres (26 ft) above sea level, Bunge Land is flooded during storm surges, except for a very small area in the southeast that rises to an elevation of 11 to 21 metres (36 to 69 ft) above sea level. The area that is periodically submerged accounts for over 80% of the total surface and is practically devoid of vegetation. Bunge Land is named after Russian zoologist and explorer Alexander Alexandrovich Bunge.

Faddeyevsky Peninsula (полуостров Фаддеевский) is a large peninsula projecting from the northern end of Bunge Land eastwards with its isthmus in the north. There is a deep inlet on Faddeyevski between its western coast and adjoining Bunge Land. Unlike Kotelny this island is relatively flat despite its size, its highest point being only 65 metres (213 ft). Its area is 5,300 square kilometres (2,000 sq mi). Faddeyevsky is covered with tundra vegetation and dotted with small lakes. This island was named after a fur trader called Faddeyev who built the first habitation there.

Subdivisions of Kotelny Island
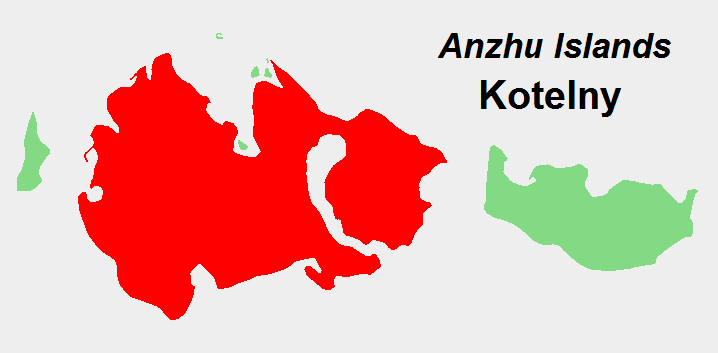
Location of Kotelny Island in the Anzhu subgroup.

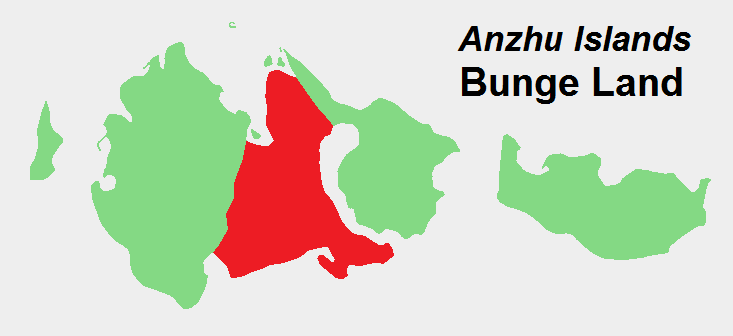
Location of Bunge Land in the Anzhu subgroup.

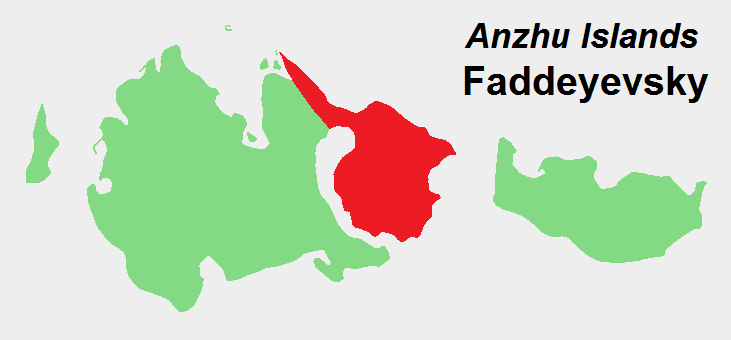
Location of the Faddeyevsky Peninsula in the Anzhu subgroup.

=== Adjacent islands ===
- Deep inside the bay on the northern side of Kotelny lies Skrytyy Island (Ostrov Skrytyy) 75.667°N 140.833°E. It is 11 kilometres (6.8 mi) long and 5.5 kilometres (3.4 mi) wide.
- Very close to Bunge Land's northwestern coast there are two islands: Zheleznyakov Island (Ostrov Zheleznyakova), right off the NW cape and, east of it, Matar Island (Ostrov Matar). Both islands are about five kilometres (3.1 mi) in length.
- Nanosnyy Island 76.283°N 140.416°E is a small island located due north off the northern bay formed by Kotelny and Bunge. It is C-shaped and only four kilometres (2.5 mi) in length, but its importance lies in the fact that it is the northernmost island of the New Siberian group.
- Figurina Island (Ostrov Figurina) was located about 30 km east of Nanosnyy Island. When discovered in 1822 by P. Anzhu, while he was searching for "Sannikov Land", its area was about 8 to 9 square kilometres (3.1 to 3.5 sq mi). At that time, it had sea cliffs as high as 20 metres (66 ft). Although marked on maps published in 1926, 1941, and 1945, a Soviet hydrographic expedition conducted in the early 1940s found that Figurina Island no longer existed.

== Geology ==
Kotelny Island consists of sedimentary rocks and sediments ranging in age from Early Paleozoic to Late Cenozoic. The oldest rocks are fossiliferous shallow- to deep-water marine, Ordovician to Early Devonian limestones and dolomites. Middle Devonian to Carboniferous interbedded limestones, dolomites, sandstones, and conglomerates overlie these sedimentary strata. The Permian to Jurassic strata exposed within Kotelny Island consist of interbedded, fossiliferous mudstones, siltstones, and sandstones. All of these sedimentary rocks are faulted, folded into complex anticlines and synclines, and intruded by thin diabase dikes. Pleistocene to Holocene fluvial sediments, which range in age from 1,500 to greater than 55,000 radiocarbon years BP, underlie stream terraces that lie within the Balyktakh and Dragotsennaya River valleys. Thick permafrost has developed in these sediments.

Within Bunge Land and the southwest corner of Kotelny Island, relatively unconsolidated sediments ranging in age from Early Cretaceous to Holocene overlie the above folded and faulted sedimentary rocks. The oldest of these sediments are Early Cretaceous alluvial clays, silts, and sands that contain layers of conglomerate, tuff, tuffaceous sandstone, coal, and, at top, rhyolite. The Late Cretaceous sediments are overlain by Late Eocene to Pliocene alluvial sands that contain layers of clay, silt, gravel, brown coal, and lignitized wood. The vast majority of Bunge Land is blanketed by Early Holocene marine sediments. Only in the central and southern parts of Bunge Land do either Late to Early Pleistocene marine sediments or very small patches of highly weathered Prequaternary deposits and bedrock underlie the surface.

The surface of Faddeyevsky Island is underlain by unconsolidated sediments ranging in age from Early Cretaceous to Pleistocene. Three very small and isolated exposures indicate that the Early Cretaceous strata are similar to those found in the southwest corner of Kotelny Island. Overlying the Early Cretaceous sediments are alluvial and lacustrine Eocene clays and silts that contains rare beds of sands, brown coal, and gravel. To the north these sediments grade laterally into nearshore marine clays with fossil pelecypods. The Eocene sediments are overlain by fossiliferous, terrestrial and marine Oligocene to Miocene sands that contain subordinate beds of mud, clay, gravel, and brown coal. The Oligocene-Miocene sands accumulated in alluvial, lacustrine, and nearshore marine environments. Overlying the Oligocene-Miocene sands are Pliocene alluvial, lacustrine, and nearshore marine, muds, silts, and sands.

Pleistocene deposits blanket most of the surface of Faddeyevsky Island. A layer of Late Pleistocene and Holocene alluvial and lacustrine deposits largely cover the central and southern parts of Faddeyevsky Island. Middle and Late Pleistocene deposits largely cover the northern part of this island. The permafrost is about 400 to 500 m thick. The central plain of Faddeyevsky Island has been highly altered by thermokarst processes. It contains numerous deep erosive cuts created by the seasonal melting of the permafrost. Numerous baydzharakhs, thermokarst mounds, dot the landscape; they are the result of the melting of polygonal ice wedges within the permafrost.

== Vegetation ==
Rush/grass, forb, cryptogam tundra covers all of Faddeyevsky Island and most of Kotelny Island. It is tundra consisting mostly of very low-growing grasses, rushes, forbs, mosses, lichens, and liverworts. These plants either mostly or completely cover the surface of the ground. The soils are typically moist, fine-grained, and often hummocky.

Prostrate dwarfshrub, herb tundra covers all of Bunge Land and the eastern part of Kotelny Island adjacent to it. This type of tundra consists of dry tundra with open to patchy (20–80% cover) vegetation. The dominant plants comprising prostrate dwarfshrub, herb tundra are shrubs, i.e. Dryas spp. and Salix arctica, less than 5 cm tall, graminoids, and forbs. Lichens are also common.

== Climate ==
Kotelny Island has a harsh arctic climate, with temperatures only reaching above freezing briefly in the short summer months.

Climate data for Kotelny Island
Month	Jan	Feb	Mar	Apr	May	Jun	Jul	Aug	Sep	Oct	Nov	Dec	Year
Record high °C (°F)	−7.2 (19.0)	−3.3 (26.1)	−4.8 (23.4)	1.2 (34.2)	6.3 (43.3)	22.4 (72.3)	25.1 (77.2)	22.0 (71.6)	13.6 (56.5)	2.8 (37.0)	−1.7 (28.9)	−3.1 (26.4)	25.1 (77.2)
Mean daily maximum °C (°F)	−25.6 (−14.1)	−25.8 (−14.4)	−23.3 (−9.9)	−15.1 (4.8)	−5.6 (21.9)	2.1 (35.8)	5.9 (42.6)	5.2 (41.4)	1.1 (34.0)	−6.4 (20.5)	−16.5 (2.3)	−22.9 (−9.2)	−10.6 (13.0)
Daily mean °C (°F)	−28.8 (−19.8)	−29.1 (−20.4)	−26.6 (−15.9)	−18.5 (−1.3)	−7.8 (18.0)	0.2 (32.4)	3.3 (37.9)	2.9 (37.2)	−0.3 (31.5)	−8.7 (16.3)	−19.6 (−3.3)	−26.0 (−14.8)	−13.2 (8.2)
Mean daily minimum °C (°F)	−32.1 (−25.8)	−32.3 (−26.1)	−30.0 (−22.0)	−22.3 (−8.1)	−10.5 (13.1)	−1.6 (29.1)	1.0 (33.8)	0.9 (33.6)	−2.0 (28.4)	−11.5 (11.3)	−23.0 (−9.4)	−29.3 (−20.7)	−16.1 (3.1)
Record low °C (°F)	−44.9 (−48.8)	−49.9 (−57.8)	−46.1 (−51.0)	−46.2 (−51.2)	−28.6 (−19.5)	−14.9 (5.2)	−6.0 (21.2)	−9.2 (15.4)	−18.6 (−1.5)	−40.2 (−40.4)	−40.2 (−40.4)	−45.0 (−49.0)	−49.9 (−57.8)
Average precipitation mm (inches)	5.6 (0.22)	5.3 (0.21)	5.7 (0.22)	6.9 (0.27)	8.7 (0.34)	17.4 (0.69)	28.1 (1.11)	22.8 (0.90)	23.0 (0.91)	17.6 (0.69)	7.9 (0.31)	6.7 (0.26)	155.7 (6.13)
Average rainy days	0	0	0	0.1	1	8	15	15	9	0.4	0	0	49
Average snowy days	15	16	16	15	22	16	8	11	22	26	18	16	201
Average relative humidity (%)	82	82	82	83	87	90	90	91	90	88	84	82	86
Mean monthly sunshine hours	0	7	147	283	197	178	168	100	44	14	0	0	1,138
Source 1: Pogoda.ru.net
Source 2: NOAA (sun 1961–1990)

== Strategic importance ==
Between 1933 and 1993, Kotelny Island hosted an important Soviet naval (Northern Fleet) base. With the fall of the Soviet Union, the base was evacuated and only a civilian arctic research station remained located on the island. In late 2013, the first steps were taken to reactivate the base, with a temporary airstrip for flying in supplies and personnel established by a Russian naval task force that visited the New Siberian Islands during September 2013. Other initial infrastructure and supplies for the base, along with associated personnel were landed by the task force, whose flagship was the Kirov class Battlecruiser Petr Velikiy.

In September 2014, the 99th Tactic Arctic Group permanently established the base by beginning construction of a military air base, pier and accommodation for troops and their families. The airfield is now able to receive Ilyushin Il-76 aircraft all year long which significantly improves the bases ability to re-supply. The base is known as the Northern Shamrock.

== See also ==
- Baydzharakh
