= New Siberian Islands =

Archipelago in the Extreme North of Russia

Native name: Новосиби́рские Oстрова (Russian); Саҥа Сибиир Aрыылара (Yakut)
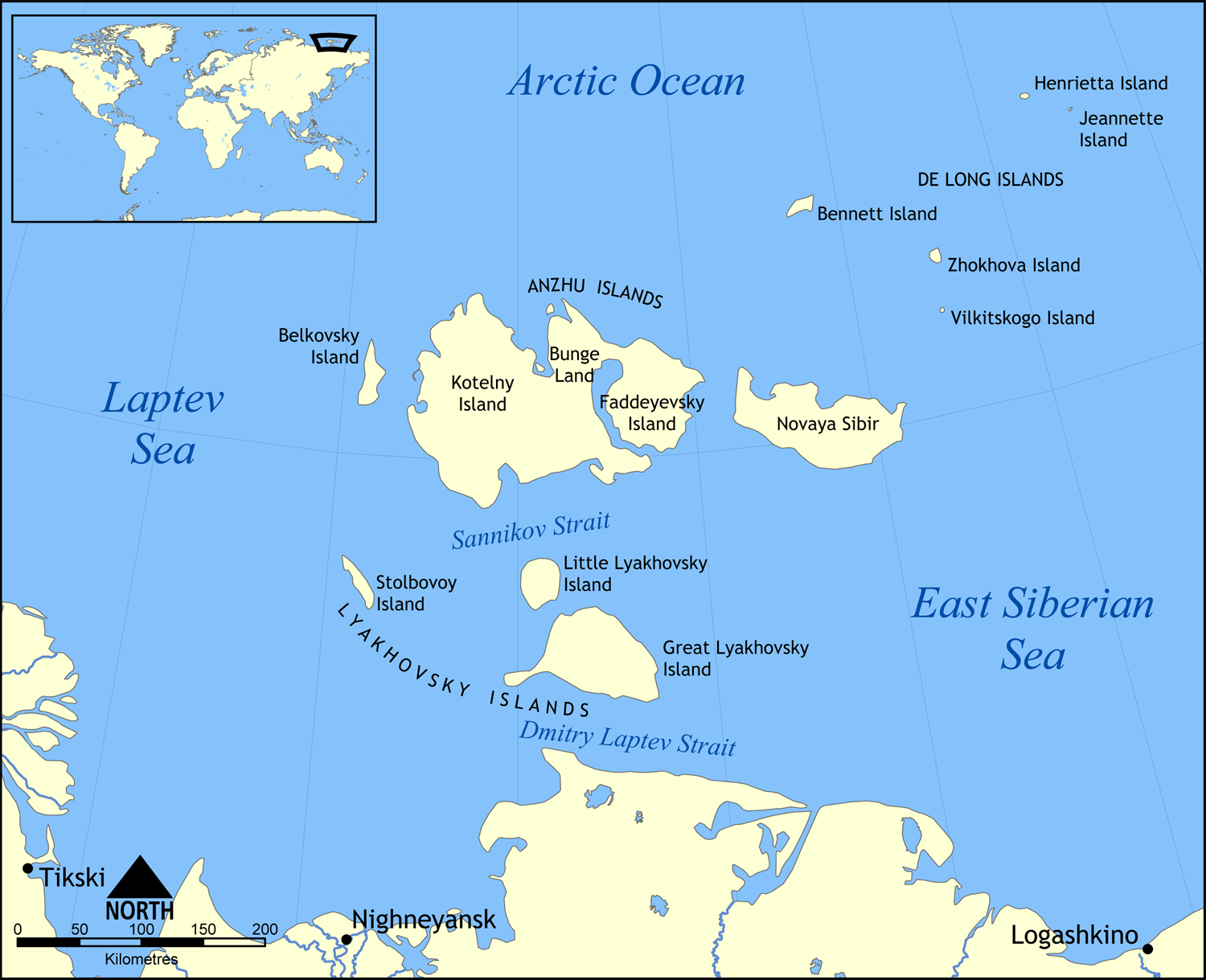
- Location of the New Siberian Islands

- Location within Russia

Geography
- Location: between the Laptev Sea and East Siberian Sea
- Coordinates: 75°16′N 145°15′E
- Archipelago: New Siberian Islands
- Area: 29,900 km^{2} (11,500 sq mi)
- Highest elevation: 374 m (1227 ft)
- Highest point: Malakatyn Tas

Administration
- Russian Federation
- Federal subject: Sakha Republic
- District: Bulunsky

Demographics
- Population: 250 (2017) on Kotelny Island

The New Siberian Islands (Russian: Новосиби́рские Oстрова, romanized: Novosibirskiye Ostrova; Yakut: Саҥа Сибиир Aрыылара, romanized: Saŋa Sibiir Arıılara) are an archipelago in the Extreme North of Russia, to the north of the East Siberian coast between the East Siberian Sea and the Laptev Sea north of the Sakha (Yakutia) Republic, of whose Bulunsky District they are administratively a part. Of the islands, only Kotelny Island is populated by humans.

== History ==
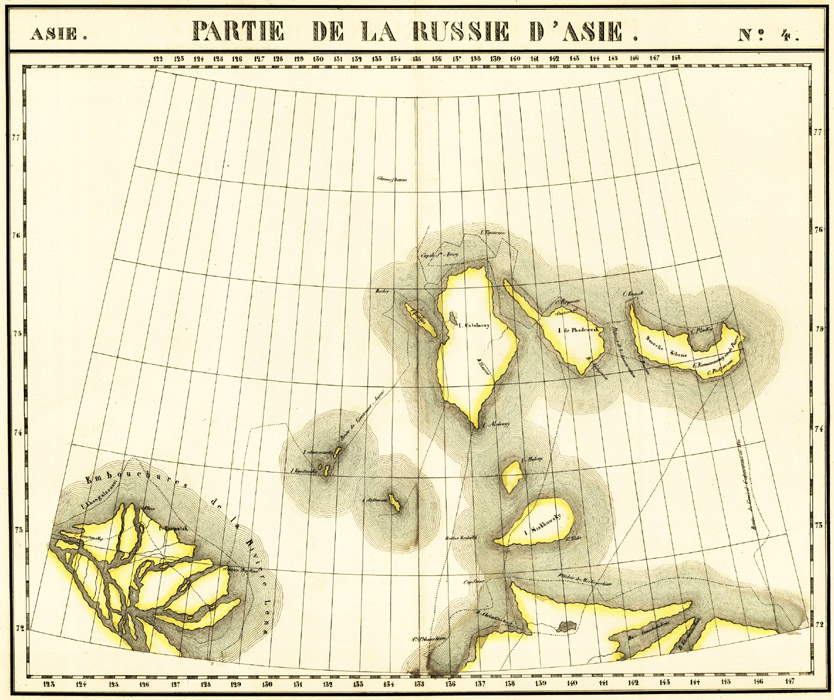
Map of the New Siberian Islands (Philippe Vandermaelen "Map of the Asian Russia", c. 1820). Bunge Land was not discovered yet so Faddeyevsky Island and Kotelny Island were considered separately.

The first news about the existence of the New Siberian Islands was brought by a Cossack, Yakov Permyakov, in the beginning of the 18th century. In 1712, a Cossack unit led by M. Vagin reached the Great Lyakhovsky Island.

In 1809–10 Yakov Sannikov and Matvei Gedenschtrom went to the New Siberian Islands on a cartographic expedition. Sannikov reported the sighting of a "new land" north of Kotelny in 1811. This became the myth of Zemlya Sannikova or Sannikov Land. In 1886, Russian polar explorer and scientist Eduard Toll, during his first visit to the New Siberian Islands, thought that he had seen an unknown land north of Kotelny Island. He guessed that this was the so-called Zemlya Sannikova.

Toll paid a further visit to the island group in early 1892, accompanied by one Cossack and three natives. He traveled over the ice in sleds drawn by dogs and reached the south coast of Great Lyakhovsky Island. Along the southern coast of this island he found well-preserved bones, ivory, peat, wood, and even a tree within 40-meter (130-foot) high sea cliffs that expose Late Pleistocene sediments. These sediments are cemented by permafrost and have accumulated periodically over the last 200,000 years.

In September 2014, the Russian Navy re-established a Soviet era naval base on Kotelny Island which had lain abandoned since 1993.

== Geography ==
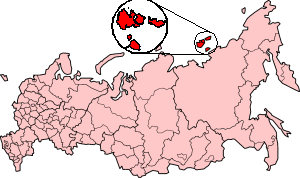
Location of the New Siberian Islands within Russia. (note: this map is pre 2007, as the Evenk, Taymyr and Koryak autonomous Okrugs still exist)

The New Siberian Islands proper, or Anzhu Islands (острова Анжу, Sakha: Анжу арыылара), covering a land area of about 29,000 km^{2}, consist of:

- Kotelny Island (о. Коте́льный) 11,700 km^{2} and
  - Faddeyevsky Island (о. Фадде́евский) 5,300 km^{2}. Bunge Land (земля́ Бу́нге) 6,200 km^{2} (occasionally submerged by sea) links Kotelny Island and Faddeyevsky Island. Very close to Bunge Land's northwestern coast lie two smaller islands:
    - Zheleznyakov Island (Ostrov Zheleznyakova), right off the NW cape and east of it, Matar Island (Ostrov Matar). Both islands have a length of about 5 km.
- Nanosnyy Island 76.283°N 140.416°E is a small island located due north off the northern bay formed by Kotelny and Bunge. It is C-shaped and only 4 km in length,
  but its geographical importance lies in the fact that it is the northernmost island of the New Siberian group.
- Novaya Sibir (о. Но́вая Сиби́рь) 6,200 km^{2}
- Belkovsky Island (о. Бельковский) 500 km^{2}

To the south and nearer to the Siberian mainland lie the Lyakhovskiye Islands (6,095 km^{2}):

- Great Lyakhovsky Island (о. Большо́й Ля́ховский) 4,600 km^{2}
- Little Lyakhovsky Island (о. Ма́лый Ля́ховский) 1,325 km^{2}
- Stolbovoy Island (о. Столбово́й) 170 km^{2}
- Semyonovsky Island (о. Семёновский) 0 km^{2} (now submerged)

The small De Long Islands (228 km^{2}) lie to the north-east of Novaya Sibir.

- Jeannette Island (о. Жанне́тты)
- Henrietta Island (о. Генрие́тты)
- Bennett Island (о. Бе́ннетта)
- Vilkitsky Island (о. Вильки́цкого)
- Zhokhov Island (о. Жо́хова)

The New Siberian Islands are low-lying. Their highest point is located on Bennett island, with an elevation of 426 m. They are part of the East Siberian Lowland, forming a geographical continuum with the continental plains further south.

The New Siberian Islands once formed major hills within the Great Arctic Plain that covered the northern part of Late Pleistocene "Beringia" between Siberia and Alaska during the Last Glacial Maximum (Late Weichselian Epoc). These islands represent the remains of about 1.6 million square kilometers of the formerly subaerial Great Arctic Plain that now lies submerged below parts of the Arctic Ocean, East Siberian Sea, and Laptev Sea. At this plain's greatest extent, sea level was 100–120 m below modern sea-level and the coastline lay 700 to 1000 kilometers north of its current position. This plain did not undergo extensive glaciation during the Late Pleistocene or the Last Glacial Maximum because it lay in the rain shadow of the Northern European ice sheet. During the frigid polar climate of the Last Glacial Maximum, 17,000 to 24,000 BC, small passive ice caps formed on the adjacent De Long Islands. Fragments of these ice caps remain on Jeannette, Henrietta, and Bennett Islands. Traces of former small slope and cirque glaciers in the form of buried ground ice deposits are preserved on Zhokhov Island. The sea submerged the Great Arctic Plain (except for the New Siberian and other isolated islands) within a relatively short time span of 7,000 years during the Early–Middle Holocene.

== Geology ==
As noted by Digby and numerous later publications, this archipelago consists of a mixture of folded and faulted sedimentary and igneous rocks ranging in age from Precambrian to Pliocene. The Lyakhovsky Islands consist of a folded and faulted assemblage of Precambrian metamorphic rocks; upper Paleozoic to Triassic sandstones and shales; Jurassic to lower Cretaceous turbidites; Cretaceous granites; and ophiolites. The Anzhu Islands consist of a highly faulted and folded assemblage of Ordovician to Devonian limestones, dolomites, sandstones, shales, volcanoclastic strata, and igneous rocks; upper Paleozoic to Triassic sandstones and shales; Jurassic to lower Cretaceous turbidites; and upper Cretaceous to Pliocene sandstones and shales. The De Long Islands consist of early Paleozoic, middle Paleozoic, Cretaceous, and Neogene sedimentary and igneous (mostly basalt) rocks. These sedimentary, metamorphic, and igneous rocks are mantled by loose Pleistocene and Holocene sediments that range in thickness from a fraction of a meter to about 35 meters (115 feet).

Digby also noted that some early papers published about the New Siberian Islands incorrectly describe them, often along with other Arctic islands (e.g. Wrangel Island), as being made up almost entirely of either mammoth bones and tusks or of ice, sand, and the bones of mammoths and other extinct megafauna. Some of these papers were written by persons (e.g. D. Gath Whitley) who had never visited the New Siberian Islands and relied upon anecdotes of traders and travelers and local folklore for their descriptions of them, and other articles were written by explorers and ivory hunters untrained in either geology or other sciences. Such statements have been shown to be fictional in nature by detailed studies of the geology of the New Siberian Islands by professional geologists, paleontologists, and other scientists.

=== Ivory deposits ===
As noted by Baron Eduard V. Toll in his account of the New Siberian Islands, sizeable and economically significant accumulations of fossil ivory occur within them. The ivory, along with mammoth and other bones, are found in recent beaches, drainage areas, river terraces and river beds. The New Siberian Islands are unique in the burial and preservation of fossil ivory "in such a wonderful state of preservation that the tusks so found cannot be distinguished from the very best and purest ivory".

The abundant bones, even skeletons, of mammoth, rhinoceros, musk-ox, and other megafauna along with the mammoth ivory found in these islands are preserved by permafrost, in which they are encased. The permafrost periodically developed in Late Pleistocene loess, solifluction, pond, and stream sediments as they accumulated. The radiocarbon dating of bones, ivory, and plants, optically stimulated luminescence dating of enclosing sediments, and uranium-thorium dating of associated peats demonstrate that they accumulated over a period of some 200,000 years. Radiocarbon dates obtained from the collagen of 87 mammoth tusks and bones collected from Faddeevsky, Kotelniy, and New Siberia islands ranged from 9470±40 BP to greater than 50,000 BP (^{14}C).

== Important Bird Area ==
The entire archipelago has been designated an Important Bird Area (IBA) by BirdLife International because it supports breeding populations of many species of birds.

== Climate ==
The climate is polar (Köppen ET) and severe. Snow cover is present for 9 months of the year.

- Average temperature in January: −28 to −31 °C (−18.4 to −23.8 °F)
- Temperature in July: At the coasts icy Arctic water keeps the temperatures relatively low. Average maximum temperatures here are from 8 to 11 °C (46.4 to 51.8 °F) and average minimum temperatures from −3 to 1 °C (26.6 to 33.8 °F). In the interior of the islands the average maximum temperatures in July are 16 to 19 °C (60.8 to 66.2 °F) and average minimum temperatures 3 to 6 °C (37.4 to 42.8 °F).
- Precipitation: up to 132 millimetres or 5.2 inches a year

Continuous permafrost rich in underground ice covers the archipelago. The surface of the islands is covered with Arctic tundra vegetation and numerous lakes.

The ocean surrounding the islands is covered with ice most of the year. During warm years, the ocean briefly opens for navigation July through October. During cold years, islands may remain ice-locked through the summer.

Polar night conditions are present November through February, and, conversely, the sun remains above the horizon continuously during summer months.

Climate data for Kotelny Island
Month	Jan	Feb	Mar	Apr	May	Jun	Jul	Aug	Sep	Oct	Nov	Dec	Year
Record high °C (°F)	−7.2 (19.0)	−3.3 (26.1)	−4.8 (23.4)	0.3 (32.5)	6.2 (43.2)	22.7 (72.9)	25.1 (77.2)	20.2 (68.4)	11.8 (53.2)	1.8 (35.2)	−2.5 (27.5)	−3.1 (26.4)	25.1 (77.2)
Mean daily maximum °C (°F)	−26.1 (−15.0)	−26.4 (−15.5)	−24.2 (−11.6)	−16.9 (1.6)	−6.2 (20.8)	1.4 (34.5)	5.7 (42.3)	4.3 (39.7)	0.3 (32.5)	−8.1 (17.4)	−18.2 (−0.8)	−23.8 (−10.8)	−11.5 (11.3)
Daily mean °C (°F)	−29.3 (−20.7)	−29.7 (−21.5)	−27.5 (−17.5)	−20.3 (−4.5)	−8.6 (16.5)	−0.4 (31.3)	2.9 (37.2)	2.1 (35.8)	−1.2 (29.8)	−10.7 (12.7)	−21.5 (−6.7)	−27.0 (−16.6)	−14.3 (6.3)
Mean daily minimum °C (°F)	−32.6 (−26.7)	−32.9 (−27.2)	−30.9 (−23.6)	−24.2 (−11.6)	−11.4 (11.5)	−2.1 (28.2)	0.6 (33.1)	0.2 (32.4)	−3.0 (26.6)	−13.7 (7.3)	−24.8 (−12.6)	−30.3 (−22.5)	−17.1 (1.2)
Record low °C (°F)	−44.9 (−48.8)	−49.9 (−57.8)	−46.1 (−51.0)	−46.2 (−51.2)	−28.6 (−19.5)	−14.9 (5.2)	−6.0 (21.2)	−9.2 (15.4)	−18.6 (−1.5)	−40.2 (−40.4)	−40.2 (−40.4)	−45.0 (−49.0)	−49.9 (−57.8)
Average precipitation mm (inches)	7 (0.3)	5 (0.2)	6 (0.2)	8 (0.3)	9 (0.4)	17 (0.7)	26 (1.0)	23 (0.9)	23 (0.9)	16 (0.6)	7 (0.3)	7 (0.3)	154 (6.1)
Average rainy days	0	0	0	0.1	1	8	15	15	9	0.4	0	0	49
Average snowy days	15	16	16	15	22	16	8	11	22	26	18	16	201
Average relative humidity (%)	82	82	82	83	87	90	90	91	90	88	84	82	86
Mean monthly sunshine hours	0	7	147	283	197	178	168	100	44	14	0	0	1,138
Source 1: Pogoda.ru.net
Source 2: NOAA (sun 1961–1990)

== Photo gallery ==
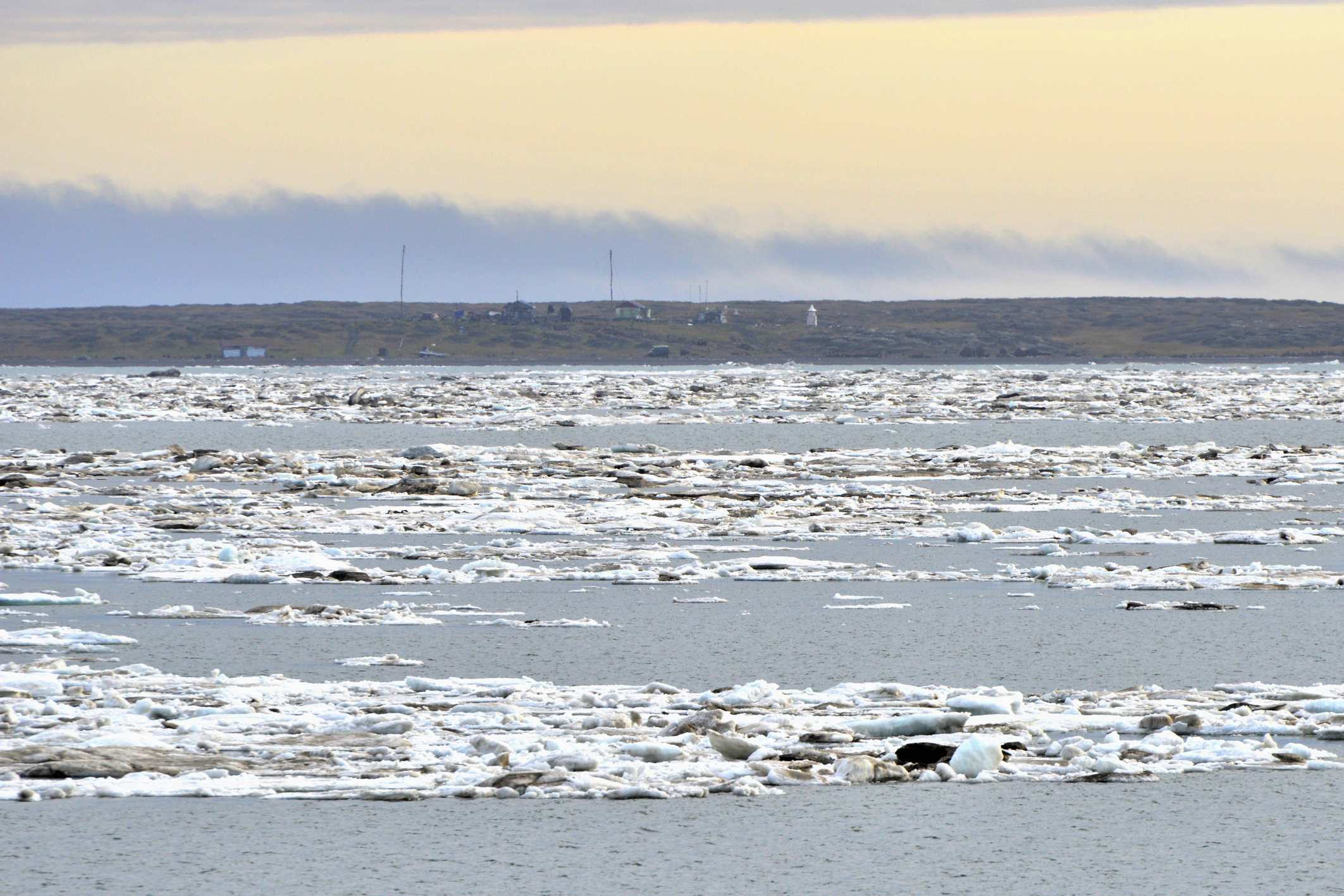
Weatherstation on Kotelny Island (Anzhu Islands; 74° 38′ N, 139° 10′ E)

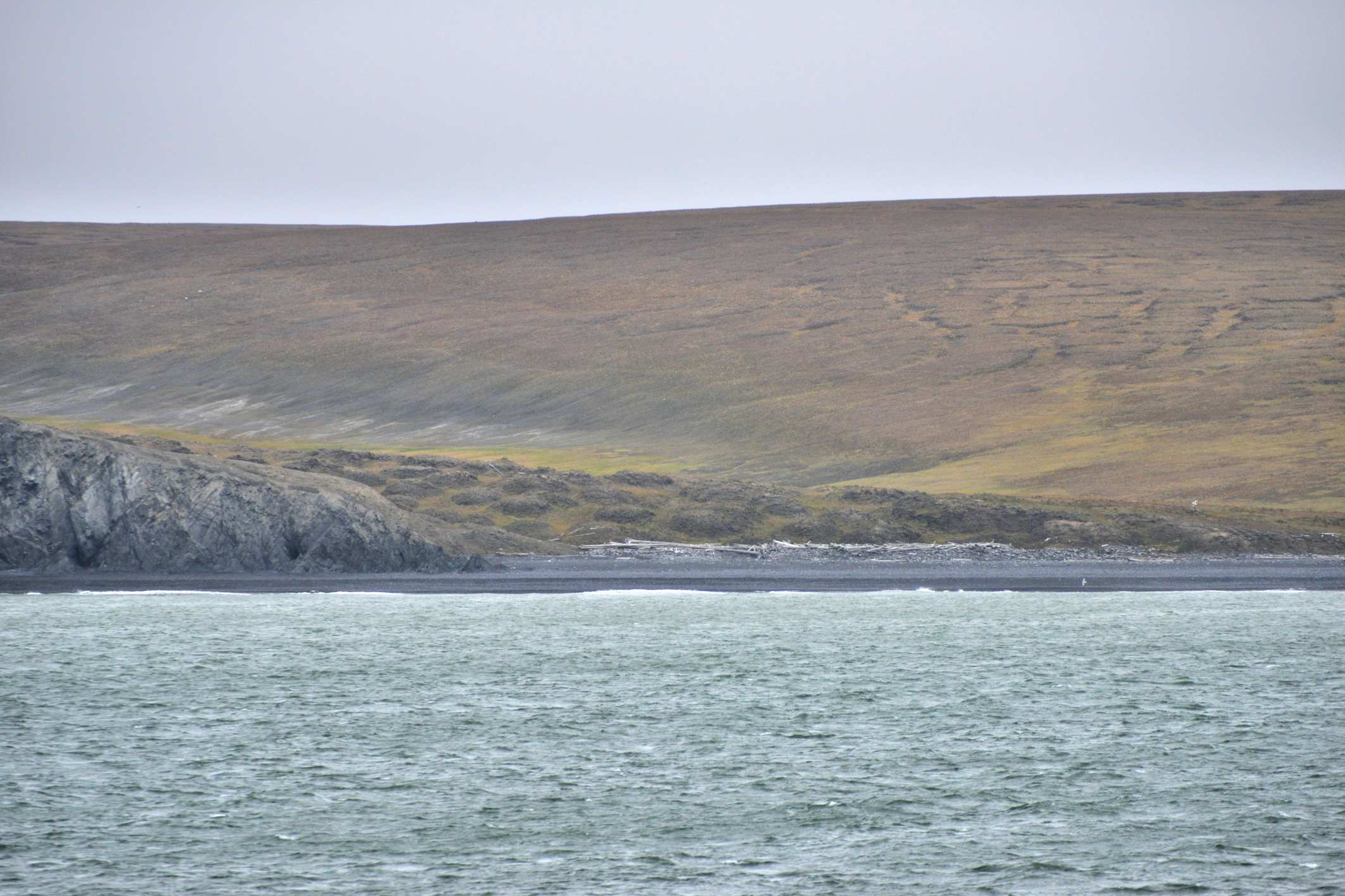
Belkovsky Island, Thilo Bay (Anzhu Islands; 75° 35′ 30″ N, 135° 38′ 44″ E)

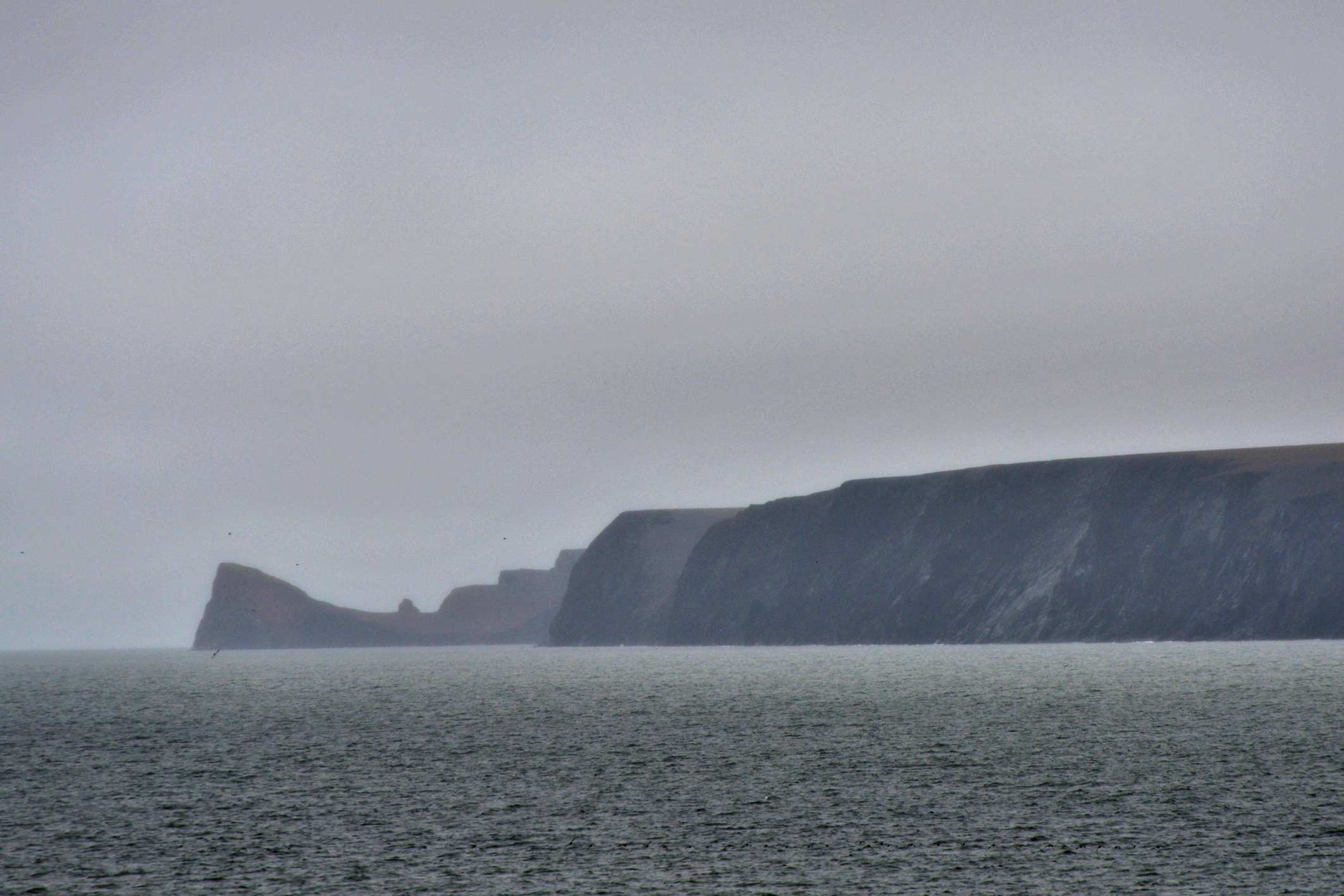
Belkovsky Island (Anzhu Islands; 75° 35′ 30″ N, 135° 38′ 44″ E)

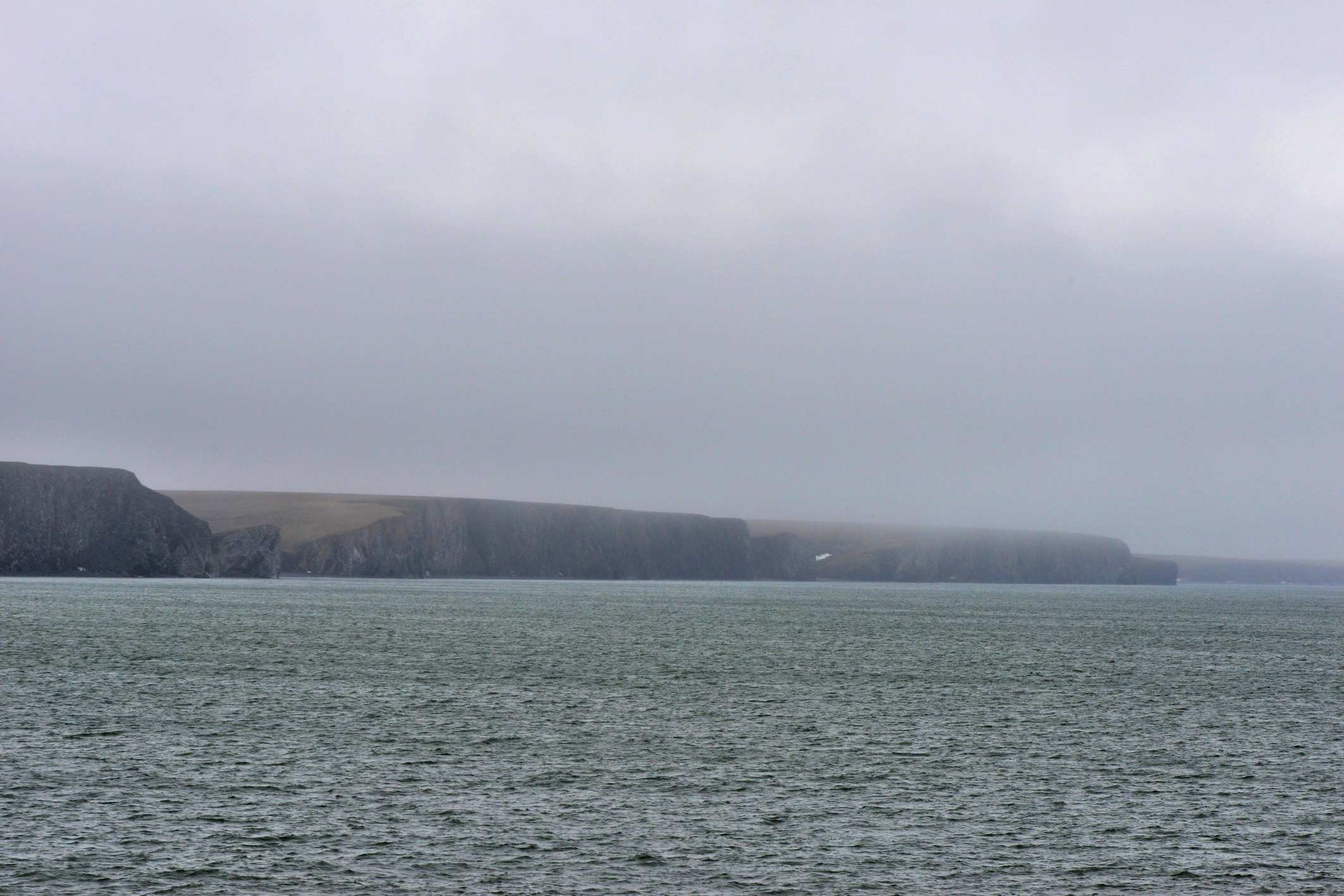
Belkovsky Island (Anzhu Islands; 75° 35′ 30″ N, 135° 38′ 44″ E)

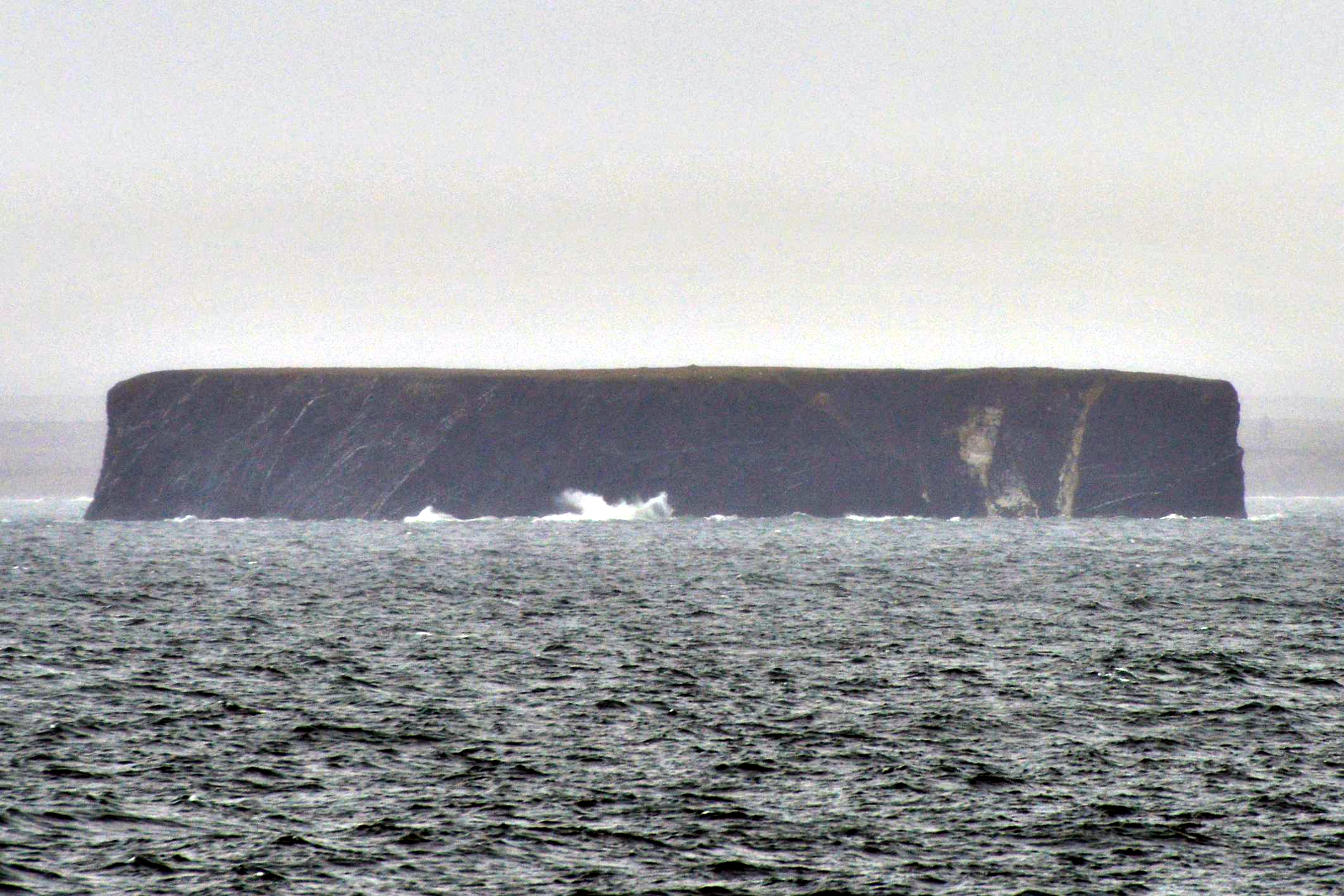
Strizhov Island, a small rock island at southwest tip of Belkovsky Island (75° 18′ 40″ N, 135° 28′ 52″ E)

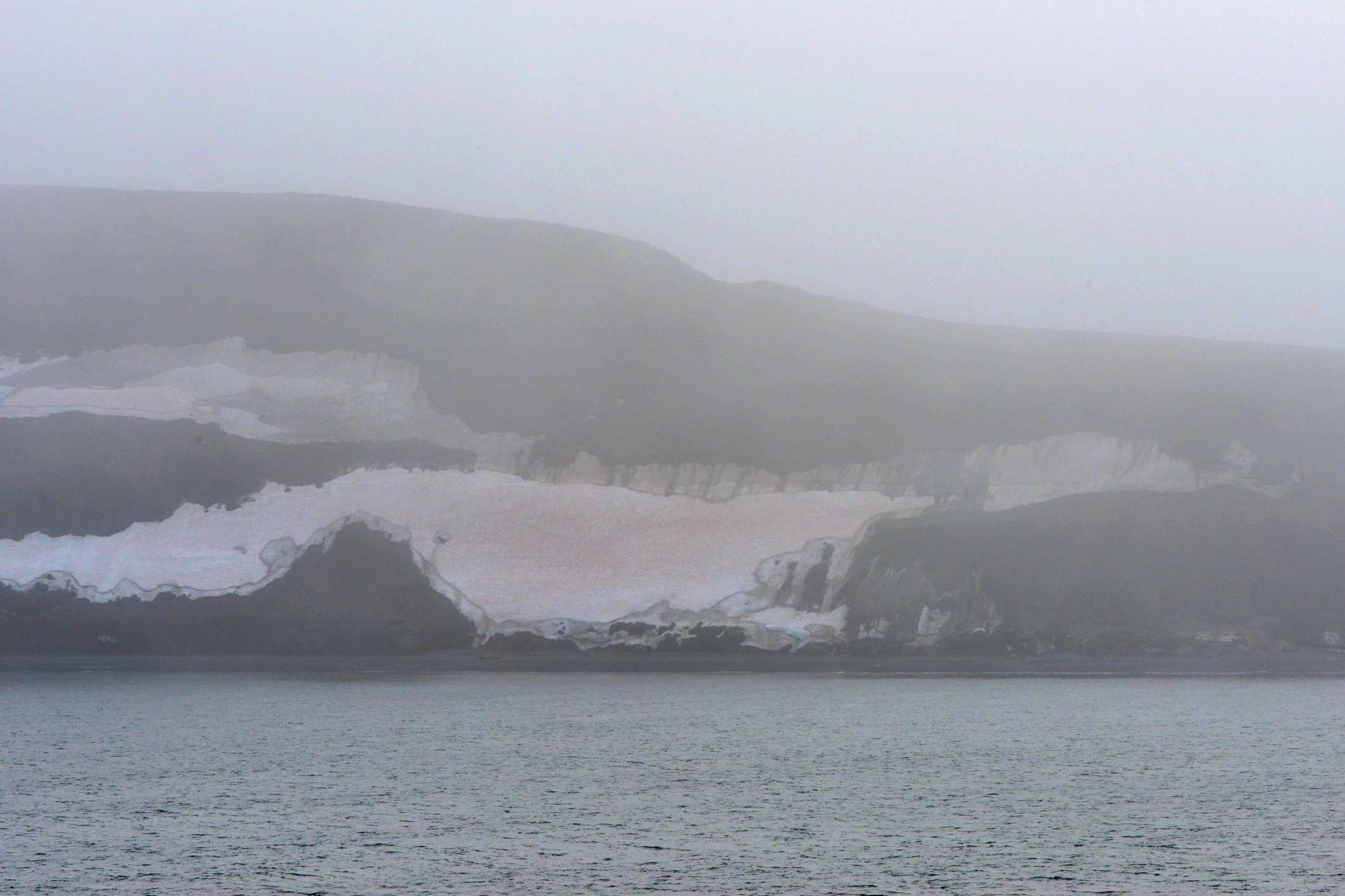
Bennett Island (De Long Islands) between Cape Sophia and Cape Emmelin (76° 41′ 37″ N, 149° 20′ E)

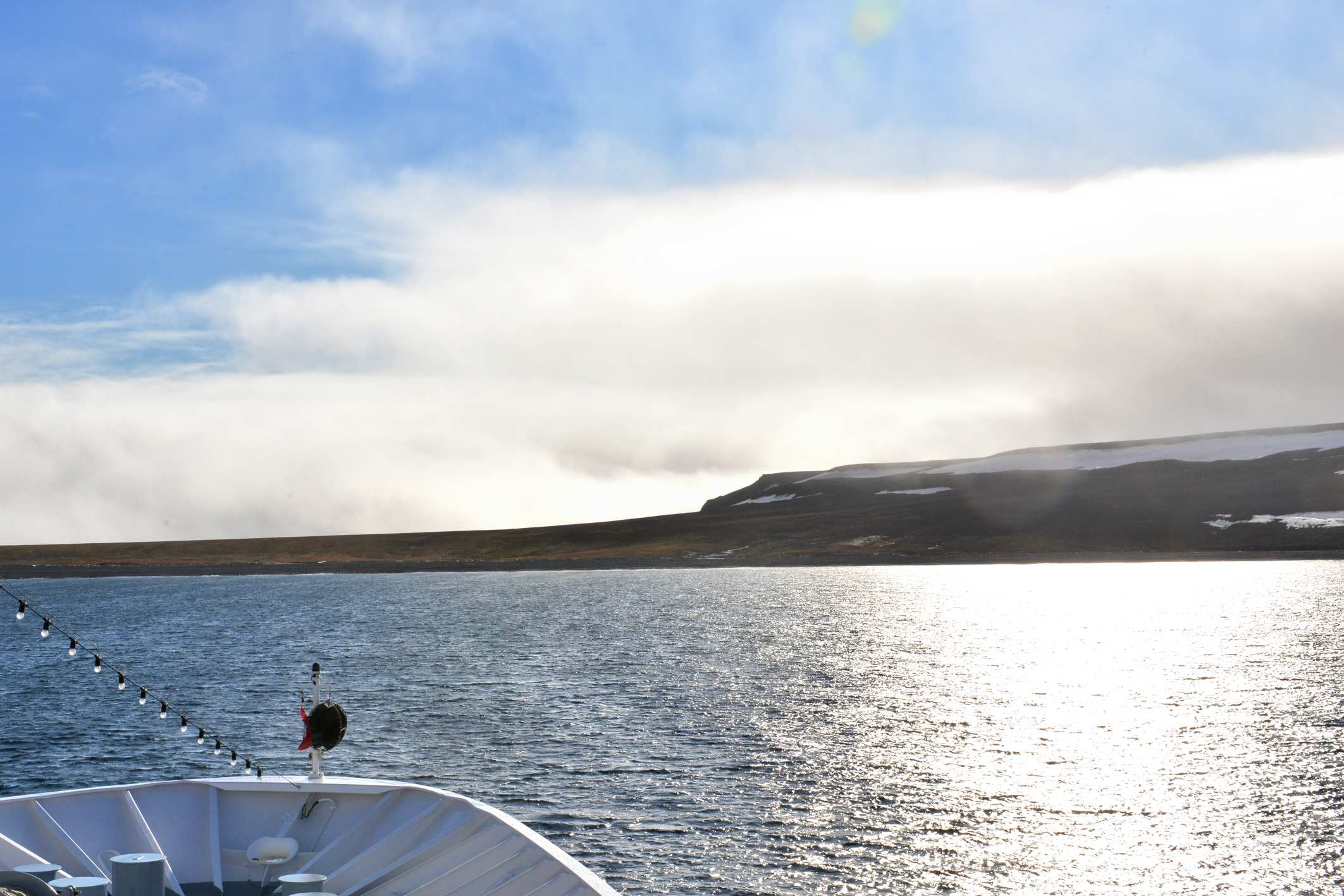
Bennett Island – M/S Hanseatic anchoring in the roads at the north coast

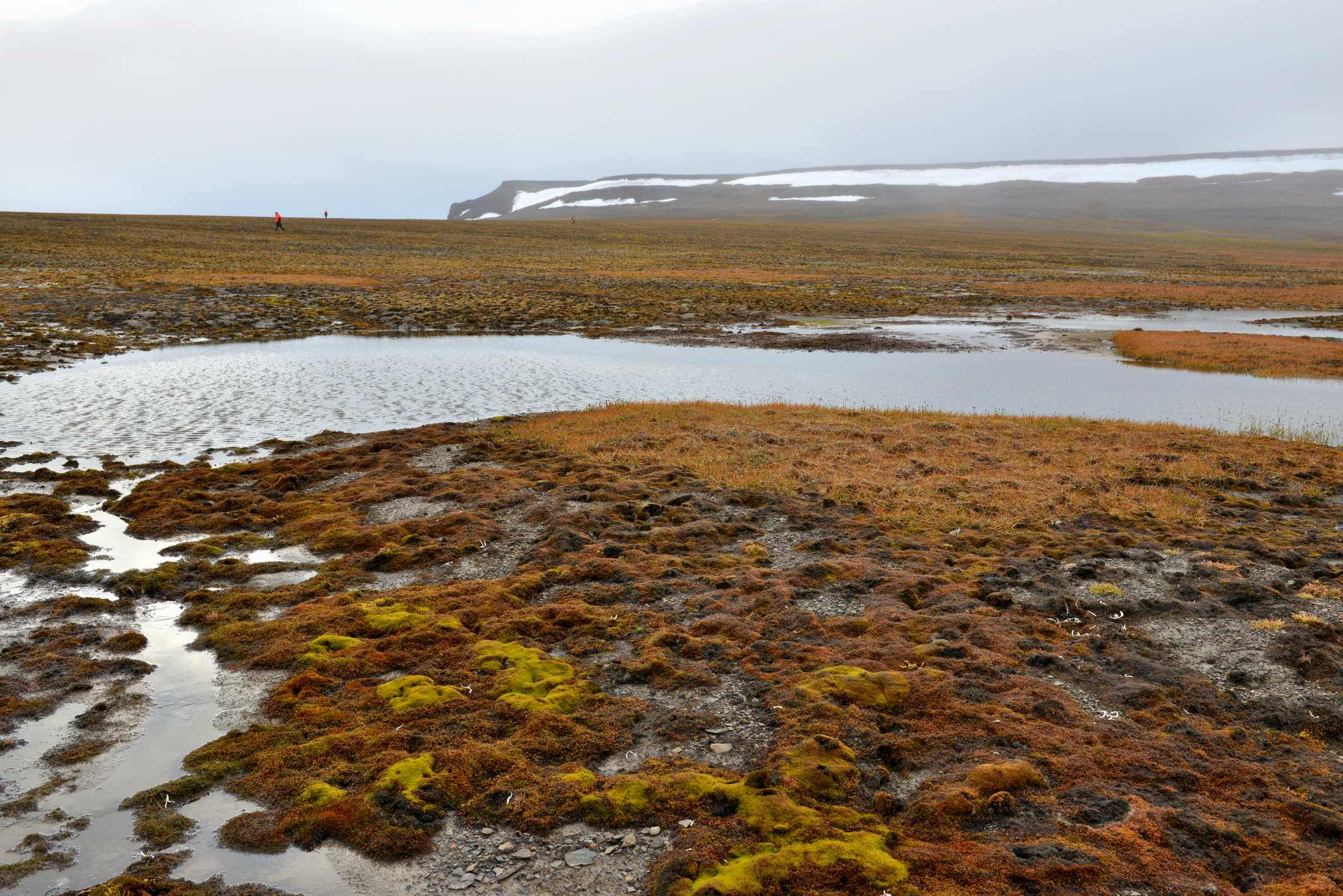
Bennett Island, north coast – tundra landscape (76° 44′ 30″ N, 149° 21′ 19″ E)

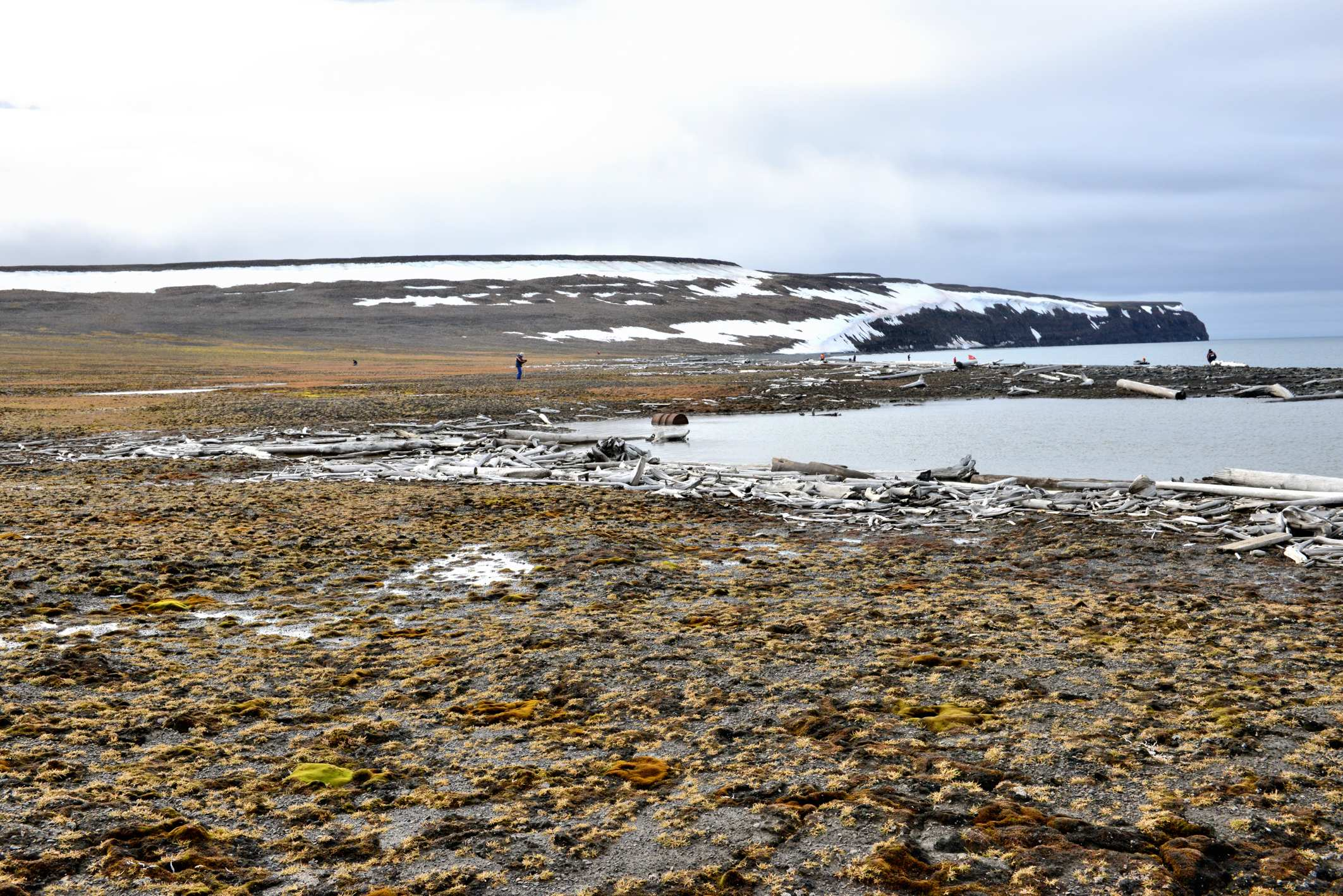
Bennett Island, north coast – tundra landscape

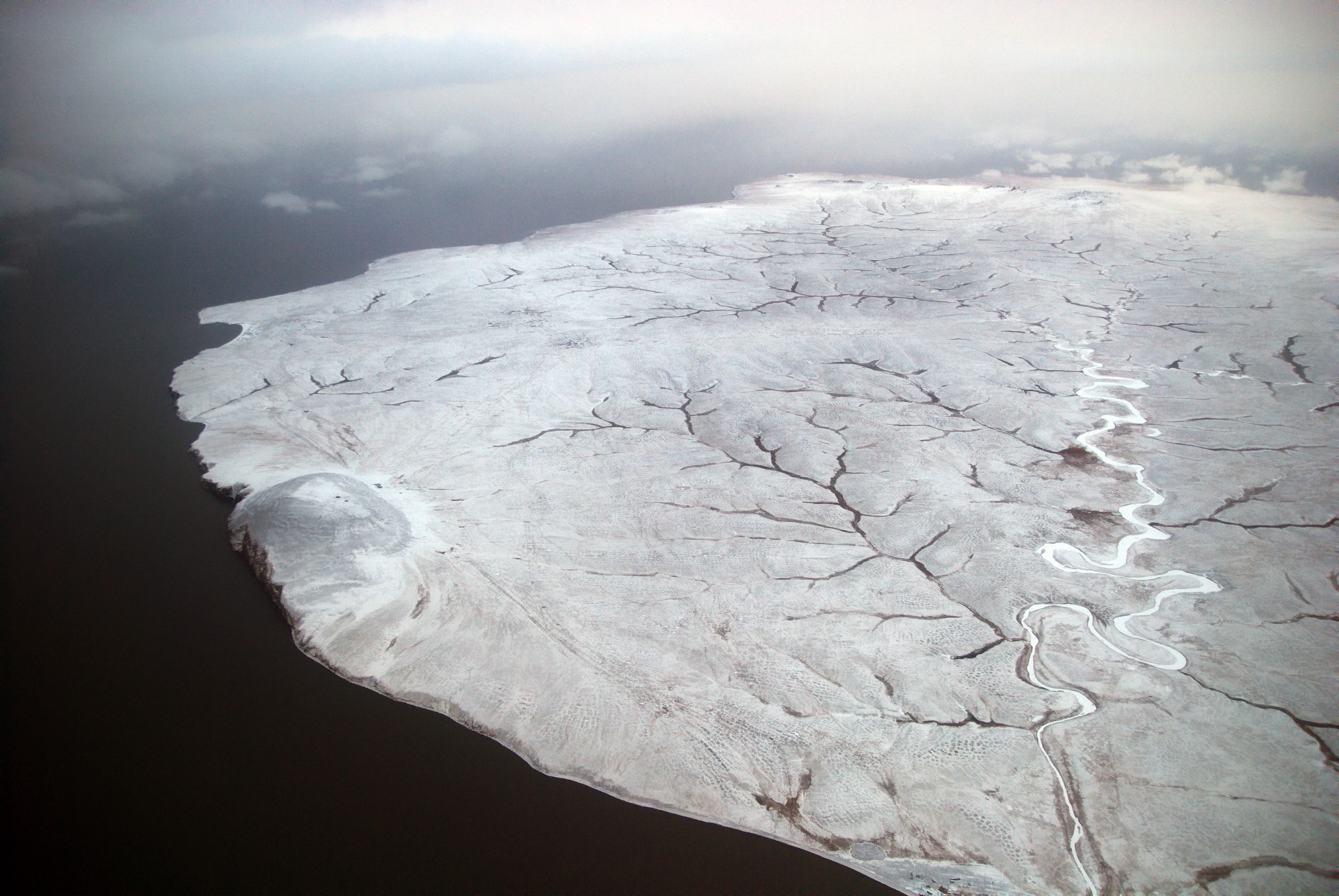
Bolshoy Lyakhovsky Island, view of the Kigilyakh Peninsula

== See also ==
- Arctic Alaska-Chukotka terrane
- Genesis 2.0
- Kigilyakh
- Lists of islands
- Lomonosov Ridge
