= Laptev =

Laptev (Russian: Лаптев) may refer to:

- Laptev Sea, one of the seas in the Arctic Ocean
- Laptev Strait, strait in Russian Far East

== People with the surname ==
- Ari Laptev (born 1950), Ukrainian mathematician
- Dmitry Laptev (1701–1771), Russian explorer
- Ivan Laptev (born 1979), Russian Ingrian Lutheran theologian
- Ivan Laptev (politician) (1934–2025), Russian journalist and politician
- Khariton Laptev (1700–1763), Russian explorer
- Vladimir Laptev (1945–2025), Russian politician
- Yury Laptev (born 1960), Russian opera singer, opera director, theatre lecturer, and presidential adviser
- Yuri Grigorievich Laptev (1903–1984), Russian and Soviet writer, journalist and actor
