= Kigilyakh Peninsula =

Peninsula in the New Siberian Islands, Sakha Republic, Russia

Полуостров Кигилях
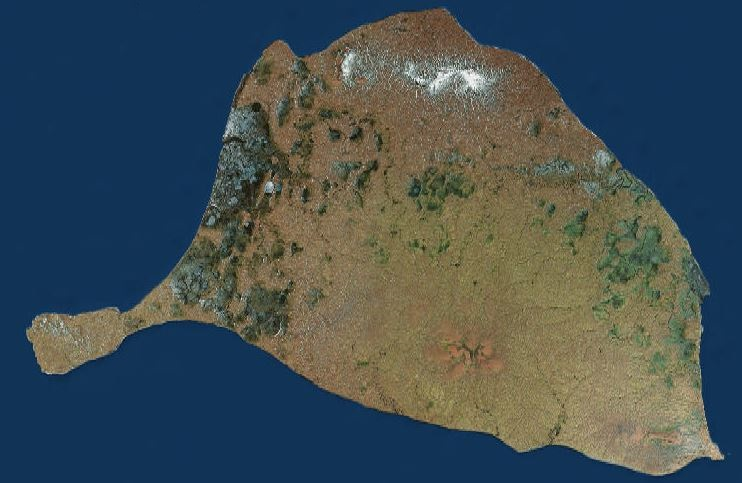
- Bolshoy Lyakhovsky Landsat image with the Kigilyakh Peninsula extending southwestwards on the left.

- Location within Sakha Republic

Geography
- Location: Bolshoy Lyakhovsky, New Siberian Islands
- Coordinates: 73°24′N 140°7′E
- Adjacent to: Arctic Ocean; East Siberian Sea
- Length: 25 km (15.5 mi)
- Width: 10 km (6 mi)
- Highest elevation: 164 m (538 ft)
- Highest point: Gora Sannikov-Taga

Administration
- Russia
- Federal subject: Sakha Republic

Kigilyakh Peninsula (Russian: Полуостров Кигилях) is a peninsula in the New Siberian Islands, Sakha Republic, Russia.

== History ==
This geographic feature was named after the Kigilyakh stone pillars. In Soviet times on the Kigilyakh Peninsula, Vladimir Voronin, then in charge of the Polar station on the island, was shown a large standing rock that had been heavily eroded and which gave name to the peninsula.

== Geography ==
The Kigilyakh Peninsula is located in Bolshoy Lyakhovsky Island on the Laptev Sea. The peninsula is conspicuous from the air, projecting southwestwards from the western end with its isthmus in the east. Notable landmarks include Cape Vagin in the northwest and Cape Kigilyakh on the southwestern shore, both marking the westernmost points of Bolshoy Lyakhovsky. Additional geographic features of the peninsula include the Malakatyn River and the Gora Malakatyn-Chokur hill.

There is a scientific research base near Cape Kigilyakh.

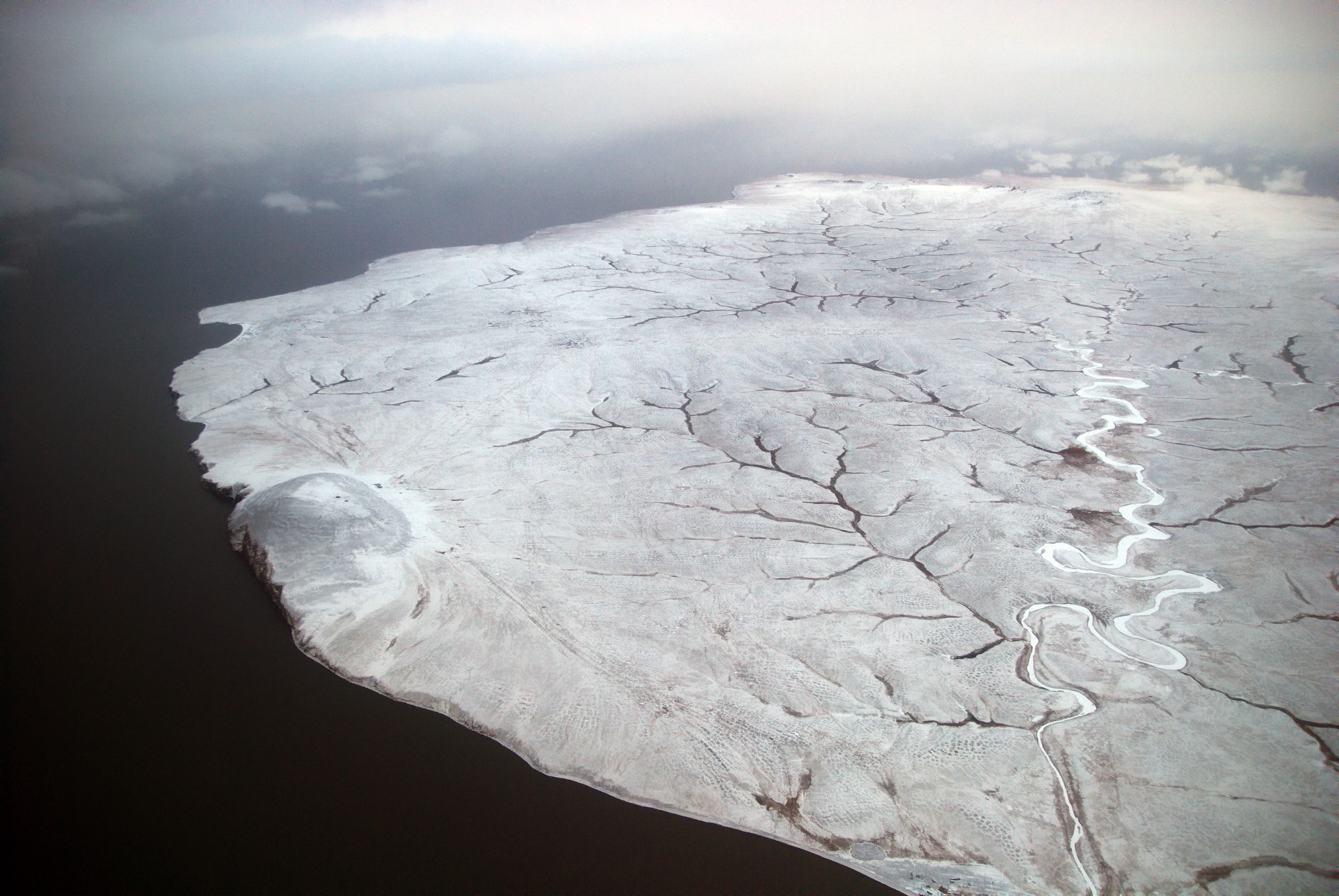
View of the Kigilyakh Peninsula.

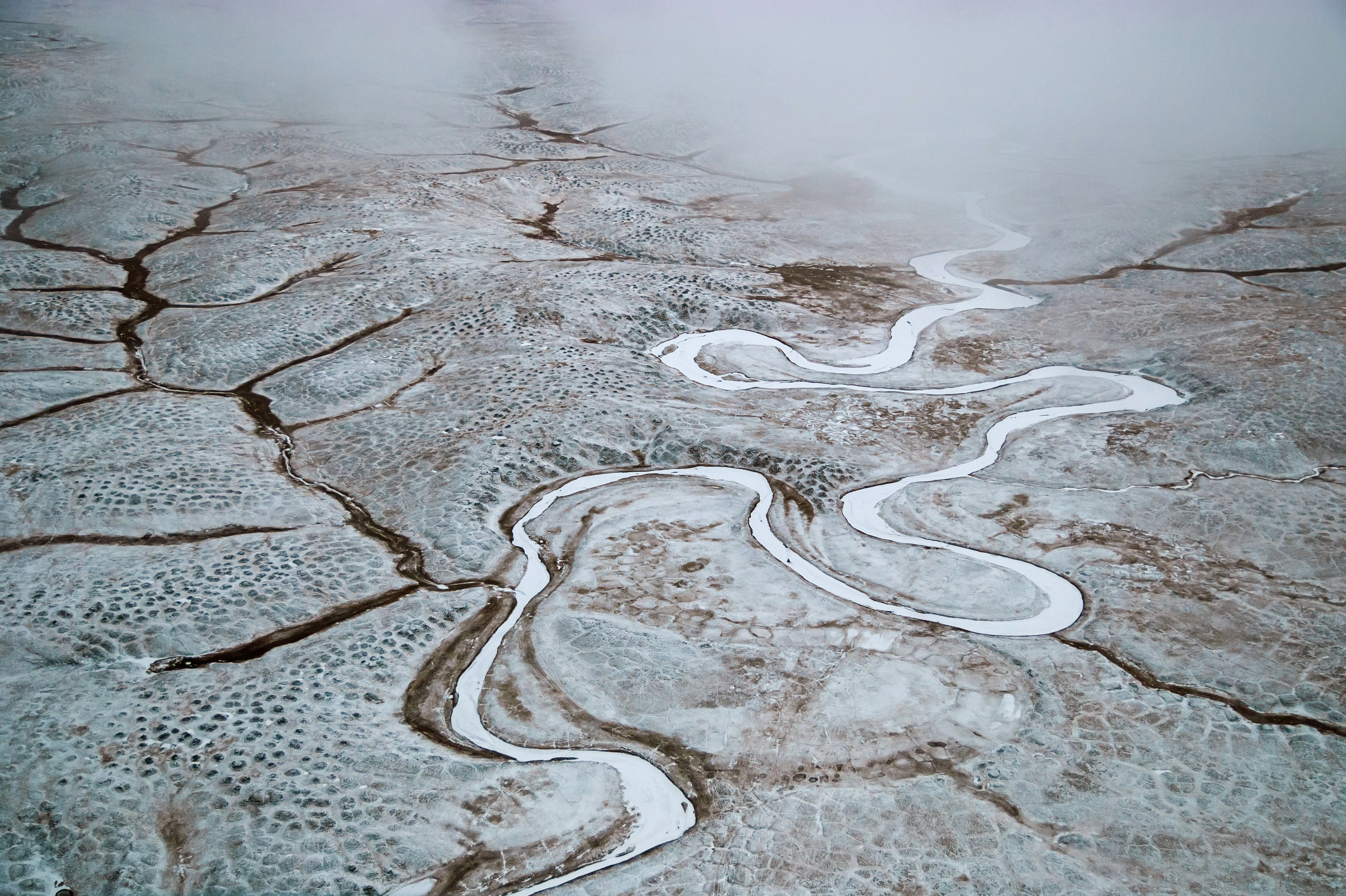
Section of the frozen Malakatyn river from the air.

== See also ==
- Kigilyakh
