= Kigilyakh =

Natural tall rock pillars in Yakutia

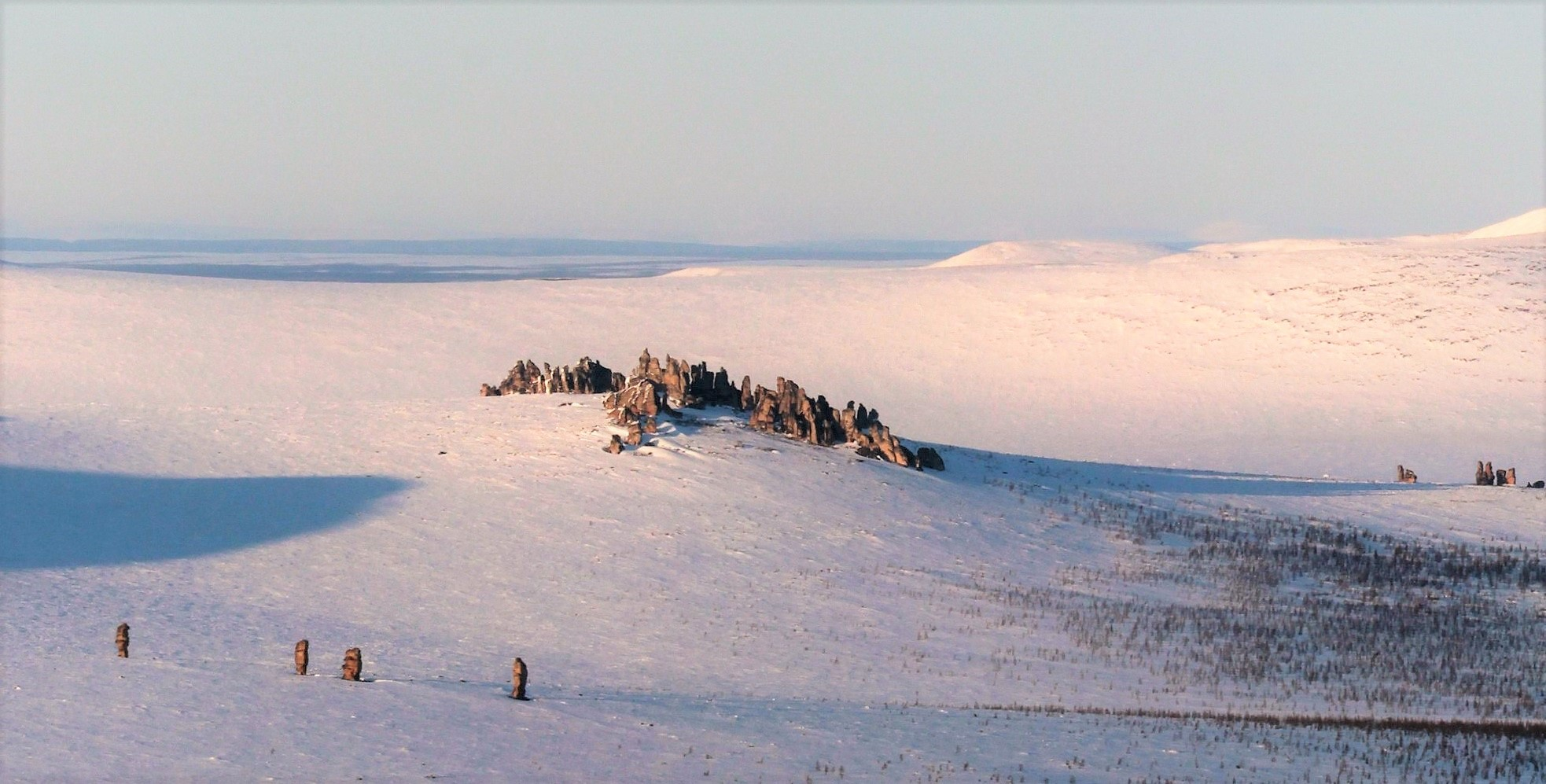
Kigilyakhs in the Ulakhan-Sis Range

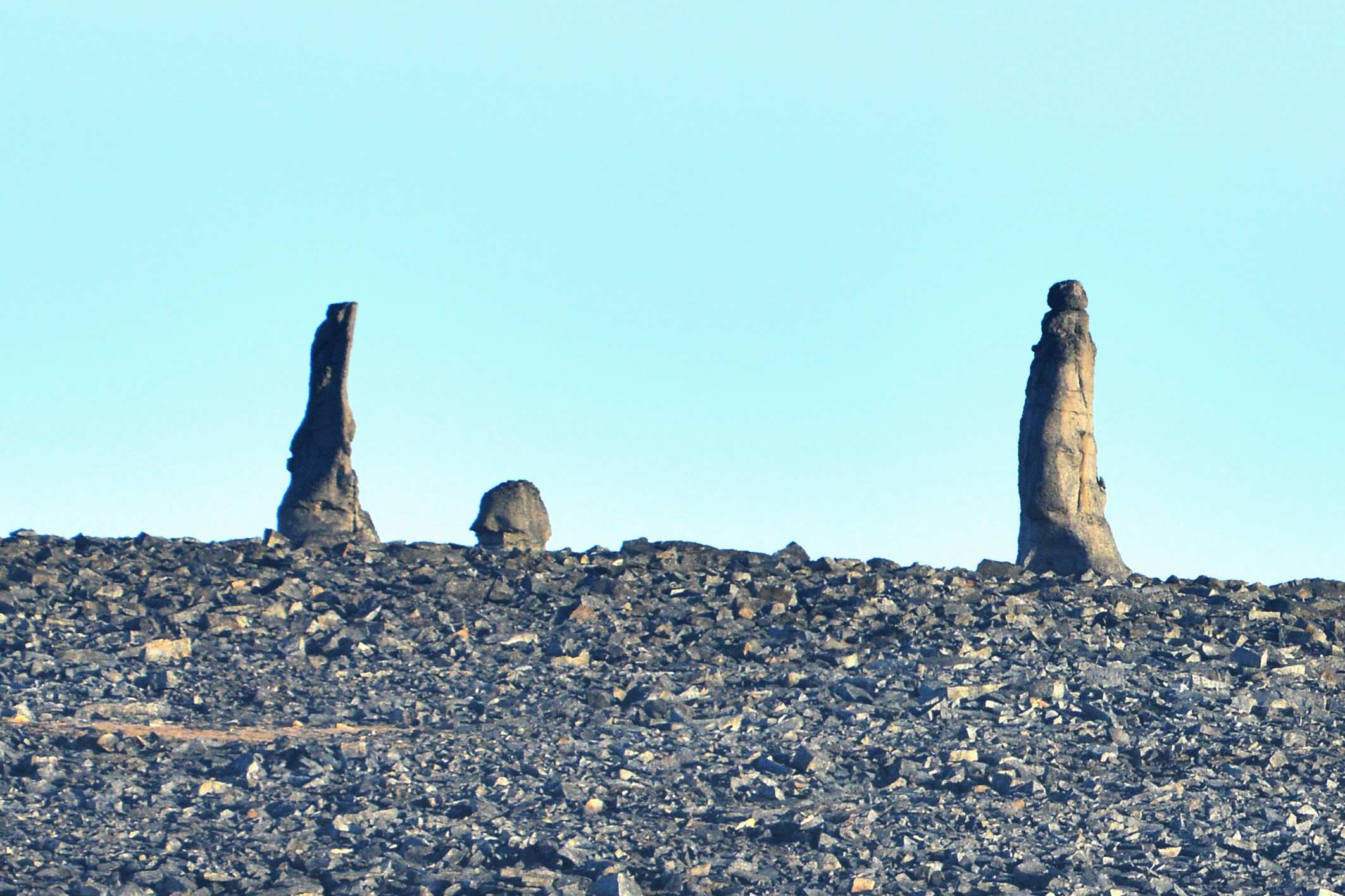
Kigilyakhs on Chetyryokhstolbovoy Island, East Siberian Sea

Kigilyakh or kisiliyakh (Russian: кигиляхи; Yakut: киһилээх, romanized: kihilēx, lit. 'stone person', plural киһилээхлэрэ kihilēxlere) are pillar-like natural rock formations looking like tall monoliths standing more or less isolated. Usually they are composed of granite or sandstone shaped as a result of cryogenic weathering. Most kigilyakhs formed during the Early Cretaceous and are about 120 million years old.

== Cultural significance and etymology ==
These anthropomorphic rock pillars are an important feature in Yakut culture. Often they are slightly scattered, protruding from the surface of smooth mountains and giving the impression of a standing crowd of people. According to Yakut legends, kigilyakhs were created from ancient people who were turned into stone. Legends say that in ancient times the climate of northeastern Yakutia was warmer, but when it started cooling, people fled south. It is said that demons, abasy, turned them into stone as they were migrating.

The Yakut word "kisiliy" means "a place where there are people". Kisilyakh means "mountain having a man" or "mountain married". The term "kigilyakh" is a distorted form of the original Yakut "kisilyakh".

== Locations ==
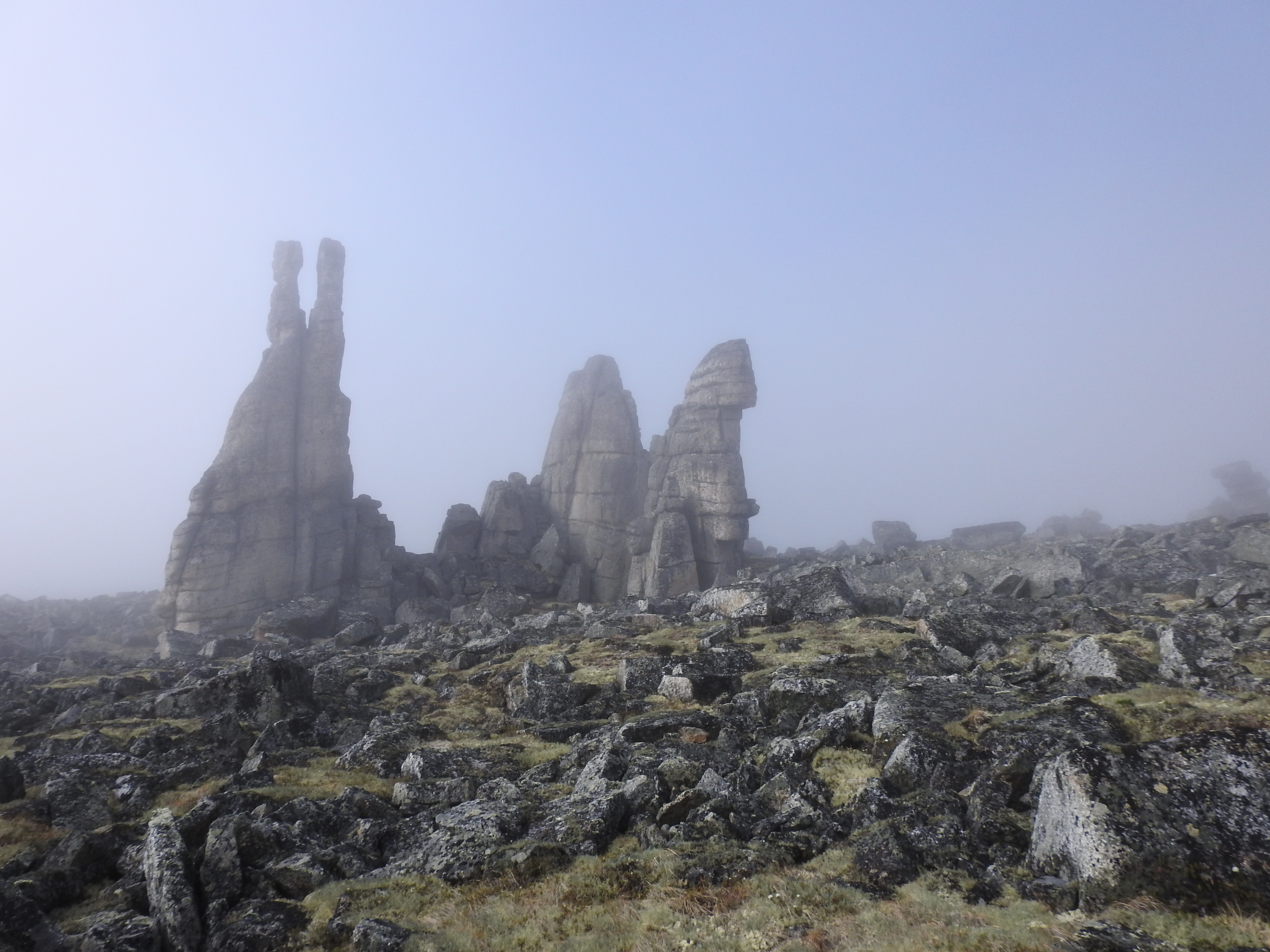
Bizarre Ulakhan-Sis Range kigilyakh rock formations. Yana-Indigirka Lowland, Republic of Sakha (Yakutia), Northern Siberia, Russia

Such stones are found in different places of Sakha (Yakutia), Russia, mainly in the East Siberian Lowland:

- Alazeya Plateau
- Anabar Plateau
- Kigilyakh Peninsula, with Mount Kigilyakh and Cape Kigilyakh, Bolshoy Lyakhovsky Island, New Siberian Islands
- Kisilyakh Range, part of the Chersky Range
- Kisilyakh-Tas, an isolated mountain located in the Kolyma Lowland, roughly 160 kilometres (99 mi) from the coast of the East Siberian Sea, on the right bank of the Alazeya River at 69°40′N 155°0′E.
- Kyun-Tas
- Chetyryokhstolbovoy Island, Medvezhyi Islands, East Siberian Sea
- New Siberian Islands
- Oymyakon Highlands
- Polousny Range
- Stolbovoy Island, Laptev Sea
- Suor Uyata range
- Ulakhan Sis

Outside of Yakutia, similar formations are found in the island of Popova-Chukchina and the Putorana Plateau, in Krasnoyarsk Krai.

== History ==
Ferdinand von Wrangel reported on the kigilyakhs on Chetyryokhstolbovoy, an island of the Medvezhyi Islands in the East Siberian Sea. He visited the island during his 1821-1823 expedition and named it after them (Chetyryokhstolbovoy meaning "four pillars"). The kigilyakhs on Chetyryokhstolbovoy Island are about 15 m (49 ft) high.

In the Soviet Union on the Kigilyakh Peninsula at the western end of Bolshoy Lyakhovsky Island, a New Siberian Islands named after Vladimir Voronin, then in charge of the polar station on the island, was shown a large standing rock which had been heavily eroded and which gave its name to the peninsula.

== See also ==
- Monolith
- Pinnacle (geology)
- Baydzharakh
- Yardang
