= Khariton Laptev (icebreaker) =

History

→ Soviet Union → Russia
- Name: Ledokol-3 (Ледокол-3) (1962–1966); Khariton Laptev (Харитон Лаптев) (1966–1996)
- Namesake: Khariton Laptev
- Owner: Sakhalin Shipping Company
- Port of registry: Vanino, Soviet Union (1962–1992); Vanino, Russia (1992–1996); Vung Tau, Vietnam (1996)
- Builder: Admiralty Shipyard (Leningrad, USSR)
- Yard number: 765
- Laid down: 10 February 1962
- Launched: 11 August 1962
- Completed: 25 December 1962
- Decommissioned: 1996
- In service: 1962–1996
- Identification: IMO number: 6500806
- Fate: Broken up

General characteristics
- Class & type: Dobrynya Nikitich-class icebreaker
- Displacement: 2,935 t (2,889 long tons)
- Length: 67.7 m (222 ft)
- Beam: 18 m (59 ft)
- Draught: 5.35 m (17.6 ft)
- Depth: 8.3 m (27.2 ft)
- Installed power: 3 × 13D100 (3 × 1,800 hp)
- Propulsion: Diesel-electric; three shafts (2 × 2,400 hp + 1,600 hp)
- Speed: 15 knots (28 km/h; 17 mph)
- Range: 5,700 nautical miles (10,600 km; 6,600 mi) at 13 knots (24 km/h; 15 mph)
- Endurance: 17 days
- Complement: 42

Khariton Laptev (Russian: Харитон Лаптевн) was a Soviet and later Russian icebreaker in service from 1962 until 1996. It was one of twelve Project 97A icebreakers built by Admiralty Shipyard in Leningrad in 1961–1971.

== Description ==
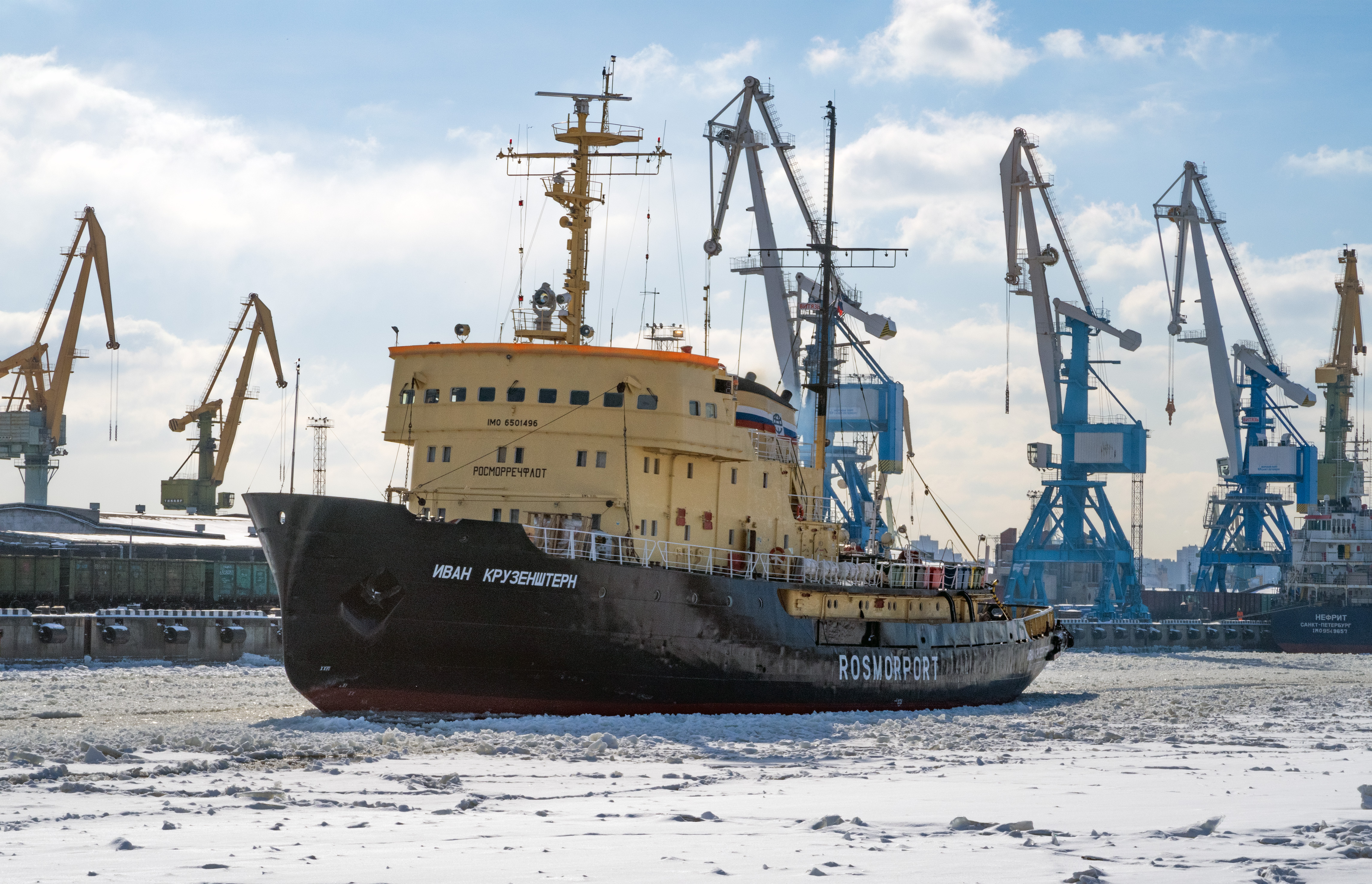
Ivan Kruzenstern, a similar Project 97A icebreaker

In the mid-1950s, the Soviet Union began developing a new diesel-electric icebreaker design based on the 1942-built steam-powered icebreaker Eisbär to meet the needs of both civilian and naval operators. Built in various configurations until the early 1980s, the Project 97 icebreakers and their derivatives became the largest and longest-running class of icebreakers and icebreaking vessels built in the world. Of the 32 ships built in total, the unarmed civilian variant Project 97A was the most numerous with twelve icebreakers built in 1961–1971.

Project 97A icebreakers were 67.7 metres (222 ft) long overall and had a beam of 18 metres (59 ft). Fully laden, the vessels drew 5.35 metres (17.6 ft) of water and had a displacement of 2,935 tonnes (2,889 long tons). Their three 1,800-horsepower (1,300 kW) 10-cylinder 13D100 two-stroke opposed-piston diesel engines were coupled to generators that powered electric propulsion motors driving two propellers in the stern and a third one in the bow. Project 97A icebreakers were capable of breaking 70 to 75 centimetres (28 to 30 in) thick snow-covered ice at very slow but continuous speed.

== History ==
The third of twelve Project 97A icebreakers was laid down at Admiralty Shipyard in Leningrad on 10 February 1962, launched on 11 August 1962, and delivered to the Sakhalin Shipping Company on 25 December 1962. Initially named simply Ledokol-3 (Russian: Ледокол-3), Russian for "icebreaker", it was renamed Khariton Laptev in 1966 after the 18th century Russian naval officer and Arctic explorer. The icebreaker was stationed in Vanino in the Russian Far East.

Following the dissolution of the Soviet Union, Khariton Laptev passed over to the successor state, Russia.

Khariton Laptev was taken out of service in 1996 and sold to Vietnam for scrapping.
