= Great Siberian Polynya =

The Great Siberian Polynya (Russian: Великая Сибирская полынья) is a strip of open water and young ice that regularly forms beyond the outer edge of the fast ice in the area from Bolshoy Begichev Island in the Laptev Sea to the Medvezhyi Islands in the East Siberian Sea. In some years, the polynya significantly decreases and two relatively independent areas of open water and young ice form - the Lena and Novosibirsk polynyas.

An early information about ice-free waters beyond Arctic fast ice was obtained in the 18th century. As early as 1736, Lomonosov wrote in his "Brief Description of Various Voyages in the Northern Seas and an Indication of a Possible Passage through the Siberian Ocean to East India", based on historical documents and information received from the Pomors, "at a distance of five and seven hundred miles from the Siberian shores, the Siberian Ocean in the summer months is free of such ice that would impede ship travel." He also gave a description of the mechanism of the formation of the ice-free area. According to him, southern winds push the ices to the pole and open the waters heated by the sea bottom.

== See also ==
- Polynya
- Matvei Gedenshtrom
