= Matvei Gedenshtrom =

Russian explorer of Northern Siberia

- Born: 1780; Riga
- Died: 1845 (aged 65); Khaidukovo near Tomsk
- Occupation: Explorer

Mathias or Matthias Hedenström (Swedish; 1780 – 2 October [O.S. 20 September] 1845), also known by his Russian name Matvei Matveyevich Gedenshtrom (Note: In this name that follows East Slavic naming customs, the patronymic is Matveyevich and the family name is Gedenshtrom.) (Матвей Матвеевич Геденштром), was a Russian explorer of Northern Siberia, writer, and public servant.

== Life ==
Gedenshtrom was born in Riga, then part of the Russian Empire to Mathias Hedenström (1733–1799), a Swedish political refugee from Dalarna. Matvei Gedenshtrom himself was still a Swedish citizen in 1798.

Gedenshtrom attended the University of Tartu. He did not finish his studies and left his alma mater in favor of work at Tallinn customs. Until 1806, he worked in Riga as a translator for Count Friedrich von Buxhoeveden, the Governor-General of the Baltic provinces. During the Finnish War in 1808, while working as secretary to a customs inspector, he was arrested in connection with a bribery affair, tried, and then banished to Siberia.

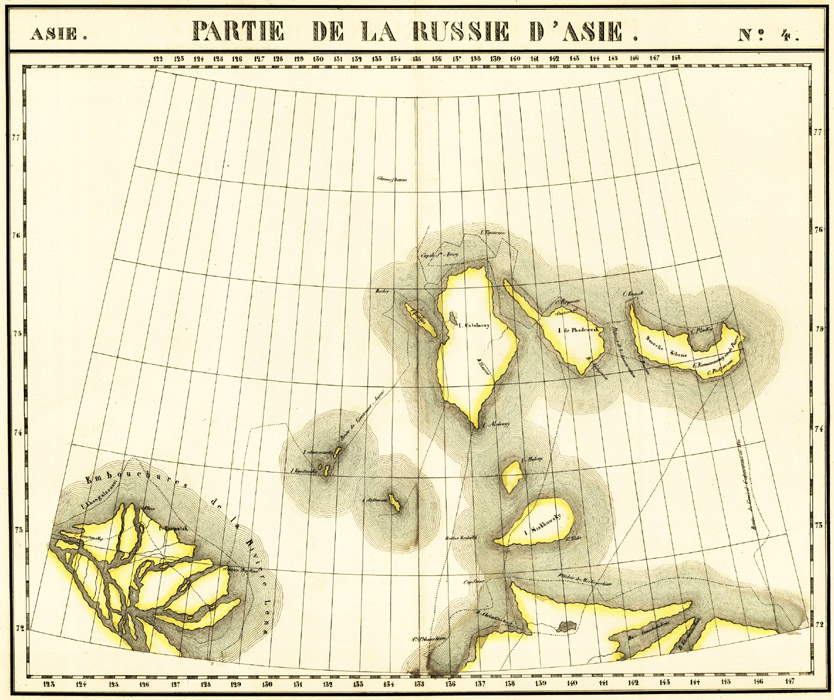
1827 map of Gedenshtrom's 1809–1811 expedition

Later that year, Gedenshtrom arrived in Irkutsk and received his first duty assignment by Minister of Commerce Nikolay Rumyantsev, namely, the exploration of the coastline of the Arctic Ocean. Lacking necessary scientific background, Matvei Gedenshtrom had to study a lot in order to be able to reckon a latitude and longitude of a given location and use scientific equipment in general. Gedenshtrom led the cartographic expedition to explore the New Siberian Islands (together with Yakov Sannikov and land surveyors Pyotr Pshenitsyn and Ivan Kozhevin). The theory about the existence of Sannikov Land somewhere northwest of the Kotelny Island originated during this very expedition. Gedenshtrom established the presence of the Siberian polynya – patches of open water in sea ice at the edge of the drifting ice and continental fast ice. In 1809, Gedenshtrom visited the eastern shores of an island, discovered by merchants Semyon and Lev Syrovatsky three years earlier, and named it New Siberia (this name would be officially endorsed in 1810). Gedenshtrom charted the coastline between the mouths of the rivers Yana and Kolyma. He also made many trips across Yakutia and areas east of the Lake Baikal.

In 1813, Matvei Gedenshtrom was employed by the secretariat of Irkutsk governor. Later on, he was appointed head of district police (исправник) in Verkhne-Udinsk, which did not distract him from scientific research and compiling his mineralogical and botanic collection. Matvei Gedenshtrom was a smart, talented, educated, and kind man, who often helped local peasants with advice and money. However, he was also known to have been an immoral person and a squanderer. He was one of the closest associates of Nikolai Treskin (then-governor of Irkutsk) and made a sizeable fortune on bread purchases assigned to him by the governor's office. In 1819, Mikhail Speransky (governor general of Siberia) paid a visit to Irkutsk as part of his Siberian tour and exposed many instances of official misconduct by local authorities. On 20 February 1820, Matvei Gedenshtrom was removed from his post for his autocratic style of management, embezzlement, extortion, and fraud. Speransky's report on his findings was examined by a special committee, established on 28 July 1821. The committee divided all of the offenders into ten categories. Gedenshtrom found himself in the third category, which meant he could never again be admitted to hold any public posts and had to be banished to an inner guberniya (European Russia). However, it was soon decided not to send him away from Siberia and settle him in Tobolsk. Willing to take advantage of Matvei Gedenshtrom's skills and experience, the administration of Western Siberia managed to obtain permission for him to join the public service. In 1827, Gedenshtrom was allowed to return to European Russia and then employed by the Medical Service Corps (Медицинский департамент) as a section chief. In the 1830s, Matvei Gedenshtrom was appointed a postmaster in Tomsk. Upon his retirement, he moved to a village of Kaidukovaya near Tomsk and spent the rest of his days drinking.

Matvei Gedenshtrom died in extreme poverty on 20 September 1845, at the age of 65. He was interred in Tomsk three days later.

== Works ==
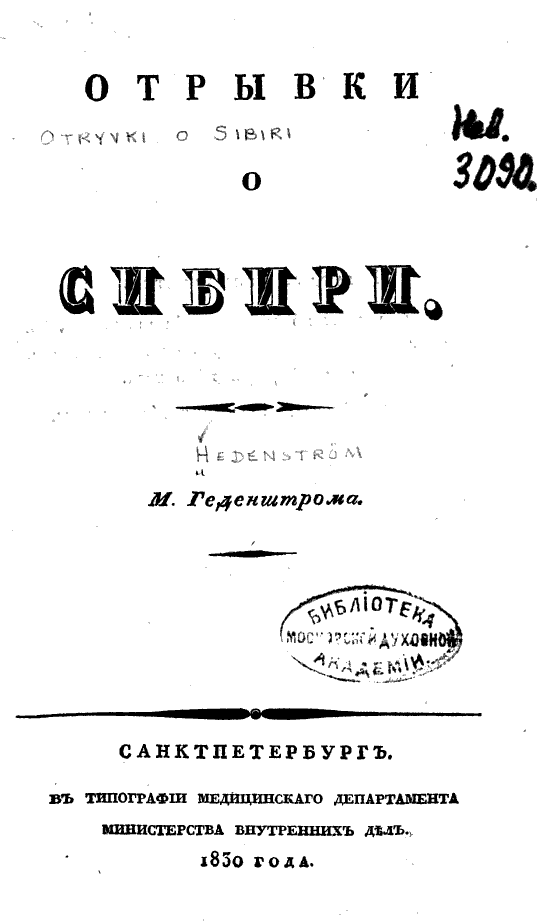
Skehes on Siberia (Отрывки о Сибири; 1830).

Matvei Gedenshtrom published his scientific findings in several separate works and articles:

- Gedenshtrom’s Journey Across the Arctic Ocean and its Islands, Which Lie to the East of the Lena’s Estuary (Путешествие Геденштрома по Ледовитому морю и островам онаго, лежащим от устья Лены к востоку; 1822)
- Description of the Arctic Ocean coastline from the Yana estuary to Cape Baranov (Описание берегов Ледовитого моря от устья Яны до Баранова камня; 1823)
- Notes on Siberia (Записки о Сибири; 1829)
- Skehes on Siberia (Отрывки о Сибири; 1830)
- Islands Between the Lena and Kolyma (Острова между Леною и Колымою; 1838)
- New Siberia (Новая Сибирь; 1838)
- Heads of Unknown Animals Found in Northern Siberia (Головы неизвестных животных, находимых в Северной Сибири; 1838)
- On Baikal (О Байкале; 1839)
- Material for the Description of Siberia (Материалы для описания Сибири; 1841)
- Siberia (Сибирь; 1842).

== Sources ==
- "Геденштрём, Матвей Матвеевич" . Brockhaus and Efron Encyclopedic Dictionary (in Russian). 1906.
