= Dmitry Laptev Strait =

Strait in Russia

Coordinates: 73°N 142°E

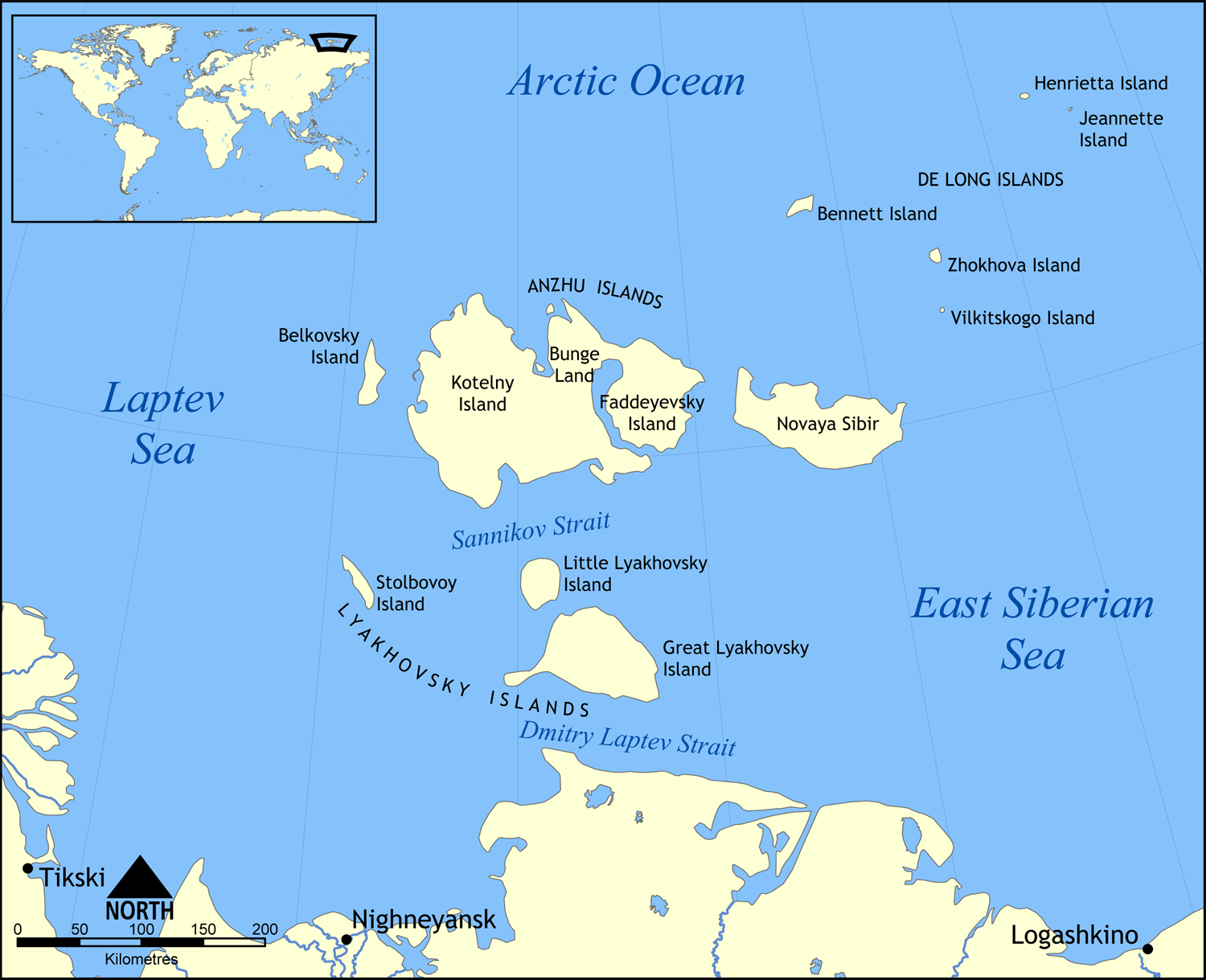
Map showing the location of Laptev Strait

Laptev Strait (Russian: Пролив Дмитрия Лаптева; Yakut: Миитэрэй Лаптев силбэһиитэ, romanized: Mîterey Laptev silbehîte) is a 60 km-wide strait in Russia. It separates Great Lyakhovsky Island of the Lyakhovsky Islands from the mainland, and connects the Laptev Sea in the west with the East Siberian Sea in the east. It is named after Russian explorer Dmitry Laptev.
