= Dmitry Laptev =

Russian Arctic explorer (1701–1771)

Dmitry Yakovlevich Laptev (Russian: Дмитрий Яковлевич Лаптев) (1701 – January [O.S. 10 January] 1771) was a Russian Arctic explorer and Vice Admiral (1762). The Dmitry Laptev Strait is named in his honor and the Laptev Sea is named in honor of him and his cousin, and fellow Arctic explorer, Khariton Laptev.

== Early life ==
Dmitry Laptev was born in the village of Bolotovo, near Velikie Luki, in 1701. A year earlier his cousin Khariton Laptev was born in nearby Bolotovo. He and his cousin were some of the first students at the School of Mathematics and Navigational Sciences in Saint Petersburg, established by Peter the Great. After graduation, he quickly moved up naval ranks and became a ranking naval officer on a number of different vessels.

== Arctic exploration ==
Dmitry Laptev was a lieutenant in the Navy assigned to the Second Kamchatka Expedition in 1735 under Vitus Bering. With the death of the head of the Yakutsk captain Vasili Pronchishchev in 1736, Bering appointed Laptev to be the head of the Yakutsk crew and chart the coast of the Arctic Ocean from the Lena River eastward. With permission from Bering, Laptev returned to Saint Petersburg for the winter. A second attempt the next year similarly failed to reach the eastern fleets of the expedition.

In 1739, Laptev was the commander of an expedition to chart the Anadyr region in the far east of the continent. The expedition went poorly at first and the Yakutsk became trapped by ice very quickly. That winter the crew, led by Laptev, were the first Russians to live amongst the indigenous population of the lower Indigirka River. Villagers from Russkoye Ustye provided crucial food, assistance, and even moved the ship to open water when spring came. Although sea travel never yielded much, Laptev and the crew provided significant mapping of the areas, often through overland treks and expeditions.

After the expedition, he continued his military service in the Baltic Fleet. Laptev was promoted to Vice Admiral rank in 1762, and retired the same year.

== Legacy ==
A cape in the delta of the Lena River and a strait between the Bolshoy Lyakhovsky Island and Asian mainland bear his name. The Laptev Sea is also named after Dmitry Laptev and his cousin, and arctic explorer, Khariton Laptev.
