= Yuri Grigorievich Laptev =

Soviet writer, journalist and actor (1903–1984)

Yuri Grigorievich Laptev (Russian: Юрий Григорьевич Лаптев; 25 October [O.S. 12 October] 1903 - 12 December 1984) was a Soviet writer, journalist and actor. He was a winner of the Stalin Prize in 1949.

Laptev was born in 1903 in Vyatka (now Kirov). In 1927, he graduated from film school, and between 1928 and 1931 he studied at the Moscow Higher Technical School. He worked as in the Soviet film industry in various capacities, as actor, editor and assistant director. Writing from the 1920s onwards, his first story was published in 1942. He was an active participant in the Great Patriotic War from its inception in 1941; from 1942 he was a special correspondent for the Krasny Sokol newspaper of the 18th Air Army. His war experiences provided the fuel from short stories such as "Portrait of a Pilot" which was translated into English for an anthology of Soviet short stories published by Penguin. More broadly, his work deals with themes such as the Russian village before and after the war, life in collective farms, etc. These inspired some of his best-known stories such as "Zarya" and "Siberian Stitches".

Laptev worked at the Gorky Literary Institute until 1975. He died in Moscow in 1984.
