= Khariton Laptev =

Russian naval officer and Arctic explorer

Khariton Prokofievich Laptev (Russian: Харитон Прокофьевич Лаптев; 1700–1763) was a Russian naval officer and Arctic explorer.

== Biography ==
Khariton Laptev was born in a gentry family, Laptev family which was a branch of the Lopukhin family, in the village of Pokarevo near Velikiye Luki (in the southern part of today's Pskov Oblast), just a year before his cousin Dmitry Laptev was born in the nearby village of Bolotovo.

Khariton Laptev started his career in the Russian Navy as a cadet in 1718. By 1730, he was already in charge of a military ship, and in 1734 participated in the siege of Gdańsk.

In 1739–1742, Khariton Laptev led one of the parties of the Second Kamchatka expedition. Together with Semion Chelyuskin, N. Chekin, and G. Medvedev, Laptev described the Taimyr Peninsula from the mouth of the Khatanga River to the mouth of the Pyasina river and discovered a few of the islands in the area. After the expedition, he participated in the creation of the "General Map of the Siberian and Kamchatka Coast", and continued his military service in the Baltic Fleet. The sea coastline of the Taimyr Peninsula, a cape on the Chelyuskin Peninsula and other landmarks bear his name. The Laptev Sea was also named after him (and his cousin Dmitry Laptev). The 1962-built icebreaker Ledokol-3 was renamed Khariton Laptev in 1966 in his honor.
