= Yury Laptev =

Yury Konstantinovich Laptev (Russian: Юрий Константинович Лаптев; born 1960) is an adviser to the President of Russia.

== Biography ==
He graduated from the N.A. Rimsky-Korsakov Leningrad State Conservatory as an opera singer in 1983 and as an opera director in 1987.

Since 1988, he has been a soloist and director at the Mariinsky Theatre and at the same time has held the posts of head of the directing department at the Mariinsky Theatre, senior lecturer at the musical theatre department and dean of the vocal faculty at the Leningrad Conservatory.

In 2002, he was awarded the title of Merited Artist of Russia.

On April 16, 2004, he was appointed adviser to the President.

== Sources ==
- Kremlin.ru

This article incorporates material from the website of the President of Russia and is used under the Creative Commons and Attribution 4.0 International , 8 April 2015 - on Attribution 3.0 Unported Licence.
