= Cape Yevgenov =

Cape on Krylov Peninsula, Antarctica

Cape Yevgenov (69°0′S 156°36′E) is an ice-covered cape midway along the northeast side of Krylov Peninsula, forming the west entrance to Lauritzen Bay, Antarctica. Photographed by U.S. Navy Operation Highjump (1946–47), Soviet Antarctic Expedition (1957–58), and ANARE (Australian National Antarctic Research Expeditions) (1959). Named by Soviet Antarctic Expedition after Russian hydrographer Nikolay I. Yevgenov (1888–1964).
