= Bolshoy Lyakhovsky Island =

Island in Lyakhovsky Islands, Russia

Native name: Большой Ляховский остров
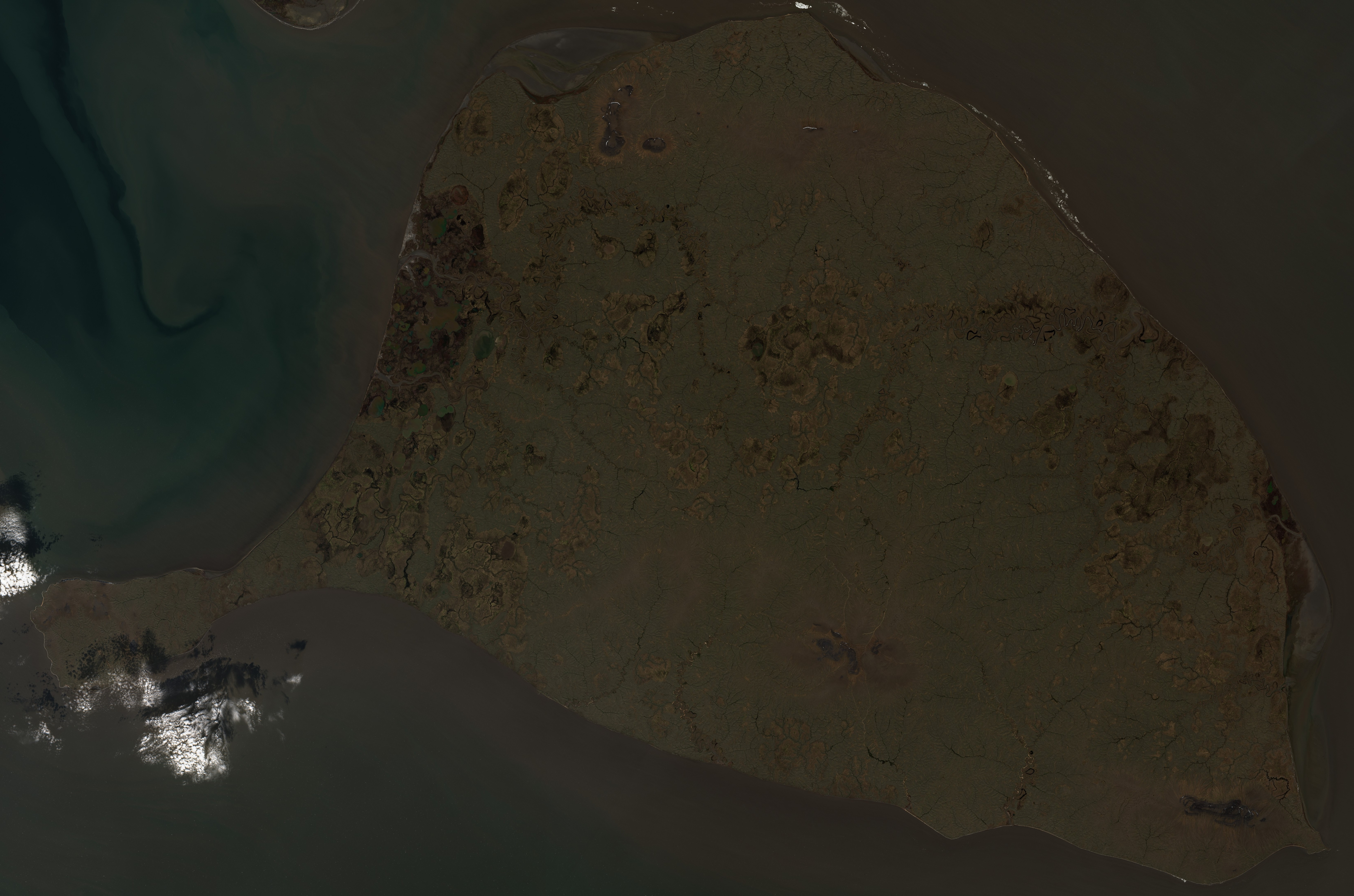
- Satellite image of the island

- Location within Russia

Geography
- Location: between the Laptev Sea and East Siberian Sea
- Coordinates: 73°30′N 142°00′E
- Archipelago: New Siberian Islands
- Area: 5,157 km^{2} (1,991 sq mi)
- Highest elevation: 270 m (890 ft)
- Highest point: Emy Tas

Administration
- Russia

Demographics
- Population: 0 (2017)

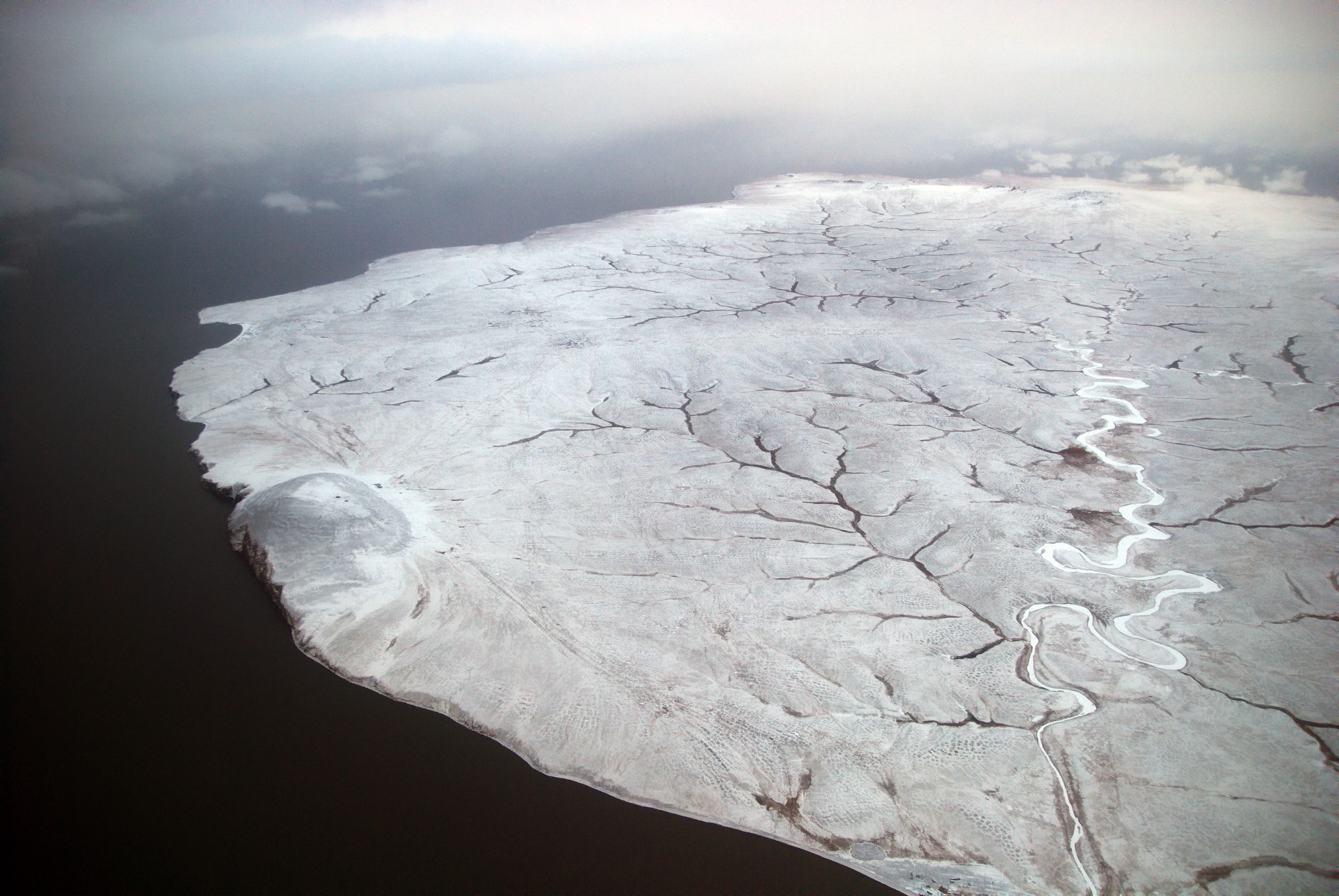
The Kigilyakh Peninsula

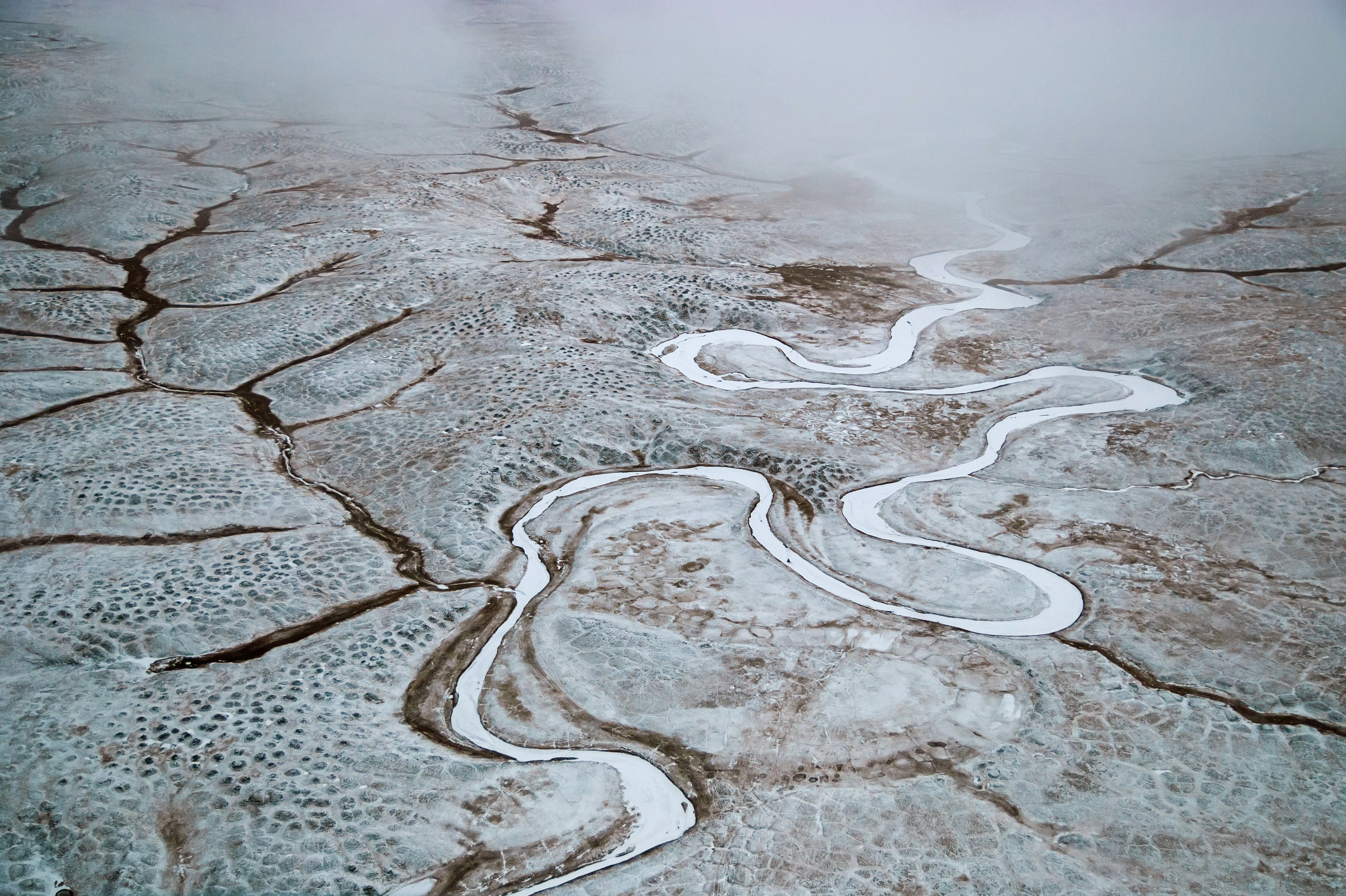
The Malakatyn River, Bolshoy Lyakhovsky Island.

Bolshoy Lyakhovsky Island (Russian: Большой Ляховский остров), or Great Lyakhovsky, is the largest of the Lyakhovsky Islands belonging to the New Siberian Islands archipelago between the Laptev Sea and the East Siberian Sea in northern Russia. It has an area of 5,156.6 km^{2} (1,991.0 sq mi), and a maximum altitude of 311 m (1,020 ft) (Emy Tas).

The peninsula projecting towards the west of the island is the Kigilyakh Peninsula (Poluostrov Kigilyakh).

Off Bolshoy Lyakhovsky Island's southwestern cape lies a small islet called Ostrov Khopto-Terer.

The Lyakhovsky Islands are named in honour of Ivan Lyakhov, who explored them in 1773.

== Geology ==
Bolshoy Lyakhovsky Island consists of highly folded and faulted Precambrian metamorphic rocks and turbidites; Mesozoic turbidites and igneous rocks; and Cenozoic sediments. Exposed in southeastern part of this island, the older Precambrian. Early Proterozoic, metamorphic rocks consist of schists and amphibolites. Small exposures of Late Proterozoic schistose, quartzose sandstones and phyllitic, sericite-quartz schist (turbidites) also occur in the southeastern part of Bolshoy Lyakhovsky Island. The bulk of this island consists of Late Jurassic to Early Cretaceous turbidites composed of interbedded fine-grained sandstones, thinly bedded siltstones, and argillites. The Precambrian and Late Jurassic to Early Cretaceous rocks are intruded by Late Cretaceous granites and granodiorites.

A blanket of unconsolidated Cenozoic sediments blankets most of Bolshoy Lyakhovsky Island. These sediments include Paleocene to Eocene colluvial, alluvial, and deltaic gravels, sands, clays, and coals and Oligocene to Miocene alluvial, lacustrine, deltaic, and nearshore marine sands and clays that contain beds and lenses of gravel. Overlying these sediments are Pliocene to Pleistocene colluvial, alluvial, and nearshore marine sands, silts, and clays that contain occasional gravel layers. The nearshore marine sediments contain the shells of marine mollusks and pieces of lignitized wood. Thick permafrost characterized by massive ice wedges has developed in these sediments. Contrary to the interpretations of Baron von Toll and earlier geologists, glacial tills and related sediments are completely absent within Bolshoy Lyakhovsky Island.

In Soviet times on the Kigilyakh Peninsula Vladimir Voronin, then in charge of the Bolshoy Lyakhovsky Polar Station, was shown a large standing rock which had been heavily eroded and which gave name to the peninsula. The word Kigilyakh means "stone man" in the Yakut language.

== Quaternary geology ==
The southern sea cliffs of Bolshoy Lyakhovsky Island, which were first studied by Baron von Toll, expose a complex sequence of fossiliferous Late and Middle Pleistocene floodplain, eolian, lake, and solifluction sediments cemented by permafrost. In the 1990s and 2000s, a Russian-German multidisciplinary team, which included the Alfred Wegener Institute for Polar and Marine Research and Permafrost Institute, Russian Academy of Sciences, studied the cryolithology, geochronology, ground ice geochemistry, paleobotany, paleontology, sedimentology, and stratigraphy of these sediments. The age of these sediments were studied in great detail using radiocarbon dating of bones, ivory, and plant remains; optically stimulated luminescence dating of bone-bearing sediments; and uranium-thorium dating of associated peat.

The oldest sediments exposed in the southern sea cliffs of Bolshoy Lyakhovsky Island consist of a layer of rocky, yellowish to greenish colored sediment. This layer is a thick Paleogene weathering crust (paleosol) that has developed within Permian sandstone. This paleosol has been largely modified by periglacial processes and development of ice wedges periodically during the Pleistocene. These deeply weathered sediments are unfossiliferous and characterized by the presence of weathering products like kaolinite and montmorillonite. Saalian sediments uncomfortably overlie this paleosol.

The oldest known Pleistocene sediments exposed in the southern sea cliffs of Bolshoy Lyakhovsky Island consist of Saalian sediments, which accumulated between 200,000 and 120,000 years ago. The lower part of these sediments consist of ice-rich, silty and silty-sandy sediments that accumulated as a Saalian ice complex between 200,000 and 170,000 years ago. They contain pebbles, peat inclusions, and peat horizons. The presence of ice belts, reticulated ice interlayers, and wide, round-shouldered ice wedges indicate that permafrost formed in these sediments as they accumulated. The lower part of this unit contains the pollen of sparse grass-sedge vegetation, which reflects a stadial environment. The upper part of this ice-rich unit contains pollen associated with dense grass-dominated tundra, which is indicative of interstadial environments. The upper part of the Saalian sediments, which lie uncomfortably on the eroded surface of the lower Saalian ice complex deposits, consists of well-sorted fine-grained sand that contains pollen characteristic of sparse grass-sedge dominated interstadial vegetation and less ground ice. These loess-like sediments accumulated within floodplains and lakes. As they accumulated between 170,000 and 120,000 years ago, ice wedge polygons formed in these sediments as the result of extremely cold and dry conditions.

Elsewhere along the coast of Bolshoy Lyakhovsky Island, the sea cliffs expose pre-Eemian floodplain and lake sediments at their base. Eemian lake sediments fill depressions, i.e. ice wedge casts and thermokarst lakes, which developed by the surficial thawing during Eemian interglacial climates of Saalian ice-wedges and other permafrost. In some locations, the Eemian lake deposits are thicker and laterally continuous enough to form a complete blanket overlying older sediments. The Eemian sediments contain fossils indicative of an interglacial environment.

At many localities along the sea cliffs, typically over 10 metres (33 ft) of Early Weichselian lacustrine and loess-like floodplain deposits overlie the Eemian and pre-Eemian sediments. These sediments consist of fine-grained, well-sorted sands with rare grass and sedge pollen. They contain ice wedge polygon systems that formed during the Early Weichselian stadial, about 100,000 to 50,000 years ago, as the result of extremely cold and dry conditions.

Typically, 15 to 20 metres (49 to 66 ft) of Middle Weichselian ice complex deposits, which consist largely of aeolian sediments that accumulated 50,000 to 28,000 years ago, overlie the Early Weichselian sediments. These sediments contain pollen typical of the mammoth tundra-steppe environments and large ice wedge polygon systems. These sediments accumulated within a swampy, poorly drained habitat, which existed under an extremely cold continental climate. A zone of peaty deposits within this ice complex accumulated during a Middle Weichselian interstadial about 40,000 to 30,000 years ago. The Middle Weichselian deposits underlie the upland surfaces of this part of Bolshoy Lyakhovsky Island.

Within the southern sea cliffs of Bolshoy Lyakhovsky Island, Late Weichselian sediments of the Last Glacial Maximum have not been found. The Ice Complex deposits associated with this period of time appear have been eroded and covered by Holocene deposits.

Where thermokarst depressions have formed by melting of the permafrost, they are filled by Holocene solifluction and lake sediments. These depressions formed as the result of the thawing of ice wedges and other permafrost during the Late Pleistocene-Holocene transition about 12,000 to 10,000 years ago. Lacustrine sediments filling these depressions contain a record of the Allerød warming, Younger Dryas cooling, and other climatic events. Holocene fluvial and solifluction deposits underlie valleys of streams cut into underlying Pleistocene sediments. Solifluction deposits, which were created by melting of the underlying permafrost, veneer the surface of the uplands. New ice wedge polygon systems later formed in these sediments during the Late Holocene as result of pronounced climatic cooling, which only recently has reversed in the last couple of hundred years.

Because of the formation of permafrost in these sediments and their depositional environments, prehistoric bone, shell, and plant material are well preserved and abundant. As noted above, later researchers found that the bone- and wood-bearing sediments described by Baron von Toll consist of both glacial, Saalian and Weichselian, and interglacial, Eemian and Holocene, sediments. For example, Baron von Toll's alder tree was found in Eemian sediments, which are about 114 to 130 thousand years old. The vertebrate fossils occur in sediments that range in age from 114,000 to less than 8,000 BP.

Baron Eduard von Toll was among the first to report in detail about the abundance of Pleistocene fossils found within Bolshoy Lyakhovsky Island. Under a peat composed of water mosses covering what he described as "perpetual ice", now known to be permafrost, Baron von Toll found fragments of willow and the bones of post-Neogene mammals. He also reported having found in a frozen, sandy clay layer and lying on its side, a complete tree of Alnus fruticosa 15 to 20 ft (4.6 to 6.1 m) in length, including roots, with leaves and cones adhering. Unfortunately, his reports have been frequently either misrepresented or badly garbled by popular accounts of his findings. For example, various authors, i.e. Dr. Digby and Dr. Kropotkin misreport this tree as being 90 feet (27 m) high. Other publications, i.e. Fingerprints of the Gods and Earth's Shifting Crust not only incorrectly state that this alder tree is 90 feet (27 m) high, but also they also repeat fictional claims from unreliable sources that this tree was either a "fruit tree" or "plum tree" and had "green leaves"and green fruit" still attached. Lacking modern radiocarbon dating techniques, Baron von Toll assigned this tree and other fossils to single "mammoth period". As discussed above, more recent geologic research and radiometric dating of these fossils and the sediment containing them has found that they are from different layers of Middle to Late Pleistocene glacial and interglacial sediments.

== Climate ==
The Cape Shalaurova meteorological station, which lies on the southeast coast of Bolshoy Lyakhovsky Island, at 73° 11' N 143° 56' E provides climatic data for this island. The mean precipitation is 184 millimetres per year (7.2 in/year) as calculated for a 7-year period between April 1994 and September 2000 as calculated from National Oceanic and Atmospheric Administration data. The heaviest precipitation, about two-thirds of the yearly total, occurs between June and September. As calculated from the same data for the same period of time, the mean temperature at Cape Shalaurova is −13.6 °C (7.5 °F). January is the coldest month with a mean temperature of −31.0 °C (−23.8 °F) and August is the warmest month with a mean temperature of 2.4 °C (36.3 °F). Mean daily temperatures range as low as −40.5 °C (−40.9 °F) and as high as 9.4 °C (48.9 °F).

Climate data for Mys Shalaurova
Month	Jan	Feb	Mar	Apr	May	Jun	Jul	Aug	Sep	Oct	Nov	Dec	Year
Daily mean °C (°F)	−31.2 (−24.2)	−31.5 (−24.7)	−28.6 (−19.5)	−20.9 (−5.6)	−8.9 (16.0)	−0.3 (31.5)	2.5 (36.5)	2.2 (36.0)	−0.8 (30.6)	−11.5 (11.3)	−23.4 (−10.1)	−28.7 (−19.7)	−15.1 (4.8)
Average precipitation mm (inches)	8.8 (0.35)	6.9 (0.27)	6.4 (0.25)	6.5 (0.26)	14.3 (0.56)	17.1 (0.67)	24.6 (0.97)	24.8 (0.98)	19.9 (0.78)	17.5 (0.69)	12.6 (0.50)	8.9 (0.35)	168.3 (6.63)
Average precipitation days (≥ 1.0 mm)	2.0	1.6	1.5	2.2	3.0	4.1	5.2	5.8	6.4	5.6	3.5	1.8	42.7
Mean monthly sunshine hours	0	25	175	277	197	207	214	120	56	26	0	0	1,297
Source: NOAA

== Vegetation ==
The vegetation of Bolshoy Lyakhovsky Island is a mixture of rush/grass, forb, cryptogam tundra, cryptogam herb barren, and sedge/grass, moss wetland. The rush/grass, forb, cryptogam tundra covers the bulk of Bolshoy Lyakhovsky Island. It consists mostly of very low-growing grasses, rushes, forbs, mosses, lichens, and liverworts. These plants typically cover about 40–80 percent of the surface of the ground. The soils are typically moist, fine-grained, and often hummocky. The cryptogam herb barren consists of dry to wet barren landscapes with scattered, herbs, lichens, mosses, and liverworts. Sedges, dwarf shrubs, and peaty mires are normally absent. These plants form a sparse (2–40%) and low-growing plant cover that often occurs as dark streaks on the otherwise barren lands, composed largely of bryophytes and cryptogamic crusts. Sedge/grass, moss wetlands, which occur on the northwest and southeast ends of Bolshoy Lyakhovsky Island, consist of wetland complexes dominated by sedges, grasses, and mosses. These wetlands occupy low, perennially wet parts of the landscape.

== See also ==
- List of islands of Russia
