= Nord Island (Kara Sea) =

Nord Island Ostrov Nord
Native name: остров Норд
- Location within Nordenskiöld Archipelago

Geography
- Location: Kara Sea
- Coordinates: 76°48′11″N 97°50′3″E
- Archipelago: Nordenskiöld Archipelago
- Length: 10 km (6 mi)
- Width: 6 km (3.7 mi)
- Highest elevation: 75 m (246 ft)

Administration
- Russia
- Federal subject: Krasnoyarsk Krai

Demographics
- Population: uninhabited

Nord Island (Russian: остров Норд, ostrov Nord) is an island of the Nordenskiöld Archipelago in the Kara Sea, off the coast of Siberia.

Administratively this island belongs to the Krasnoyarsk Krai Federal subject of Russia and is part of the Great Arctic State Nature Reserve, the largest nature reserve of Russia.

== Geography ==
Nord Island is located in the northeastern area of the Nordenskiöld Archipelago south of the Kolomeitsev Islands. It is part of the Vostyochnyye Islands (Восточные острова) 'Eastern Islands', subgroup of the archipelago. The closest islands are the Yevgeny Fyodorov Islands to the east. The island is irregular in shape, it is 10 kilometers (6.2 mi) long and has a maximum width of 6 kilometers (3.7 mi). There is a 75 metres (246 ft) high hill in the northeast of the island that has a triangulation station at the top. The southernmost headland is Cape Foka (мыс Фоки).

The climate in the archipelago is severe and the sea surrounding the island is covered with fast ice in the winter and often obstructed by pack ice even in the summer.

== History ==
In 1900, the islands of the Nordenskiöld Archipelago were surveyed by Russian Navy Captain Fyodor Matisen during the first wintering of the Russian polar expedition of 1900–02, but this island remained unnamed.

In 1930 the island was named after ship "Nord" of the Russian Hydrographic Department. Cape Foka, the southern point of the island, was named in 1939 after Georgy Sedov's schooner "Svyatoy Muchenik Foka" (Saint Martyr Foka)
