= Shpanberg Island =

Island in the Nordenskiöld Archipelago, Russia

Native name: остров Шпанберга
- Location within Nordenskiöld Archipelago

Geography
- Location: Kara Sea
- Coordinates: 76°41′24″N 96°0′0″E
- Archipelago: Nordenskiöld Archipelago
- Length: 5.2 km (3.23 mi)
- Width: 4.2 km (2.61 mi)
- Highest elevation: 67 m (220 ft)

Administration
- Russia
- Federal subject: Krasnoyarsk Krai

Demographics
- Population: uninhabited

Shpanberg Island (Russian: остров Шпанберга, romanized: ostrov Shpanberga), sometimes Spanberg Island, is an island of the Nordenskiöld Archipelago in the Kara Sea, off the coast of Siberia in Russia.

Administratively, the island belongs to Krasnoyarsk Krai, a federal subject of Russia, and is part of the Great Arctic State Nature Reserve, the largest nature reserve of Russia.

== Geography ==
Shpanberg Island is located in the central area of the archipelago on the southern side of the Lenin Strait. The island is 5.2 kilometers (3.2 mi) long and has a maximum width of 4.2 kilometers (2.6 mi). Cape Razvodnoy (мыс Разводной) is the headland at its SE end and Cape Ustalosti (мыс Усталости) at its NE end.

It is part of the Pakhtusov Islands (острова Пахтусова) subgroup of the Nordenskiöld Archipelago. The closest islands are Petersen Island 2.3 kilometers (1.4 mi) to the southeast, Dobrynia Nikitich Island to the SW and Pakhtusov Island 2.3 kilometers (1.4 mi) to the west.

The climate in the archipelago is severe and the sea surrounding the island is covered with fast ice in the winter and often obstructed by pack ice even in the summer.

== History ==
In 1900, the islands of the Nordenskiöld Archipelago were explored by Russian Navy Captain Fyodor Matisen, who named most of them. The survey was done during the first wintering of the Russian polar expedition of 1900–02 on behalf of the Imperial Russian Academy of Sciences led by geologist Baron Eduard Von Toll aboard ship Zarya.

This island was named after the Dano-Russian naval officer and explorer Martin Spanberg, who served as one of Vitus Bering's lieutenants in both Kamchatka expeditions, performed the first Russian diplomatic mission to Japan, and helped accelerate Russian occupation of the Kurils in series of voyages in 1738, 1739, and 1742.
