= Novyy Island (Kara Sea) =

Island off the coast of Siberia

Novyy Island Ostrov Novyy
Native name: остров Новый
- Location within Nordenskiöld Archipelago

Geography
- Location: Kara Sea
- Coordinates: 76°33′31″N 95°32′41″E
- Archipelago: Nordenskiöld Archipelago
- Length: 2 km (1.2 mi)
- Width: 1.6 km (0.99 mi)
- Highest elevation: 19 m (62 ft)

Administration
- Russia
- Federal subject: Krasnoyarsk Krai

Demographics
- Population: uninhabited

Novyy Island (Russian: остров Новый, ostrov Novyy, meaning "New Island") is an island of the Nordenskiöld Archipelago in the Kara Sea, off the coast of Siberia.

Administratively this island belongs to the Krasnoyarsk Krai Federal subject of Russia and is part of the Great Arctic State Nature Reserve, the largest nature reserve of Russia.

== Geography ==
Novyy Island is located in the central area of the archipelago on the southern side of the Radzeyevsky Strait. The island is 2 kilometers (1.2 mi) long and has a maximum width of 1.6 kilometers (0.99 mi). There are wetlands in the middle of the island.

It is the northernmost island of the Vilkitsky Islands (острова Вилькицкого) —also known as 'Dzhekman Islands'— subgroup of the Nordenskiöld Archipelago. The closest islands are Chabak Island, the largest island of the group, 2 kilometers (1.2 mi) to the southwest and Strizhev Island 2.2 kilometers (1.4 mi) to the southeast.

The climate in the archipelago is severe and the sea surrounding the island is covered with fast ice in the winter and often obstructed by pack ice even in the summer.

== History ==
In 1900, the islands of the Nordenskiöld Archipelago were explored by Russian Navy Captain Fyodor Matisen, who named most of them. The survey was done during the first wintering of the Russian polar expedition of 1900–02 on behalf of the Imperial Russian Academy of Sciences led by geologist Baron Eduard Von Toll aboard ship Zarya.
