= Kolomeytsev =

Kolomeytsev or Kolomeitsev (Russian: Коломейцев) is a Russian masculine surname, its feminine counterpart is Kolomeytseva or Kolomeitseva. It may refer to

- Aleksandr Kolomeytsev (born 1989), Russian football player
- Nikolai Kolomeitsev (1867–1944), Russian Arctic explorer
  - Kolomeytsev Islands in the Kara Sea, named after Nikolai
