= Hovgaard Island (Kara Sea) =

Island of the Nordenskiöld Archipelago in the Kara Sea

Hovgaard Island Ostrov Khovgarda
Native name: остров Ховгарда
- Location within Nordenskiöld Archipelago

Geography
- Location: Kara Sea
- Coordinates: 76°21′50″N 95°5′36″E
- Archipelago: Nordenskiöld Archipelago
- Length: 3 km (1.9 mi)
- Width: 0.9 km (0.56 mi)
- Highest elevation: 13 m (43 ft)

Administration
- Russia
- Federal subject: Krasnoyarsk Krai

Demographics
- Population: uninhabited

Hovgaard Island (Russian: остров Ховгарда, ostrov Khovgarda) is an island of the Nordenskiöld Archipelago in the Kara Sea, off the coast of Siberia.

Administratively this island belongs to the Krasnoyarsk Krai Federal subject of Russia and is part of the Great Arctic State Nature Reserve, the largest nature reserve of Russia.

== Geography ==
Hovgaard Island is located in the southwestern area of the archipelago on the northern side of the Matisen Strait. The island is 3 kilometers (1.9 mi) long and has a maximum width of little less than 1 kilometer (0.62 mi) in its southern part.

It is part of the Vilkitsky Islands (острова Вилькицкого) —also known as 'Dzhekman Islands'— subgroup of the Nordenskiöld Archipelago. The closest islands are Dzhekman Island 3.4 kilometers (2.1 mi) to the northwest and Ovalnyy Island 2.3 kilometers (1.4 mi) to the northeast. Hovgaard Island lies about 8 kilometers (5.0 mi) north of Nansen Island and less than 11 kilometers (6.8 mi) northwest of the NW point of Taymyr Island across the Matisen Strait.

The climate in the archipelago is severe and the sea surrounding the island is covered with fast ice in the winter and often obstructed by pack ice even in the summer.

== History ==
In 1900, the islands of the Nordenskiöld Archipelago were explored by Russian Navy Captain Fyodor Matisen during the Polar Expedition on behalf of the Imperial Russian Academy of Sciences led by geologist Baron Eduard Von Toll aboard ship Zarya.

This island was named after Andreas Hovgaard, a Polar explorer and officer of the Danish Navy who led an expedition to the Kara Sea on steamship Dijmphna in 1882-83.
