= Russian polar expedition of 1900–1902 =

Expedition to study the Arctic

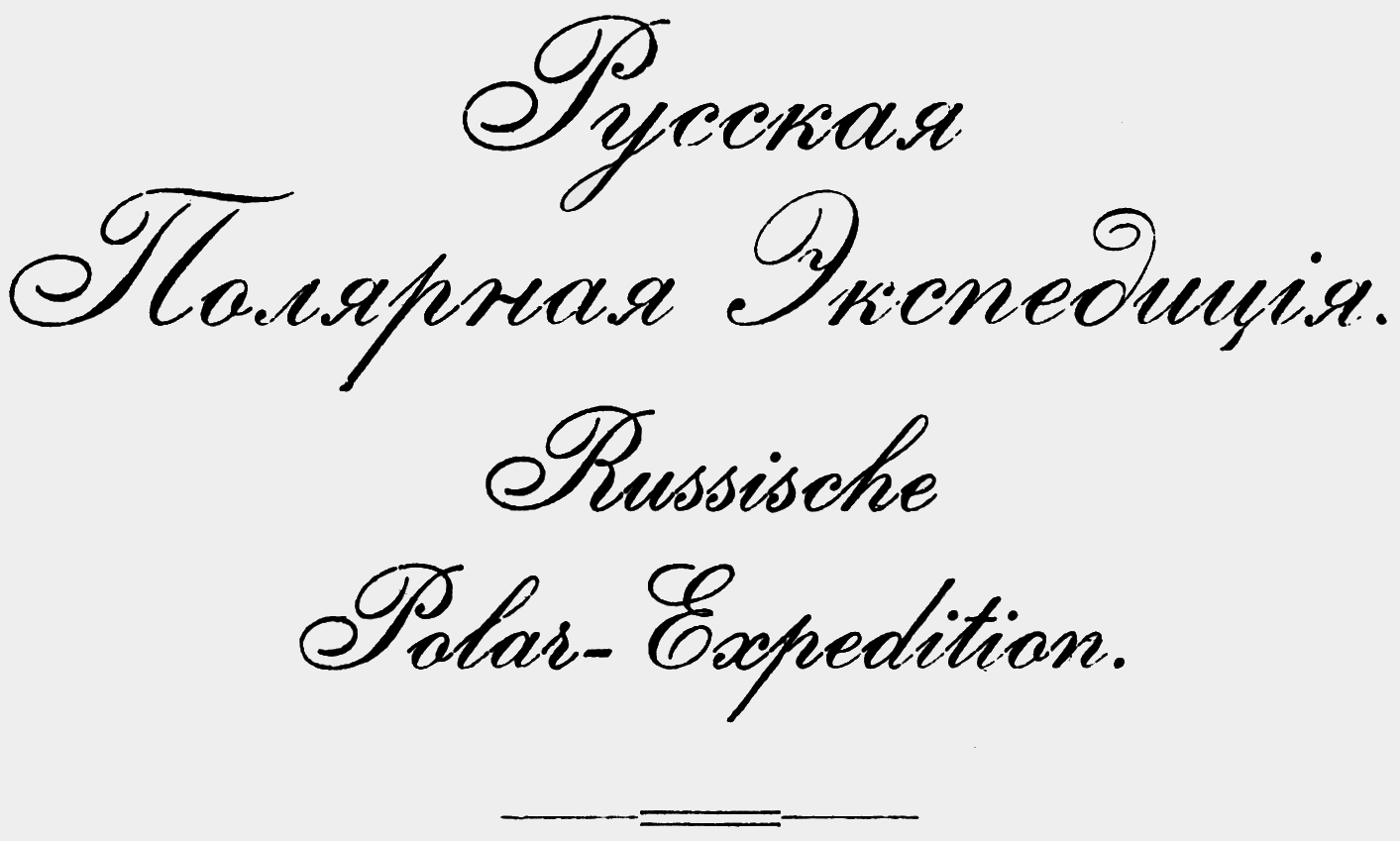
- Date: 21 June [O.S. 8 June] 1900 – December 1902
- Location: Russian Empire
- Participants: 20 people, including Eduard von Toll, Fyodor Matisen, Nikolai Kolomeitsev, Alexander Kolchak, Nikifor Begichev, Stepan Rastorguyev and Mikhail Brusnev
- Deaths: 7 people including Eduard Toll

The Russian polar expedition of 1900–1902 was commissioned by the Saint Petersburg Academy of Sciences to study the Arctic Ocean north of the New Siberian Islands and search for the legendary Sannikov Land. It was led by the Baltic German geologist and Arctic explorer Baron Eduard von Toll on the ship Zarya. Toll and his three assistants vanished in late 1902 while exploring Bennett Island. One of the key members of the expedition was Alexander Kolchak, then a young researcher and lieutenant of the Russian Navy, and later a leader of the White movement and anti-Bolshevik government of Russia during the civil war period. Kolchak also led the rescue mission to find Toll and his crew.

== Background ==
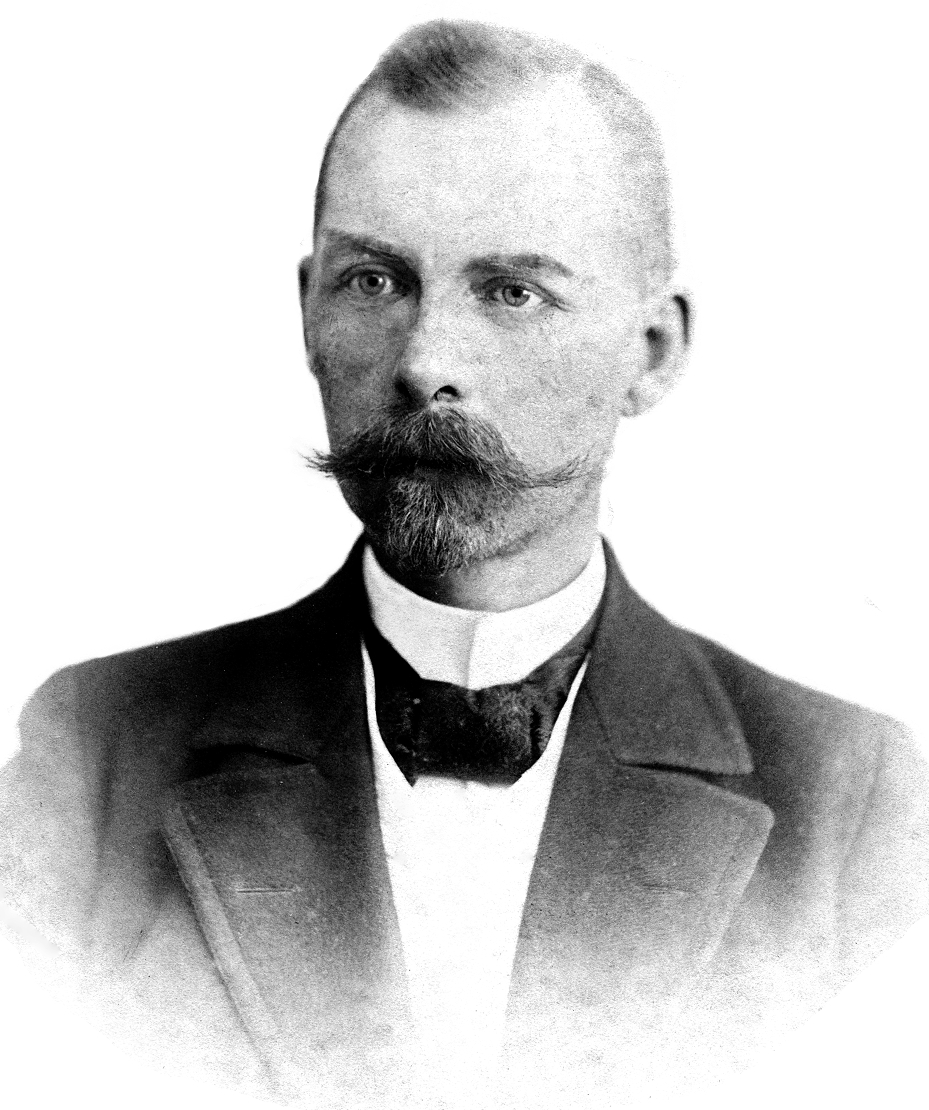
Baron von Toll

During 1884–1886, Toll assisted Alexander von Bunge in his exploration of the New Siberian Islands and the Arctic Ocean shores from the mouth of the Lena river to the mouth of the Yana. Toll then found mammoth bones on Kotelny and Bolshoy Lyakhovsky Islands and coal on New Siberia.

On a clear day, Toll spotted, from Kotelny Island, vague outlines of an unknown island located some 100 km (62 mi) north-east, with steep shores and columnar mountains. He believed this to be the legendary Sannikov Land, which, at the time, was marked on maps by a dashed line.

Upon returning from the New Siberian Islands in 1893, Toll began a vigorous campaign for a marine expedition to the area, which included a detailed presentation to the Academy of Sciences. He convinced the Academy to explore the areas east of Taymyr Island and the potential sea route to the Bering Strait, arguing that Americans were pursuing the same goal and should not be given priority. The project was delayed due to its high costs, and only on 31 December 1899 was approved by Nicholas II, who also appointed Toll as the expedition chief.

== Planning and preparation ==
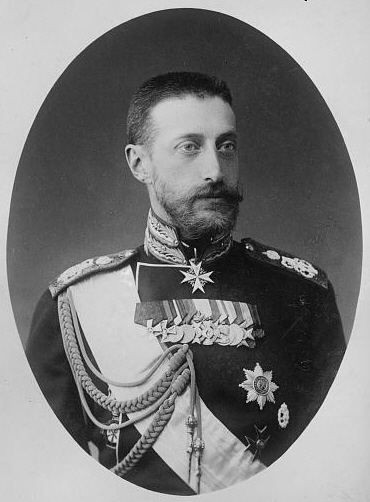
Grand Duke Konstantin Konstantinovich of Russia, patron of the expedition

Grand Duke Konstantin played an important role in organizing the expedition, which is why his portrait was placed in the messdeck of Zarya. Being a naval officer, Konstantin showed great understanding and interest in the expedition and helped raise its finances from 240,000 to 509,000 rubles. The expedition was well supplied, and its preparations went without unnecessary delays.

According to the final plan, after surveying New Siberian Islands the expedition was to sail eastward, circumnavigate the Cape Dezhnev and arrive in Vladivostok. It was supposed to split into two groups, with the smaller auxiliary group responsible for delivery of provisions to the New Siberian Islands.

The expedition ship was built in 1873 in Norway and then used for seal hunting near Greenland under the name Harald Harfager. It was a sailing barque with a steam engine similar to Fram and SS Vega. Upon recommendation from Fridtjof Nansen it was purchased for 60,000 rubles and renamed Russian: Zarya (Dawn).

The ship was sent to the shipyard of Colin Archer in Larvik to be heavily modified in order to deal with the ice. Colin Archer, the Norwegian shipbuilder, had designed and built Fritdjof Nansen's ship Fram, which in 1896 had returned unscathed from its long drift in the northern polar ocean during Nansen's "Farthest North" expedition, 1893–96. Archer had also fitted out Southern Cross for the Southern Cross Expedition in 1897 to become a polar ship. Archer strengthened Zarja heavily with internal frames and beams, and deckhouses were added and modified. The rig was changed to barkentine (square sail on foremast only). In October 1899 the ship was certified by Norwegian authorities for a three-year expedition in the Arctic.

Equipment for the hydrological studies was ordered in England, Sweden and Russia. The hydrological preparation was started too late, and Kolchak, who was responsible for the work, struggled to complete them in time. He also visited Nansen in Norway for consultation and training, and then traveled to Moscow and Arkhangelsk where he recruited three crew members. One of them, Semyon Evstifeev was later praised by Toll as his best sailor.

== Crew ==
The scientific part of the expedition consisted of the following personnel:

- Baron Eduard Toll – expedition head, geologist and zoologist.
- Konstantin Vollosovich – head of the assisting group of 11 men, geologist.
- Nikolai Kolomeitsev – lieutenant and captain of Zarya. He previously took part in explorations of the White Sea at the mouth of Yenisei River
- Fyodor Matisen – lieutenant, and assistant of Kolomeitsev. He was a member of the 1899 expedition to Svalbard.
- Alexander Kolchak – lieutenant, hydrograph, hydrologist, magnetologist, hydrochemist and cartologist.
- Alexei Byalynitsky-Birulya – chief zoologist from the Zoological Museum of the Russian Academy of Sciences.
- Friedrich Seeberg – astronomer and magnetologist.
- Herman E. Walter – medical doctor and bacteriologist. In 1899, he took part in the expedition that explored lands near Murmansk and Novaya Zemlya.
- Victor Katin-Yartsev – medical doctor in political exile. He replaced Walter who died of a heart attack on 21 December 1901.
- Mikhail Brusnev – engineer in political exile.
- O. F. Tsionglinsky – student in political exile.

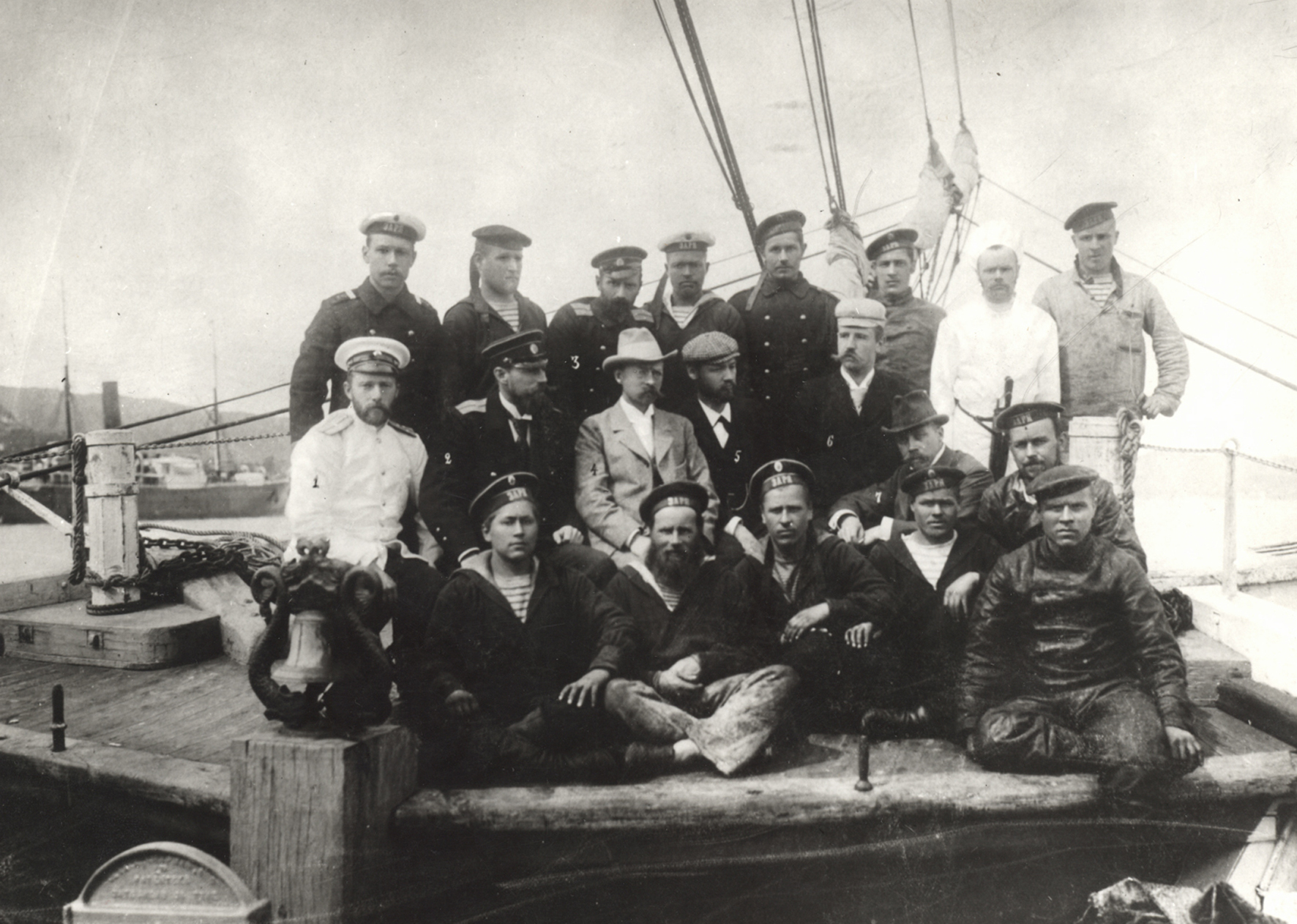
Expedition members aboard Zarya. Top row, third from left: Kolchak. Second row: Kolomeitsev, Matisen, Toll, Walter, Seeberg and Byalynitsky-Birulya

The supporting team included:

- Nikifor Begichev – boatswain.
- Nikolai Bezborodov – sailor.
- Semyon Evstifeev – sailor.
- Vasily Gorokhov – sailor
- Ivan Klyug – fireman
- Ivan Malygin – sailor, later replaced by musher Stepan Rastorguyev
- Trifon Nosov – fireman
- Eduard Ogrin – chief engineer
- Nikolai Protod'iakonov – sailor.
- Gavriil Pyzyrev – fireman
- Aleksei Semyashkin – sailor, later replaced by musher Peter Strizhev.
- Eduard Shirvinsky – engineer
- Sergei Tolstov – sailor.
- Foma Yaskevich – cook.
- Vasily Zheleznyakov – helmsman

In early April 1900, the entire team gathered in the Norwegian town of Larvik, where Zarya was being fitted by the shipbuilder Colin Archer. From there they sailed to Oslo to fetch scientific equipment and a supply of coal and then to Saint Petersburg. On 29 May, Nicholas II visited the ship, and helped to resupply it with coal. A few days later the ship was visited by the Grand Duke Konstantin.

== Expedition ==
=== First navigation ===
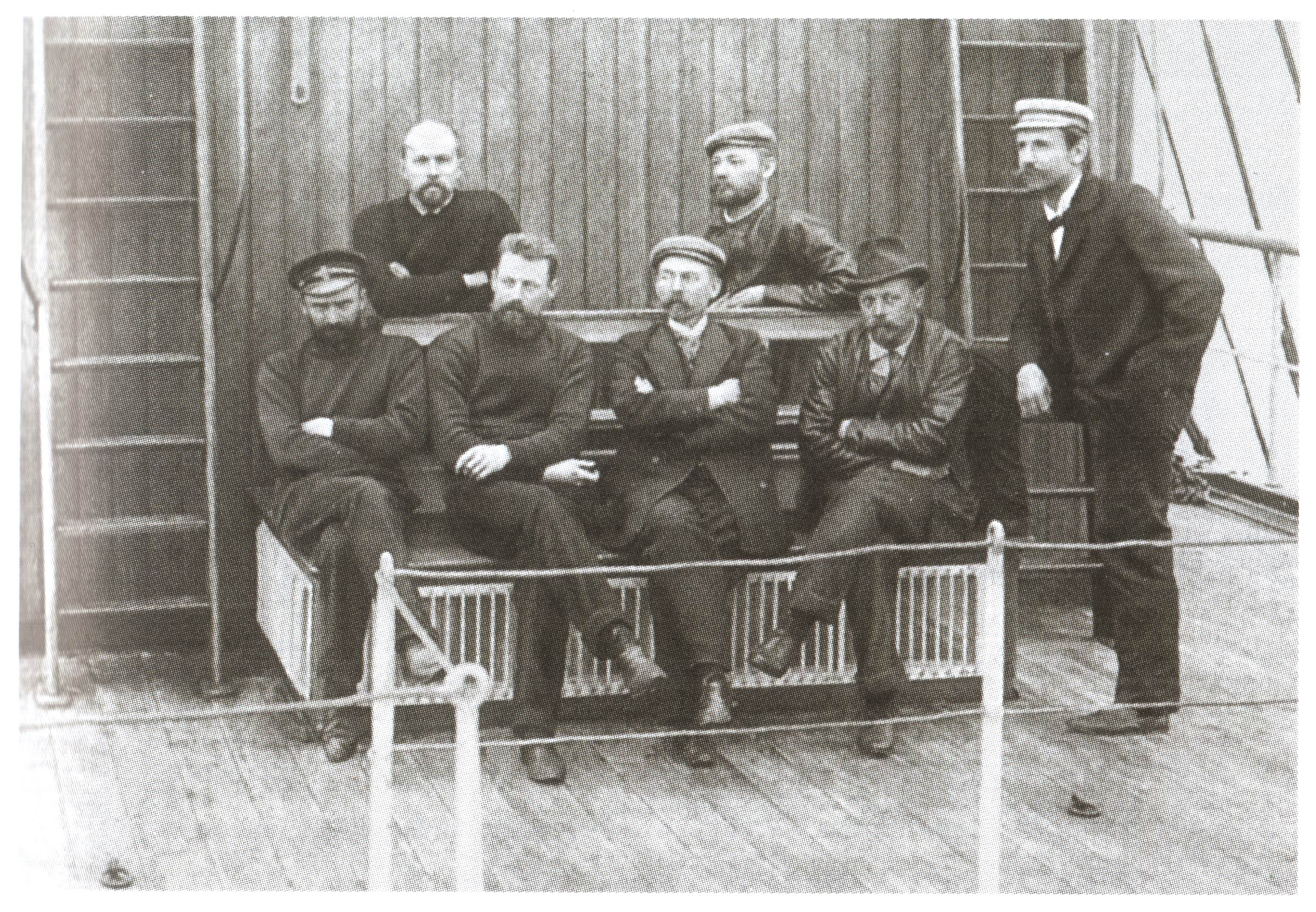
Members of the expedition on Zarya

On 8 June 1900, Zarya left St. Petersburg heading for Kronstadt and the Gulf of Finland, where it had a minor problem. While it was being fixed in Tallinn, Toll left the ship, crossed the gulf, and went by train to Oslo to consult with Nansen, and then to Bergen to meet Zarya. From Bergen to Tromsø the ship was guided by a specially hired local pilot. In Tromsø, while the crew was waiting for the coal resupply from England, there were two major incidents: Malygin got arrested after a drunken brawl, and Semyashkin contracted a venereal disease and was found unfit for his duties by Dr. Walter.

The day after passing North Cape, on 11 July 1900 Zarya approached Polyarny to replenish its coal. There Toll and Kolomeitsev had a major quarrel over their roles on the expedition, which ended in Kolomeitsev asking to be to relieved from his duties. Their command styles were very different: Toll longed for comradeship and treated sailors as equals, while Kolomeitsev tried to keep a distance from the men and imposed harsh punishments for unruly behavior. Kolomeitsev thought that Toll's attitude undermined his authority as commander of Zarya.

After unsuccessful mediation attempts, Kolchak likewise offered his resignation. This had the effect of easing the conflict, as Toll could not afford to lose two of his key assistants. On the morning of 12 July the expedition took onboard 60 sled dogs and two mushers Peter Strizhev and Stepan Rastorguyev, Malygin's and Semyashkin's replacements.

On 18 July Zarya left Kola Bay, and the next Kolchak and Byalynitsky-Birulya conducted their first hydrological and zoological observations. Kolchak was helped by Begichev and Zheleznyakov who expressed interest in his studies.

By 22 July Zarya passed Kolguyev Island, and on 25 July approached Vaygach. There Toll had an arranged to meet a schooner which had been engaged to deliver coal for the expedition from Arkhangelsk to Yugorsky Strait. Not seeing the schooner, Toll decided not to wait for it, but attempt to reach Cape Chelyuskin as soon as possible. This would allow the expedition to winter on the eastern Taymyr and explore the poorly mapped areas nearby. The next day, Zarya met ice fields and was forced to deviate from its route southwards.

On 30 July outlines of Sibiryakov Island appeared on the horizon. Toll decided to make a stop there to rest and perform maintenance on the boilers. A group of polar bears were encountered and a few killed for food.

On 5 August, the expedition changed its route towards Taimyr Peninsula. From then on it had to make stops as long as 19 days being stranded in icefields and shallows. On the night of 3 September it saw its first aurora. Soon sailors noticed a light ahead, and decided that it was icebreaker Yermak, but astronomer Seeberg realized that it was Venus.

=== Wintering in Taimyr ===
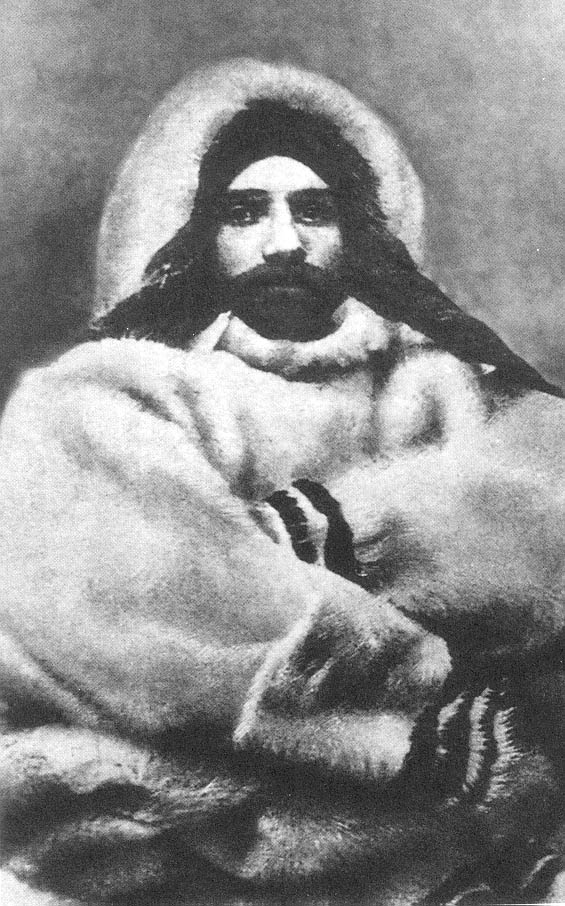
Kolchak wintering in Taimyr in 1900–1901

On 22 September 1900 the expedition stopped for wintering in the Bay of Colin Archer. The event was marked by a party, with champagne and brandy for the officers and beer for the sailors. Soon after, Zarya became completely frozen into the ice. A meteorological station was set up on the ice, using sails for the walls. The station had a phone connection with the ship which was used to send observation results every hour. Unlike Nordenskiöld and Nansen, who managed to pass Cape Chelyuskin before wintering, Toll failed to reach eastern Taymyr. This would affect the entire course of the expedition, and eventually lead to its tragic outcome. The prevailing south-westerly winds drive into the ocean the warm waters of large Siberian rivers, which in turn brings heavy icefields back towards the shore. To save time, Toll planned to get to the East Taymyr through tundra on dog sleds, crossing Cape Chelyuskin in early 1901. This task would be impossible without a resupply on route. He decided to organize such resupply before the polar night, and on 10 October, together with Kolchak, Nosov and Rastorguyev, left Zarya on two heavily loaded sleds.

The group moved for 3–4 hours a day, in a harsh weather with temperatures below −30 °C outside and −20 °C in the tent. On 15 October they reached the Gafner Bay and left a stock of food there. Shortly before heading back to the base, Toll saw a partridge and a reindeer moving south, (he assumed) from a more northern land. This event reinvigorated Toll in his search for Sannikov Land.

The polar night arrived only a day after the group returned to the base on 19 October. It brought cold weather, with temperatures well below −30 °C outdoors, around 0 °C in the meteorological station, and some 8 °C in the messdeck. Most time was spent on reading books about polar expeditions, and in February 1901 Kolchak made a presentation about the Great Northern Expedition, whereas Birulya described the natural environment at the South Pole. During the wintering four people showed symptoms of scurvy, but those were suppressed by efficient intervention of Dr. Walter. Toll sent Kolomeitsev and Rastorguyev to search for the mouth of the Taymyr River and the settlements of Dixon and Golchikha, during which they encountered difficulties due to snowstorms and lack of a proper map. As a result, the pair failed to locate the Taymyr River, and ultimately split from the main expedition, traveling more than 800 km and reaching the Dudinka River (tributary of the Yenisei) by May 1901. These trips resulted in significant corrections of the local maps and in the discovery of the Upper Taymyr River.

==== Undiscovered northern lands ====
On 23 February, Toll sent Matisen and Strizhev to survey northwards. The pair crossed the Nordenskiöld Archipelago from south to north; on reaching the 77° mark, they turned to the west, and then returned due to the perceived shortage of dog food. Matisen was very close to discovering Maly Taymyr Island, for which he only had to travel an extra 150 kilometers north-east from the northernmost point of his journey, and some 200 km north he would have discovered Severnaya Zemlya. Toll was dissatisfied with the results and a few days later sent Matisen to a new journey with Nosov. This time Matisen mapped two new islands of the Nordenskiöld Archipelago, but turned back after meeting ice ridges.

==== Expedition to Cape Chelyuskin ====
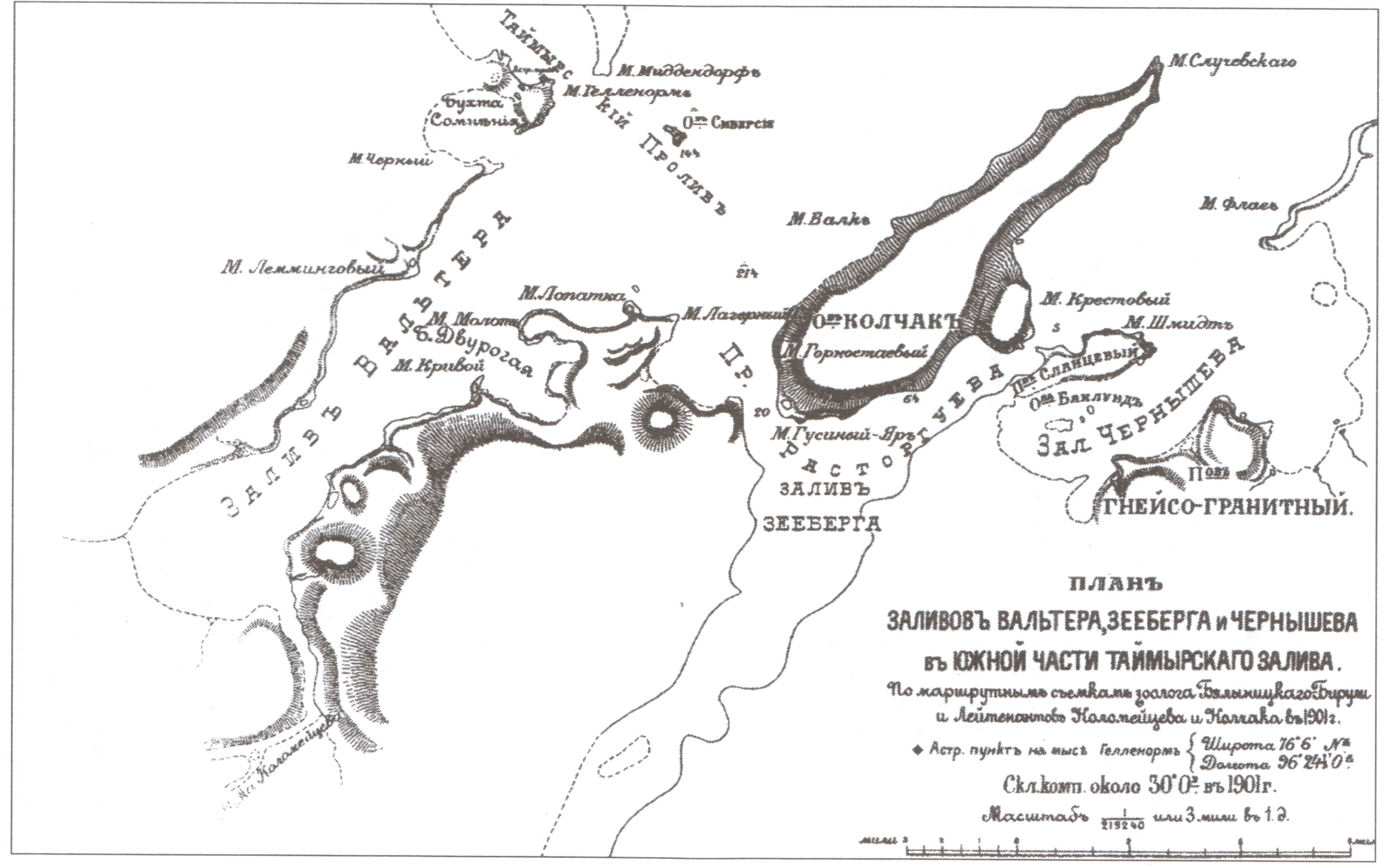
Map of the area around Kolchak Island compiled from the expedition data

The next trip, to Cape Chelyuskin, Toll decided to carry out himself, together with Kolchak and two mushers, Nosov and Zheleznyakov. Because of the lack of dogs, all four men often pulled the sledges themselves. Locating the cache at Gafner Bay, left the previous autumn, proved difficult as it was covered by some eight meters of snow. After a week of digging, Kolchak and Toll abandoned their attempts to reach the cache and decided to survey the area. Exhausted, they returned to Zarya on 18 May, having spent 41 days away from the ship in harsh weather. After that trip, Kolchak changed his attitude to dogs from ignorance to great care. The friendly relations between Kolchak and Toll strengthened, and in 1901 Toll named one of the islands that they discovered after Kolchak. Kolchak himself named another island and a cape after his bride, Sophia Feodorovna Omirova, who was waiting for him in St. Petersburg.

Kolchak's next expedition from the ship nearly cost him his life. When he, together with Byalynitsky-Birulya and two sailors, decided to lower a dredge into a crack in the ice, they were surprised by an angry polar bear. A dog came to their rescue and distracted the bear while the sailors ran to their camp for their rifles.

==== In search of the Taimyr River ====
Canned soup recovered in 1974 from the cache of Toll and Kolchak at the Gafner Bay

The sea ice began to melt, but the exit from the bay where Zarya spent the winter was still blocked. Toll decided to explore the area in a kayak, accompanied by Seeberg and several sailors. In August they found the mouth of Taymyr River, 100 kilometers further north than shown on their maps. They also managed to recover some of the supplies left at the Gafner Bay. In 1974, a Soviet expedition examined the remaining food at that location and found that oatmeal was perfectly preserved in permafrost after more than 70 years. The expedition decided to continue the food-science experiment inadvertently started by Toll, keeping some of his cans in the original storage conditions and to be reexamined in 1980, 2000 and 2050.

Toll returned to Zarya on 10 August, just in time. Two days later the ship started shifting in ice towards the open sea.

=== Second navigation ===
Routes of expeditions by Toll (1901) and Kolchak (1903)

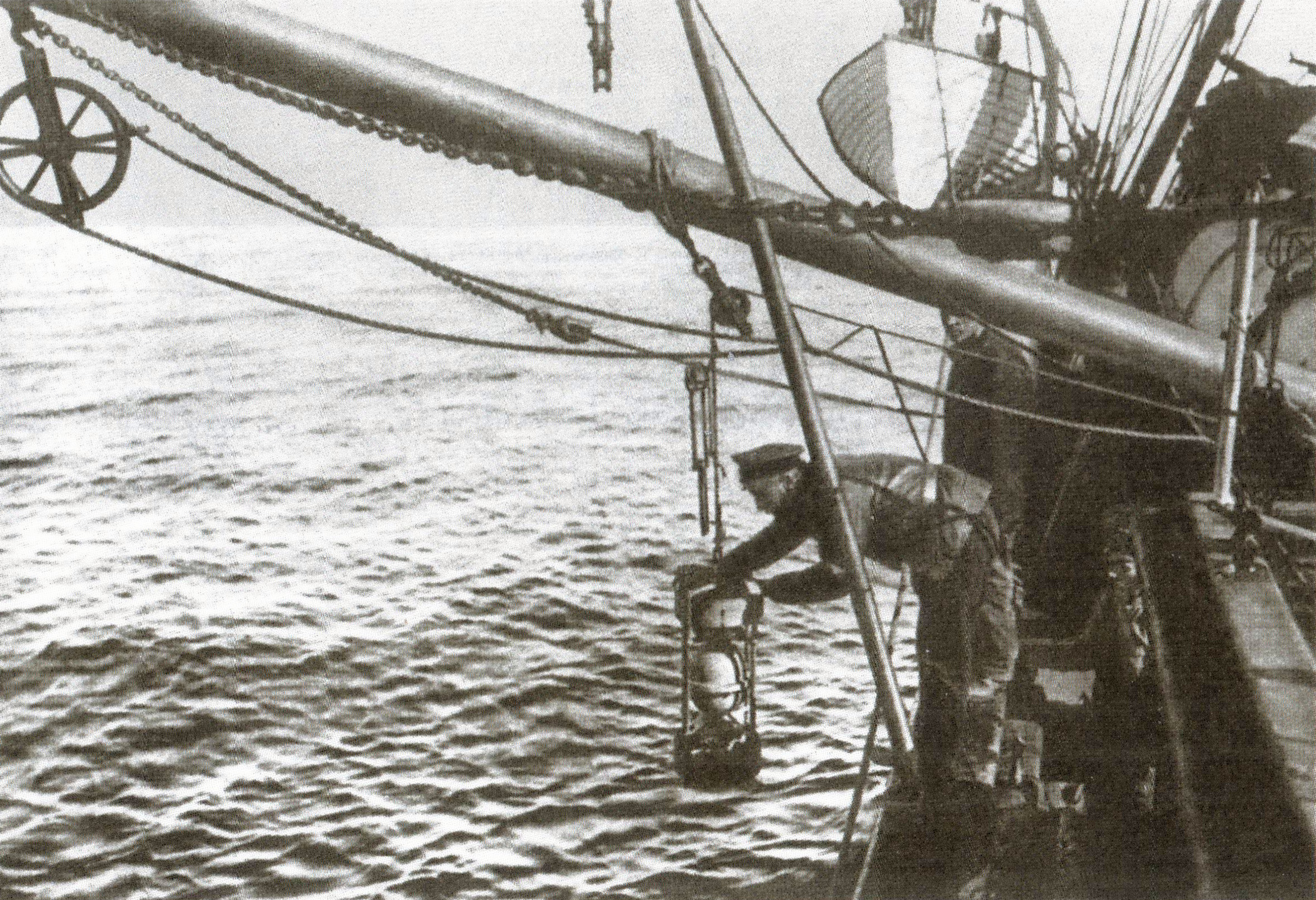
Kolchak during hydrographical measurements

On 19 August 1901 Zarya crossed the longitude of Cape Chelyuskin. Kolchak took instruments for measuring latitude and longitude and went in a kayak to the shore. Toll followed him in another boat, which was nearly overturned by a suddenly surfacing walrus. After conducting measurements and building a cairn, expedition members took a group photograph on its background. By noon, the group returned to Zarya, and after giving a salute in honor of Chelyuskin, continued their voyage. Kolchak and Seeberg processed the measurements and found that the visited cape was a little east of the Cape Chelyuskin. They named the new cape after the ship.

After the departure of Kolomeitsev, all watch shifts were shared by two officers, Matisen and Kolchak. This forced Kolchak to reduce his scientific work to the most essential measurements.

After passing Cape Chelyuskin, Zarya entered uncharted waters, as Nordenskiöld and Nansen sailed much farther south. By the order of Toll the ship was directed to the expected location of Sannikov Land.

A violent storm hit the ship on the night of 29 August, flooding the quarterdeck with icy water and overturning a large wooden table in the messdeck. It was followed by fog, and when it dissipated, a rocky headland of Bennett Island appeared in front of the travelers. Toll noted in his diary that it was possible to pass 10 times near Sannikov Land without noticing it in a fog.

On 3 September Zarya entered Nerpichye Bay and tried to break through to a small harbor that was protected by shallow water from incoming icefields. On the banks sailors spotted a small house made of driftwood and the team of Vollosovich that was awaiting them. Fighting with strong currents, wind and ice the schooner ran aground several times and only on 5 September reached the harbor.

=== Second wintering ===
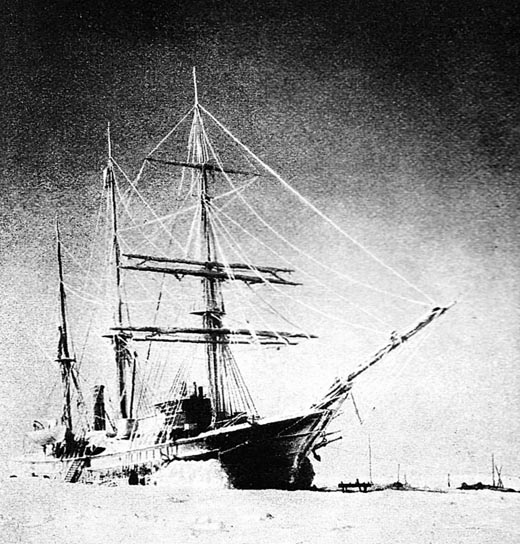
Wintering Zarya

Using the driftwood brought by the Lena River, expedition members soon erected a magnetic observation station, a weather station and a banya near the house of Vollosovich. While running from hot banya to cool down in snow, a common practice of the time, Kolchak got inflammation of the periosteum accompanied by a high fever.

The failure to find Sannikov Land was a strong disappointment for Toll, who called the voyage "Exploration of the Sannikov Land and other islands". The passage to Vladivostok through the Bering Strait seemed unrealistic and the results of the expedition too small for him. He decided to send Matisen in search of Sannikov Land in February–March 1902, after the polar day set in, and upon his return, explore Sannikov Land, if found, or Bennett Island if not.

Evenings in the messdeck were spent in philosophical debates, and their most fervent participants Kolchak and Birulya, were often sent to cool down onshore. Those trips made the two men close friends, and resulted in an observation by Kolchak that in extreme cold, when a river locally freezes to the bottom, the incoming water would flow on top of ice until the entire stream freezes.

On 21 December 1901, Dr. Walter died of a heart attack during his duty at the weather station. He was feeling unwell the weeks before but tried to hide that. He was replaced by Dr. Katin-Yartsev, who arrived in late April 1902. Vollosovich developed neurasthenia, and Toll allowed him to leave the expedition. He briefly accompanied him on the shore between 15 and 30 January 1902, and upon returning to Zarya, sent Matisen for his planned explorations. On the continent, Toll learned that Rastorguyev, who was supposed to rejoin Zarya, went to Chukotka with an American expedition, signing a lucrative contract. Previously, in early February Toll received a note from the Academy of Sciences instructing him to limit the expedition to explorations of New Siberian Islands and terminate it in the mouth of the Lena.

Matisen returned on 17 April 1902, reporting that 7 miles away from Kotelny Island he ran into a polynya and turned back. On 29 April, Birulya with three Yakuts was sent to New Siberia to assist the planned voyage of Zarya to Bennett Island. In early May, Kolchak and Strizhev surveyed Belkovsky Island and run into polynyas in the northern and western directions.

=== Navigation in 1902 ===
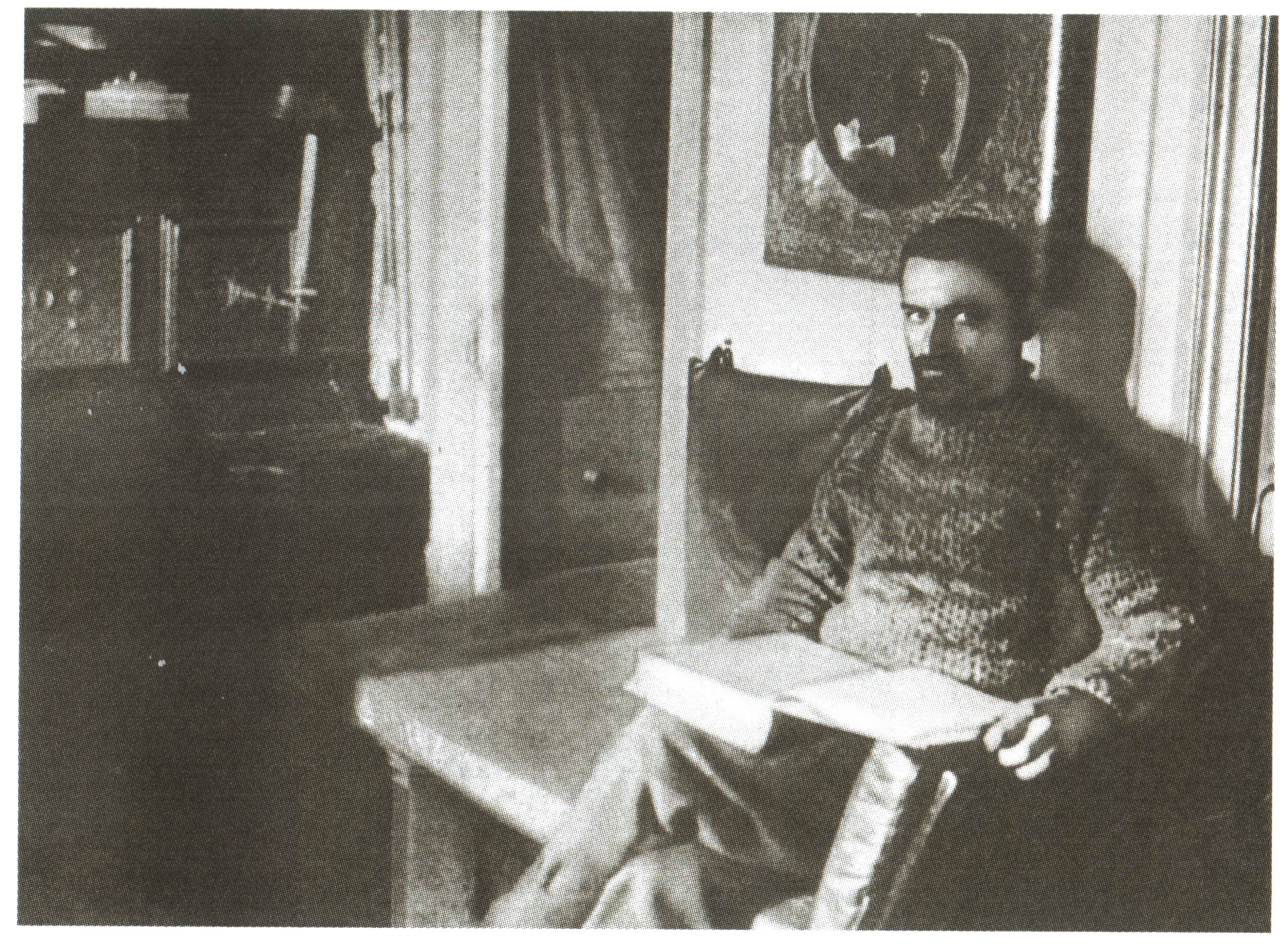
Kolchak in the messdeck of Zarya

In the evening of 23 May 1902, Toll, Seeberg, Protod'iakonov and Gorokhov took provision for two months and departed on three sleds. Toll left an envelope "to be opened if the expedition will be deprived of its ship and will return to the mainland without me, or in the event of my death", which contained a letter assigning Matisen as the expedition head. Toll traveled along the northern shores of Kotelny Island and Faddeyevsky Peninsula, and then crossed over to the island of New Siberia and stopped at Cape Vysoky. Four days later, using an ice floe and a canoe, his group moved to Bennett Island, with provisions running low. Kolchak later wrote that Toll knew this adventure was extremely risky, and took it believing in his luck.

On 1 July, with the help of explosives Zarya was freed from ice and left drifting north-east. When the polar day ended on 31 July, the ship was nearby the Lyakhovsky Islands, and on 3 August it was returned to the wintering location. On 8 August it was directed to Bennett Island. According to Katin-Yartsev, there was little hope to reach Bennett, and the main goal was to collect the group of Birulya on New Siberia. When the passage between Belkovsky and Kotelny island became blocked with ice, Matisen tried to skirt Kotelny from the south to pass through the Blagoveschensky Strait to Cape Vysoky. In the shallow waters of the strait the ship was damaged and started leaking, after which Matisen decided to get around New Siberia from the south. He succeeded, and on 16 August Zarya sailed in full swing to the north, only to get blocked by ice on the next day. By 23 August the ship ran low on coal, and would not make a return journey even if it managed to reach Bennett, which was some 90 miles away. Matisen decided to turn south, abandoning Toll. Later Kolchak and most other polar explorers and historians did not criticize that decision, believing that Matisen had no choice.

Meanwhile, the St. Petersburg Academy of Sciences asked merchant A. I. Gromova, the owner of polar steamship Lena, to rescue the main part of the expedition and offered her the ownership of Zarya in return. On 25 August 1902 Zarya entered Buor-Khaya Gulf and approached Tiksi Bay. Lena had not arrived yet, and Matisen tried to bring the ship into the delta of the Lena River. Kolchak with two boatswains performed depth measurements over three days, but could not find a safe passage. Lena arrived on 30 August, and fearing the freeze-up, its captain ordered them to leave in three days. Zarya was abandoned in a quiet corner in the bay, and Brusnev was left behind in the village of Kazachye to wait for Toll, and travel to New Siberia if Toll did not appear by 1 February.

Lena departed on 2 September and by 30 September reached Yakutsk, where expedition members disembarked and proceeded to Irkutsk on horses. During the trip, Nikolai Bezborodov accidentally shot Trifon Nosov, who later died from sepsis. In early December Kolchak reached St. Petersburg, and began organizing an expedition to rescue Toll.

=== Fate of the groups of Toll and Birulya ===
Toll arrived at Bennett Island on 21 July 1902 facing a dilemma: set a basecamp and engage in hunting to replenish his food supplies, or rely on the arrival of Zarya and proceed with explorations. Toll chose the latter. He left records that the island has an area of about 230 square kilometers and is elevated 457 meters above mean sea level. He described its fauna and geological structure and noted the presence of bones of mammoth and other Quaternary animals. The fauna included bears, walruses and a herd of 30 reindeer, with bird flocks flying over from north to south.

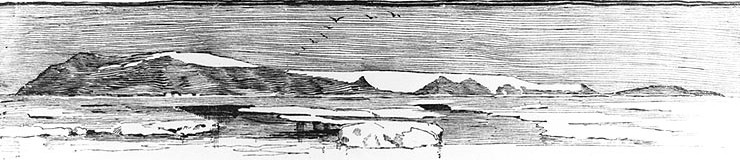
Bennett Island (1881)

The group had built a shelter from driftwood which was also to be used for fuel. For reasons unknown, they did not store food and abandoned the remains of killed bears and reindeer. When it became clear that the Zarya would not be coming, the group was already low on ammunition, with only 30 shotgun rounds found at the shelter, and the reindeer had already left the island.

On 26 October 1902, the group headed south, leaving a note that all were healthy, and provision would suffice for 14–20 days. Kolchak failed to find any traces of the men on Bennett or New Siberia Islands, and assumed they met their fates while navigating between them. Meanwhile, Birulya's group left New Siberia and reached the mainland by December 1902.

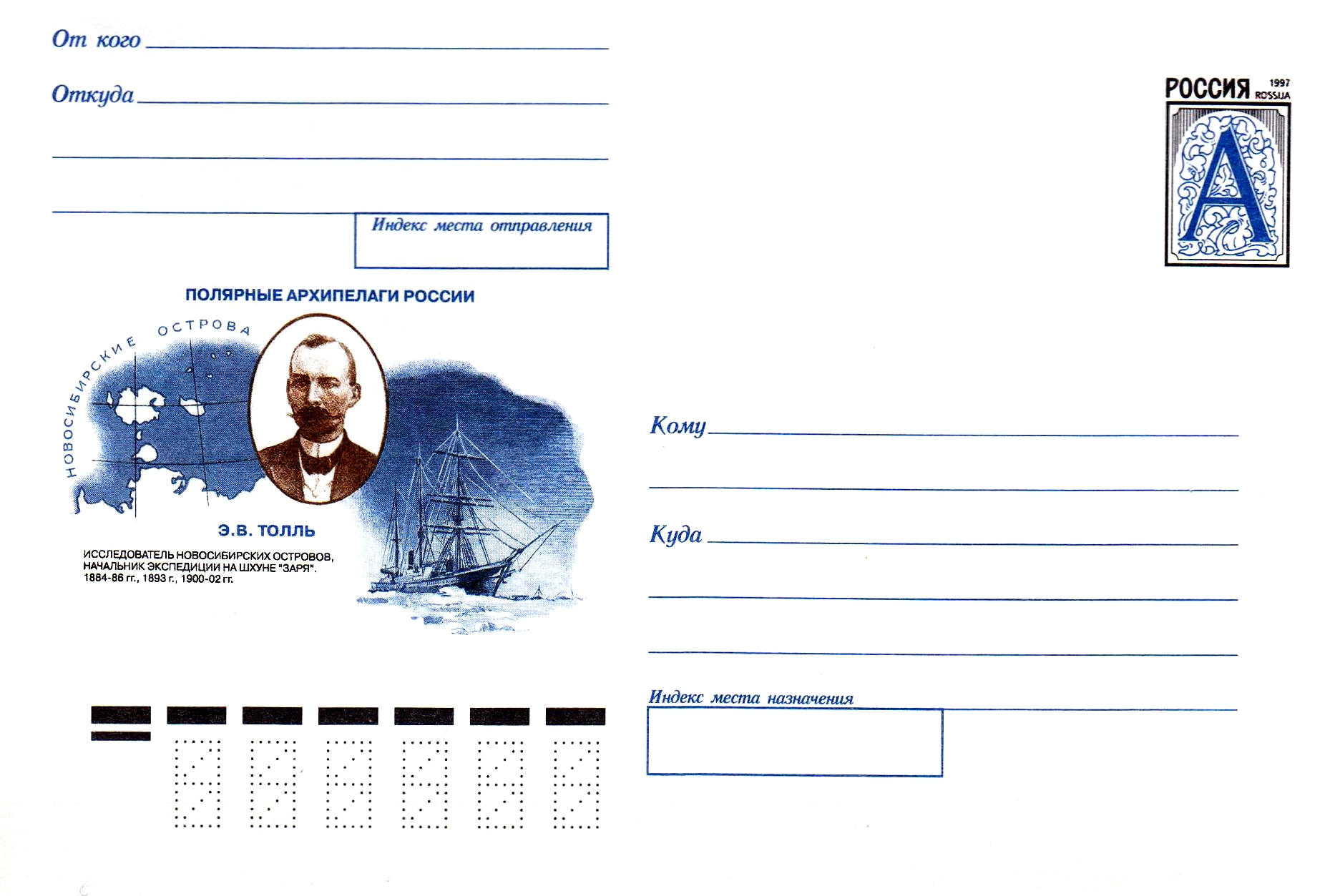
Russian mail envelope commemorating the polar expeditions of Toll

== Achievements and importance of the expedition ==
The expedition set an example of comprehensive and systematic description and measurements of the geographical features and depths of the arctic regions. It has discovered and explored several islands and compiled an accurate map of the Taimyr Peninsula and Kotelny Island.

Scientific results of the expedition covered meteorology, oceanography, terrestrial magnetism, glaciology, physical geography, botany, geology, paleontology, ethnology and aurora observations. It took 10–15 years to process them and publish in the Bulletin of the Russian Academy of Sciences and in nautical charts.

== See also ==
- Russian Arctic Ocean Hydrographic Expedition 1910–1915

== Bibliography ==
- Kruchinin A. (2010). Адмирал Колчак: жизнь, подвиг, память [Admiral Kolchak: life, feat, legacy]. Moscow: Atrel'. ISBN 978-5-17-063753-9.
- Toll E.V. (1959). Плавание на яхте "Заря" [Sailing on yacht Zarya]. Moscow: Geografgiz.
- Zyryanov P.N. (2012). Адмирал Колчак, верховный правитель России [Admiral Kolchak, the supreme ruler of Russia]. Vol. 1356 (4th ed.). Moscow: Molodaya Guardia. ISBN 978-5-235-03375-7.
