= Brusneva Island =

Island in Russia

Coordinates: 71.6552°N 129.0527°E

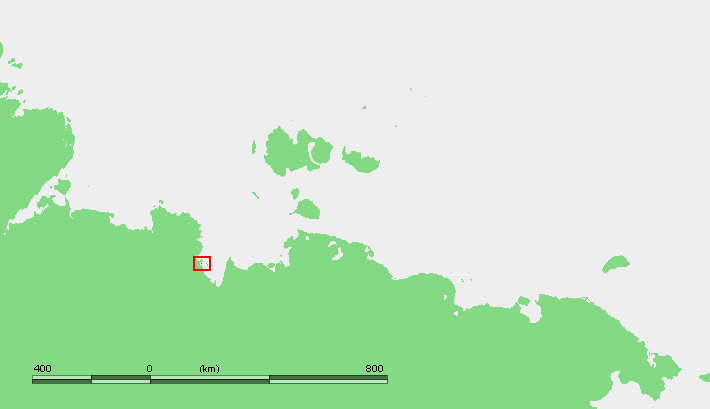
Location of Brusneva Island in the Tiksi Bay.

Brusneva Island, also spelt on some maps as Brusnova Island (Russian: Остров Бруснева, Ostrov Brusneva), is a small island in the Laptev Sea, within the Bulunsky Ulus, which is in the Sakha Republic (Yakutia), Russia. It is located off the eastern side of the Lena delta in the Tiksi Bay, only 5 km ENE of Tiksi, which is the northernmost seaport of Russia. Its length is 2.3 km and its maximum breadth less than 1 km. It has an altitude of 63 metres, or 209 feet. It is generally considered to be difficult to access.

Nearby cities and towns include Bykovskiy (19.4 nm), Bykovo (18.1 nm), Tuuru (22.0 nm) and Ary-Bykovskoye (28.4 nm) to the north as well as Polyarka (3.3 nm) and Sogo (7.5 nm) to the south. Nearby airports include the medium side Tiksi Airport (0.8 nm) which is north east of it, as well as the closed Tiksi West Air Base which is west of it (3 nm).

== Weather ==
Tiksi Bay, the area where Brusneva Island lies, is subject to severe Arctic weather with frequent gales and blizzards. The sea in the bay is frozen for about nine months every year.

== Population and Infrastructure ==
Some sources estimate that the population is 4557 people. However, other sources state that there is no permanent population and that the only remarkable thing that remains on the island is a ship graveyard as a significant part of the settlement's population left after the collapse of the USSR. Other than the shipwreck, there is also an active navigational lighthouse known as Ostrov Brusneva Light (ARLHS ASR-161). The lighthouse is a 10 metre, or 33 feet square cylindrical tower with a 105-ft focal plane. It has a white flash every 8 seconds.

== History ==
In August 1901 Russian Arctic ship Zarya headed across the Laptev Sea, searching for the legendary Sannikov Land (Zemlya Sannikova) but was soon blocked by floating pack ice in the New Siberian Islands. During 1902 the attempts to reach Sannikov Land continued while Zarya was trapped in fast ice. Leaving the ship, Russian Arctic explorer Baron Eduard Toll and three companions vanished forever in November 1902 while travelling away from Bennett Island towards the south on loose ice floes. After its ordeal in the ice, a badly-leaking Zarya was finally moored close to Brusneva Island in Bukhta Tiksi, never to leave the place again. The remaining members of the expedition returned to Saint Petersburg, while Captain Matisen went to Yakutsk.

The island of Brusneva was named after Russian Engineer M. I. Brusnev (Mikhail Ivanovich Brusnev), a member of the Russian Arctic Expedition, and was named in 1903 by the commander of the Russian arctic schooner "Zarya", F. A. Matisen (Fyodor Andreyevich Matisen). Brusnev led one of the two search parties that were dispatched in the spring of 1903 in order to search for ill-fated Russian Arctic explorer Baron Eduard Toll. Brusnev and his search party, searched the shores of the New Siberian Islands and a compiled detailed map of the island of New Siberia, while the other search party, led by Aleksandr Kolchak travelled by whaleboat to Bennett Island. Brusnev found the remains of a mammoth in the island of New Siberia during his unfruitful search for Eduard Toll. An obelisk was erected on the island for him.

In the 21st century, the Michurinsk Contest Group held one expedition to the island in 2015 and several more in the Soviet years.
