= Taymyr Strait =

Strait in Russia which separates Taymyr Island from Taymyr Peninsula

Coordinates: 76°08′47″N 95°47′48″E

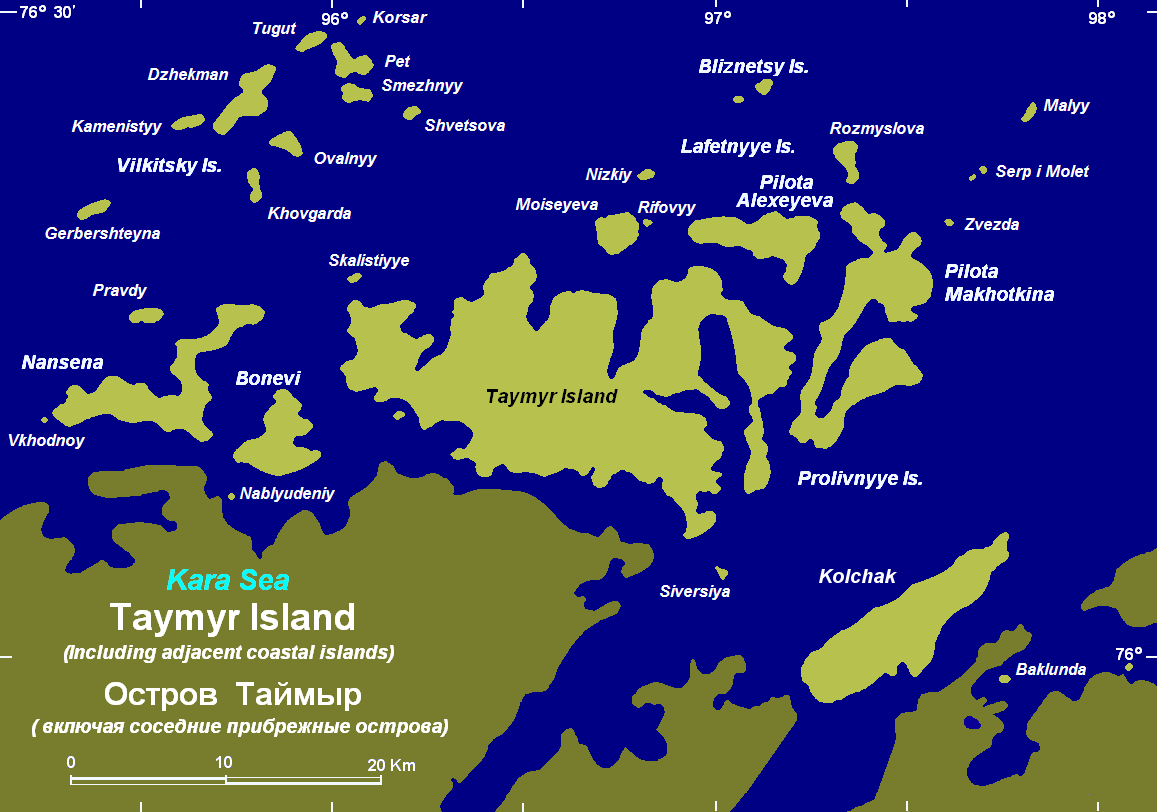
Map showing the location of Taymyr Strait

Taymyr Strait (Russian: Таймырский пролив) is a 3 km-wide strait in Russia. It separates Taymyr Island from Taymyr Peninsula, and connects the Palander Strait in the west with the Taymyr Gulf in the east.
