= Fyodor Matisen =

Russian naval officer, hydrographer, and explorer (1872–1921)

- Фёдор Матисен
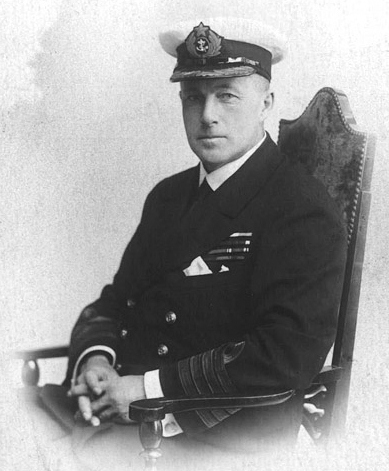
- Matisen in Royal Navy uniform, 1900
- Born: 1 June 1872; Saint Petersburg, Russia
- Died: 19 December 1921 (aged 49); Irkutsk, Russia
- Military career
- Allegiance: Russia
- Branch: Imperial Russian Navy
- Service years: 1897–1917
- Rank: Commander
- Commands: Russian polar expedition of 1900–1902
- Awards: Order of St. Vladimir

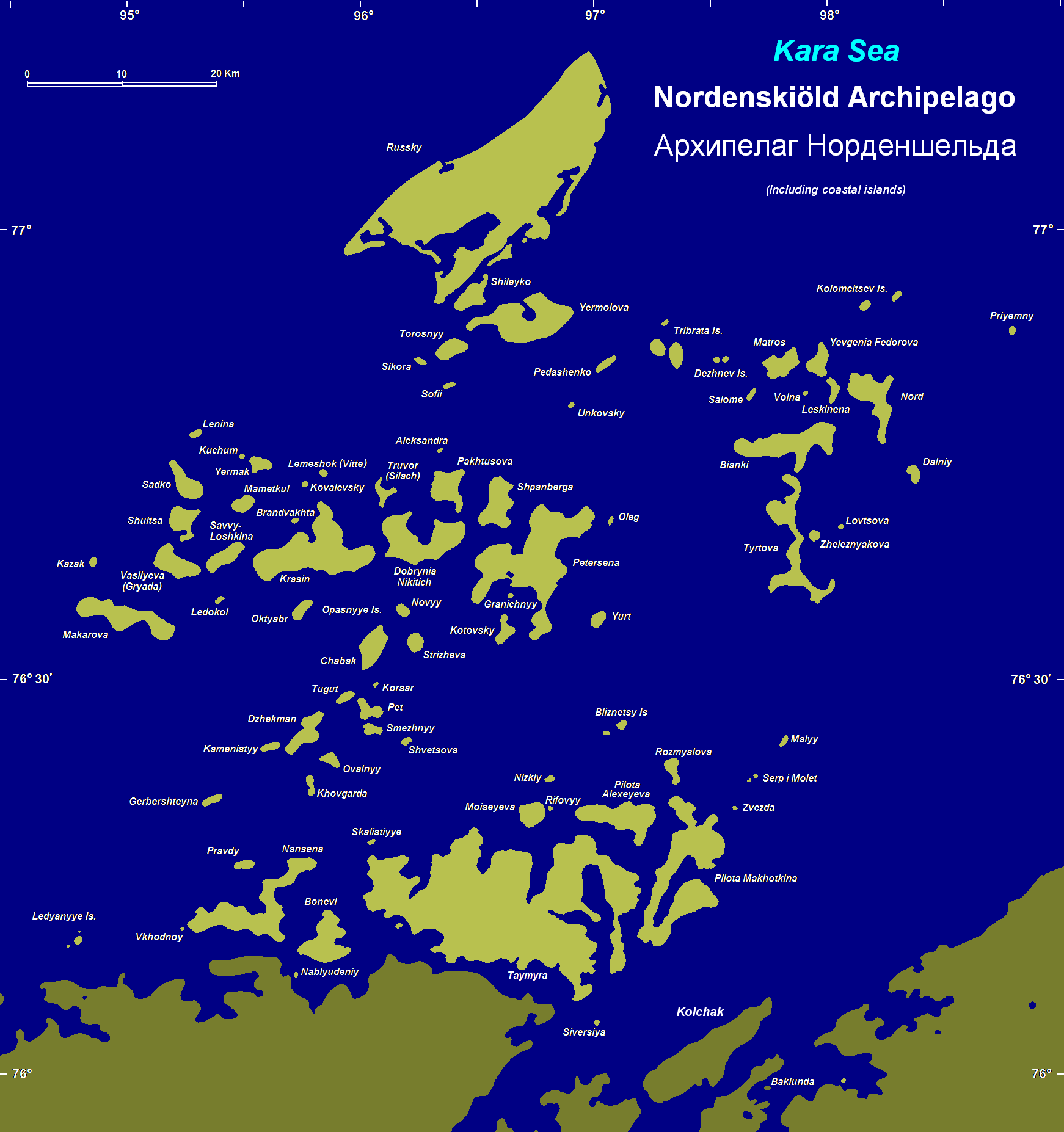
Fyodor Matisen was the first to make a thorough geographical survey of the Nordenskiöld Archipelago.

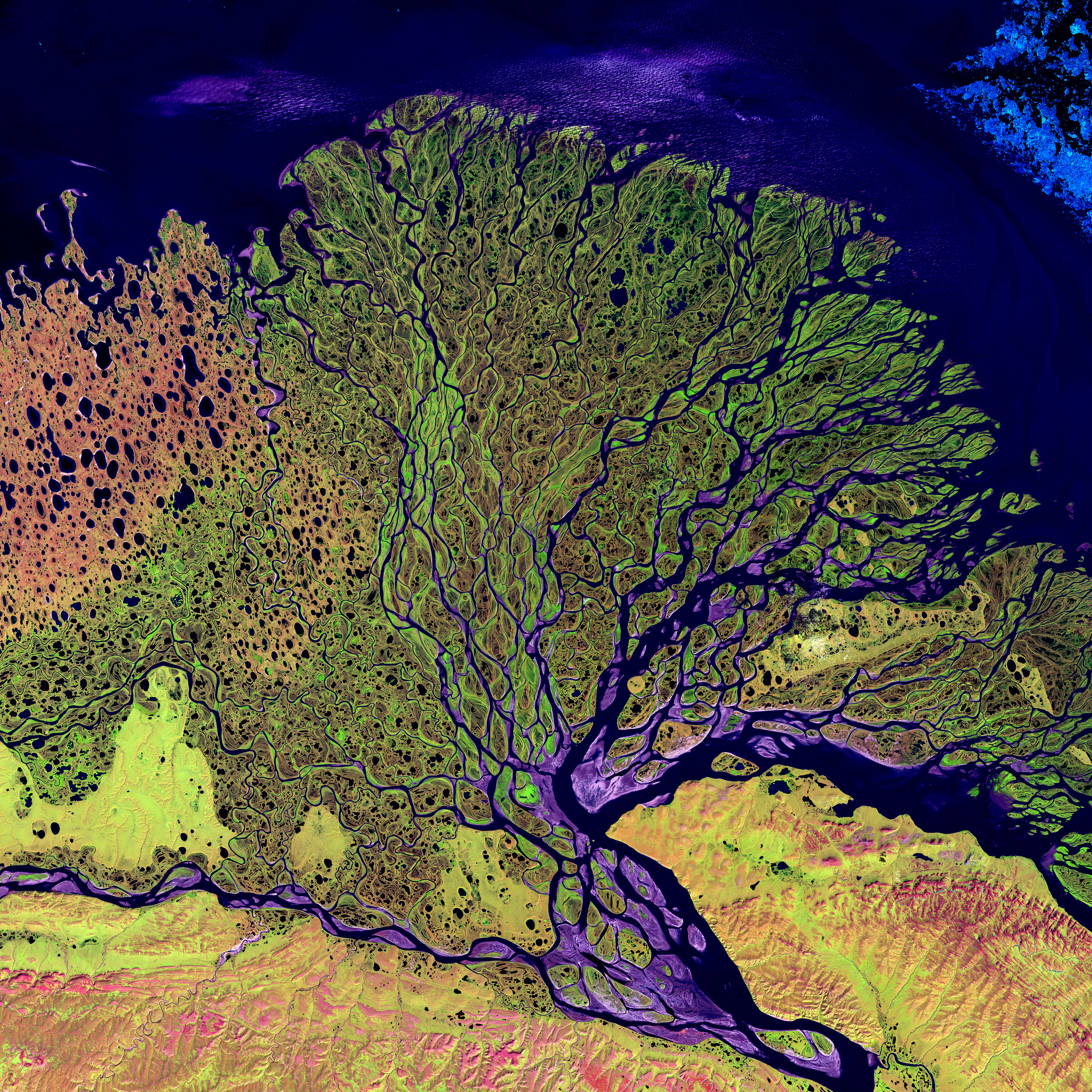
The mouths of the Lena River, another complex area surveyed by Matisen. (Photo: Landsat 2000)

Fyodor Andreyevich Matisen or Mathiesen (Russian: Фёдор Андреевич Матисен; 1 June [O.S. 20 May] 1872, – 19 December 1921) was an officer of the Russian Imperial Navy, hydrographer, and explorer.

Matisen explored and mapped wide areas of the coast of the Kara Sea and the Laptev Sea in the Russian Arctic. He was a friend of Alexander Kolchak and a member of the Russian Geographical Society and the Russian Academy of Sciences.

After having been senior officer and second-in-command, Matisen became the captain of Polar ship Zarya during the last part of the Russian polar expedition of 1900–1902 led by Baron Eduard von Toll.

== Early life and career ==
Fyodor Andreyevich Matisen graduated from the Naval Cadet Corps in 1897. Barely two years later, he took part in the 1899 Russian expedition to Svalbard.

== Russian polar expedition ==
Owing to the experience in polar exploration he acquired in Svalbard, Matisen was chosen for Baron Eduard Gustav von Toll's polar expedition on behalf of the Russian Academy of Sciences. He was named assistant to commander of Polar ship Zarya Nikolai Kolomeitsev. Matisen's friend Alexander Kolchak accompanied the expedition as third naval officer and hydrographer. All leading officers were from military background.

During the first wintering of Zarya close to Taymyr Island, the disagreements between Toll and Kolomeitsev became unsurmountable. Finally Baron von Toll sent Kolomeitsev away on a long sledge trip overland with the mission of organizing coal depots for the ship. When the former captain was gone Matisen was appointed by Toll as Zarya's commander.

In March, while Zarya was still stuck in ice, Matisen explored the Nordenskiöld Archipelago on dogsled through the frozen sea as far as Russky Island. From there he swung SW, then south through another region of the large archipelago. On this trip Matisen could only survey parts of the coastlines of many of the Nordenskiöld islands, but on a subsequent trip in April he was able to make corrections to his previous survey by determining with accuracy the coordinates of at least one island in each of the groups in which he divided the archipelago. In total Matisen discovered and named about 40 islands of the Nordenskiöld group; he also arranged the archipelago into the following four main subgroups: Vilkitsky Islands, Pakhtusov Islands, Tsivolko Islands and Litke Islands.

After the thaw, Matisen led Zarya across the Laptev Sea to the New Siberian Islands. The aim of Toll's expedition was to explore well the area north of the New Siberian Islands and eventually sail towards the Pole in order to find the elusive Sannikov Land.

However, Zarya was trapped in fast ice and was unlikely to be freed that winter. Leaving the ship, Toll and three companions went in search of Sannikov Land on foot and kayaks. They vanished in November 1902 while travelling away from Bennett Island towards the south on loose ice floes. The Zarya was able to set sail only on 11 August 1902; it headed straight towards Bennett Island but was unable to approach the island on account of the ice. Finally Captain Matisen abandoned the attempt and sailed towards the Lena river delta. Baron von Toll and his party were never found.

Despite this tragedy, the expedition was not a failure. Many important oceanographic investigations were carried out, so that the study of data continued until 1917 and remained uncompleted. Besides, the Expedition plotted about 200 new geographical names on the map of the Arctic region.

After exploring the mouths of the Lena River, Matisen left a badly leaking Zarya to sink at Tiksi Bay, close to the Lena delta. On 6 August 1903, after forwarding all scientific equipment to Saint Petersburg, the ship was stripped and its hull was allowed to fill with water. Matisen lowered the flag of the Neva Yacht Club for the last time and left Zarya. Matisen returned to Yakutsk on board ship Lena with Captain Yershevskiy. Apparently Zarya's remains still lie close to Brusneva Island at Bukhta Tiksi.

== Later life ==
In 1904–1905, Matisen saw active service in the Russo-Japanese War. He was a senior navigator on cruiser Zhemchug which was rushed to Tsushima to assist the Russian fleet. He took part in the Battle of Tsushima.

At the time of the Russian Revolution of 1917 when the Russian fleet virtually ceased to exist, Matisen left Russia like many of his naval colleagues. He served as a hydrographer in the British Royal Navy for a period of time, but opted to return to Russia and went to Vladivostok in 1919. During a journey to the Far Eastern Republic, Matisen contracted typhus. He became severely ill and was sent to a military hospital in Irkutsk where he died in December 1921.

== Posthumous honors ==
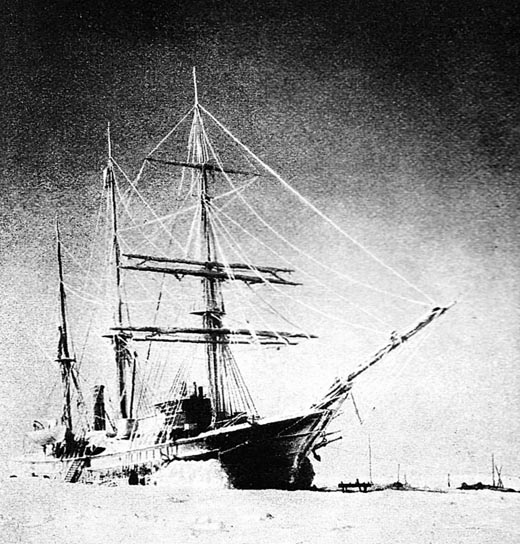
Russian Polar ship Zarya in 1910

Matisen was awarded the Order of St. Vladimir for his lifelong work in hydrography.

One of the two major channels separating the groups of the Nordenskiöld Archipelago has been named "Matisen Strait" (the other one is named after Lenin). A "Dmitriy Ovtsyn" class coastal survey ship was named Fyodor Matisen by the USSR government in 1976.

== See also ==
- Russian Hydrographic Service
- Zarya (polar ship)
- Nikolai Nikolaevich Kolomeitsev
