= Kolomeytsev Islands =

Two small Russian islands in the Kara Sea

Coordinates: 76°54′36″N 97°48′38″E

Kolomeitsev Islands
Native name: острова́ Коломе́йцева
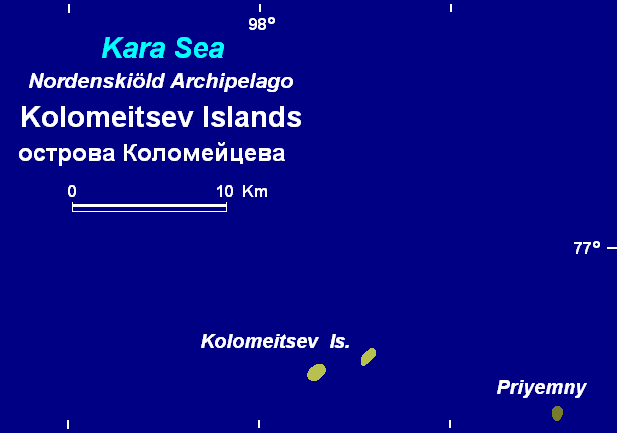
- Map of the Kolomeitsev Islands

- Location within Nordenskiöld Archipelago

Geography
- Location: Kara Sea
- Archipelago: Nordenskiöld Archipelago
- Total islands: 2

Administration
- Russia
- Krai: Krasnoyarsk Krai

Demographics
- Population: uninhabited

The Kolomeytsev Islands (Russian: острова́ Коломе́йцева, ostrova Kolomeytseva) are two small Russian islands, at the northwestern end of the Nordenskjold Archipelago in the Kara Sea coastal region, off the coast of Siberia.

== Geography and history ==
The Kolomeytsev Islands lie about 40 kilometers (25 mi) east of Russky Island, the largest island of the Nordenskjold Archipelago, and less than 100 kilometers (62 mi) west of the Taymyr Peninsula. The climate in the northernmost end of the archipelago is severe and the sea surrounding the little Kolomeytsev Islands is covered with fast ice in the winter and often obstructed by pack ice even in the summer.

These islands belong to the Krasnoyarsk Krai administrative division of Russia and is part of the Great Arctic State Nature Reserve, the largest nature reserve of Russia.

In 1900, the islands of the Nordenskiöld Archipelago were explored by Russian geologist Baron Eduard Von Toll during the Polar Expedition on behalf of the Imperial Russian Academy of Sciences aboard ship Zarya. The islands were named after Captain Nikolai Kolomeitsev, first commander of the ship. (Albert Hastings Markham. Arctic Exploration, 1895)
