= Nordenskiöld Archipelago =

Cluster of Russian islands in the Kara Sea

Native name: Архипелаг Норденшельда
- Island groups within the archipelago

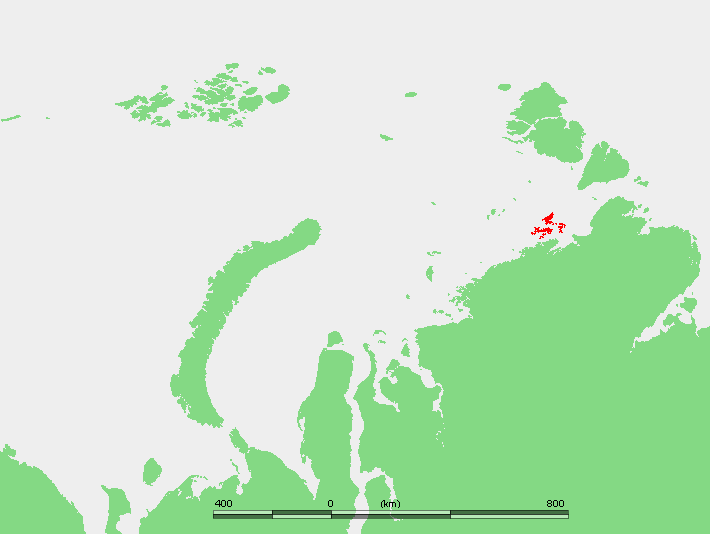
- Location of the Nordenskiöld Archipelago in the Kara Sea

- Location within Russia

Geography
- Location: Kara Sea
- Coordinates: 76°35′N 96°40′E
- Total islands: 90
- Major islands: Russky Island, Taymyr, Nansen, Kolchak
- Length: 100 km (60 mi)
- Width: 90 km (56 mi)
- Highest elevation: 107 m (351 ft)
- Highest point: Chabak Island HP

Administration
- Russia

Demographics
- Population: 0

The Nordenskiöld Archipelago or Nordenskjold Archipelago (Russian: Архипелаг Норденшельда, romanized: Arkhipelag Nordenshel'da) is a large and complex cluster of about 90 islands in the eastern region of the Kara Sea. Its eastern limit lies 120 km (75 mi) west of the Taymyr Peninsula. The archipelago is part of the Taymyrsky Dolgano-Nenetsky District of the Krasnoyarsk Krai administrative division of Russia.

These are mainly formed by igneous rocks and are covered with tundra vegetation. Except for two polar stations, one which was permanent in Russky Island between 1935 and 1999 and a temporary one in Tyrtov Island (Tyrtova) (1940–1975), there is no permanent human presence in any island of the archipelago.

== Geography and environment ==
The Nordenskiöld Archipelago stretches for almost 100 km (62 mi) from west to east and about 90 km (56 mi) from north to south in the Kara Sea, off the Siberian shores, where there are large coastal islands around Taymyr Island. The average elevation of the islands is relatively low. The highest point of the archipelago (107 m) is located in Chabak, one of the islands of the Vilkitsky subgroup. Some of the islands have wetlands.

The climate in the Nordenskiöld Archipelago is Arctic and severe. The sea surrounding the multitude of island groups is covered with fast ice in the winter and it is obstructed by pack ice even in the summer, which lasts only about two months in a normal year.

=== Birds ===
The islands regularly support significant populations of brent geese and ivory gulls. The archipelago has been recognised as an Important Bird Area (IBA) by BirdLife International.

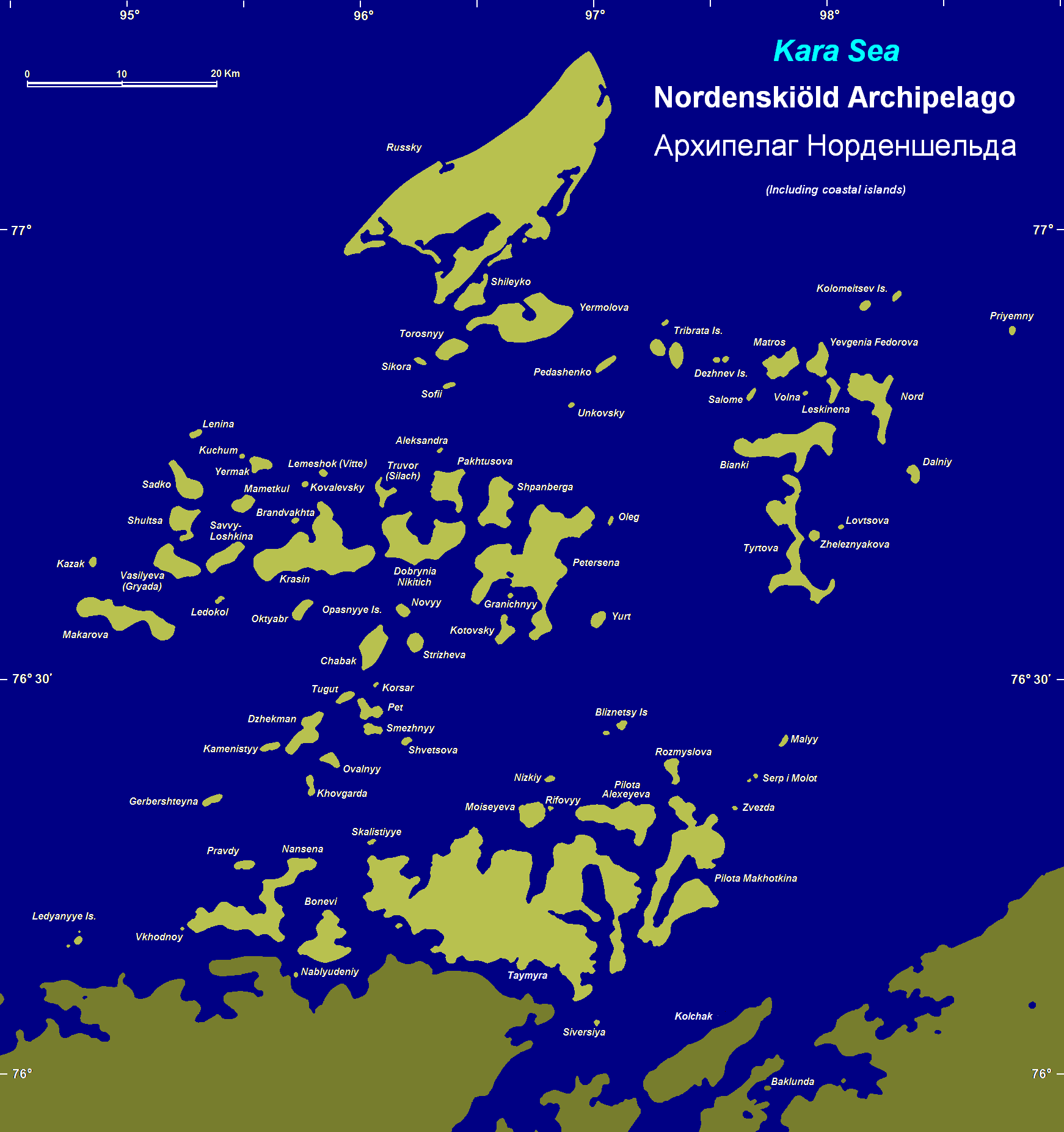
Nordenskiöld Archipelago and adjacent Siberian coastal islands

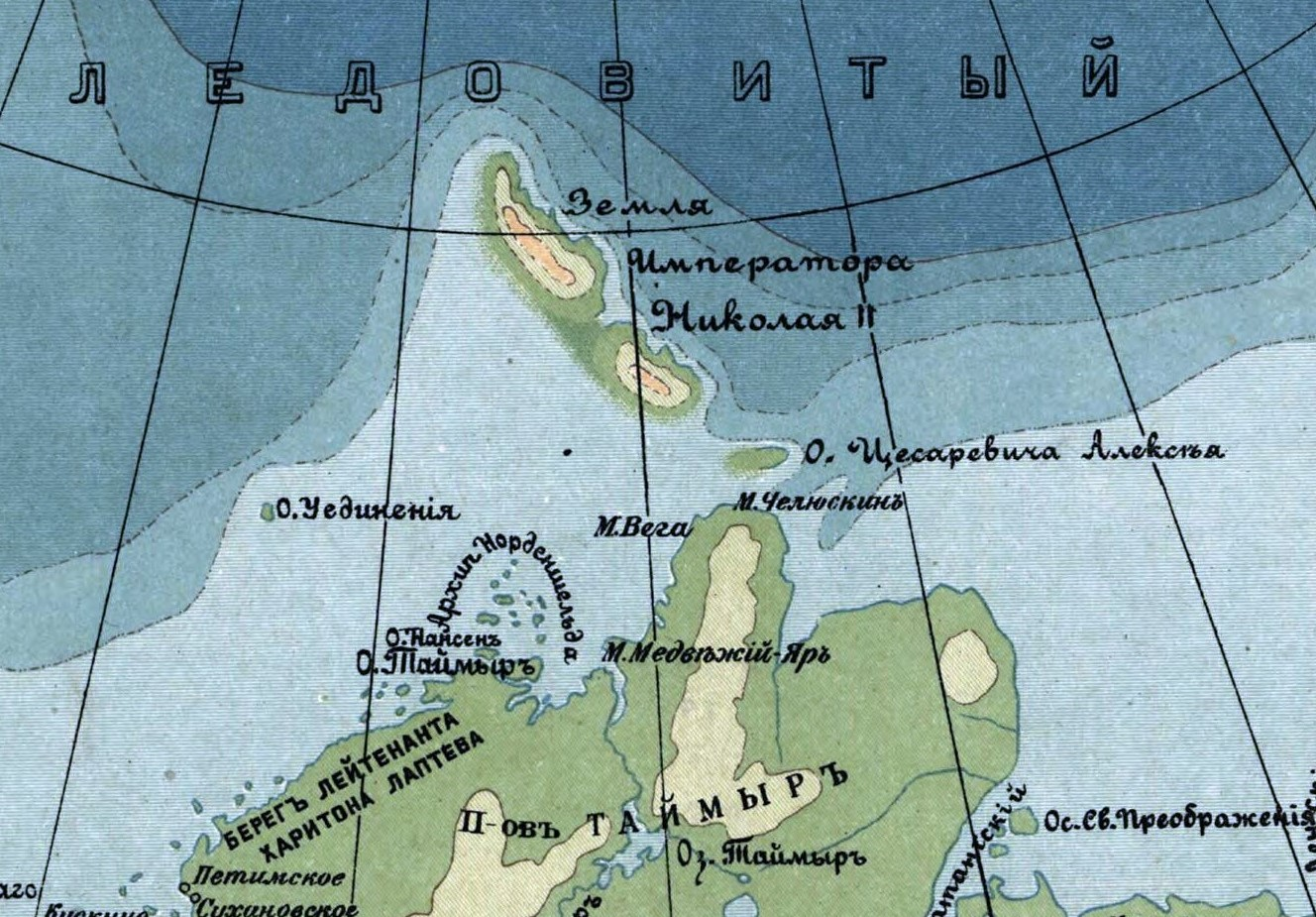
The Nordenskiöld Archipelago, located south of partly surveyed Emperor Nicholas II Land; a 1915 map of the Russian Empire

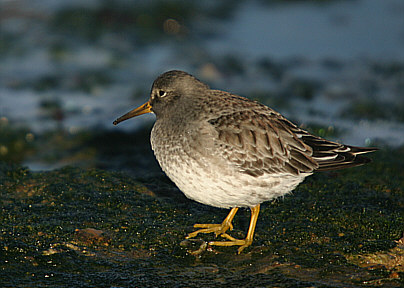
The purple sandpiper is one of the birds foraging in the shores and wetlands of the archipelago in the summer

=== Islands ===
There are about 90 cold, windswept and desolate islands in this archipelago. They are divided into groups, with the main ones from west to east:

==== Tsivolko Islands ====
The Tsivolko Islands (острова Циволько; Ostrova Tsivolko) 76°44′N 94°38′E is the westernmost group.

- Krasin Island, named after icebreaker Krasin, the biggest island in the group.
- Lenin Island
- Yermak Island
- Kuchum Island
- Sadko Island
- Schultz Island
- Mametkul Island
- Vitte Island (Lemeshok)
- Kovalevsky Island
- Ukromny Island
- Brandwacht Island
- Savvy Loshkin Island
- Vasilyev Island
- Gryada Island
- Kazak Island
- Ledokol Island
- Makarov Island
- Oktyabr Island

==== Vilkitsky Islands ====
The Vilkitsky Islands (острова Вилькицкого), also known as 'Dzhekman Islands' 76°25′N 95°15′E, located north of the Matisen Strait.

- Novyy Island (New Island)
- Strizhev Island
- Chabak Island, the biggest and highest island in the group.
- Tsentralny Island (Central Island)
- Korsar Island
- Opasnyye Islands, group of small islets
- Grozny Island (Terrible Island)
- Tugut Island
- Pet Island
- Smezhny Island
- Shvetsov Island
- Dzhekman Island
- Kamenisty Island
- Ovalny Island
- Hovgaard Island (Khovgarda)
- Herberstein Island (Gerbersteina)

==== Pakhtusov Islands ====
The Pakhtusov Islands (острова Пахтусова; Ostrova Pakhtusova) 76°37′N 95°53′E, located south of the Lenin Strait.

- Alexandra Island
- Pakhtusov Island
- Shpanberg Island
- Truvor Island
- Silach Island
- Petersen Island, largest island in the group.
- Olyeg Island
- Dobrynia Nikitich Island
- Skudnye Island
- Zverolovny Island
- Granichny Island
- Navarin Island
- Yurt Island
- Kotovsky Island

==== Litke Islands ====
The Litke Islands (острова Литке; Ostrova Litke), 76°49′N 96°36′E. This group includes Russky Island (остров Русский; Ostrov Russkiy) 77°03′N 96°09′E. Located at the archipelago's northern end, this is the largest island of the Nordenskiöld group.

- Shileyko Island, close to Russky's southern coast
- Torosny Island, with 42 m, the highest point in the subgroup
- Sofii Island
- Sikora Island
- Unkovsky Island
- Yermolov Island, large island, south of Shileyko
- Pedashenko Island
- Tribrata Island (Three Brothers Islands), a group of three small islands

==== Vostochnyye Islands ====
The Vostochnyye Islands (Восточные острова; Vostochnyye Ostrova, "Eastern Islands"), latitude 76° 38' N and longitude 97° 30' E. This group includes the Kolomeitsev Islands (острова Коломейцева; Ostrova Kolomeytseva) 76°56′N 97°48′E.

- Tyrtov Island, longest island of the group
- Lovtsov Island
- Zheleznyakov Island
- Dezhnev Islands, small group of two islands
- Matros Island, 54 m high rocky island
- Salome Island
- Volna Island (Wave Island)
- Yevgeny Fyodorov Islands, group of two relatively large islands
- Nord Island, named after ship Nord of the Russian Hydrographic Department.
- Bianki Island
- Leskinen Island
- Dalniy Island
- Priemny Island, the easternmost island of the archipelago

==== Coastal islands ====
The southern extension of the wider archipelago, consisting of the islands located south of the Matisen Strait near and around Taymyr Island. Kolchak Island, located further south, is not geographically part of the Nordenskiöld Archipelago in the strict sense.

- Taymyr Island, the largest island of the coastal group
- Bonevi Island
- Nansen Island, a large island
- Pravdy Island
- Vkhodnoy Island
- Nablyudeniy Island
- Bliznetsy Islands
- Rifovyy Island
- Nizkiy Island
- Moiseyev Island
- Lafetnyye Islands
- Ledyanyye Islands
- Skalistyye Island
- Rozmyslov Island
- Malyy Island
- Serp i Molot Island
- Zvezda Island
- Pilot Alexeyev Island
- Pilot Makhotkin Island, a large island with a very indented coastline
- Siversiy Island

== History ==
This archipelago was first reported in 1740 by Nikifor Chekin, who accompanied Semion Chelyuskin in the Great Northern Expedition. Many years later it was named after arctic explorer Adolf Erik Nordenskiöld by Norwegian polar explorer Fridtjof Nansen in his maps of the northern coasts and seas of Siberia.

In 1893, when Fridtjof Nansen's Fram was near the Nordenskjold Archipelago, it got stuck in dead water. This is a strange phenomenon that typically occurs in fjords, as glaciers melt and a form a shallow layer of freshwater ice over salty water. This is how Nansen described the phenomenon:

Towards the end of August 1893, when the Fram was off the Taymyr Peninsula, near the Nordenskiöld Archipelago, "dead water" was encountered. This is a peculiar phenomenon, which occurs where a surface layer of fresh water rests upon the salt water of the sea. It manifests itself in the form of larger or smaller ripples or waves stretching across the wake, the one behind the other, arising sometimes as far forward as almost midships. When caught in dead water, Fram appeared to be held back, as if by some mysterious force, and she did not always answer the helm. In calm weather, with a light cargo, Fram was capable of 6 to 7 knots. When in dead water she was unable to make 1.5 knots. We made loops in our course turned sometimes right around, tried all sorts of antics to get clear of it, but to very little purpose.

In 1900 the islands of the Nordenskiöld Archipelago were explored and mapped with accuracy by Captain Fyodor Andreyevich Matisen during the Russian polar expedition of 1900–1902. This venture was led by Baron Eduard Von Toll on behalf of the Imperial Russian Academy of Sciences aboard ship Zarya. Toll sent Matisen to make a survey of the archipelago in the early spring while the Zarya was wintering close to Taymyr Island. Most islands of the Nordenskiöld Archipelago were charted and named during this effort. Matisen crisscrossed the whole vast frozen area on dogsled twice. He divided the archipelago into four of the five main groups mentioned above and named more than forty islands.

Like Nansen, Eduard Toll observed that it was difficult to navigate through the archipelago on account of the ice.

After the Russian Revolution, the archipelago was explored in the 1930s by a Soviet expedition on the icebreaker Sedov.

In 1937 the Arctic Institute of the USSR organized an expedition on ship Toros. The purpose of this expedition was to explore the Nordenskiöld Archipelago and to thoroughly investigate the Northern Sea Route in the Kara Sea. The Toros overwintered in Ledyanaya Bay on Bonevi Island west of Taymyr Island and sailed back to Arkhangelsk during the summer thaw after having explored many Kara Sea islands.

On 25 August 1942, during Operation Wunderland, Kriegsmarine cruiser Admiral Scheer fell upon the Russian icebreaker Sibiryakov (under the command of Captain Kacharev) off the northwest coast of Russky Island at the northern end of the Nordenskiöld Archipelago. The Sibiryakov resisted but was sunk by the German warship. Then Admiral Scheer headed southwest in order to attack the Soviet military installations at Dikson.

Since May 1993 the Nordenskiöld Archipelago is part of the Great Arctic State Nature Reserve, the largest nature reserve of Russia. The Arctic station at Russky Island was closed in 1999.

== See also ==
- Fyodor Andreyevich Matisen
- Icebreaker Sedov
- List of islands of Russia
- List of research stations in the Arctic
- Nansen's Fram expedition
- Operation Wunderland

== Bibliography ==
- Valerian Albanov, In the Land of the White Death, 2001. Contains pictures of Fridtjof Nansen's early Arctic maps.
