= Nikolai Kolomeitsev =

Naval officer of the Russian Empire and Arctic explorer

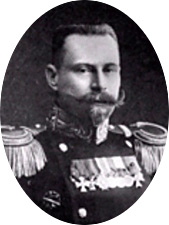
- Pre-1917 photo of Kolomeitsev
- Born: 16 July 1867; Pokrovka, Kherson Governorate, Russian Empire (now part of Mykolaiv Oblast, Ukraine)
- Died: 6 October 1944 (aged 77); Paris, France
- Military career
- Allegiance: Russian Empire; Russian Republic
- Branch: Imperial Russian Navy
- Service years: 1884–1920
- Rank: Admiral
- Commands: Baltic Fleet
- Conflicts: Russo-Japanese War; World War I Russian Civil War
- Awards: Order of Saint Stanislaus (Imperial House of Romanov); Order of St. George; Order of St. Anna; Order of St. Vladimir

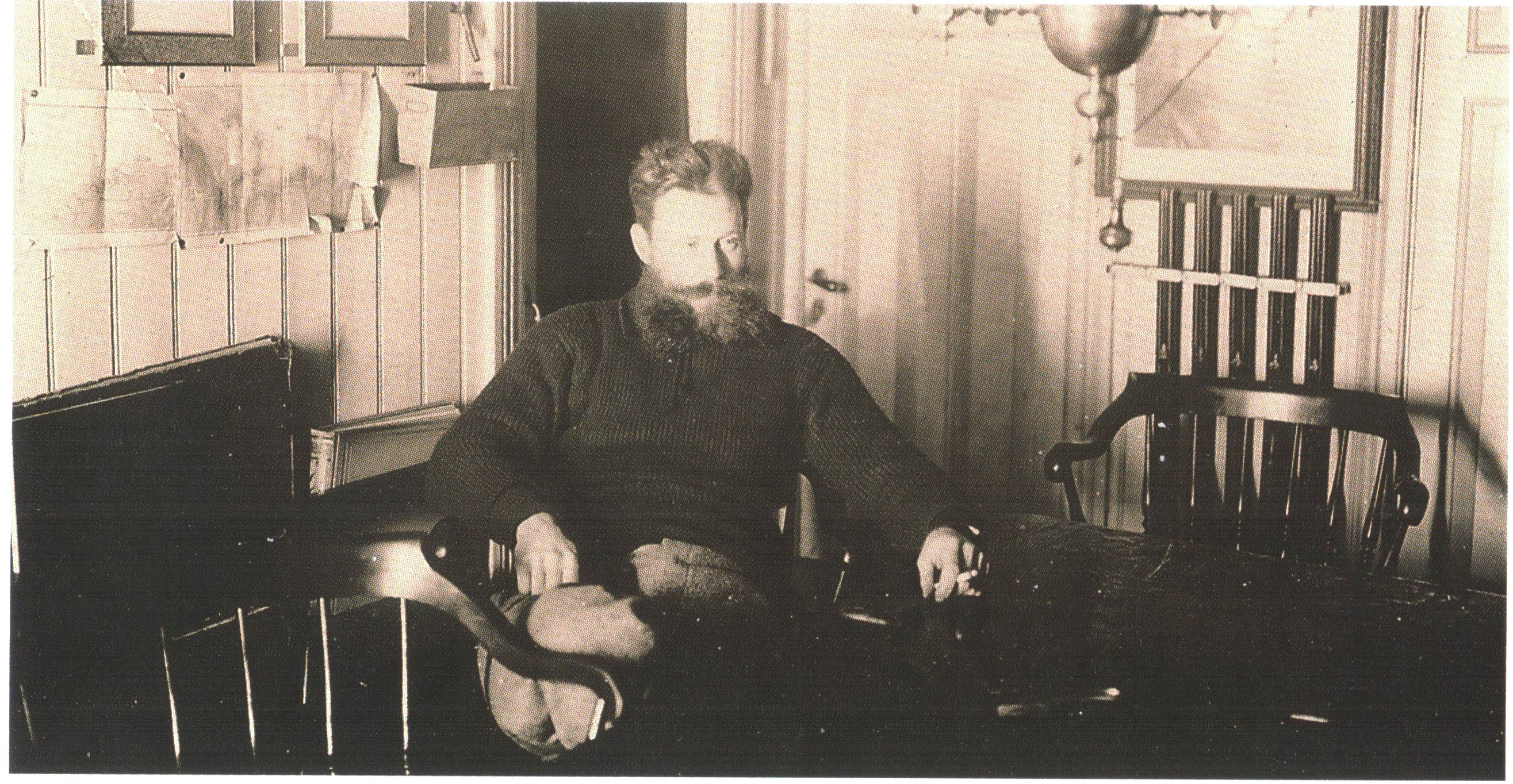
Kolomeitsev in the Zarya in 1900

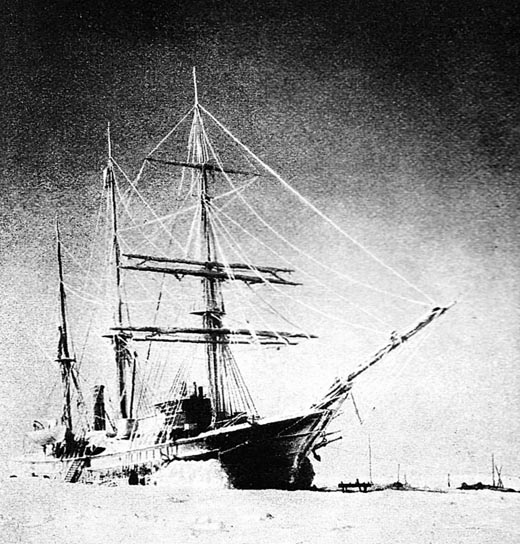
Russian Polar ship Zarya in 1902

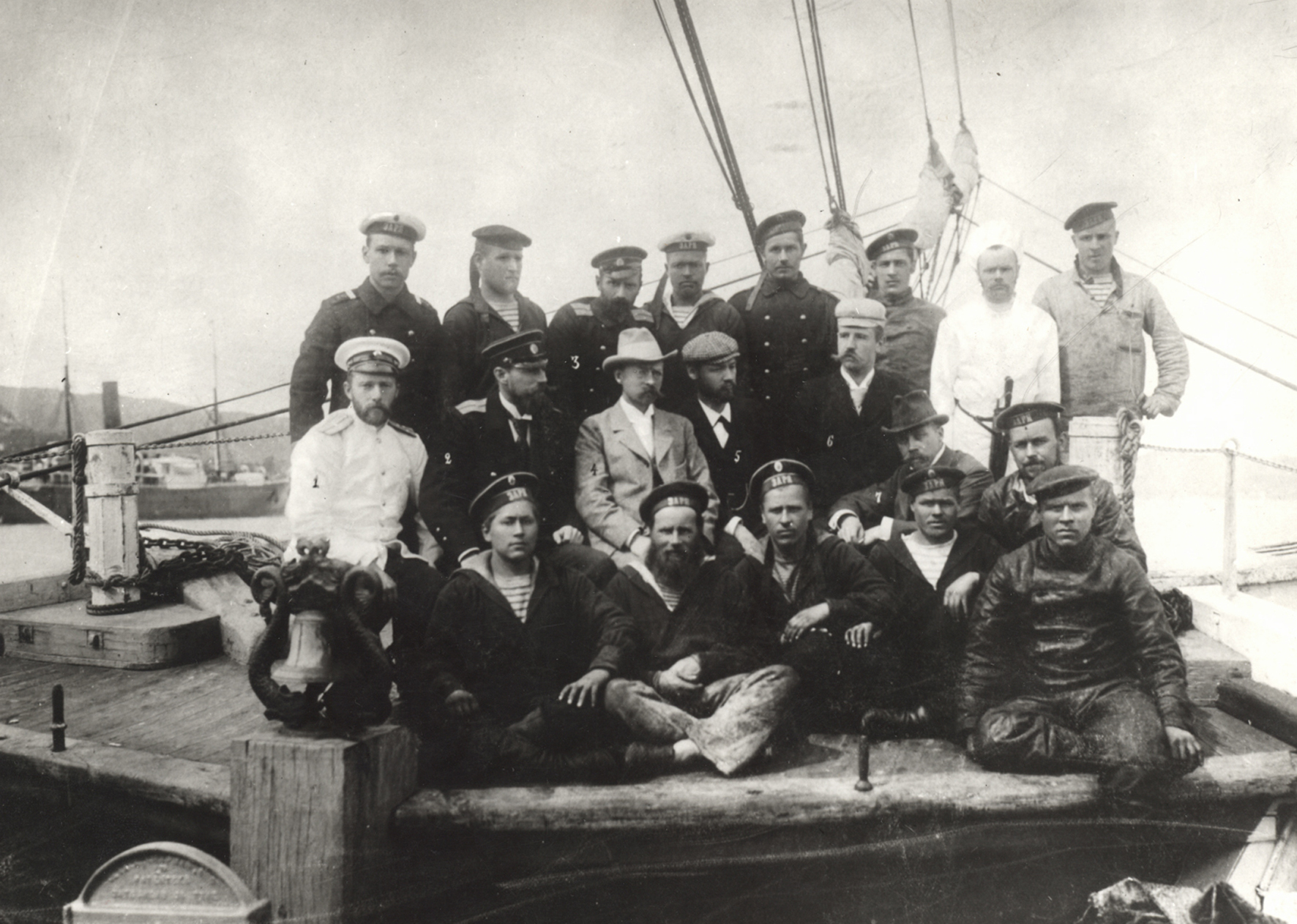
Expedition members aboard Zarya. Top row, third from left: Alexander Kolchak. Second row: Kolomeitsev, Matisen, Toll, Walter, Seeberg and Byalynitsky-Birulya.

Nikolai Nikolaevich Kolomeitsev, also spelt Kolomeytsev (Russian: Николай Николаевич Коломейцев; 16 July 1867 – 6 October 1944), was a naval officer of the Russian Empire and Arctic explorer. During the Russian Civil War, he fought for the Whites.

== Early life ==
Nikolai Kolomeitsev was born in the village of Pokrovka in the Kherson Governorate of the Russian Empire (present-day part of Mykolaiv Oblast, Ukraine) in 1867. He entered military service in 1884 and graduated as an officer of the Imperial Russian Navy in 1887. He was promoted to lieutenant in December 1893.

== Naval career ==
In 1894–1895, he was assigned to the Russian Pacific Fleet, and after graduating from mine warfare school, served on several vessels operating in Siberia.

Kolomeitsev became a member of the Chief Hydrographic Administration's Survey Expedition to the White Sea. He also took part in an expedition to the Yenisei Gulf led by L. Dobrotvorskiy, which gave him expertise on sailing in arctic waters.

=== Russian polar expedition of 1900–1902 ===
In 1900, Baron Eduard Toll led an expedition on behalf of the Russian Academy of Sciences on the ship Zarya. Kolomeitsev was commander of the ship and his second-in-command was Fyodor Andreyevich Matisen, who had taken part in a previous exploratory trip to Svalbard. Alexander Kolchak also accompanied the expedition as third naval officer and hydrographer. All these officers were from military backgrounds. Known as "The Russian Polar Expedition", its aim was to thoroughly explore the area north of the New Siberian Islands and eventually sail towards the North Pole in order to find the elusive Sannikov Land.

Kolomeitsev supervised the fitting out of the Zarya in Larvik, Norway, and the expedition sailed from Saint Petersburg on 7 July 1900. Soon there was friction between Toll and Kolomeitsev concerning treatment of the crew. Kolomeitsev, as a classic naval officer of the Russian Imperial Navy tried to keep a distance with the men and to impose harsh punishments for unruly behavior, but Toll (more in line with the spirit of the times in Russia) longed for comradeship, and treated the common sailors as equals. Therefore, both men were getting on each other's nerves, Kolomeitsev interpreted Toll's attitude as undermining his authority as commander. The situation became worse during the first wintering in a bay just southwest of Taymyr Island. (Toll named the bay "Bukhta Kolin Archera", after Colin Archer Shipyard where Zarya had been fitted). Owing to the claustrophobic conditions of the wintering period, the relationship between captain Kolomeitsev and expedition leader Eduard Toll reached breaking point.

Toll sent Kolomeitsev along with Cossack officer Stepan Rastorguyev on dangerous sledge trips into snowstorms to the mouth of Taymyr River. He also sent him on a mission to organize coal depots for the Zarya on Dixon and Golchikha, as well as to bring the expedition's mail to Dudinka. Toll could not hide his relief at seeing Kolomeitsev depart, but these dangerous trips without even a proper map nearly got Kolomeitsev and Rastorguyev killed. After Kolomeitsev had been relieved of his duties and split from the main expedition, Fyodor Matisen was promoted as commander of Zarya. Although Kolomeitsev and Rastorguyev failed to find the Taymyr River, they travelled more than 800 km, reaching the Dudinka River, a tributary of the Yenisei by May 1901. These trips resulted in significant corrections of the local maps and in the discovery of the Upper Taymyr River.

Years later, Baroness Emmy von Toll, Eduard Toll's widow, played down the fact that there were strong disagreements between "old school" Captain Kolomeitsev and her egalitarian husband. When editing her husband's journal she stated: "Further, I have omitted as non-essential the details of the mutual relations between expedition members."

Apparently, Kolomeitsev was one of the few supporters of Imperial Russia in the expedition. During the last part of the journey, in the New Siberian Islands, Captain Matisen hoisted the flag of the Neva Yacht Club (Nevskiy Flot), instead of the Russian flag, on Zarya's mast. That flag flew over Zarya until it was sunk.

Kolomeitsev wrote two books about his journey with the Russian Polar Expedition; one of them was published in 1901 by the Imperial Naval Academy (Izvestiya Imperatorskoy Akademii Nauk) and the other in 1902 by the Imperial Geographical Society (Izvestiya Imperatorskago Russkago Geographicheskago Obschestva).

In 1902 Kolomeitsev commanded the icebreaker Yermak, one of the world's first true icebreakers. He was promoted to the rank of junior captain on 6 December 1904

=== Russo-Japanese War ===
During the Russo-Japanese War, Kolomeitsev was captain of the torpedo boat destroyer Buinyi (Буйный) with the Second Pacific Squadron, which saw action during the Battle of Tsushima. He became a hero during the battle when he brought his boat alongside the burning flagship Knyaz Suvorov. He rescued Admiral Zinovi Petrovich Rozhestvenski, wounded in the head by a shell from his burning and sinking battleship, as well as part of the crew. Admiral Rozhestvenski was transferred to torpedo boat Bedoviy (Бедовый). Kolomeitsev's boat Buinyi returned to Vladivostok and was sunk by artillery fire of cruiser Dmitri Donskoi. Kolomeitsev, also severely wounded, was captured by the Japanese with the crews of Dmitri Donskoy, Buinyi and Oslabya on Dagelet Island. Almaz, Braviy and Grozniy were the only three vessels that returned to Vladivostok after the Tsushima battle.

=== Later naval career ===
Following the Russian defeat against Japan, Kolomeitsev served as executive officer on the battleship Andrei Pervozvanny in late 1906. He graduated from the Naval Maritime Academy of Sciences in 1908, he was assigned command of the cruiser Almaz and was promoted to full captain on 6 December 1909. From November 1910 to December 1913 he commanded the battleship Slava. On 6 December 1913 Kolomeitsev was promoted to the rank of Rear admiral.

=== First World War and Russian Revolution ===
With the start of World War I in 1914 Kolomeitsev commanded the cruiser squadron of the Russian Baltic Fleet. He retired from active duty on 6 October 1917 with the rank of Vice admiral. During the Russian Revolution, he was arrested by the Bolshevik government in 1917 and imprisoned in the Peter and Paul Fortress in Petrograd. He escaped in 1918 and fled over the ice to Finland. In 1918, he joined the White movement Volunteer Army and the Armed Forces of South Russia and assigned command of the anti-Bolshevik naval forces in the Baltic Sea.

== Family ==
In 1910 Nikolai Kolomeitsev, already in his early forties, married Nina Dmitrievna Nabokov, a member of the Nabokov family.

=== Exile and death ===
Following the collapse of the White movement in the Russian Civil War, Kolomeitsev went into exile with his wife in France. He served as vice-chairman of the Union Knights of St. George in France.

Kolomeitsev died in Paris in 1944 after he was run over by a United States Army truck. He was 77. He is buried in Sainte-Geneviève-des-Bois Russian Cemetery.

== Honours ==
- Silver medal for lifesaving (1890) with bow (1893)
- Officer of the Royal Order of Cambodia, French colonial (1895)
- Order of St. Anne 3rd degree (1895)
- Silver medal to commemorate the reign of Emperor Alexander III (1896)
- Gold Medal for lifesaving (1896)
- Silver medal in memory of the Sacred Coronation of Their Imperial Majesties (1898)
- Bronze Medal in memory of the war in China (1902)
- Order of St. Stanislaus 3rd degree with sword, (1904)
- Order of St Vladimir, 4th degree with swords and bow, (1904)
- Light bronze medal in memory of the war with Japan in 1904–1905 (1906)
- Golden Sword of St George "for bravery" (01/08/1906)
- Order of St. George, 4th class, (1907)
- Commander of the Royal Victorian Order, UK (1908)
- Gold mark in the memory after the full course Sciences Marine Corps (1910)
- Light bronze medal in memory of 300 years of the reign of the Romanovs (1913)
- Order of St Vladimir, 3rd degree, (1913)
- Legion of Honour, Commander's Croix, France (1914)
- Light bronze medal in memory of the 200th anniversary of the victory of Gangutskaya
- Order of St. Stanislaus 1st degree, (1916)

=== Posthumous honours ===
Since he was a war hero, and despite his support of the White movement, Nikolai Kolomeitsev was also honored by the USSR regime. A small island group (Kolomeitsev Islands), a bay in the Kara Sea (Bukhta Kolomeitseva), a mountain (Gora Kolomeitseva) 73.990°N 84.258°E, a river (Reka Kolomeitseva) 75.840°N 95.820°E, as well as a Russian vessel —coastal survey ship Nikolay Kolomeytsev) built in 1972, bear Captain Kolomeitsev's name.

== Works ==
- Otchet plavanii yachty "Zarya" s iyunya po sentyabr' 1900g. Izvestiya Imperatorskoy Akademii Nauk. St. Petersburg 1901.
- Russkaya polyarnaya expeditsia pod nachal'stvom barona Tollya. Izvestiya Imperatorskago Russkago Geographicheskago Obschestva. St. Petersburg 1901.
- Chernoviki zaveschaniia. Paris 1924.

== See also ==
- Zarya (polar ship)
- Vladimir Nabokov & Nabokov House – N.N. Kolomeitsev was related to the Nabokov family by his marriage to Nina Dmitrievna Nabokov
