= Russky Island (Kara Sea) =

Island in the Kara Sea

Coordinates: 77°03′N 96°30′E

Native name: Ру́сский о́стров
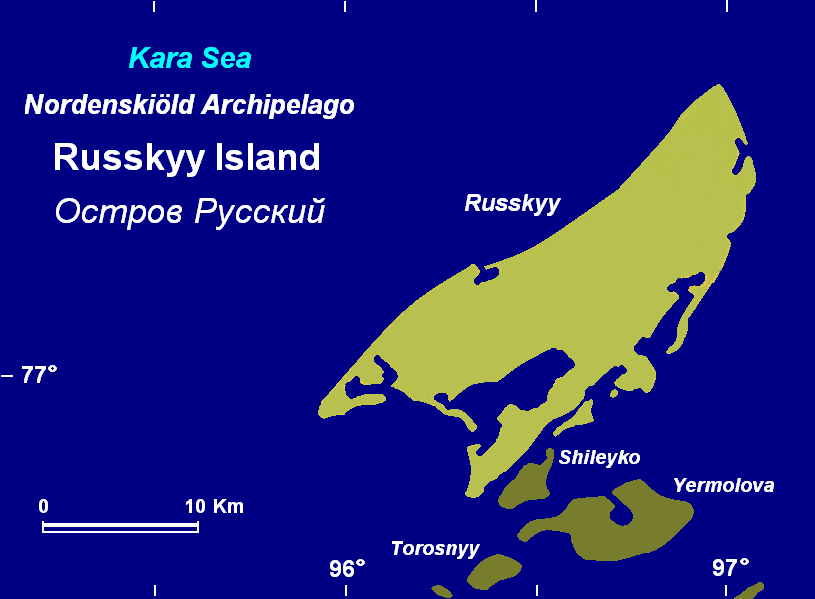
- Map of Russky Island

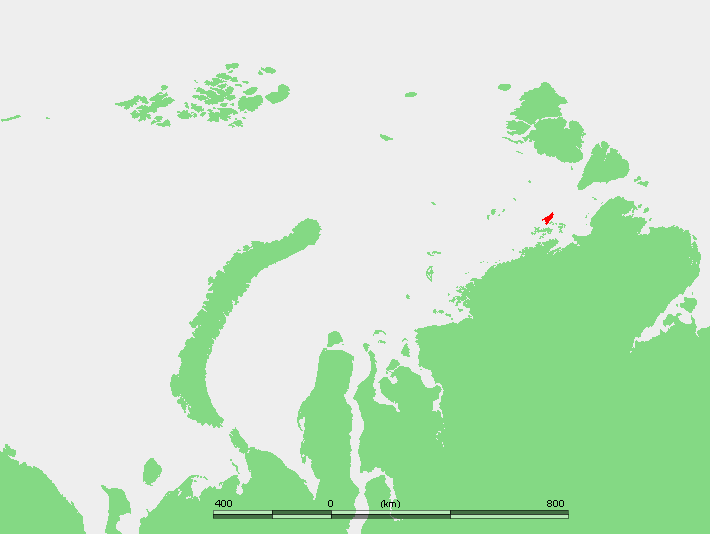
- Location of Russky Island in the Kara Sea

Geography
- Location: Kara Sea
- Archipelago: Nordenskiöld Archipelago
- Total islands: 1
- Area: 309 km^{2} (119 sq mi)

Administration
- Russia
- Krai: Krasnoyarsk Krai

Demographics
- Population: 0

Russky Island (Russian: Ру́сский о́стров, lit. 'Russian Island'), also spelt Russkyy and Russkiy, is an island in the Kara Sea. It is located in the Litke Islands subgroup of the Nordenskiöld Archipelago.

== Geography ==
With an area of 309 km^{2}, Russky is the biggest island in the whole archipelago. At a latitude of 77° 03' N, it is also the northernmost island of the group. The climate in the northernmost end of the archipelago is severe, and the sea surrounding Russky Island is covered with fast ice in the winter and often obstructed by pack ice even in the Arctic summer.

Administratively Russky Island belongs to the Krasnoyarsk Krai, of the Russian Federation. It is also part of the Great Arctic State Nature Reserve, the largest nature reserve of Russia.

== History ==
In 1935, during Soviet times, an Arctic station was established in Russky Island. This outpost was part of the building of a modern polar station network undertaken by the Chief Directorate of the Northern Sea Route (GUSMP) between 1932 and 1940. Besides taking meteorological measurements, the purpose of Russky Island's station was to monitor Arctic navigation along the Northern Sea Route. One of the route's branches coming from the Vilkitsky Strait passed right off Russky Island's NW shores. For many years this lonely Arctic station was the only permanently inhabited place in the whole Nordenskiöld Archipelago.

In 1939, the workers of the Russky Island station made the measuring of the ice layer and the height of embacles (accumulated broken ice) on the perpendicular to the bank section as a present to the 18th Congress of the Communist Party of the Soviet Union.

On 25 August 1942, during Operation Wunderland, Kriegsmarine heavy cruiser Admiral Scheer fell upon the Russian icebreaker Sibiryakov (under the command of Captain Kacharev) right off the northwest coast of Russky Island while prowling the waters off the northern end of the Nordenskiöld Archipelago. The Sibiryakov was sunk in an unequal battle. Then Admiral Scheer headed southwest in order to attack the Soviet military installations at Dikson.

Scientific research on Russky Island, including the monitoring of animal species on the island (lemming, purple sandpiper, turnstone, sanderling, and little stint) was conducted after the breakup of the Soviet Union, but the Arctic station was closed in 1999.

== See also ==
- List of islands of Russia
- List of research stations in the Arctic
