= Zarya (polar ship) =

Steam- and sail-powered brig used by the Russian Academy of Sciences

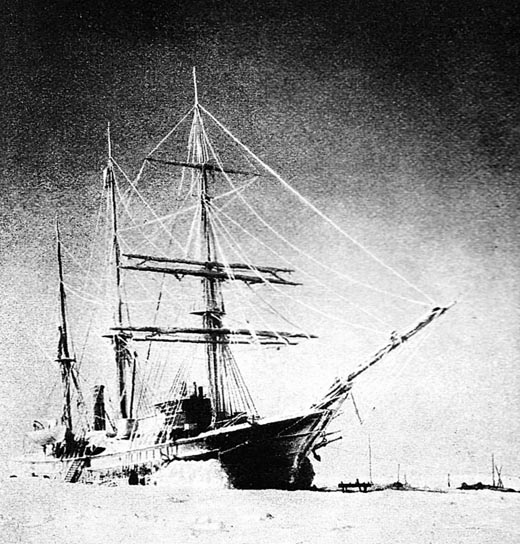
- Zarya in 1902 during her second wintering

History

Norway
- Name: Harald Harfager
- Builder: Brinchs Verft, Oslo, Norway
- Launched: 1873

Russia
- Name: Zarya
- Owner: Russian Academy of Sciences
- Builder: Brinchs Verft, Oslo, Norway
- Cost: Purchased for ₽60,000
- Launched: 1873
- Acquired: 1899
- Commissioned: 1900
- Decommissioned: 1902
- In service: 1900
- Out of service: 1902
- Fate: Sunk by her crew and abandoned due to having suffered too much damage

General characteristics
- Class & type: Barque
- Displacement: 450 tonnes
- Draught: 5 m
- Propulsion: Steam engine
- Sail plan: barkentine
- Complement: Crew of 20
- Armament: None

Zarya (Russian: Заря, Sunrise or Dawn) was a steam- and sail-powered brig used by the Russian Academy of Sciences for a polar exploration during 1900–1903.

== History ==
Toward the end of the 19th century, the Russian Academy of Sciences sought to build a general-purpose research vessel for long-term expeditions. The first such Russian ship—and, for a couple of decades, the only one—was Zarya. In 1899, Baron Eduard Toll, an Arctic explorer preparing to embark on a new polar voyage, bought a Norwegian three-masted barque called Harald Harfager (the nickname of a King of Norway) for the cost of 60,000 rubles. Toll was helped in his choice by Fridtjof Nansen, who recommended to use a ship similar to his Fram. The ship had a displacement of 450 tonnes and a draught of 5 meters.

Renamed Zarya, the ship was sent to the shipyard of Colin Archer in Larvik to be heavily modified in order to deal with the ice. Colin Archer, the renowned Norwegian shipbuilder, had designed and built Fritdjof Nansen's ship Fram, which in 1896 had returned unscathed from its long drift in the northern polar ocean during Nansen's "Farthest North" expedition, 1893–96. Archer had also fitted out Southern Cross for the Southern Cross Expedition in 1897 to become a polar ship. Archer strengthened Zarja heavily with internal frames and beams and deckhouses were added and modified. The rig was changed to barkentine (square sail on foremast only). In October 1899 the ship was certified by Norwegian authorities for a three-year expedition in the Arctic.

=== Russian Polar Expedition ===
On June 21, 1900, Zarya left Saint Petersburg with a crew of 20. N. N. Kolomeitsev was the commander of the ship. On July 24 she arrived at the harbour of Alexandrovsk on Murman (today Polyarny) and then continued toward the Kara Sea. Zarya made her first wintering trapped in the ice of a bay that Toll named after Colin Archer shipyard (Bukhta Kolin Archera) near Taymyr Island. The scientists spent 11 months researching the Nordenskiöld Archipelago and the Taymyr Peninsula coast. In the spring Kolomeitsev was sent on a long sledge trip by expedition leader Eduard Toll, and at this point second-in-command, Fyodor Andreyevich Matisen became the captain for the remaining part of the expedition. Member of the expedition was Aleksandr Kolchak.

In August 1901 the ship headed across the Laptev Sea towards the New Siberian Islands, searching for the legendary Sannikov Land (Zemlya Sannikova), but was soon blocked by floating pack ice. During 1902 the attempts to reach Sannikov Land continued while Zarya was trapped in fast ice. Leaving the ship, Baron Toll and three companions went in search of the elusive land, one of the main objects of the expedition. They vanished in November 1902 while travelling away from Bennett Island towards the south on loose ice floes.

Badly beaten by the ice, and beyond any hope of repair, Zarya was finally moored east of the delta of the river Lena, in the Bay of Tiksi on the lee side of Brusneva Island, never to leave the place again. Instead of the Russian flag, she flew the flag of the Neva Yacht Club, the oldest yacht club in Russia, until she was stripped of all equipment and her hull was allowed to fill with water. Captain Matisen returned to Yakutsk and the remaining members of the expedition left for Saint Petersburg.

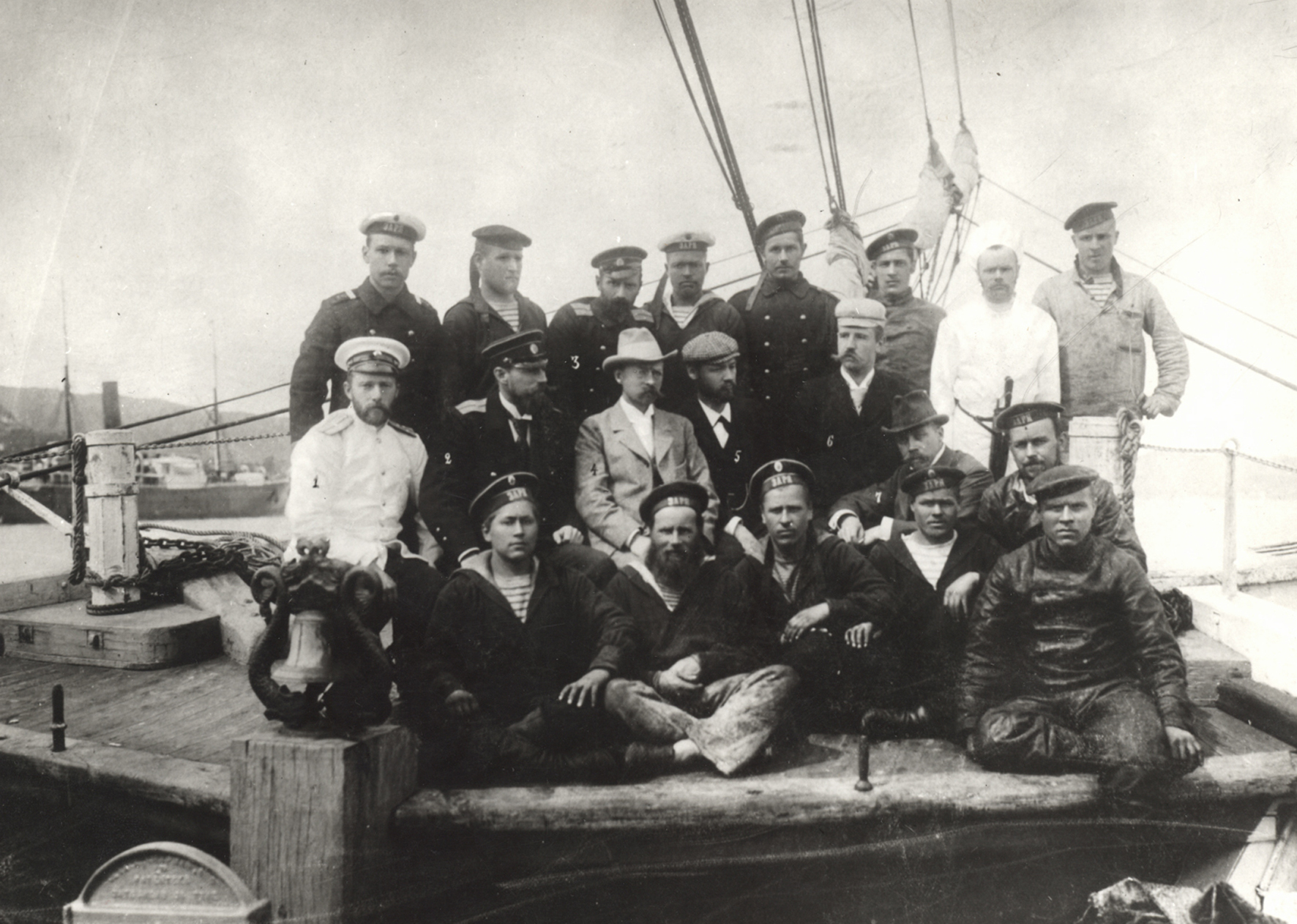
Crew of Zarya

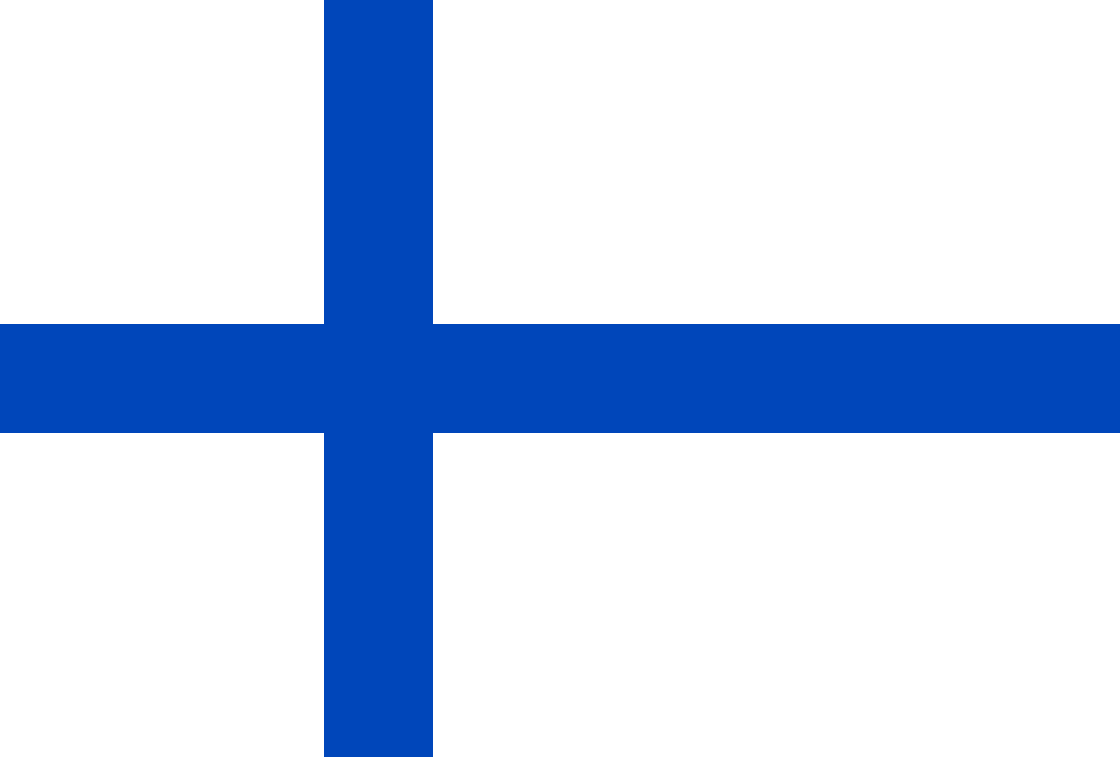
Instead of the Russian flag, Zarya flew this flag of the Neva Yacht Club until her last moments. The flag of Finland is based on this flag.

== Honours ==
Today, the city museum in Polyarny, Russia keeps documents and artifacts related to the expedition.

An island in the vicinity of Cape Chelyuskin (Остров Заря) at 77°37′N 104°24′E, as well as a peninsula east of the Middendorff Bay (полуостров Заря) and the strait between Belkovsky Island and Kotelny Island were named Zarya to commemorate this Russian polar ship.
