= Taymyr Island =

Island in the Kara Sea

Native name: Russian: Остров Таймыр
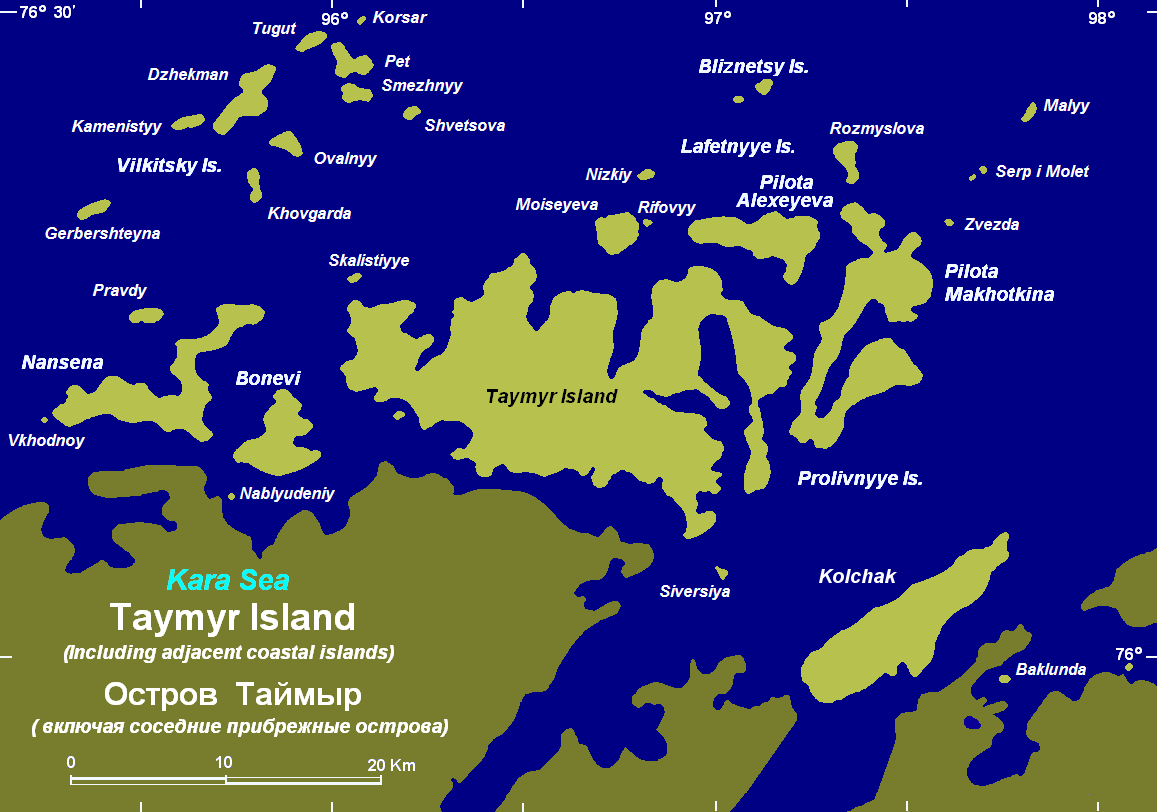

- Location within Nordenskiöld Archipelago

Geography
- Location: Kara Sea, Arctic Ocean, Asia
- Coordinates: 76°12′N 96°0′E
- Archipelago: Nordenskiöld Archipelago
- Length: 33 km (20.5 mi)
- Width: 10 km (6 mi)

Administration
- Russia

Demographics
- Population: 0

Taymyr Island (Russian: Остров Таймыр, romanized: Ostrov Taymyr) is a large island in the coast of the Kara Sea. Its length is 33 km (21 mi) and its average width about 10 km (6.2 mi). This island is located west of the Taymyr Gulf in an area of skerries right off the western coast of the Taymyr Peninsula. The narrow strait between Taymyr island and the Siberian coast is called Proliv Taymyrskiy It is about 3 km (1.9 mi) wide on average.

== Geography ==
Taymyr Island is one of the islands of the coastal area of the Nordenskiöld Archipelago. The shores of Taymyr Island and some of its larger neighboring islands, such as Nansena, Bonevi and Pilota Makhotkina, are deeply indented, with many crooked inlets. The sounds between this island and neighboring islands are also somewhat labyrinthic. Geologically all these coastal islands are a continuation of the Nordenskiöld Archipelago which lies further north. Hovgaard Island, the closest island of the Nordenskiöld Archipelago lies 10.8 kilometers (6.7 mi) northwest of the NW point of Taymyr Island across the Matisen Strait.

The sea surrounding Taymyr Island is covered with pack ice with some polynias during the long and bitter winters and there are many ice floes even in the Arctic summer.

Taymyr Island belongs to the Krasnoyarsk Krai administrative division of Russia and is part of the Great Arctic State Nature Reserve – the largest nature reserve of Russia and one of the biggest in the world.

== History ==
In October 1900, during Baron Eduard von Toll’s last expedition, winter quarters for ship Zarya were set at Nablyudeniy Island and a scientific station was built there. This is a small granite island southwest of Taymyr Island, located in a bay that Baron Toll named Bukhta Kolin Archera (Colin Archer Bay), after the shipyard where Zarya had been built.

In some maps Taymyr Island is named simply as Taymyra.

== See also ==
- Kara Sea
- List of islands of Russia
- Taymyr Strait
