= Tiksi Bay =

Bay of the Laptev Sea

- Бухта Тикси (Russian)
- Map showing the location of Tiksi Bay
- Location: Far North
- Coordinates: 71°39′N 129°8′E
- River sources: Sogo River, Yuryage River
- Ocean/sea sources: Laptev Sea
- Basin countries: Russia
- Max. length: 21 km (13 mi)
- Max. width: 17 km (11 mi)
- Average depth: 11 m (36 ft)
- Settlements: Tiksi

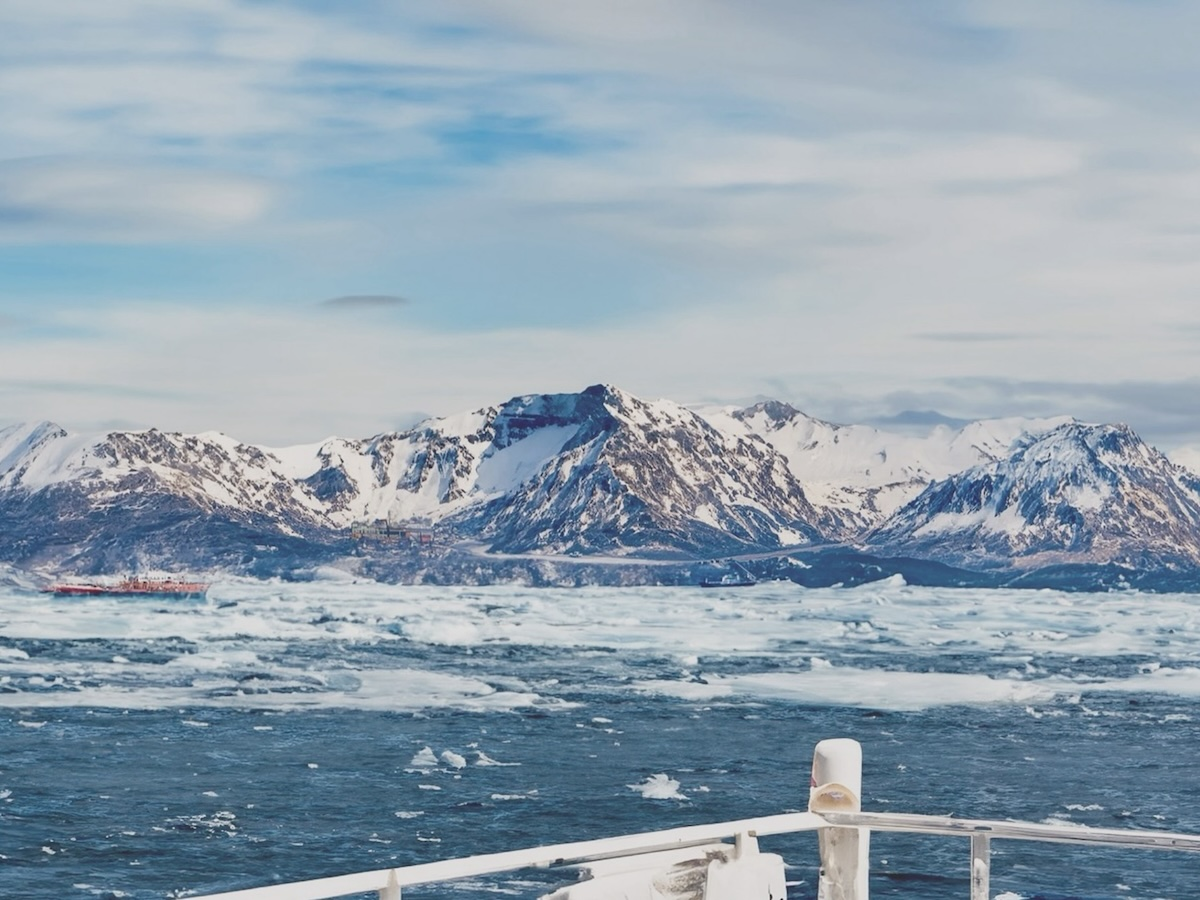

Tiksi Bay (Russian: Бухта Тикси, Bukhta Tiksi) is a bay of the Laptev Sea that cuts into the northern part of the Sakha Republic, Russia.

== History ==
This bay was first surveyed by Russian Arctic explorer Dmitry Laptev in 1739. It was then called "Gorely Bay". The name "Tiksi Bay" was adopted in 1878.

There is a cross at Tiksi Bay marking the place of death of U. S. whaling captain Thomas Long.

== Geography ==
The bay is up to 21 km long, 17 km wide and has a depth of 2 to 11 metres. The Sogo and Yuryage Rivers discharge into the bay.

The port of Tiksi lies on the west side.

Semidiurnal tides in the Kola Bay are about 0.3 metres. In winter the bay is clogged by ice.
