= Taymyr =

Taymyr or Taimyr may refer to:

== Places ==
- Taymyr Peninsula, a peninsula in Siberia
- Taymyr Gulf
- Taymyra, a river in the Taymyr Peninsula
- Lake Taymyr
- Taymyr Island, an island in the Kara Sea
- Taymyr Autonomous Okrug, a former federal subject of Russia

== Transportation ==
- Taymyr (icebreaker), "Taymyr" ship name used for icebreakers
  - Taymyr (1909 icebreaker), a steam-powered icebreaker
  - Taymyr class nuclear icebreaker
    - Taymyr (1987 icebreaker), a nuclear-powered shallow draft icebreaker

== See also ==
- Maly Taymyr Island, an island in the Laptev Sea
- Taymyrsky Dolgano-Nenetsky District
