= Toll (noble family) =

Baltic German noble family

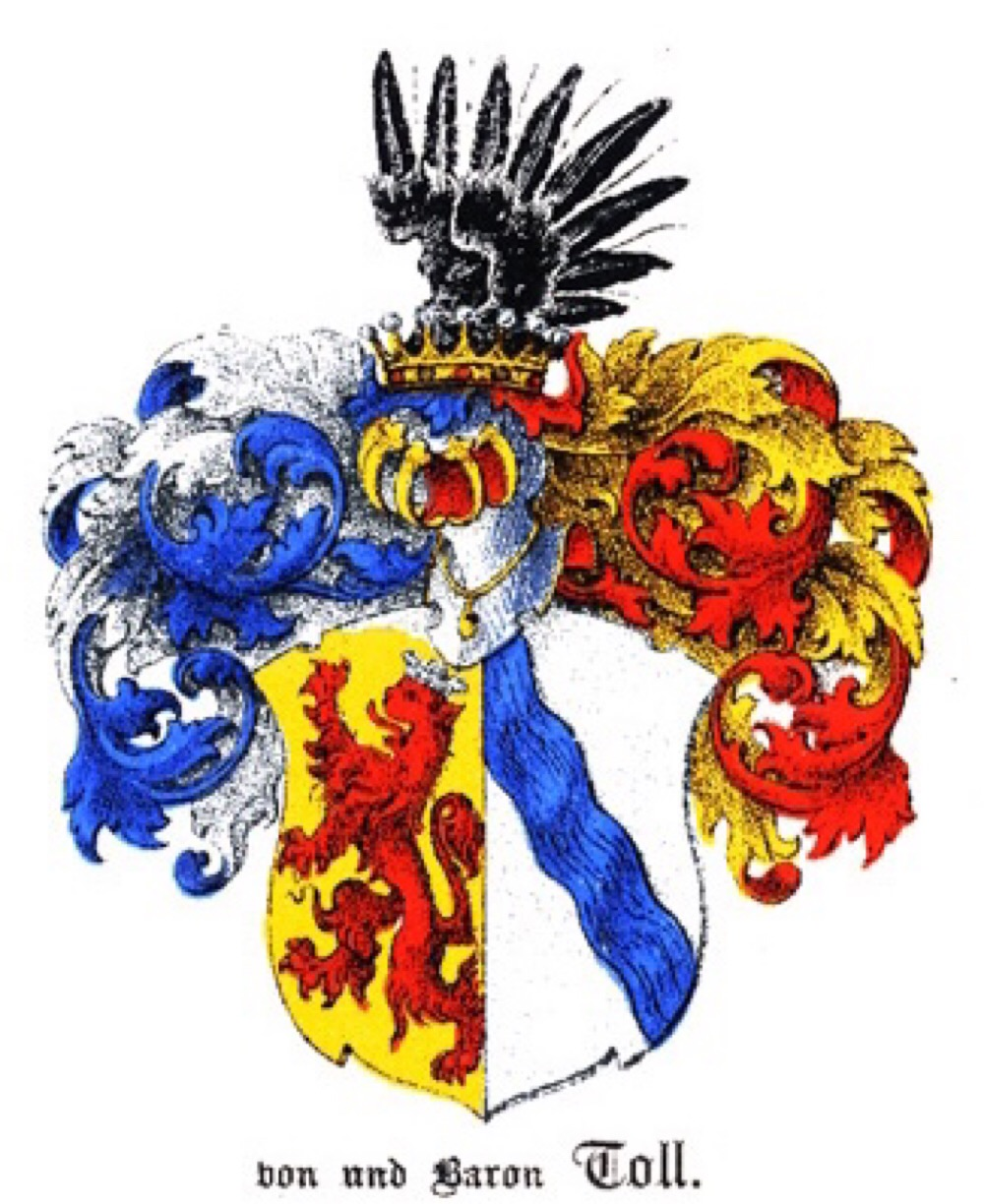
Coat of arms of the untitled and baronial Toll family, which belonged to the Uradel, in the Baltic Coat of arms book by Carl Arvid von Klingspor in 1882.

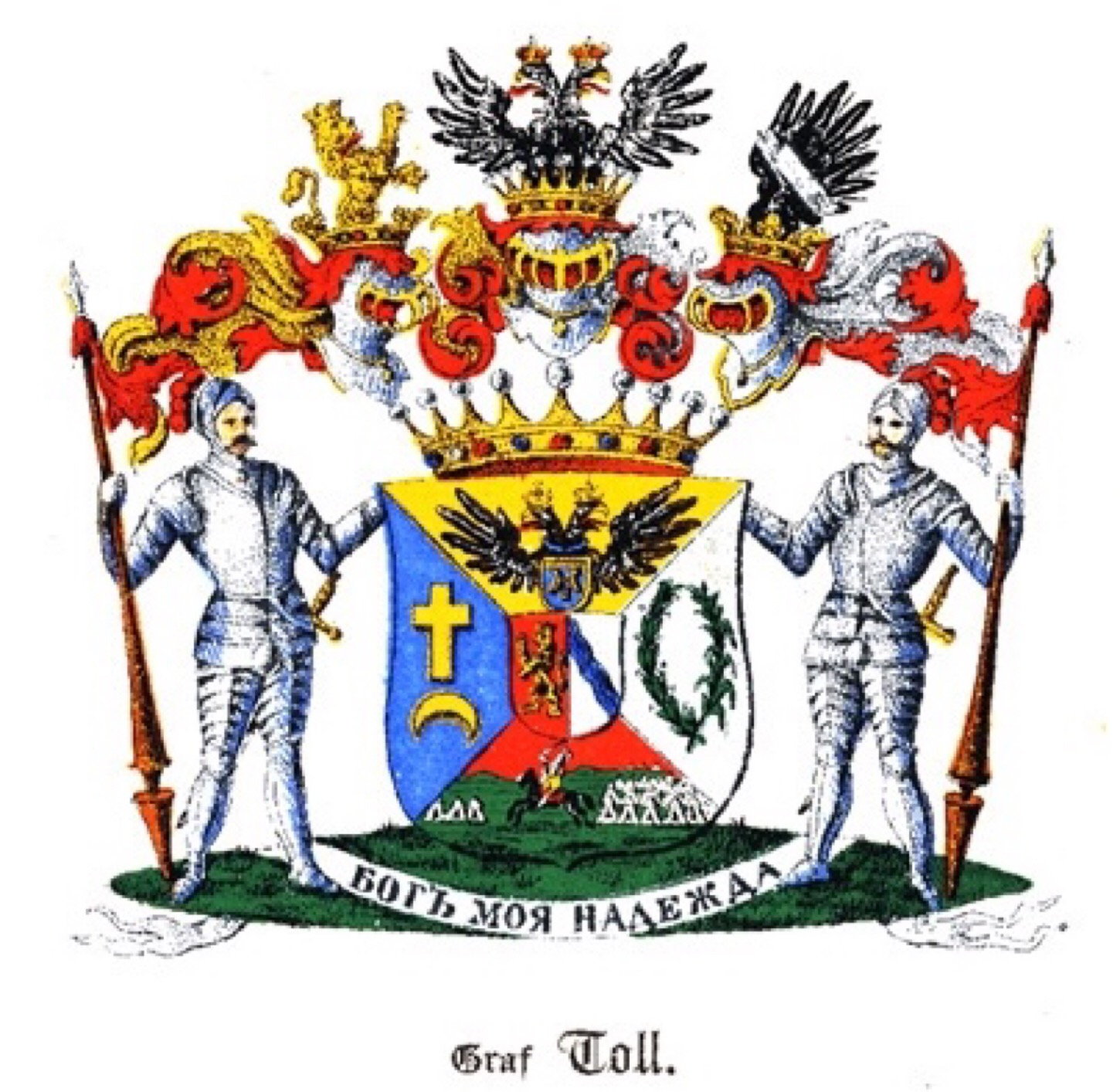
Coat of arms of the Russian comital Toll family of 1829, in the Baltic Coat of arms by Carl Arvid Klingspor in 1882.

The Toll family was a Baltic German noble family of possible Hollandish origin. According to legend, the family's name originated from a castle near Leiden. The family held Swedish and Russian baronial and comital titles, Austrian baronial titles, Prussian, Oldenburgish, Finnish untitled noble status and also possibly belonged to Dutch nobility.

== History ==
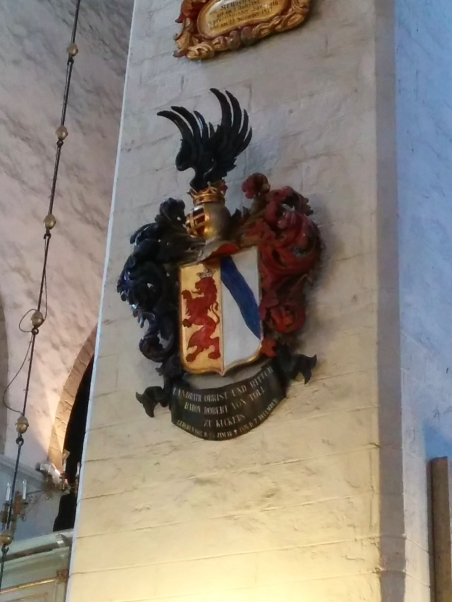
Coat of arms of the family at St. Mary's Cathedral in Tallinn, 2014.

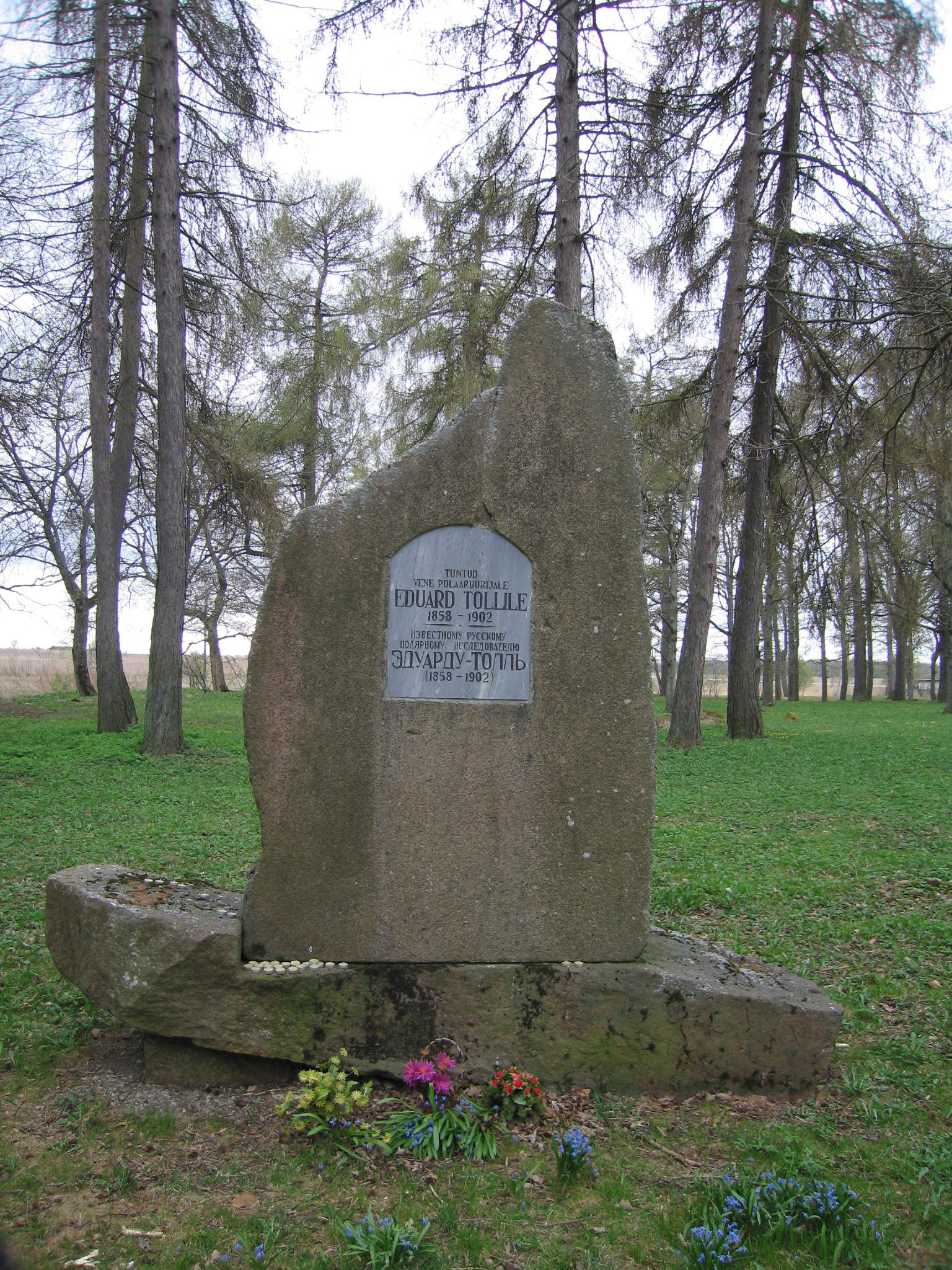
A memorial stone to Eduard von Toll in the cemetery of the former family estate in Kukruse.

The origin of the Toll family was debated among genealogists and historians. According to the Genealogical Handbook of the Baltic Knighthoods, Part Estonia by Baron Otto Magnus von Stackelberg and Genealogical Handbook of the Oesel Knighthoods by Nicolai von Essen, the family was of Saxon origin and was originated in Wittenberg. But others including the family members themselves insisted that the family was of Hollandish origin. In the Baltic Coat of Arms Book by Carl Arvid Klingspor and The introduction to the Swedish nobility's tables by Gustaf Elgenatierna, the family could trace their origins back to the medieval County of Holland, from which they were descended from a branch of the Teylingen family, a noble family which played a significant role in the County of Holland during the Middle Ages. The Tolls claimed to have descended from Willem van Teylingen, the brother of Dirk I van Brederode, whose son Floris was granted a castle from his merit which he named Tol, and according to the family, that castle was what the family was named after.

Floris' descendants gradually moved east, and in the 16th century, Oswald Toll moved to Wittenberg. His son Lucas was the main ancestor of the Toll family, he was a student at the University of Wittenberg, which later he became a writer and went to Denmark, he also became an officer under Duke Magnus of Holstein. After the Bishoprics of Ösel–Wiek and Courland was sold to Frederick II of Denmark and Duke Magnus became the king of the newly established Kingdom of Livonia, Toll followed him and received a number of land there. Lucas Toll then settled in one of his estates and continued his writing.

=== Finland-Swedish line ===
Lucas Toll's descendants divided into many branches, his family was originally based in Ösel (modern-day Saaremaa), many family members moved inland, settling in places such as Estonia and Sweden, and further dividing the family into more branches. His descendants were mainly descended from four of his grandsons, Christian (1607-1675) of the House of Medel-Arromois-Piddul, Caspar (died 1651) of the House of Kuusnõmme, Christoffer (1616-1686) of the House of Karky-Wesseldorf and Friedrich of the House of Arromois, which their descendants further divided into house which were named after their manor houses. The Swedish line was mainly descended from Caspar and Friedrich. One of Caspar's son Ebbe Christoph von Toll moved inland and entered Swedish service. Ebbe Christoph's grandson was the Swedish field marshal Johan Christopher Toll. The Swedish line was introduced into Swedish nobility in 1722, thanks to his merit, Johan Christopher Toll received respectively baronial (1799) and comital titles (1814) during his military career. As he was unmarried, the comital branch was extinct by the time of his death in 1817. Other Swedish branches continued, but also went extinct in 1880 with the death of Nikolai Alexander von Toll as his only son Alexander Nikolai died during childhood.

=== Baltic lines ===
The Baltic lines was mainly descended from Christian, Christoffer and Friedrich. The subdivided houses which were most prominent were the House of Kuckers and the House of Arroküll. The Kuckers branch was descended from the Medel-Arromois-Piddul branch and was founded by Christian Wilhelm von Toll (1720-1802). His grandson Adolf Friedrich von Toll (1773-1803) was the father of Arndt Wilhelm Gustav (1800-1863) and Robert von Toll (1802-1876), older brother Arndt Wilhelm Gustav was a supervisor in a supply fortress in Pskov. While younger brother Robert was a military officer in the Imperial Russian Army, a landlord and historian in Baltic German history. Together with Friedrich Georg von Bunge and a number of Baltic German historians, he was best remembered as one of the authors of the Est- und livländische Brieflade, a four-part historical source about the timeline and history of Estonia and Livonia. Robert's son Harald Alexander Christian von Toll (1848-1909) was a city councilor and secretary to the head of the nobility. The most famous member of this line was the explorer and geologist Eduard Gustav von Toll (1858-1902), he gained fame for exploring the Northern Atlantic, Arctic Ocean, Siberia and the most famous Russian polar expedition of 1900–1902 of the legendary Sannikov Land, he was lost during that expedition and was never heard from since.

The other branch the House of Arroküll was descended from the Karky-Wesseldorf branch and was found by the Napoleonic-Era general Karl Wilhelm von Toll, notable for his role during the War of the Sixth Coalition. He found and named this branch after the Arroküll Manor he brought in 1820. Karl Wilhelm was granted Austrian baronial title in 1814 and Russian comital title in 1829. His son, also Karl Wilhelm, was a diplomat, chamberlain and privy councillor, he was the Russian ambassador to Denmark from 1882 to 1893. He was also the ancestor of several minor Russian branches, even though he, his wife and his children were all baptised in Lutheran churches, many of them had their own children baptised in Orthodox churches because of their marriages with Russian Orthodox woman. One such descendant was his grandson Sergei Alexandrovich Tol (1848-1923), the civil governor of St. Petersburg for 14 years from 1889 to 1903 and premier master of the hunt. Other lines included the House of Kuckers-Etz and the House of Undel-Thula.

The Baltic family was matriculated into the Baltic knighthoods during the course of the 18th-Century. In 1741, Ebbe Ludwig von Toll (1722-1810), landowner and heir to the Arromois and Paunküll Manors was matriculated into the Oeselian Knighthood. Christoffer Friedrich von Toll (1698-1767), landowner, heir to the Alt-Harm Manor and father of the founder of the Kuckers-Etz branch Karl Gustav von Toll (1751-1820), was matriculated into the Estonian and Livonian Knighthoods in 1746 and 1747 respectively.

=== Prussian and Oldenburgish lines ===
Some of the family members also returned to Germany for services. This line was mainly descended from Friedrich Toll.

== Sources ==
- Essen, Nicolai von (1935). Genealogisches Handbuch der Oeselschen Ritterschaft (in German). Tartu. pp. 361–384.
- Hupel, August Wilhelm (1788). Nordische Miscellaneen: Materialien zu einer liefländischen (livländischen) Adelsgeschichte. Teil 15-17 (in German). Riga. pp. 266–271.
- Klingspor, Carl Arvid von (1882). Baltisches Wappenbuch Wappen sämmtlicher, den Ritterschaften von Livland, Estland, Kurland und Oesel zugehörigen Adelsgeschlechter (in German). Stockholm. p. 93 & 223.
- Stackelberg, Otto Magnus von (1930). Genealogische Handbuch der baltischen Ritterschaften. Teil Estland, Band I (in German). Starke Verlag, Görlitz. pp. 422–439.
- Gothaisches Genealogisches Taschenbuch der Freiherrlichen Häuser (in German). Justus Perthes, Gotha. 1879. pp. 860–861.
- Deutschbaltisches Biographisches Lexikon (in German). Buchhandlung v. Hirschheydt, Wedemark. 1998. pp. 806–808.
