= Rastorguyev =

Rastorguyev or Rastorguev may refer to

- Rastorguyev (surname)
- Rastorguev Glacier in Antarctica
- Rastorguyev Island in the Kara Sea in Russia
- Rastorguyev-Kharitonov Palace in Yekaterinburg, Russia
