= Kolchak Island =

Island in the Kara Sea, Russia

Coordinates: 76°07′N 97°01′E

Native name: остров Колчака
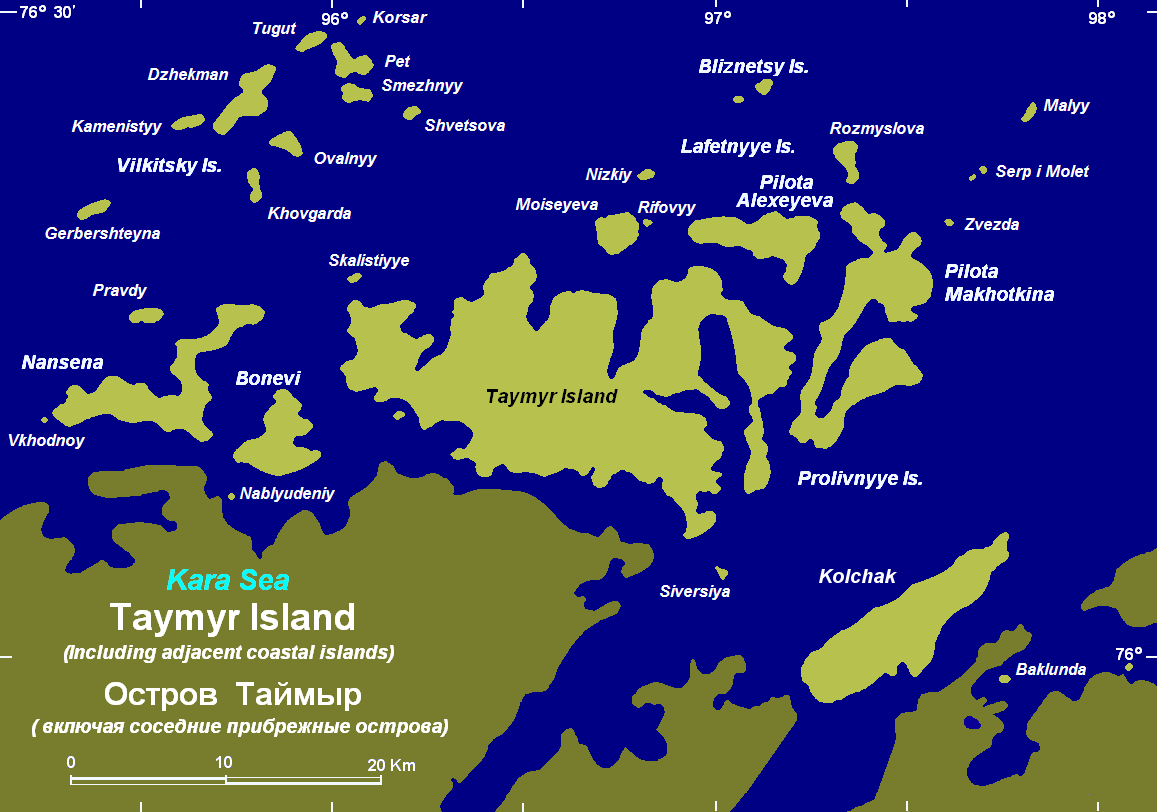
- Map of the Taymyr group.

Geography
- Location: Kara Sea
- Length: 21 km (13 mi)
- Width: 6.5 km (4.04 mi)

Administration
- Russia
- Krai: Krasnoyarsk Krai

Demographics
- Population: uninhabited

Kolchak Island or Kolchaka Island (Russian: остров Колчака, ostrov Kolchaka, 'Kolchak's island'), is an island in the Kara Sea located in a coastal area of skerries southeast of Taymyr Island.

It was known as Rastorguyev Island (Russian: остров Расторгуева, ostrov Rastorguyeva) in the period between 1937 and 2005 .

== Description ==
Compared to other large islands in the area Kolchak has a quite regular shape. Its length is 21 km and its maximum width 6.5 km. It is covered with tundra vegetation in the summer, but most of the year it lies under a shroud of snow.

Kolchak Island is located 40 km from the western end of the Taymyr Gulf and only 14 km southeast of Taymyr Island. It separated from the nearest coast by a narrow sound that is about one km in width in its narrowest stretch.

The climate in the area is severe, with long and bitter winters and frequent blizzards and gales. The sea surrounding Kolchak Island is covered with pack ice in the winter and there are numerous ice floes even in the summer, so that most of the year it is merged with the mainland.

Kolchak Island belongs to the Krasnoyarsk Krai administrative division of the Russian Federation and is part of the Great Arctic State Nature Reserve, the largest nature reserve of Russia.

Kolchak Monument on Kolchak Island.

== History ==
This island is named after Alexander Kolchak, its discoverer and explorer. He had joined Eduard Toll's 1900-1902 arctic expedition (The Russian Polar Expedition), which explored many little-known islands of the Kara Sea. The main aim of the expedition was to find the legendary Sannikov Land.

Kolchak Island was first depicted on a map in 1901. In 1937 the Soviet government renamed it after Stepan Rastorguyev and for a few decades there were two Rastorguyev Islands in the Kara Sea, the other of which was in the Kamennyye group. Finally, on July 15, 2005 the island was renamed to Kolchak Island.

In 2009, a monument to Kolchak was erected on Sluchevsky Cape (мыс Случевского), the northernmost part of the island.

== See also ==
- Eduard Toll
- Kamennyye Islands
- Nikifor Begichev
- The Last Journey of Peter Tessem and Paul Knutsen
