= Viktor Chernomyrdin (icebreaker) =

Russian icebreaker

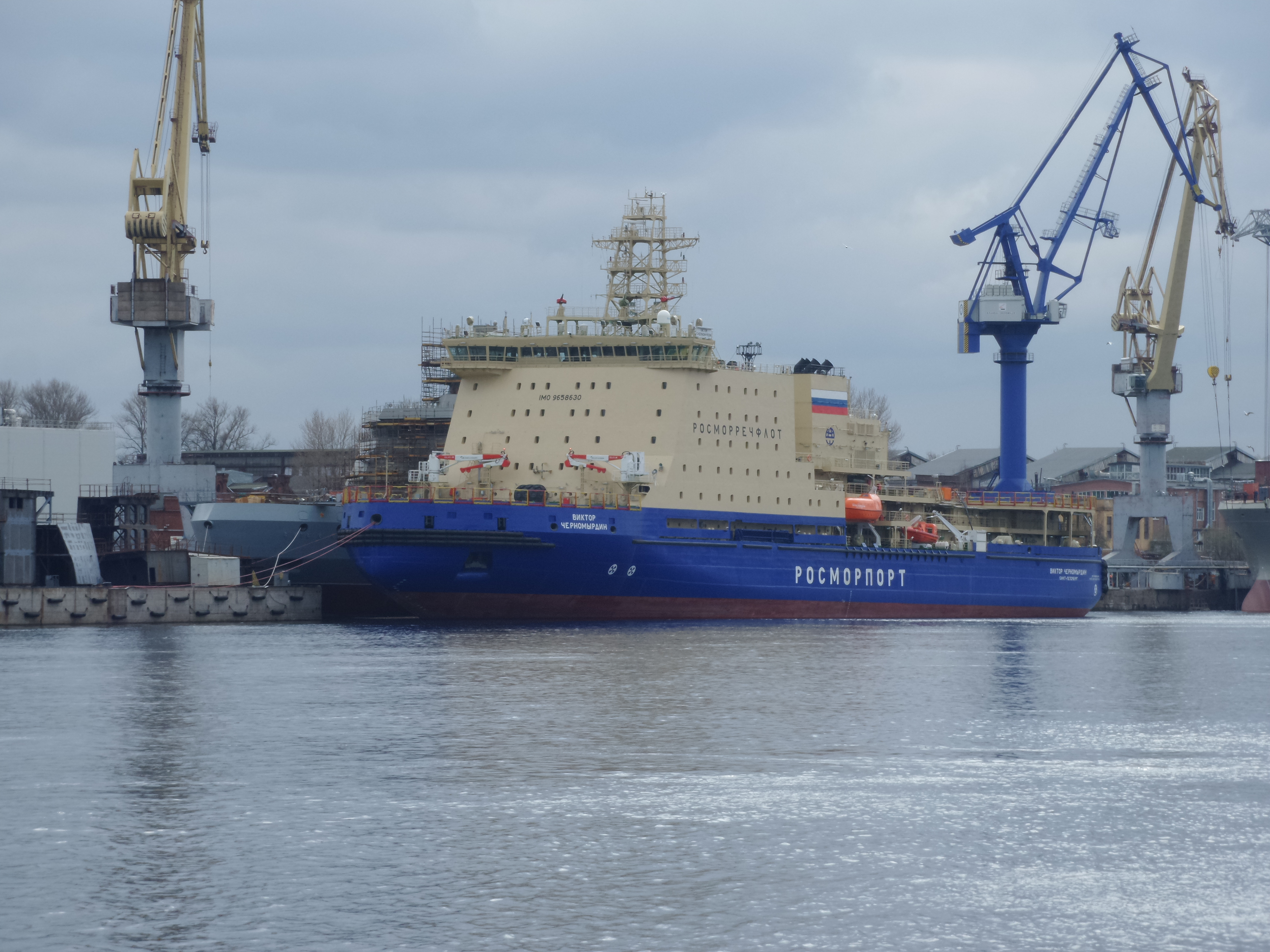
- Viktor Chernomyrdin awaiting delivery at Admiralty Shipyard in Saint Petersburg in April 2020

History

Russia
- Name: Viktor Chernomyrdin; (Виктор Черномырдин)
- Namesake: Viktor Chernomyrdin
- Owner: Rosmorport
- Port of registry: Saint Petersburg, Russia
- Ordered: 2 December 2011
- Builder: Baltic Shipyard, St. Petersburg, Russia; Admiralty Shipyard, St. Petersburg, Russia (outfitting)
- Cost: RUB 7.94 billion (contract); RUB 12 billion (2019 estimate); RUB 14.6 billion (2021 estimate)
- Yard number: 05620
- Laid down: 10 October 2012
- Launched: 30 December 2016
- Completed: December 2015 (contract date); 30 September 2020 (delivery certificate signed); 3 November 2020 (commissioning ceremony)
- Identification: IMO number: 9658630; MMSI number: 273428690; Call sign: UDAH
- Status: In service

General characteristics
- Type: Icebreaker
- Tonnage: 20,431 GT; 7,000 DWT
- Displacement: Approximately 22,000 tonnes
- Length: 146.8 m (482 ft)
- Beam: 29 m (95 ft) (maximum); 28.5 m (94 ft) (waterline)
- Draft: 8.5–9.5 m (28–31 ft) (design); 9.7 m (32 ft) (maximum)
- Ice class: RMRS Icebreaker8
- Installed power: Four diesel engines (4 × 8,700 kW)
- Propulsion: Diesel-electric; centerline shaft (10 MW) and two ABB Azipod VI1600 propulsion units (2 × 7.5 MW)
- Speed: 17 knots (31 km/h; 20 mph) (maximum); 2 knots (3.7 km/h; 2.3 mph) in 2 m (7 ft) ice
- Endurance: 60 days
- Capacity: Accommodation for 90 special personnel
- Crew: 38
- Aviation facilities: Two helipads and hangar for two helicopters

Viktor Chernomyrdin (Russian: Виктор Черномырдин), also known through her Russian design number Project 22600 or type size series designation LK-25, (Note: The type size series designation "LK-25" (Russian: ЛК-25) comes from the Russian language word for "icebreaker" (Russian: ледокол, romanized: ledokol) and the propulsion power (25 megawatts).) is a Russian icebreaker. Launched at Baltic Shipyard and outfitted at Admiralty Shipyard in Saint Petersburg, she is the largest and most powerful diesel-electric icebreaker built in Russia.

The construction of the 7.94 billion ruble icebreaker was awarded to Baltic Shipyard in December 2011. Initially expected to enter service in late 2015, the vessel was completed several years behind schedule and over budget. In 2017, it was announced that the unfinished vessel would be moved to nearby Admiralty Shipyard for outfitting in order to speed up the delivery. Due to a fire on board the vessel in November 2018 and a disagreement over the increased cost of the icebreaker, the delivery of Viktor Chernomyrdin was postponed to late 2020.

== Development and construction ==
=== Background ===
The development of the icebreaker designated as LK-25 dates back to the first long-term plans for rebuilding the Russian icebreaker fleet after the dissolution of the Soviet Union. As part of these plans that were published in the early 1990s, a number of both conventional and nuclear-powered icebreaker icebreaker type size series were developed, ranging from 7-megawatt auxiliary icebreakers (LK-7) operating near large ports to 110-megawatt nuclear icebreakers (LK-110Ya) capable of breaking ice up to 3.5 metres (11 ft) thick. Of these, the 25-megawatt line icebreakers (LK-25) were intended to escort merchant ships and lead convoys through freezing seas, and operate as auxiliary ships in complex convoys along the Northern Sea Route. During the summer season, they could also escort ships independently over shallow waters in the Arctic.

While an early LK-25 concept was presented already in the 1990s, the current design, Project 22600, was developed in 2008 by the Russian Petrobalt Design Bureau in co-operation with the Finnish Aker Arctic who had developed the hybrid propulsion configuration and carried out model-scale tests for the concept.

=== Shipbuilding contract and start of construction ===
Following the challenging winter navigating season of 2010–2011, during which ice conditions in the Baltic Sea became so severe that Russia was forced to call in the nuclear-powered icebreaker Vaygach from Murmansk to escort ships in the eastern Gulf of Finland, the Russian government decided to include a 25-megawatt diesel-electric icebreaker to the federal program Development of the Transport System of Russia (2010–2020). On 2 December 2011, Rosmorport and St. Petersburg-based Baltic Shipyard signed a contract, worth RUB 7.94 billion of which 30% was paid in advance, for the construction of the new line icebreaker. The keel-laying ceremony, attended by Prime Minister Dmitry Medvedev, was held on 10 October 2012. The construction of the 2,500-ton deckhouse was subcontracted to Nordic Yards in Germany. The ship was initially expected to enter service in the Gulf of Finland in December 2015 and replace two older icebreakers, the 1974-built Ermak and the 1977-built Kapitan Sorokin.

The new icebreaker would be named after Viktor Chernomyrdin (1938–2010), the founder and first chairman of Gazprom and the former Prime Minister of Russia (1992–1998).

=== Construction suspended due to design issues ===
In November 2014, it was reported that the construction of the icebreaker had been suspended already in December 2013 due to problems with the design — the vessel was reportedly 2,500 tons overweight and subsequently the draft had increased by 0.7 metres (2.3 ft) — and the delivery had been delayed by 24 to 28 months until July 2017. An expert working group established by Baltic Shipyard found discrepancies between the technical project documentation developed by Petrobalt Design Bureau and the structural drawings prepared by Iceberg Central Design Bureau, resulting in significant increase in steel weight. The shipyard then contracted another Russian company, Vympel Design Bureau, to modify the design so that the increase in draft would be limited to 15 to 20 centimetres (6 to 8 in). The 30 million euro contract with Nordic Yards for the construction of the superstructure was also cancelled.

=== Russian financial crisis and international sanctions ===
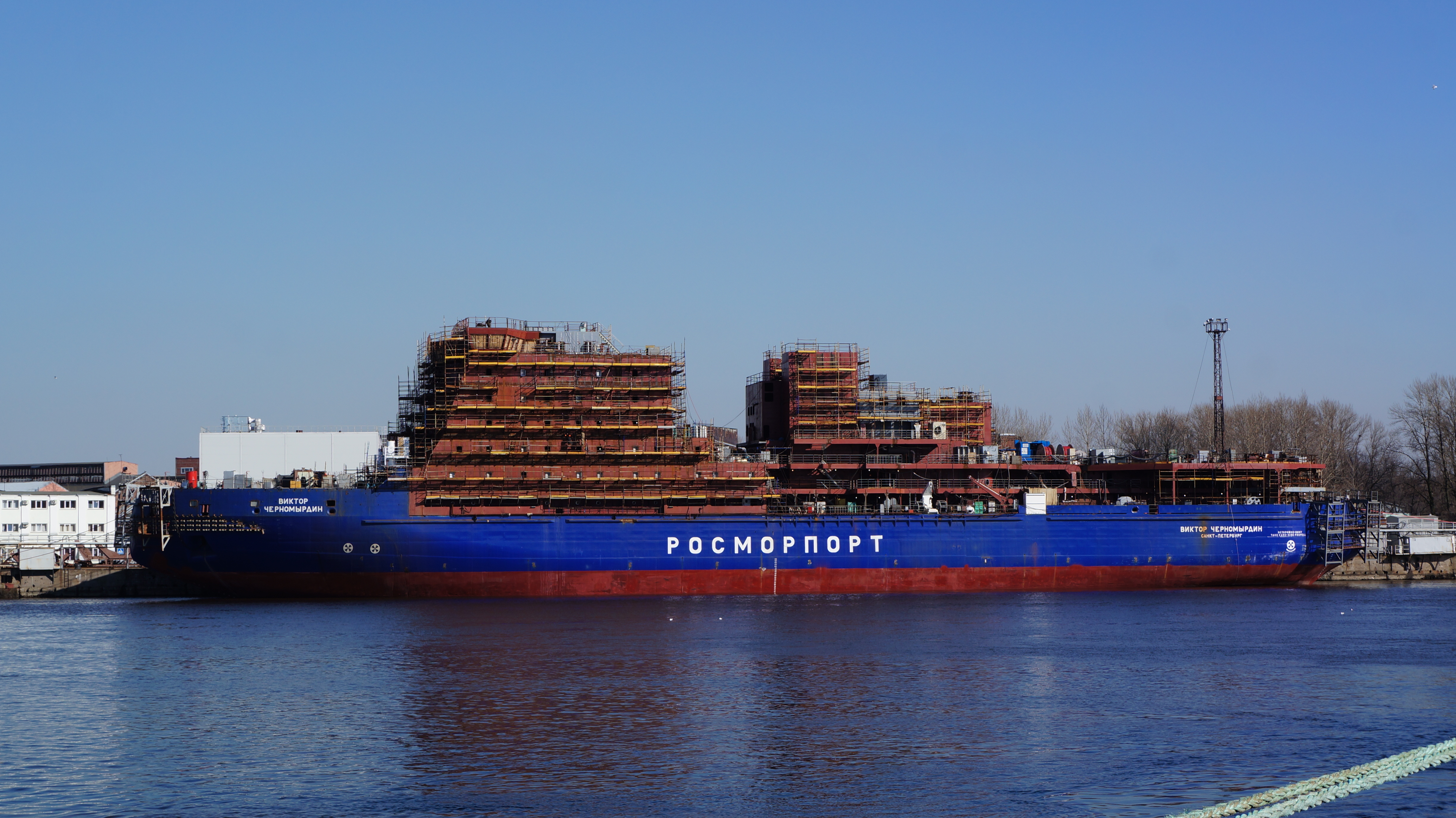
Viktor Chernomyrdin under construction in April 2018.

On 26 January 2016, it was reported that an additional RUB 1 billion of funding would be required to complete the icebreaker due to the decline of the Russian ruble following the financial crisis. In addition, the United Shipbuilding Corporation (USC) was reportedly concerned about the shipyard's ability to deliver the icebreaker in 2017 due to the international sanctions against Russia. While in April 2016 a representative of the United Shipbuilding Corporation claimed that the icebreaker would be delivered "this year" and that the value of the contract had not changed, next month a representative of Rosmorport stated that "2018 is a reality". On 16 June, the president of the United Shipbuilding Corporation, Aleksey Rakhmanov, said that the vessel would be delivered in late 2017 or early 2018, and that the cost had increased by RUB 1.5 billion. On 6 December, the vice-president of the company, Yevgeny Zagorodny, extended this to the fourth quarter of 2018.

Due to extensive delays, the Federal Agency of Sea and River Transport of Russia (Rosmorrechflot) considered a lawsuit against the United Shipbuilding Corporation and demanded a penalty of RUB 667 million through the Moscow Arbitration Court in June 2016. By September, this had increased to RUB 1.2 billion. In March 2017, the delivery of the vessel was officially postponed to the end of 2018 by an order of the federal government, meaning that the United Shipbuilding Corporation would not be required to pay penalty for the delayed delivery of the vessel. In December 2017, it was reported that another RUB 870 million would be granted to the United Shipbuilding Corporation to cover for devaluation of the Russian ruble as well as other negative effects, adding to the RUB 700 million granted in January for the same purpose. In July 2019, the estimate for the total cost of the icebreaker was about RUB 12 billion, about 50 % more than the original contract value. In late 2021, this had increased to RUB 14.6 billion.

In July 2016, it was estimated that the launching would take place in October of the same year, but the vessel was finally launched on 30 December 2016. In July 2017, it was announced that the unfinished icebreaker would be transferred to Admiralty Shipyard for outfitting in order to speed up the delivery of the vessel. According to the RUB 3.695 billion contract, the vessel must be delivered by 25 June 2019, but delivery was initially expected already in the autumn 2018. The quayside trials were completed in August 2018.

=== 2018 fire ===
On 27 November 2018, a fire broke out on board the vessel, injuring two workers and damaging about 300 square metres (3,229 sq ft) of technical spaces on the third and fourth decks containing electrical equipment and wiring. The cause of the fire was hot work adjacent to a partially-filled heavy fuel oil tank which exploded and spilled burning oil to the adjacent compartments.

At the time, USC President Aleksey Rakhmanov estimated that the accident could delay the delivery of the vessel as the fire damaged some imported equipment such as an American-sourced waste water filtration system that may be replaced by a European or South Korean unit due to the sanctions. The material damage was estimated to be over 400 million rubles (about US$6 million). A criminal case was also opened against two Admiralty Shipyard workers responsible for issuing hot work permits.

Following the fire, sea trials originally scheduled for the end of 2018 were postponed to August 2019. After further delays, Viktor Chernomyrdin finally left for sea trials to the Gulf of Finland on 5 October and returned on 22 October. Full-scale icebreaking trials, initially planned for March–April 2020, were also postponed to April 2021.

=== Disagreement over cost ===
Initially, the delivery of the vessel was scheduled for 25 December 2019. However, on 24 December it was reported that while Viktor Chernomyrdin was technically ready and manned, the delivery had been postponed to the first quarter of 2020. According to the United Shipbuilding Corporation, the new icebreaker would be handed over to Rosmorport once all legal and financial issues with the customer have been resolved. Until then, Rosmorport had refused to pay the excess cost of the vessel beyond the original contract price of about 8 billion rubles, currently estimated to be between 3 and 4 billion rubles on top of that. Since the December 2019 delivery date had not been extended by a new governmental decree, this cost overrun could have been further increased by a penalty of up to 1 billion rubles for the missed deadline.

In April 2020, it was announced that the disagreement had been settled with the Ministry of Industry and Trade and Ministry of Transport each allocating an additional 1 billion rubles for the project. In addition, the United Shipbuilding Corporation would provide an additional 1.5 billion rubles to cover the increased cost of the vessel. Following this agreement, Viktor Chernomyrdin was expected to enter service in late 2020.

The deadline for the delivery of Viktor Chernomyrdin was 1 November, but the acceptance and delivery certificate was signed already on 30 September 2020. The flag raising ceremony, attended by President Vladimir Putin, was held on 3 November 2020, the tenth anniversary of the death of Viktor Chernomyrdin after whom the icebreaker is named.

== Career ==
When the new icebreaker type size series were developed in the early 1990s, the 25-megawatt "linear sea icebreaker" (LK-25) was intended to operate primarily along the Northern Sea Route. In November 2019, the Russian newspaper Kommersant wrote that during the eight years that Viktor Chernomyrdin has been under construction, both the idea of what kind of icebreakers are needed in the Arctic as well as the organizations responsible for the infrastructure of the region have changed. The Russian state-owned corporation Rosatom, which took over the management of the Northern Sea Route in 2019, considers the capabilities of the new diesel-electric icebreaker to be insufficient compared to the nuclear-powered icebreakers it operates through its subsidiary Atomflot. However, the ship's owner Rosmorport is allowed to offer icebreaking services directly to other companies operating in the region.

In August 2020, it was announced that Viktor Chernomyrdin would be stationed in the Baltic Sea. The icebreaker left its moorings in Saint Petersburg and headed out to the Gulf of Finland to escort merchant ships to Vyborg, Vysotsk and Primorsk on 28 January 2021.

After concluding the 2021–2022 icebreaking season in the Gulf of Finland in April, Viktor Chernomyrdin began its first voyage to the Arctic to conduct ice trials in the Kara Sea. The icebreaker's capability was tested in the area between Kamennye Islands and the Russian mainland where ice was measured to be 1.5 to 2 metres (4.9 to 6.6 ft) thick with a 40 to 70 centimetres (16 to 28 in) snow cover.

Viktor Chernomyrdin was supposed take part in the Arctic Ocean Paleoceanography (ArcOP) expedition in August–September 2022 together with the Swedish icebreaker Oden and the drilling vessel Dina Polaris. Although the participation was not confirmed until June 2021, the silhouette of the Russian icebreaker was shown in the expedition logo already in February. However, in April 2022 it was announced that the ArcOP expedition would be postponed due to uncertainties regarding safety issues following Russian invasion of Ukraine in February.

In August 2022, Viktor Chernomyrdin was classified to carry up to 90 commercial passengers.

After concluding the 2023–2024 icebreaking season in the Baltic Sea, Viktor Chernomyrdin headed to the Arctic to escort ships in the Kara Sea.

== Description ==
=== General characteristics ===
Viktor Chernomyrdin is 146.8 metres (482 ft) long overall and has a maximum moulded beam of 29 metres (95 ft). She was initially designed with an operating draught range of 8.5 to 9.5 metres (28 to 31 ft) with a full load displacement of about 22,000 tonnes, but later design changes have increased the maximum draught to about 9.7 metres (32 ft). The reduced draught can be used in shallow waters such as river estuaries.

The icebreaker has a crew of 38 and additional accommodation for 90 special personnel. In addition to normal icebreaking and escorting tasks, Viktor Chernomyrdin is equipped for emergency towing and rescue operations in open water, oil spill response, offshore and underwater construction projects, and fire fighting. To support technical work, the ship can be fitted with a 150-ton deck crane. The large superstructure contains over 300 square metres (3,200 sq ft) of scientific laboratory space. A modular "diving complex" consisting of a diving chamber and other support systems built in standard-sized containers can be carried on the deck. An outboard lift allows persons with limited physical abilities as well as compact equipment to be lowered directly to the sea ice. The icebreaker has a smaller helipad in the bow for Kamov Ka-32 and Eurocopter EC225 Super Puma, and a larger helicopter deck and hangar capable of accommodating heavier Mil Mi-8 and AgustaWestland AW101 helicopters in the aft.

=== Power and propulsion ===
Viktor Chernomyrdin has a fully integrated diesel-electric propulsion system. Built according to the power plant principle, the four medium-speed diesel generating sets with an output of 8,700 kW (11,700 hp) each produce electricity for all shipboard consumers from propulsion motors to hotel functions such as lighting and air conditioning. The propulsion system consists of two 7.5-megawatt (10,100 hp) ABB Azipod VI1600 azimuthing propulsion units and one 10-megawatt (13,400 hp) propulsion motor driving a fixed shaft line at the centerline; a so-called hybrid configuration. While Viktor Chernomyrdin is not as powerful as the Russian nuclear-powered icebreakers, at 25 megawatts (33,500 hp) her propulsion power is nonetheless one of the highest among diesel-electric icebreakers. At the time of construction, she was second only to the three 26.8-megawatt (36,000 hp) Ermak-class icebreakers built in the mid-1970s. However, she is still significantly less powerful than the 44.7-megawatt (60,000 hp) gas turbine-powered USCGC Polar Star and USCGC Polar Sea operated by the United States Coast Guard.

Designed according to the double acting ship principle, Viktor Chernomyrdin is capable of moving continuously in compact ice field up to 2 metres (7 ft) thick with a 20-centimetre (8 in) snow cover at 2 knots (3.7 km/h; 2.3 mph) in both ahead and astern directions. In addition, the azimuthing propulsion units give the vessel better maneuverability than traditional icebreakers with conventional shaftlines and rudders. The vessel is also fitted with an air-bubbling system that reduces friction between the hull and ice. In open water, the icebreaker has a maximum speed of 17 knots (31 km/h; 20 mph).

Viktor Chernomyrdin is classified by the Russian Maritime Register of Shipping (RMRS). The ice class, Icebreaker8, allows the icebreaker to operate in Arctic seas with ice thickness up to 3 metres (10 ft). In addition, she has to be capable of continuous operations in compact ice field up to 2 metres (7 ft) in thickness. The icebreaker is designed to be capable of operating in temperatures as low as −35 °C (−31 °F) for 60 days.
