= Cape Sterligov =

Headland in the Kara Sea, Krasnoyarsk Krai, Russia

Cape Sterligov Мыс Стерлигова
- Cape
- Map showing the location of Cape Sterligov

- Location in Krasnoyarsk Krai, Russia
- Coordinates: 76°50′N 100°56′E
- Location: Krasnoyarsk Krai, Russia
- Offshore water bodies: Kara Sea

Area
  - Total: Russian Far North

Cape Sterligov (Russian: Мыс Стерлигова) is a headland in the Kara Sea, Krasnoyarsk Krai, Russian Federation.

== Geography ==
Cape Sterligov is located on the western shore of the Taymyr Peninsula, at the northern end of Toll Bay. Lishny Island (76°57′N 100°27′E) lies to the west-northwest of Cape Sterligov, about 16 km from its shores. The cape is in an area of tundra and the weather is extremely cold, with prolonged icy winters. The sea off the cape is covered in ice most of the year.

== Etymology ==
The cape is named after Dmitry Vasilevich Sterligov, a member of the Great Northern Expedition.

== History ==
Sterligov was podshturman under Fyodor Minin, leader of the detachment charged with documenting the coast between the Yenisey and Taymyra rivers. Sterligov set out from Turukhansk in January 1740, arriving at the cape which was to bear his name on 14 April 1740. There he built a beacon and left a note to record his journey.

In 1921 Nikifor Begichev led a Soviet expedition in search for Roald Amundsen's 1919 Arctic expedition's crew members Peter Tessem and Paul Knutsen on request of the government of Norway. Checking the remains of campfires, Begichev was able to establish that Amundsen's men had passed Cape Vilda, more than halfway down their journey, and that at that point all was well. On 2 August 1919, 90 km west of Cape Vilda, the abandoned Norwegian sledge was found by Captain Jakobsen, a Norwegian who went with Begichev, indicating that something had gone wrong with his two ill-fated compatriots. Later during the search other materials were found near Cape Sterligov.

In 1934 a meteorological station was put in operation at the cape within a network of 20 wireless stations in the Russian Arctic. On 24 or 25 September 1944 the station was attacked by an amphibious assault force from German submarine U-711 and occupied for a short while.

On 24 September 1995 a Norilsk Air Enterprise Mil Mi-2 helicopter crashed and sank through the ice while attempting to land at Cape Sterligov.

== Climate ==
Climate data for Cape Sterligov
| Month | Jan | Feb | Mar | Apr | May | Jun | Jul | Aug | Sep | Oct | Nov | Dec | Year |
|---|---|---|---|---|---|---|---|---|---|---|---|---|---|
| Record high °C (°F) | −0.1 (31.8) | −1.0 (30.2) | −0.3 (31.5) | 3.6 (38.5) | 6.8 (44.2) | 19.6 (67.3) | 27.7 (81.9) | 25.0 (77.0) | 18.0 (64.4) | 8.3 (46.9) | 0.2 (32.4) | 0.2 (32.4) | 27.7 (81.9) |
| Mean maximum °C (°F) | −9.5 (14.9) | −10.4 (13.3) | −7.0 (19.4) | −5.6 (21.9) | 0.8 (33.4) | 8.4 (47.1) | 18.0 (64.4) | 15.1 (59.2) | 8.1 (46.6) | 0.3 (32.5) | −4.8 (23.4) | −8.2 (17.2) | 19.4 (66.9) |
| Mean daily maximum °C (°F) | −23.6 (−10.5) | −24.6 (−12.3) | −22.1 (−7.8) | −15.7 (3.7) | −6.3 (20.7) | 1.5 (34.7) | 6.5 (43.7) | 6.0 (42.8) | 1.5 (34.7) | −7.8 (18.0) | −17.2 (1.0) | −22.5 (−8.5) | −10.4 (13.4) |
| Daily mean °C (°F) | −27.3 (−17.1) | −28.2 (−18.8) | −26.1 (−15.0) | −19.9 (−3.8) | −9.3 (15.3) | −0.3 (31.5) | 3.7 (38.7) | 3.6 (38.5) | −0.4 (31.3) | −10.8 (12.6) | −20.8 (−5.4) | −26.0 (−14.8) | −13.5 (7.7) |
| Mean daily minimum °C (°F) | −31.0 (−23.8) | −31.8 (−25.2) | −30.0 (−22.0) | −24.0 (−11.2) | −12.3 (9.9) | −2.1 (28.2) | 0.8 (33.4) | 1.2 (34.2) | −2.2 (28.0) | −13.7 (7.3) | −24.4 (−11.9) | −29.5 (−21.1) | −16.6 (2.2) |
| Mean minimum °C (°F) | −41.7 (−43.1) | −41.5 (−42.7) | −41.8 (−43.2) | −34.7 (−30.5) | −23.2 (−9.8) | −8.6 (16.5) | −2.4 (27.7) | −2.6 (27.3) | −9.4 (15.1) | −26.2 (−15.2) | −34.3 (−29.7) | −39.8 (−39.6) | −44.7 (−48.5) |
| Record low °C (°F) | −49.6 (−57.3) | −48.2 (−54.8) | −48.9 (−56.0) | −45.7 (−50.3) | −32.2 (−26.0) | −22.2 (−8.0) | −5.4 (22.3) | −13 (9) | −23.4 (−10.1) | −39 (−38) | −42.9 (−45.2) | −49.3 (−56.7) | −49.6 (−57.3) |
| Average precipitation mm (inches) | 30.8 (1.21) | 18.1 (0.71) | 15.8 (0.62) | 13.7 (0.54) | 10.2 (0.40) | 15.9 (0.63) | 19.4 (0.76) | 24.2 (0.95) | 20.7 (0.81) | 20.0 (0.79) | 14.0 (0.55) | 18.3 (0.72) | 221.1 (8.69) |
| Average precipitation days (≥ 1 mm) | 6.5 | 4.8 | 5.2 | 4.3 | 3.2 | 4.3 | 5.2 | 6.3 | 7.0 | 6.4 | 4.6 | 5.5 | 63.3 |
Source 1: Météo climat stats
Source 2: Météo Climat
