= Shrenk =

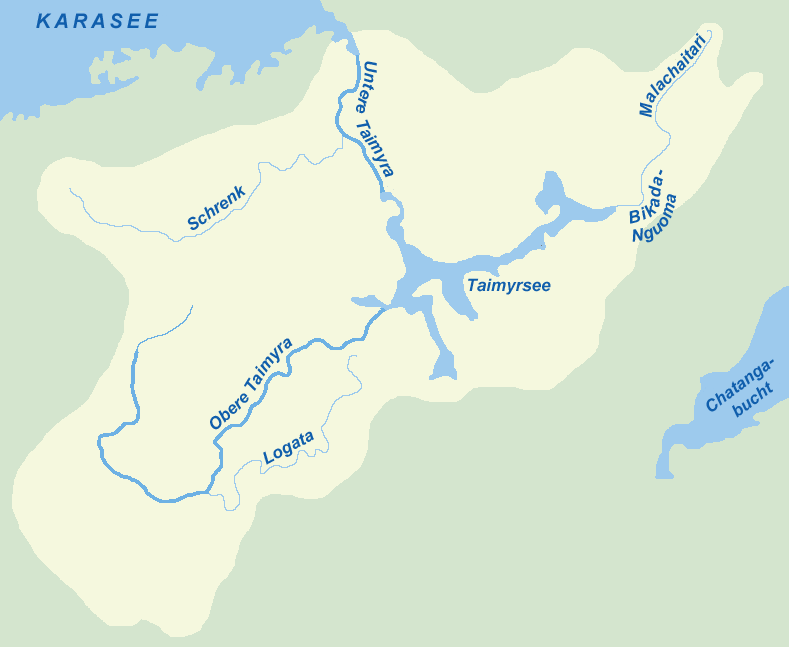
- Basin of the Taymyra.
- Native name: Шренк (Russian)

Location
- Country: Krasnoyarsk Krai, Russia

Physical characteristics
- Source
  - location: Byrranga Mountains.
  - elevation: 270 m (890 ft)
- Mouth: Lower Taymyra
  - coordinates: 75°30′58″N 99°13′46″E
  - elevation: 0.6 m (2 ft 0 in)
- Length: 372 km (231 mi)(total)
- Basin size: 11,800 km^{2} (4,600 sq mi)
- Discharge
  - average: 1,220 m^{3}/s (43,000 cu ft/s)

Basin features
- Progression: Taymyra→ Kara Sea

The Shrenk (Russian: Шренк) is a river in Russia, the main left tributary of the Taymyra. It is located in the western side of the Taymyr Peninsula in the Krasnoyarsk Krai administrative region of the Russian Federation.

== Course ==
The Shrenk flows into the Lower Taymyra after the latter flows out of Lake Taymyr northwards across the Byrranga mountain region into the Taymyr Gulf of the Kara Sea. It is 372 kilometres (231 mi) long, and has a drainage basin of 11,800 square kilometres (4,600 sq mi). The Shrenk's main left hand tributary is the 168 km long Mamonta ('Mammoth River'), where the remains of the northernmost Mammoth in the world were found in 1948. Its right hand tributaries are the 74 km long Moskvichka, the 84 km long Posadochnaya, the 94 km long Gryadovaya and the 93 km long Graviynaya.

The area of the Shrenk basin is a largely uninhabited and desolate expanse without modern infrastructures. It was explored by Russian biologist and explorer Alexander von Middendorff in 1843.
