= Rastorguyev Island =

Russian: остров Расторгуева
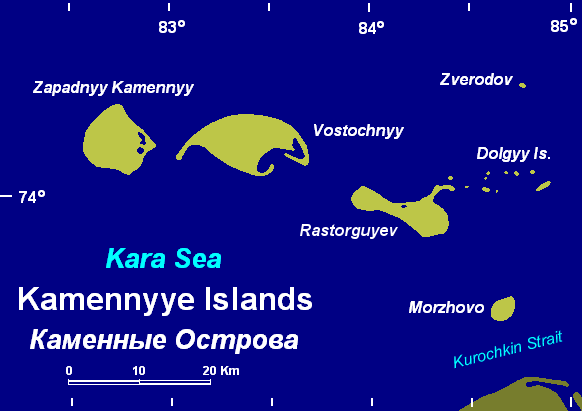

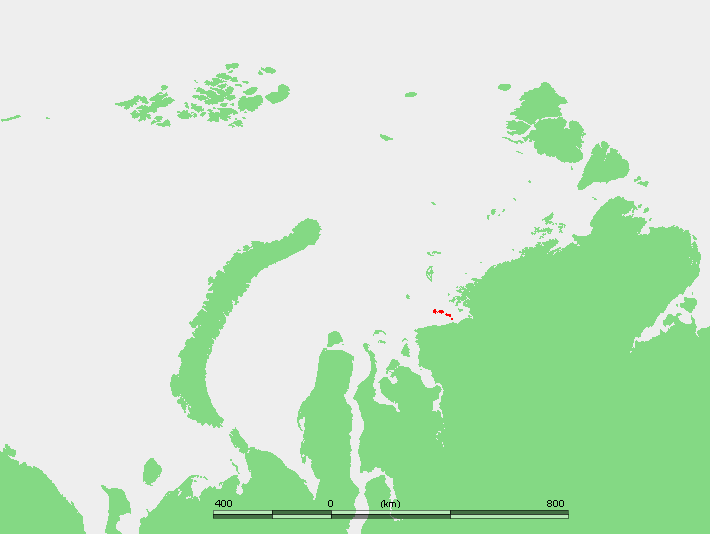
- Location of the island group in the Kara Sea

Geography
- Location: Kara Sea
- Coordinates: 73°57′N 84°09′E
- Archipelago: Kamennyye Islands
- Highest elevation: 115 m (377 ft)
- Highest point: Mount Kolomeitsev

Administration
- Russia

Demographics
- Population: 0

Rastorguyev Island or Rastorguyeva Island (Russian: остров Расторгуева, ostrov Rastorguyeva) is an island in the Kara Sea, Russian Federation.

== Geography ==
It is the third largest island of the Kamennyye Islands. It is located close to the shores of the Taymyr Peninsula, about 30 km (19 mi) from the coast. A narrow and bent landspit projects northwards of the northern shore. There are two hills on the island, the highest of which is Mount Kolomeitsev (Gora Kolomeitseva) —named after Nikolai Kolomeitsev— in the eastern part.

Winters are long, cold and bitter, and the surrounding sea freezes solid about ten months every year.

== History ==
The whole area around Rastorguyev Island was explored by Russian geologist Baron Eduard von Toll during his last venture, the Russian Arctic Expedition of 1900–1903. This large island was named by him after Stepan Innokentyevich Rastorguyev, an Imperial Russian Cossack officer accompanying him.

Toll sent Rastorguyev along with the former captain of ship Zarya, N. N. Kolomeitsev, on a long sledge trip with the mission of organizing coal depots for the Zarya on Kotelny Island and at Dikson, as well as to bring the mail of the expedition to Dudinka. This mission helped to bring relief to Baron Toll in a difficult situation concerning his relationship with Captain Kolomeitsev. Rastorguyev was always ready to help Baron Eduard von Toll during his explorations in the Siberian coast and Toll never hid the fact that he was grateful for his services.

In 1937 another island, Kolchak Island, located in the Taymyr Gulf further east along the Taymyr Peninsula's coast, was renamed after Stepan Rastorguyev. Thus, for a few decades, there were two "Rastorguyeva" islands in the Kara Sea itself. However, the other island's previous name was restored on 23 August 2005, so that now there is less confusion.

== See also ==
- List of islands of Russia
