= Stepan Rastorguyev =

Yakut Cossack Regiment officer and explorer

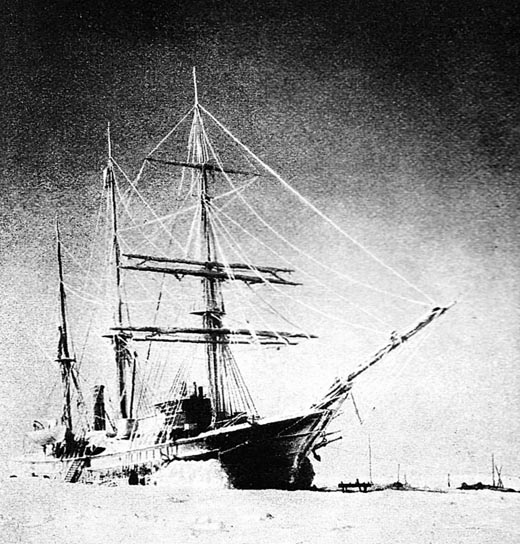
Russian Polar ship Zarya.

Stepan Innokentyevich Rastorguyev (Russian: Степа́н Инноке́нтьевич Расторгу́ев; 1864 in Yakutsk – after 1904) was an officer of the Yakut Cossack Regiment and an explorer.

As Rastorguyev's parents died early, he was reared by his kindred. Then he was sent to the Okhotsk Sea coast, Kamchatka and Chukotka. In 1888 Rastorguyev was tasked to open the straight road from Yakutsk to Verkhoyansk and met his engagements.

In 1900 Rastorguyev joined Baron Eduard Toll's Russian Polar Expedition on ship Zarya. In 1901, during the first wintering, Toll sent Rastorguyev along with hitherto captain of Zarya N. N. Kolomeitsev on a long sledge trip. Their mission was to organize coal depots for the Zarya on Kotelny Island and at Dikson, as well as to bring the mail of the expedition to Dudinka. Kolomeitsev and Rastorguev were successful in their trip. They covered the 600 km long distance from Bukhta Kolin Archera, SW of Taymyr Island, to Dikson in one month. This mission helped to bring relief to Baron Toll in a stressful situation concerning his relationship with Captain Kolomeitsev during the expedition, and Toll was grateful to Rastorguyev.

For his deserts to Baron Eduard Toll Rastorguyev's name was given to a certain island, as well as to a strait and a mountain. By the express petition of Baron Eduard Toll Rastorguyev was awarded the golden medal "For Eagerness" with the ribbon of Order of St. Anne and honorary kaftan.

In 1937 another island, Kolchak Island in the Kamennye group, was renamed after Rastorguyev as well, but its previous name has been restored on August 23d, 2005, so that now only one Rastorguyev Island remains.

== See also ==
- Nikolai Nikolaevich Kolomeitsev
