= Salvelinus taimyricus =

Scientific classification
- Kingdom: Animalia
- Phylum: Chordata
- Class: Actinopterygii
- Order: Salmoniformes
- Family: Salmonidae
- Genus: Salvelinus
- Species: S. taimyricus

Binomial name
- Salvelinus taimyricus Mikhin, 1949

Species of fish

Salvelinus taimyricus, commonly known as the taimy char, is a species of freshwater fish in the salmon family. It is found in the Lake Taymyr at the Taymyr Peninsula in Arctic Russia.

== Description ==
The species is purely lacustrine and do not go to the rivers. The fish can reach a recorded maximum length of 49 cm (19.2 inches) and a weight of 1300 g, with an age of 13 years.

The head of the fish is high, while the snout is blunt and the mouth is large. The lower jaw extends beyond the vertical of the posterior edge of the eye. The lips are gray or orange, the back is gray-green, the sides are silvery-gray, and the belly is white. The paired and anal fins are red or gray. There are no or few round light orange spots on the sides. During spawning, the body and fins are brick-red.
