= Rastorguyev (surname) =

Rastorguyev or Rastorguev (Russian: Расторгуев) is a Russian masculine surname, its feminine counterpart is Rastorguyeva or Rastorgueva. It may refer to

- Nikolay Rastorguyev (born 1957), Russian singer
- Simon Rastorguev (born 1981), Russian architect
- Stepan Rastorguyev (1864–after 1904), Russian explorer
