= Firnley Islands =

Group of three small islands in the Kara Sea

Native name: острова Фирнлея
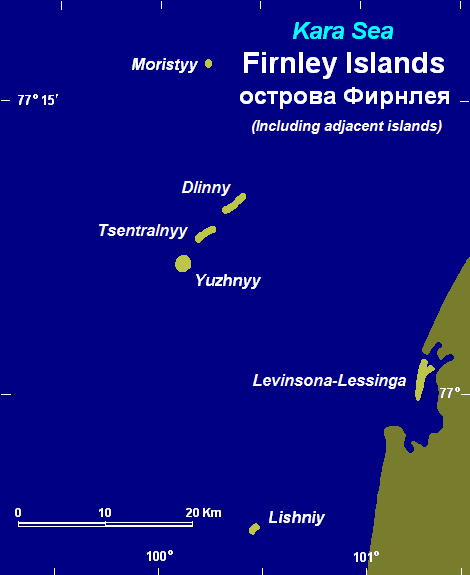
- Map of the group showing adjacent islands

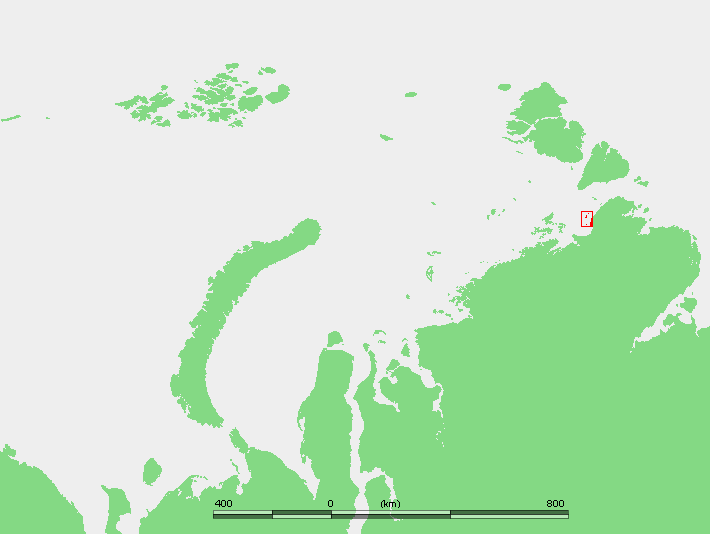
- Location of the Firnley Islands in the Kara Sea

Geography
- Location: Kara Sea
- Coordinates: 77°04′N 100°19′E
- Archipelago: Firnley Archipelago
- Total islands: 3
- Major islands: Dlinnyy

Administration
- Russia
- Krai: Krasnoyarsk Krai

Demographics
- Population: uninhabited

The Firnley Islands (Russian: острова Фирнлея; Ostrova Firnleya, Nynorsk: Firnleyøyane) is a group of three small islands covered with tundra vegetation and with scattered stones on their shores. They lie in the Kara Sea, close to the bleak coast of Siberia's Taymyr Peninsula, not far east of the Nordenskjold Archipelago. These islands lie about 35 km from the continental shore.

The Firnley Islands were named by Fridtjof Nansen. He named the island group after Thomas Fearnley, a Norwegian merchant who was one of the main financiers of the Fram expedition. They were also explored later by the Arctic Ocean Hydrographic Expedition.

== Geography ==
The Firnley Islands are covering the entrance to the Vilkitsky Strait from the west. They are all relatively small islands, Dlinnyy, the largest of the group, is only about 5 km in length.

The sea surrounding the islands is covered with fast ice in the winter, which is long and bitter, and the climate is exceptionally severe. The surrounding sea is obstructed by pack ice even in the summer, so that these islands are connected with the mainland for most of the year.

This island group belongs to the Krasnoyarsk Krai administrative division of the Russian Federation. It is also part of the Great Arctic State Nature Reserve, the largest nature reserve of Russia.

The Firnley Islands were named by Fridtjof Nansen after Thomas Fearnley^{?}, a Norwegian merchant who was one of the main financiers of the Fram expedition.

=== Adjacent islands ===
Although located relatively close by, the following islands are usually not considered part of the Firnley group:

- Moristy Island 77°19′N 100°18′E is a round isolated island located 20 km north of the Firnley group. Moristy is 600 m across.
- Lishny Island 76°57′N 100°27′E lies 35 km further SSE of Yuzhnyy Firnleya, north of Toll Bay and 16 km from Cape Sterligov on the coast. Lishniy is 1.3 km long and 650 m wide and is location of a missing nuclear generator.
- Levinson-Lessing Island (Ostrov Levinsona-Lessinga) 77°01′N 101°17′E is located close to the shore, 23 km to the NE of Lishniy. This 7 km long island was named after prominent Russian geologist Feodor Yulievich Levinson-Lessing.

== See also ==
- Kara Sea
