= Cape Oscar =

Headland on the Taymyr Peninsula in the Kara Sea, Russia

Cape Oscar Мыс Оскара
- Cape
- Map showing the location of Cape Oscar

- Coordinates: 76°29′47″N 98°55′59″E
- Location: Krasnoyarsk Krai, Russia
- Offshore water bodies: Kara Sea

Area
  - Total: Russian Far North

Cape Oscar (Russian: Мыс Оскара; Mys Oskara) is a headland on the western shore of the Taymyr Peninsula in the Kara Sea, Russian Federation. This cape is located at the northern tip of the Oscar Peninsula, between the Taymyr Gulf and Toll Bay.

Administratively Cape Oscar is part of the Taymyrsky Dolgano-Nenetsky District of Krasnoyarsk Krai.
