= Aruküla, Järva County =

Village in Estonia

Aruküla
- Village
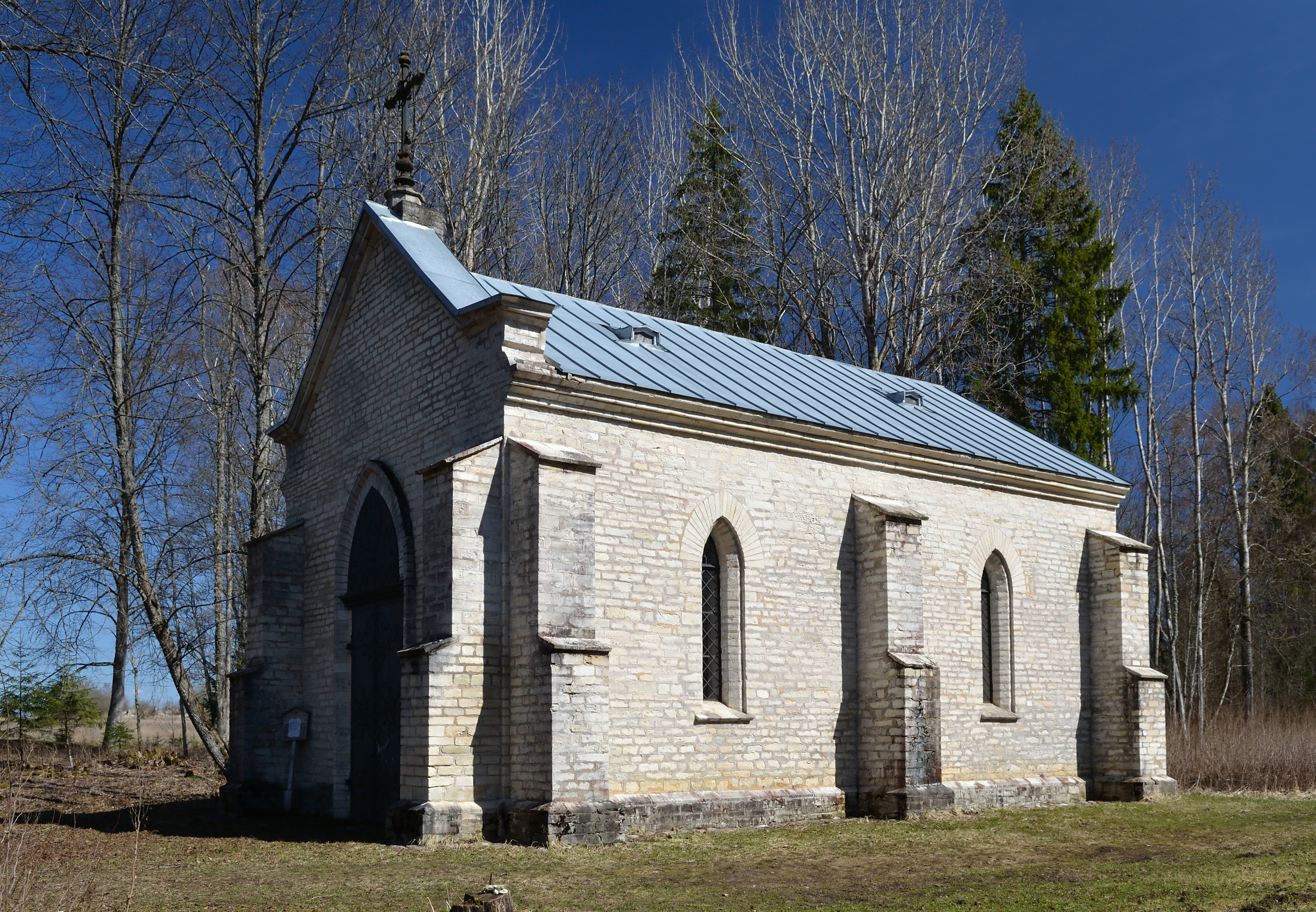
- The von Toll family burial chapel at Aruküla manor

- Location in Estonia
- Coordinates: 58°57′19″N 26°00′19″E
- Country: Estonia
- County: Järva County
- Parish: Järva Parish
- Time zone: UTC+2 (EET)
  - Summer (DST): UTC+3 (EEST)

Aruküla is a village in Järva Parish, Järva County in northern-central Estonia.

== Aruküla Manor ==
Aruküla manor (German: Arroküll) evolved into an independent estate in the 17th century.

Russian general Karl Wilhelm von Toll, mentioned by Tolstoy in his epic "War and Peace", lived on Aruküla manor and is buried in a chapel on the grounds. Other historical manor buildings lie in neighbouring Koeru settlement.
