= Mikhail Brusnev =

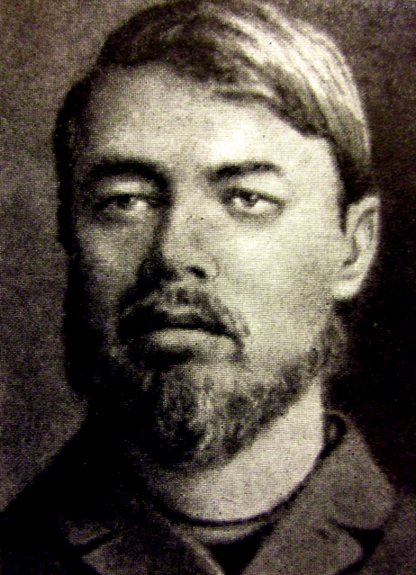
Mikhail Ivanovich Brusnev

Mikhail Ivanovich Brusnev (Russian: Михаил Иванович Бруснев) (1864–1937) was a Russian revolutionary, Marxist, explorer and an early leader of the Russian Social Democratic movement from which the Bolshevik organisation and the Communist Party of the Soviet Union originated.

== Biography ==
Mikhail Brusnev was born 13 (25) January 1864, in Storozhevaia, a stanitsa (cossack village) in the Kuban'. His father was a Kuban Cossack and a Cornet in the Russian army. After a secondary school education in Stravropol, in 1885, he began a six-year course at the St. Petersburg Technological Institute. In 1889, he brought together students from St Petersburg University and several technological institutes to form one of Russia's first active Marxist groups. He organised the distribution of illegal literature. In 1891, he was one of the organisers of Russia's first May Day demonstrations.

In 1891, Brusnev was employed on the Moscow-Brest railway, which enabled to act as a link between Social Democrat groups in Tula, Nizhny Novgorod, Kharkov, and Kiev. He circulated literature from Georgi Plekhanov's group, Emancipation of Labour. Arrested in April 1892, he was sentenced to six years in prison, followed by ten years exile in Siberia.

In 1901, during his exile in Yakutia, he joined a Russian arctic expedition. In 1903, alongside Aleksandr Kolchak, he led a search for the lost expedition of Eduard Toll, bringing back Toll's diary. He also found the remains of a mammoth in the island of New Siberia during his unfruitful search for Eduard Toll. He returned to St. Petersburg in 1904. Then he joined the Engineers' Union. In 1907, Brusnev was elected to the State Duma representing the left bloc of Bolsheviks and Socialist Revolutionaries. Later, he gave up political activity.

After 1922, Brusnev worked for the USSR People's Commissariat for Trade, in Latvia, Lithuania, and later France.

He died in 1937 in Leningrad.
