= Karl Wilhelm von Toll =

Russian military leader (1777–1842)

Count Karl Wilhelm von Toll
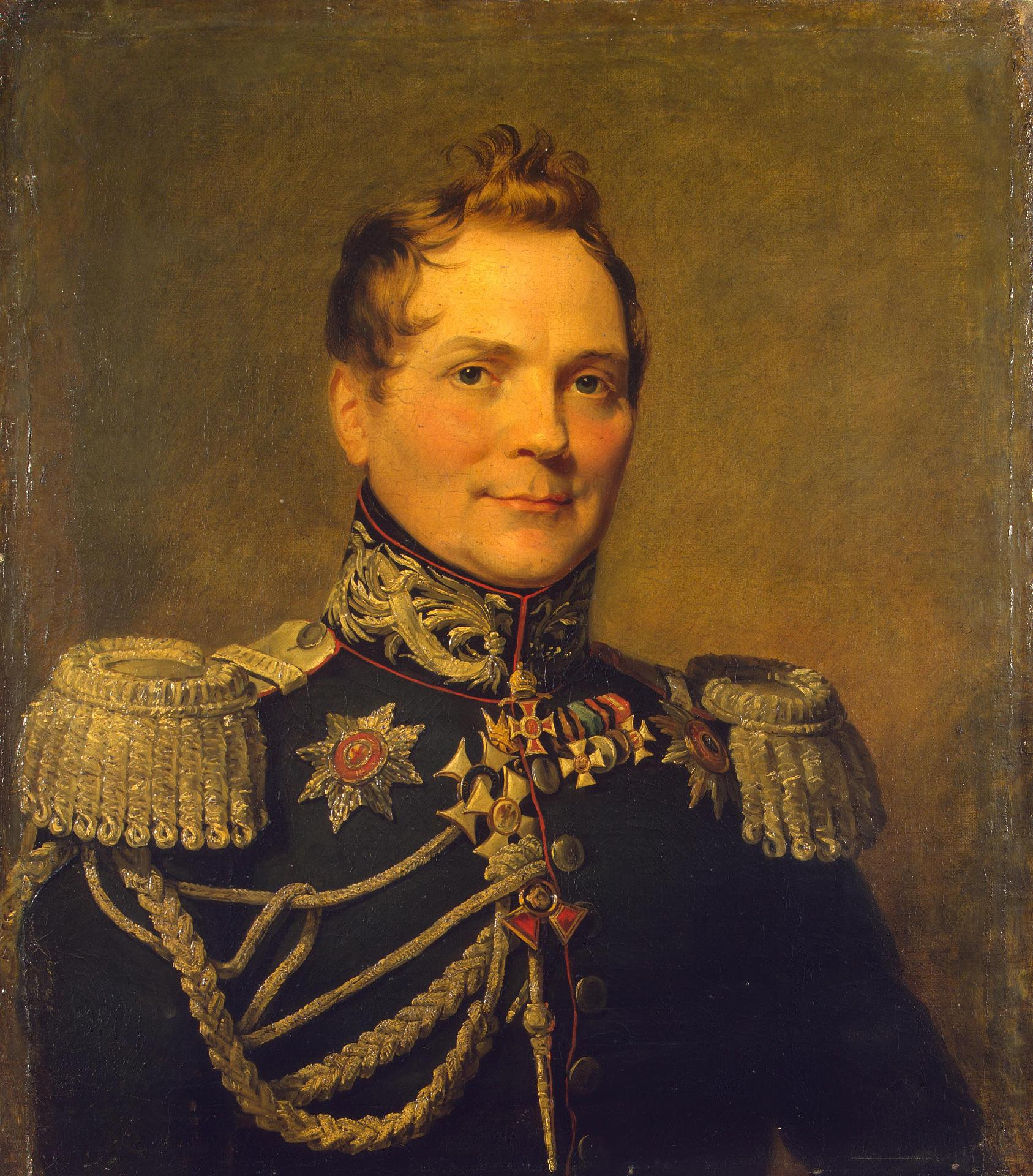
- Portrait by George Dawe (c. 1819–1823)
- Born: 19 April [O.S. 8] 1777; Keskvere Manor (Keskfer), Keskvere, Wiek County, Governorate of Estonia, Russian Empire
- Died: 5 May [O.S. 23 April] 1842 (aged 65); Saint Petersburg, Russian Empire
- Other name: Karl Fedorovich Toll
- Military career
- Allegiance: Russia
- Branch: Infantry, Staff
- Service years: 1796–1833
- Rank: General of Infantry
- Conflicts: War of the Second Coalition; Suvorov's Swiss campaign; War of the Third Coalition; Battle of Austerlitz; French invasion of Russia; Battle of Borodino; Battle of Krasnoi; War of the Sixth Coalition; Battle of Leipzig; Battle of Paris; Russo-Turkish War (1828–1829); Battle of Kulevicha; November Uprising; Battle of Warsaw
- Awards: Count, 1829

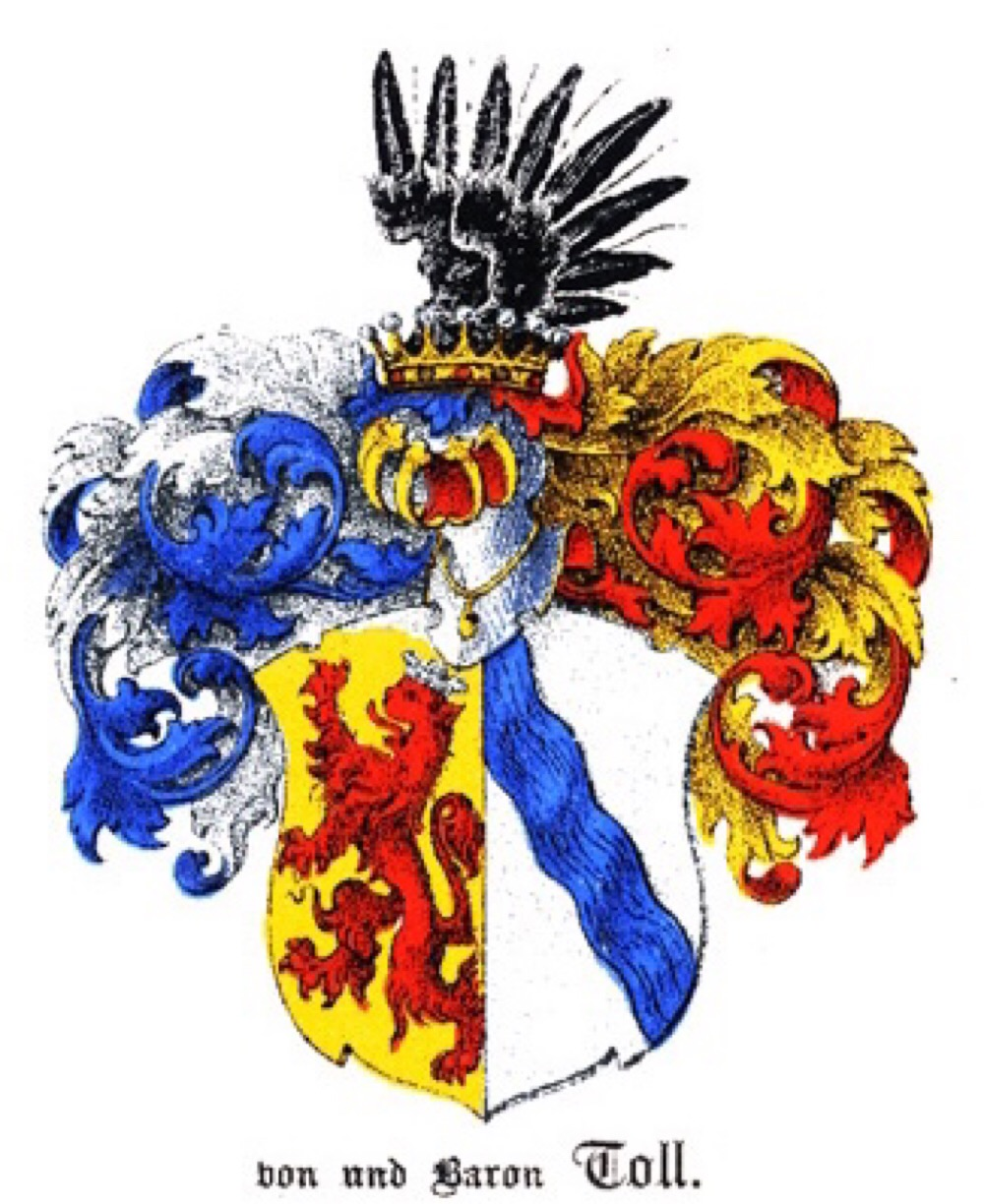
Coat of arms of the baronial Toll family, in the Baltic coat of arms book by Carl Arvid Klingspor in 1882

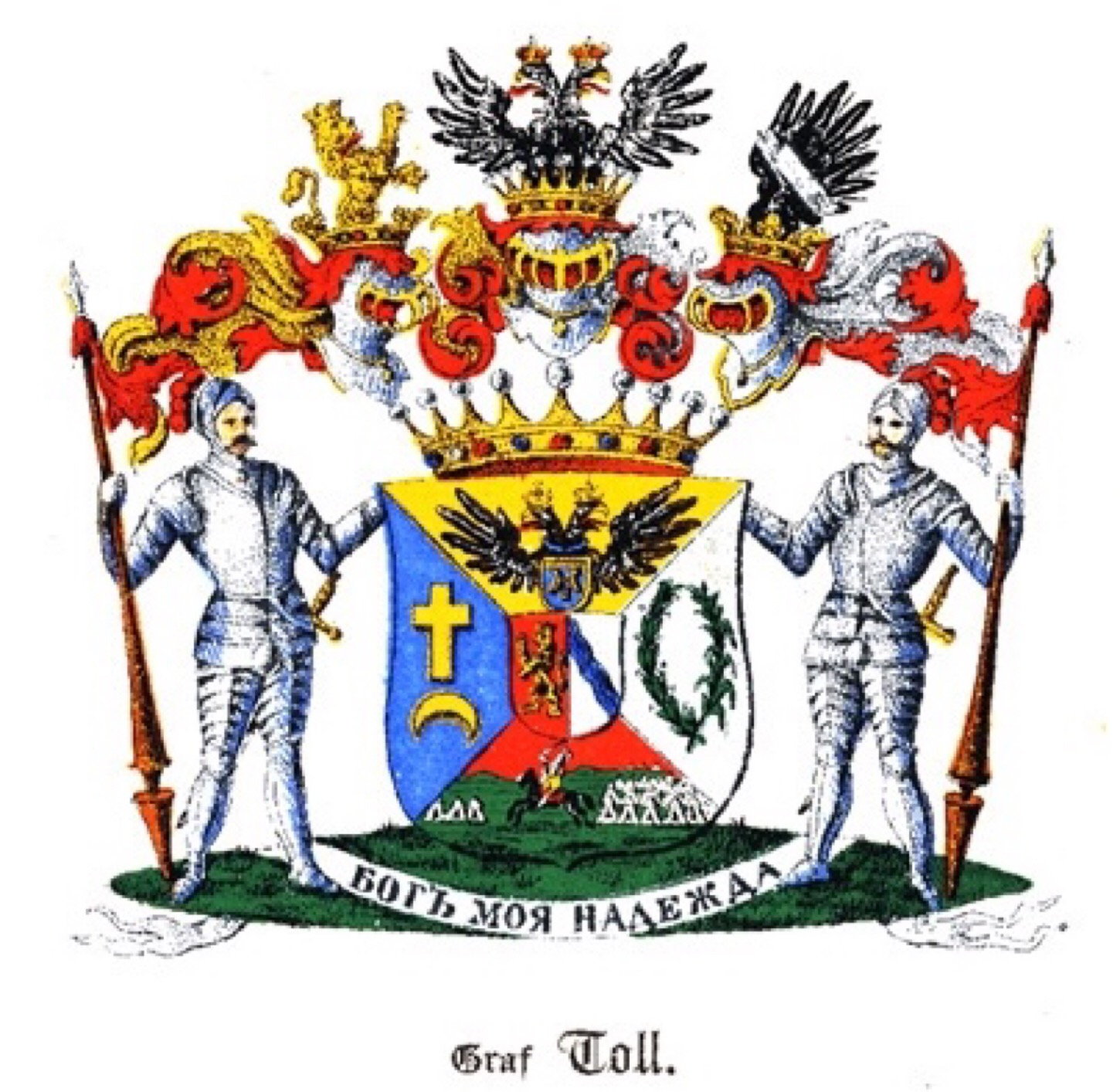
Coat of arms of the Russian comital Toll family of 1829, in the Baltic coat of arms book by Carl Arvid Klingspor in 1882

Count Karl Wilhelm von Toll (Russian: Карл Фёдорович Толь, romanized: Karl Fyodorovich Tol' ; 9 April 1777 – 5 May 1842) was a Baltic German aristocrat and Russian subject who served in the Imperial Russian Army in the campaigns against the Napoleonic Army.

== Origins ==
Karl Wilhelm von Toll was the son of Conrad Friedrich von Toll (27 March 1749 – 3 February 1821) and Justine Wilhelmine Ruckteschell (born 18 January 1752). His family was of Dutch origins, but had settled in Sweden in the 15th century. One of his forebears had served as an emissary for Sweden to Ivan the Terrible, and had been rewarded for this service with lands in Estonia.

== Career ==
Toll began his military career in 1796 after a period in the infantry cadet corps under the command of Mikhail Kutuzov. He first saw action in the Swiss expedition of Alexander Suvarov in 1799 and took part in the war of the War of the Third Coalition in 1805. He fought at Austerlitz, in the Turkish campaigns from 1806 to 1809, and in the War of the Sixth Coalition, notably at Leipzig. In 1812 he was named Quartermaster General of the First Army and commanded the evacuation of Moscow. He subsequently led troops at Brienne and Fère-Champenoise, and entered Paris in 1815.

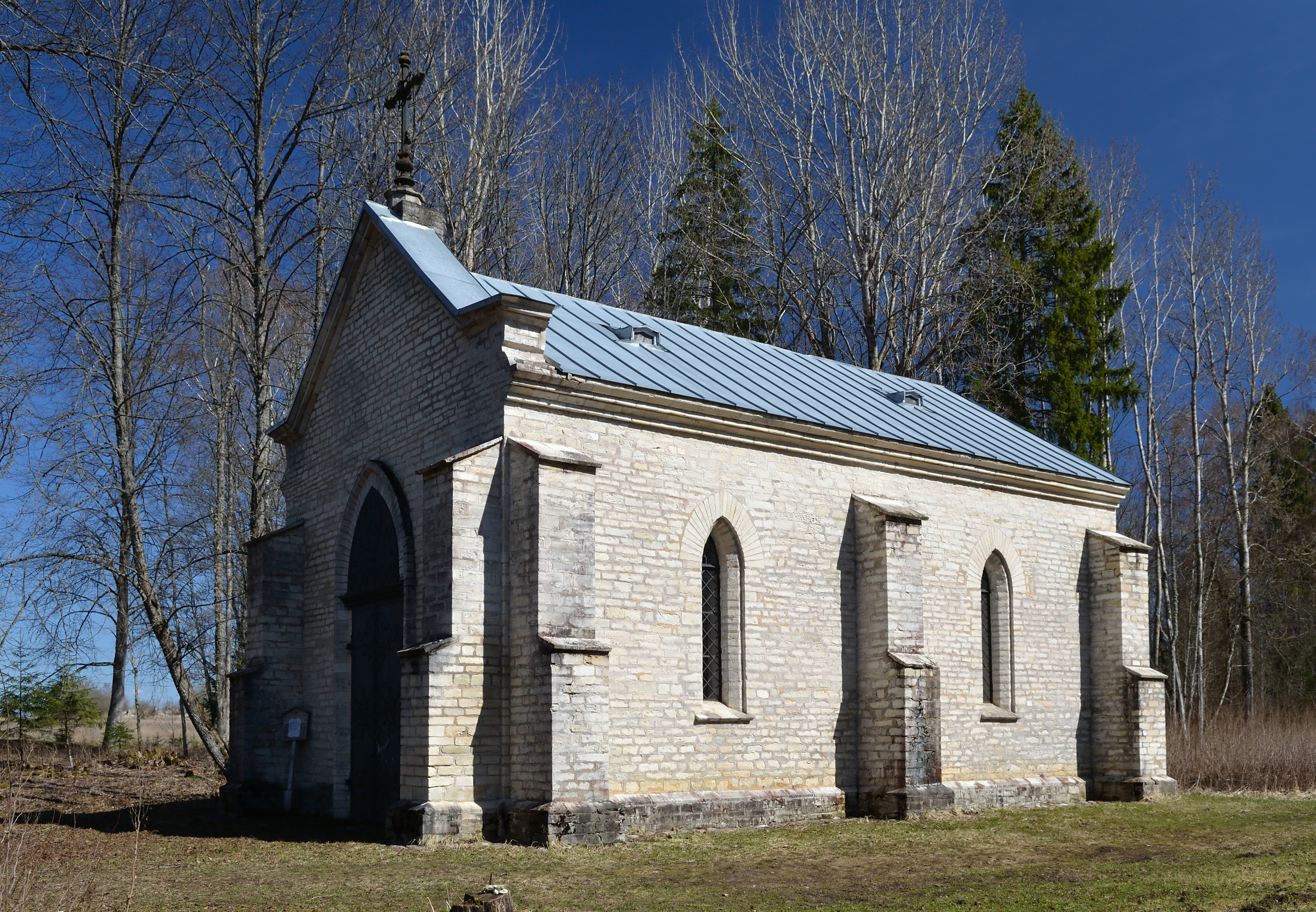
The von Toll family burial chapel at Aruküla manor (Estonia)

He was named general-adjutant to the emperor in 1823, and infantry general in 1825. In the 1829 campaign against the Turks, General von Toll was chief of the general staff. For his role in the victory at Kulevicha he was granted the title of count by Tsar Nicholas I. During the Polish campaign of 1831, he served as chief of the general staff of Hans Karl von Diebitsch, and succeeded von Diebitsch upon his death. He took part in the siege of Warsaw by Paskevich in September 1831 and succeeded wounded Paskevich as a commander in chief during the final stages of the assault of the city. In 1833 he served on the state council as minister of transport, in which capacity he paid special attention to the Institute of Transport Engineers. He subsequently retired to his estate in the Governorate of Estonia.

Count von Toll was the landowner of Aruküla Manor (German: Arroküll) in present-day Estonia, which he rebuilt in a neoclassical style. He is buried in the family chapel on the grounds of the estate. The chapel was restored in 1996.

== Sources ==
- "Толь, Карл Федорович" . Brockhaus and Efron Encyclopedic Dictionary (in Russian). 1906.
- Bernhardi: Denkwürdigkeiten aus dem Leben des Grafen von Toll, 2. Auflage, Leipzig 1866, 4 Bände
- Jaromir Hirtenfeld: Der Militär-Maria-Theresien-Orden und seine Mitglieder, Wien 1857, S.1284
