= Taymyr (icebreaker) =

Two icebreakers and one class of icebreaker, have been named Taymyr, after the Taymyr Peninsula:

- Taymyr (1909 icebreaker), a steam-powered icebreaker
- Taymyr-class icebreaker
  - Taymyr (1987 icebreaker), a nuclear-powered shallow draft icebreaker

== See also ==
- Taymyr (disambiguation)
