= Toll Bay =

Bay in the Kara Sea, Russia

- Залив Толля (Russian)
- Map showing the location of Залив Толля in Krasnoyarsk Krai.

- Location in Krasnoyarsk Krai
- Location: Far North
- Coordinates: 76°34′N 99°36′E
- River sources: Leningradskaya River
- Ocean/sea sources: Kara Sea
- Basin countries: Russia

Toll Bay, (Russian: Залив Толля) is a bay in the Kara Sea, Russia. Administratively, Toll Bay and its adjacent area belong to the Krasnoyarsk Krai administrative division of the Russian Federation.

== Geography ==
Toll Bay is located in the western shores of the Taymyr Peninsula, northeast of the Taymyr Gulf and it is open towards the west. It is limited by Cape Oscar, the headland of the Oscar Peninsula, on its southwestern side and by Cape Sterligov on its northeastern side. Lishny Island (76°57′N 100°27′E) lies north of Toll Bay about 16 km from the coast.

Toll Bay is surrounded by bleak tundra coast. The climate in the area is severe, with long and bitter winters and frequent blizzards and gales. This desolate bay is frozen for about nine months in a year and even in summer it is never quite free of ice floes.

== History ==
This bay was explored by Russian geologist Baron Eduard von Toll during his last venture, the Russian Arctic Expedition of 1900-1903 and was later named after him, by Fridtjof Nansen

The whole area is part of the Great Arctic State Nature Reserve, the largest nature reserve of Russia.
