= Kukruse =

Village in Estonia

- Village
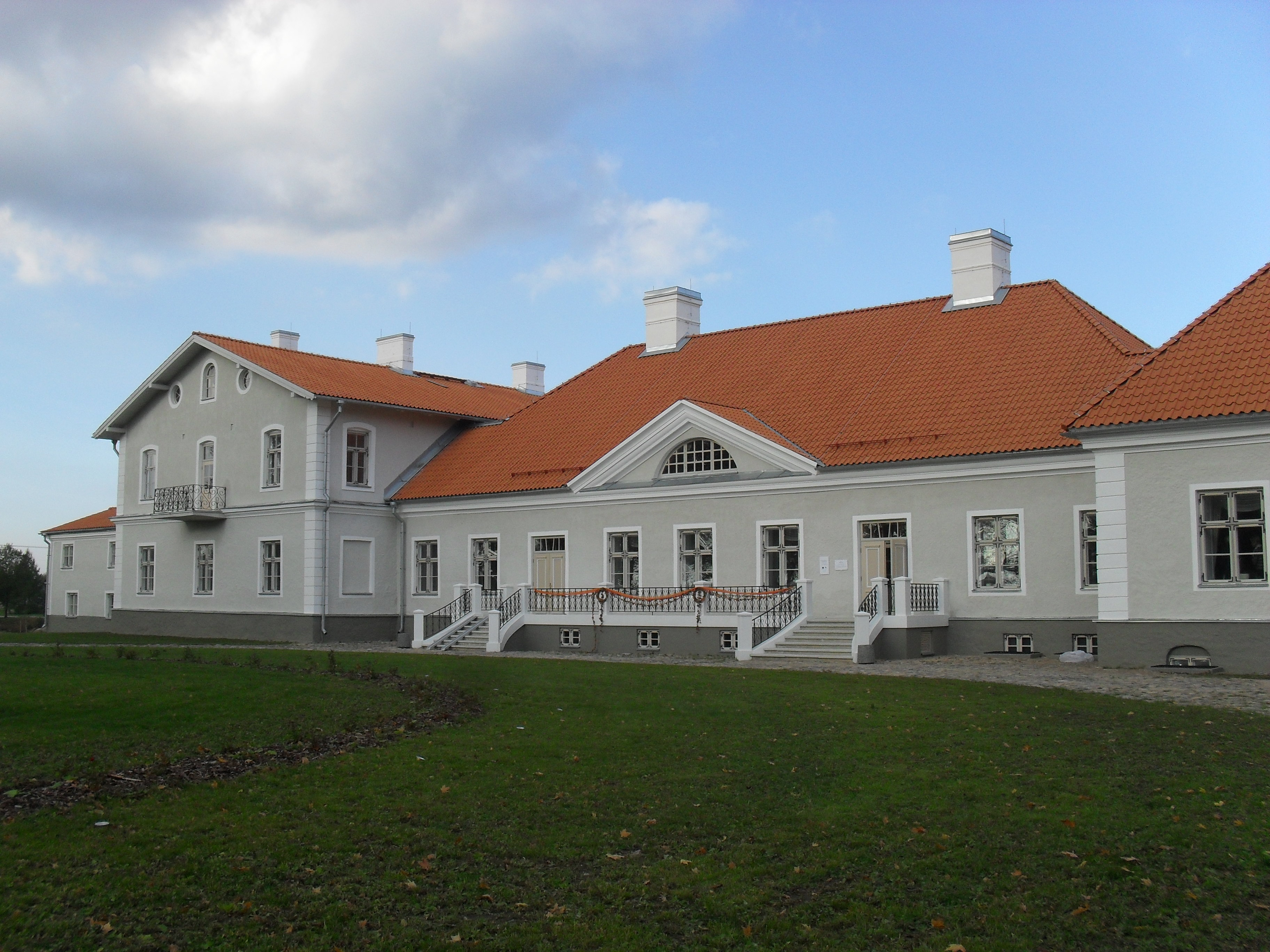
- Main building of Kukruse manor

- Location in Estonia
- Coordinates: 59°23′09″N 27°21′36″E
- Country: Estonia
- County: Ida-Viru County
- Municipality: Toila Parish

Population (2011 Census)
  - Total: 52

Kukruse (German: Kuckers) is a village in Toila Parish, Ida-Viru County in northeastern Estonia. It is located by the Tallinn–Narva road (E20), between the cities of Kohtla-Järve and Jõhvi. Adjacent to the village is a district of Kohtla-Järve sharing the same name, Kukruse.

Before the 2017 Administrative Reform, the village belonged to Kohtla Parish.

As of the 2011 census, the settlement's population was 52.

Kukersite, a marine type oil shale of Ordovician age, is named after Kukruse.

During the road construction in 2009, a cemetery approximately 800 years old was revealed. Fifty graves were studied. The human remains and objects placed in the graves provide a good picture of 13th-century society, culture, and beliefs. Some of the finds from Kukruse were displayed at the Estonian History Museum.

== Kukruse Manor ==
Kukruse knight manor was first mentioned in 1453. The present building received its appearance in the 19th century when a second floor was added to the left wing of the originally baroque house.

Several prominent members of the Baltic German family von Toll have lived at Kukruse, namely genealogist Friedrich Ludwig von Toll (1781–1841), historian Robert von Toll (1802–1876) and geologist and Arctic explorer Eduard von Toll (1858–1902).

The manor housed a museum named the Kukruse Polar Manor (Kukruse polaarmõis), which was dedicated to Eduard von Toll and Sannikov Land. The museum was closed after operating at a loss, and the manor was put up for sale in 2025.
