= Kamennye Islands =

Group of islands in the Kara Sea, Russian Federation

Russian: Каменные Острова
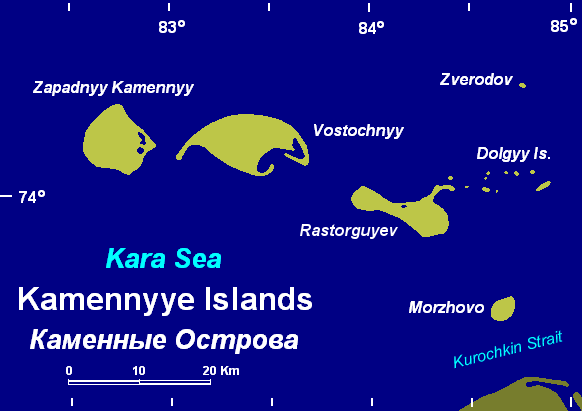

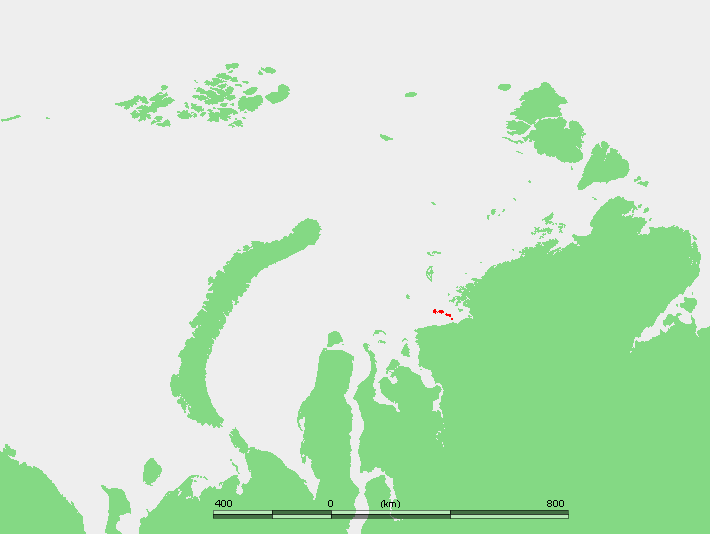
- Location of the island group in the Kara Sea

Geography
- Location: Kara Sea
- Coordinates: 74°07′N 82°48′E
- Total islands: 6
- Major islands: Vostochny, Zapadny Kamenny, Rastorguyev

Administration
- Russia

Demographics
- Population: 0

The Kamennye Islands or Kammenny Islands (Russian: Каменные Острова; Kamennye Ostrova) are a group of islands in the Kara Sea, Russian Federation.

== Geography ==
The islands lie off the coast of Siberia, west of the mouths of river Pyasina. They are covered with tundra vegetation.

The sea surrounding the Kamennye Islands is covered with pack ice with some polynias in the winter and there are many ice floes even in the summer, so that they are connected with the Siberian mainland during the long winters. The climate is severe and summers last only about two months.

This island group belongs to the Krasnoyarsk Krai administrative division of the Russian Federation.

=== Islands ===
The main islands are (from East to West):

- Morzhovo Island, with a diameter of only 4 km (2.5 mi), is the closest to land. It is only about 11 km (6.8 mi) from the Siberian coastline.
- Rastorguyev Island. It is long and narrow, and about 15 km (9.3 mi) in length. It is occasionally confused with Kolchak Island (which is located further east in the Kara Sea along the coast south of the Nordenskiold Archipelago, and until 2005, used to also be known as Rastorguyev Island).
- Vostochny Island, is the largest in the group; 17 km (11 mi) in length and 9 km (5.6 mi) wide.
- Zapadny Kamenny Island, roughly circular in shape; 8.5 km (5.3 mi) in diameter.

== History ==
These islands were explored by Russian geologist Baron Eduard Von Toll during an expedition on behalf of the Imperial Russian Academy of Sciences. However, they were known from at least the time of Nordenskiold

The island group is included in the Great Arctic State Nature Reserve of the Russian Arctic.

== See also ==
- List of islands of Russia
