= Aru, Saare County =

Village in Estonia

Coordinates: 58°32′23″N 22°41′59″E

Aru
- Village
- Interactive map of Aru
- Country: Estonia
- County: Saare County
- Parish: Saaremaa Parish
- Time zone: UTC+2 (EET)
  - Summer (DST): UTC+3 (EEST)

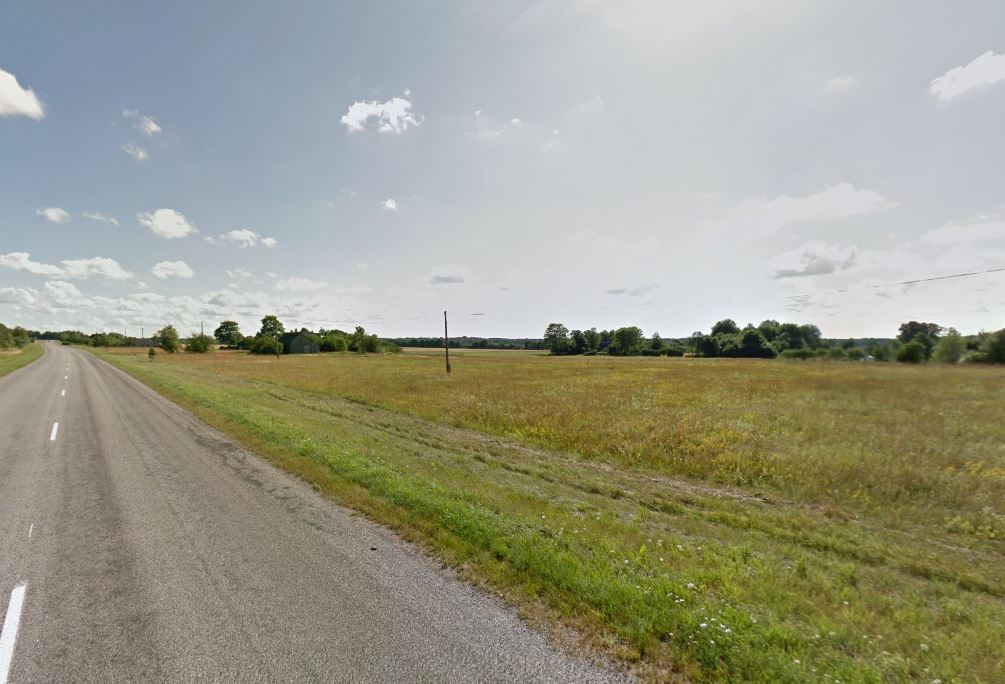

Aru is a village in Saaremaa Parish, Saare County, in western Estonia. Before the administrative reform in 2017, the village was in Leisi Parish.
