= Lake Taymyr =

Lake in Krasnoyarsk Krai, Russia

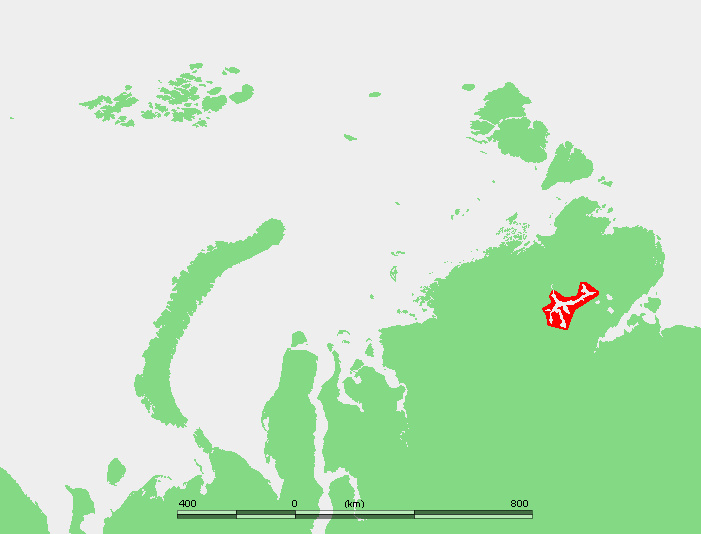
- Location of Lake Taymyr in the center of the Taymyr Peninsula

- Location within Krasnoyarsk Krai
- Location: Taymyr Peninsula, Taymyrsky Dolgano-Nenetsky District, Krasnoyarsk Krai, Russia
- Coordinates: 74°32′34″N 101°38′39″E
- Primary inflows: Zapadnaya, Severnaya, Bikada-Nguoma, Yamu-Tarida, Kalamissamo, Upper Taymyra
- Primary outflows: Lower Taymyra
- Catchment area: 104,300 km^{2} (40,300 sq mi)
- Basin countries: Russia
- Max. length: 204 km (127 mi)
- Max. width: 154 km (96 mi)
- Surface area: 4,560 km^{2} (1,760 sq mi)
- Average depth: 2.8 m (9.2 ft)
- Max. depth: 26 m (85 ft)
- Water volume: 12.8 km^{3} (3.1 cu mi)
- Surface elevation: 6 m (20 ft)
- Frozen: late September until June
- Islands: 20
- Settlements: none

Lake Taymyr (Russian: Таймыр, Таймырское озеро, romanized: Taymyr, Taymyrskoye ozero) is a lake of the central regions of the Taymyr Peninsula in Krasnoyarsk Krai, Russian Federation. It is located south of the Byrranga Mountains.

== Geography ==
Lake Taymyr is approximately 165 km (103 mi) roughly east-to-west. It has an irregular shape with many arms projecting in different directions that cover a wide region. Its maximum width, however, is only about 23 km (14 mi) in its broadest area, towards the lake's eastern end.

Lake Taymyr is covered with ice from late September until June. The main river flowing into its basin, from the west, is the Upper Taymyra. Other rivers flowing into it are the Zapadnaya, Severnaya, Bikada-Nguoma, Yamu-Tarida and Kalamissamo. The Lower Taymyra flows out of the lake northwards across the Byrranga mountain region.

The tundra areas south of Lake Taymyr are full of smaller lakes and marshes. There are two quite large lakes east and southeast of the easternmost part of Lake Taymyr, Yamuneru Bay: 33 km (21 mi) east is Lake Kungusalakh, and 72 km (45 mi) southeast is Lake Portnyagino. Both lakes are about 20 km (12 mi) across.

== Ecology ==
Lake Taymyr is teeming with many kinds of fish typical of cold Arctic waters, such as loach, common whitefish, and muksun. Salvelinus taimyricus, is a char species found in the lake. There is overexploitation of some fish species despite the remoteness of the area.

Slight plutonium contamination has been detected in the sediments of Lake Taymyr. This is perhaps a consequence of wind-carried particles after the numerous atmospheric nuclear tests in Novaya Zemlya during the Cold War.

== Water temperatures ==
- Average water temperature in August: +7 °C (45 °F)
- During winter, water temperature is slightly above +1 °C (34 °F)
Lake Taymyr

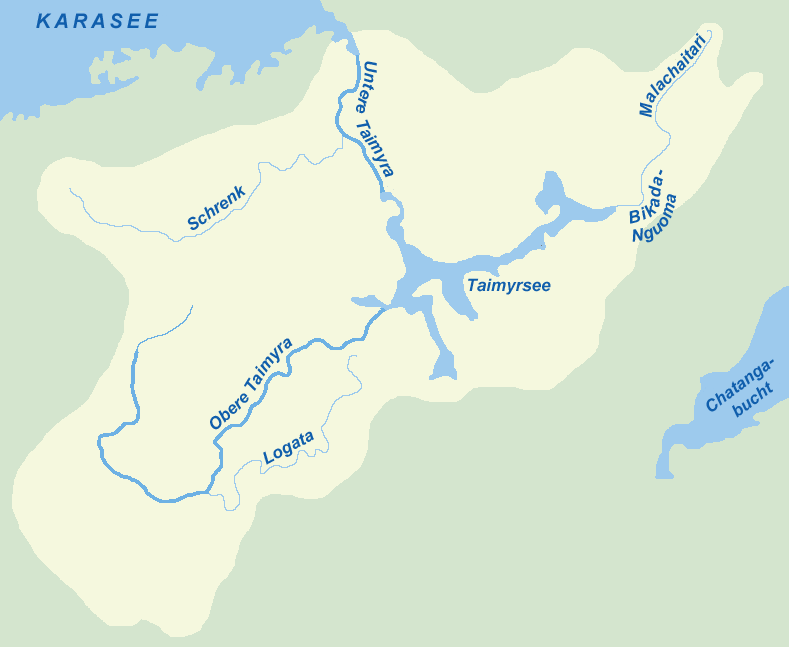
Catchment Area

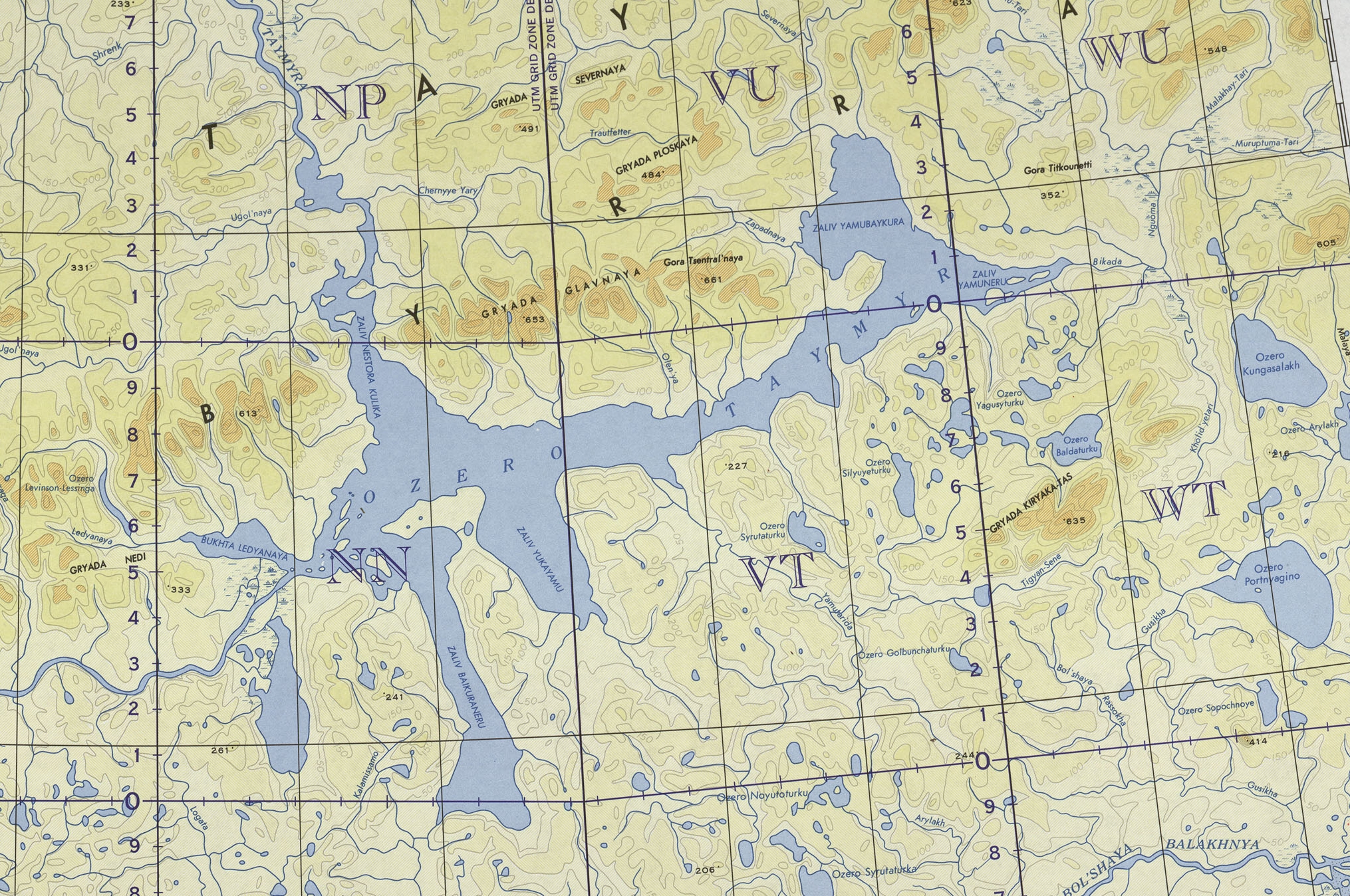
Lake Taymyr. US military map 1964 г.
