= Taymyra =

River in Krasnoyarsk Krai, Russia

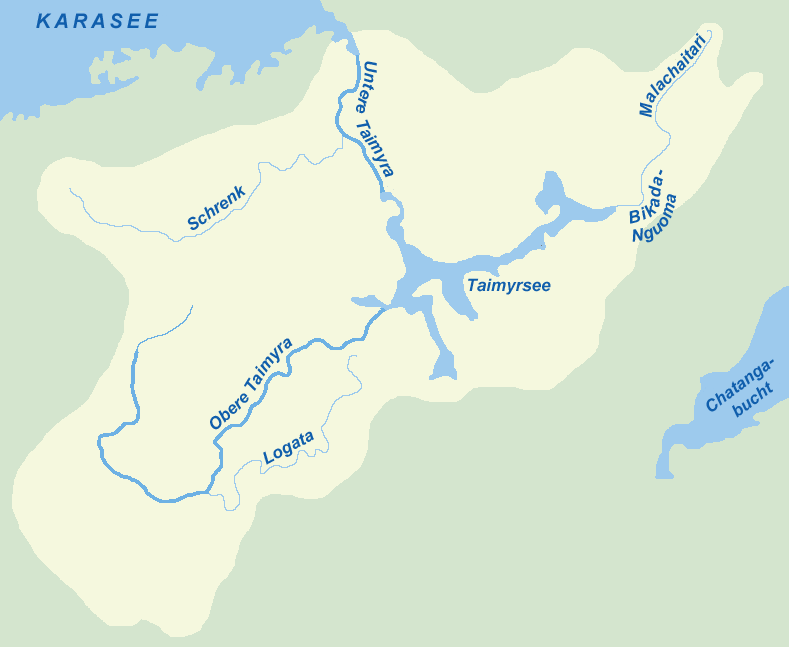
- Basin of the Taymyra
- Native name: Таймыра (Russian)

Location
- Country: Russia
- Region: Krasnoyarsk Krai

Physical characteristics
- Source: Byrranga Mountains
  - location: Taymyrsky Dolgano-Nenetsky District, Krasnoyarsk Krai
  - coordinates: 74°23′24″N 95°04′23″E
  - elevation: 150 m (490 ft)
- Mouth: Kara Sea
  - location: Taymyrsky Dolgano-Nenetsky District, Krasnoyarsk Krai
  - coordinates: 76°06′40″N 99°47′20″E
  - elevation: 0 m (0 ft)
- Length: 840 km (520 mi)(total)
- Basin size: 124,000 km^{2} (48,000 sq mi)
- Discharge
  - average: 990 m^{3}/s (35,000 cu ft/s)

The Taymyra (Russian: Таймыра) is a river in Krasnoyarsk Krai, Russia. It is located in the middle of the Taymyr Peninsula and flows into the Kara sea. It is about 840 kilometres (520 mi) long and has a drainage basin of 124,000 square kilometres (48,000 sq mi).

The Taymyra is the most northerly river system of its size or greater, the largest river whose basin is wholly north of the Arctic Circle, and also the largest with a basin lying entirely above the polar tree line.

== Course ==
- The Upper Taymyra (Verkhnyaya Taymyra) flows into Lake Taymyr from the west and is the largest river flowing into the lake basin. Its length is 567 km counting the 68 km stretch of the main one of its source rivers (Russian: Первая Голова Таймыры). Its main tributary is the Logata, coming from the right. The length of its course in the Taymyr Lake is 86 km.
- The Lower Taymyra (Nizhnyaya Taymyra) flows out of Lake Taymyr northwards across the Byrranga mountain region into the Taymyr Gulf. Its length is 187 km. The river's mouth forms an estuary where its waters join the Kara Sea. The Lower Taymyra freezes up in late September or early October and stays under the ice until June on an average year. Its main tributary is the Shrenk, coming from the left.
