= Taymyr Gulf =

Gulf in the Kara Sea

- Таймырская губа (Russian)
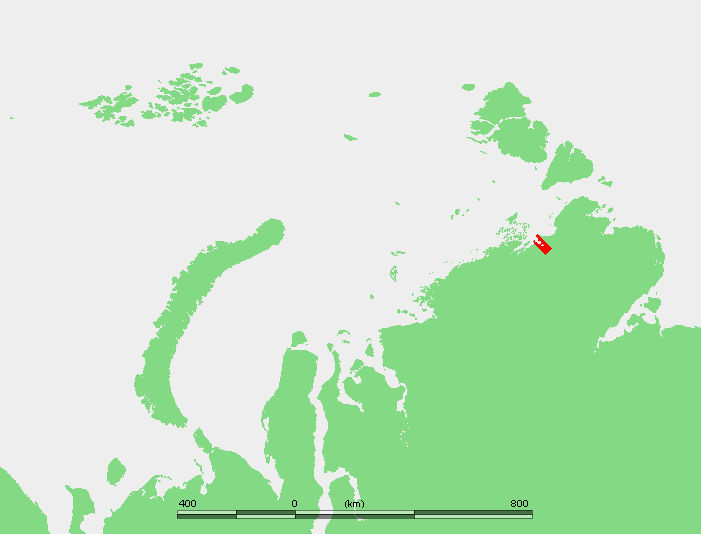
- Location of the Taymyr Gulf in the Kara Sea.

- Location within Krasnoyarsk Krai
- Location: Kara Sea
- Coordinates: 76°04′N 99°30′E
- River sources: Lower Taymyra
- Basin countries: Russia

Map showing the Taymyr Gulf in the lower left corner.

The Taymyr Gulf (Russian: Таймырская губа, romanized: Taymyrskaya guba; also known as Taymyr Bay, Russian: Таймырский залив, romanized: Taymyrsky zaliv) is a gulf in the Kara Sea that includes the estuary of the Lower Taymyra.

The estuary proper is frozen for about nine months in a year and even in summer it is never quite free of ice floes. Fishes like the golets and the muksun are very common in its waters.

== Geography ==
The estuary opens roughly northwestwards from the western coast of the Taymyr Peninsula into the eastern expanses of the Kara Sea, widening from about 4 km at the river's mouth to about 20 km. Its length, including the wider gulf, is about 50 km, and its width roughly 40 km.

Taymyr Island is located about 60 km westwards from the mouth of the estuary. Beyond Cape Oscar, the headland of the Oscar Peninsula that limits the gulf to the northeast, lies the Toll Bay.

The climate in the desolate area of the Taymyr Gulf is severe, with long and bitter winters and frequent blizzards and gales.

=== Islands ===
The most important islands in the Taymyr Gulf are the following:

- Chelyuskin Island is the first island at the mouth of the gulf.
- Bera Island or Baer Island (Остров Бера) is 3.5 km long. It is located in the middle of the mouth of the gulf, about 13 km from the Kara Sea 76°13′N 99°22′E. This island was named after Baltic-German scholar Karl Ernst von Baer. Baer made important contributions to the research of Arctic meteorology between 1830 and 1840.
- The Nanosnyye Islands are four small islands, the largest of which is 5 km long and 2 km wide. They are located in the mouth of the estuary, right at the opening of the gulf.
- Fomin Island (Остров Фомин) is 11.5 km long and 3.7 km wide. It is located deep within the estuary, dividing the last stretch of the Taymyr River into two branches. 75°52′N 99°46′E. This island was named after early Russian Arctic explorer Nikifor Fomin.

== History ==
In the 1740s, during the Great Northern Expedition, Nikifor Fomin reached Bera Island and built a hut in order to winter there.

The Taymyr Gulf and its islands were explored by Alexander von Middendorff during his expedition to Siberia (1842–1845). Bera Island was the farthest northern point he reached after exploring the Taymyr River from the south towards its estuary in August 1843.

Baron Eduard von Toll during his last expedition, the Russian Polar Expedition of 1900-1903, explored the mouth of the Taymyr Gulf. Toll found a quartz boulder on Bera Island that had been described by Middendorff. He also found the remains of Nikifor Fomin's hut.

Nowadays the Taymyr Gulf is part of the Great Arctic State Nature Reserve, the largest nature reserve of Russia.

== Administration ==
The Taymyr Gulf and all its surrounding area belongs to the Krasnoyarsk Krai administrative division of the Russian Federation.
