= Eduard von Toll =

Russian geologist and polar explorer (1858–1902)

Freiherr Eduard von Toll
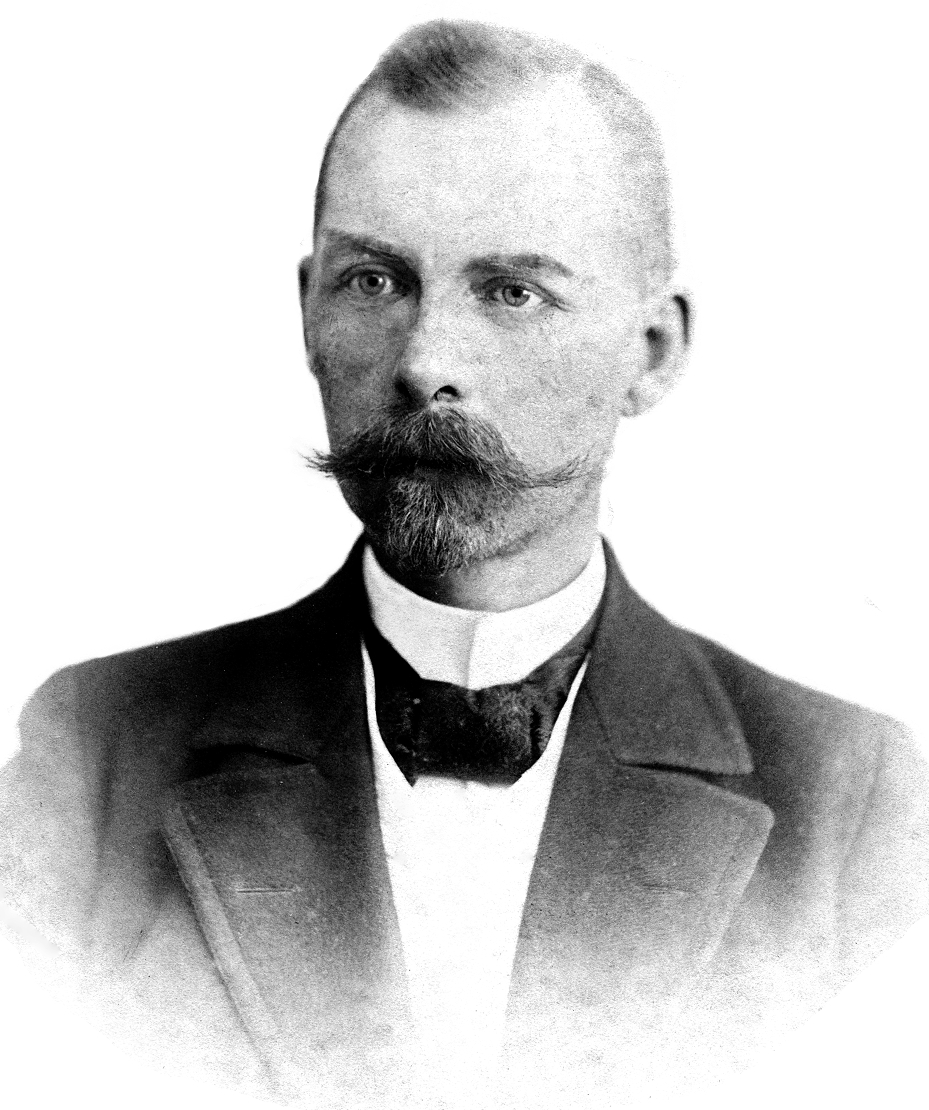
- Toll, c. 1900
- Born: 14 March [O.S. 2 March] 1858; Reval, Russian Empire
- Disappeared: 26 October 1902 (aged 44); East Siberian Sea
- Status: Missing for 123 years, 11 months and 24 days
- Education: Imperial University of Dorpat
- Occupations: Explorer; geologist; naturalist
- Known for: Exploring the New Siberian Islands and leading the Russian polar expedition of 1900–1902 of the Sannikov Land

Signature
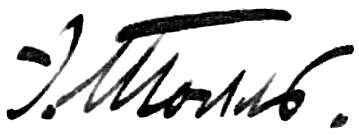

Eduard Gustav Freiherr von Toll (Russian: Эдуард Васильевич Толль, romanized: Eduard Vasilyevich Toll; 14 March [O.S. 2 March] 1858 – disappeared 26 October 1902), also known as Baron von Toll, was a Russian geologist and Arctic explorer of Baltic German descent. He led the Russian polar expedition of 1900–1902 in search of the legendary Sannikov Land, a phantom island purported to lie off Russia's Arctic coast. During the expedition, Toll and a small party of explorers disappeared from Bennett Island, and their fate remains unknown to this day.

== Early life ==
Eduard von Toll was born on 14 March [O.S. 2 March] 1858, in Reval of the Governorate of Estonia (now Tallinn, Estonia). He belonged to the Baltic German noble Toll family and was married to Emmeline "Emmy" Magdalene von Wilcken. His family's origin was debated, but genealogists had suggested them to be from Leiden in the County of Holland. He was a close relative of the Middendorff family, and one of the Toll's teachers was the academician of the Imperial Academy of Sciences Alexander von Middendorff.

Toll graduated from the Imperial University of Dorpat (Tartu) as a zoologist in 1882. As a student, he had travelled to the Mediterranean and researched the fauna, flora and geology of Algeria and the Balearic Islands.

== Expeditions and surveys ==
In 1885–1886 Toll took part in an expedition to the New Siberian Islands, organized by the St. Petersburg Academy of Sciences and led by Alexander Bunge. Eduard Toll explored the Great Lyakhovsky Island, Bunge Land, Faddeyevsky Island, Kotelny Island, as well as the western shores of the New Siberia Island. In 1886 Toll thought that he had seen an unknown land north of Kotelny. He guessed that this was the so-called "Zemlya Sannikova" (Sannikov Land), a land that Yakov Sannikov and Matvei Gedenschtrom claimed to have seen during their 1808–1810 expedition, but whose existence had never been proved.

Eduard Toll was among the first to report in detail about the abundance of Pleistocene fossils found within Bolshoy Lyakhovsky Island, one of the New Siberian Islands. Under a peat composed of water mosses covering what he described as "perpetual ice", now known to be permafrost, Toll found fragments of willow and the bones of post-Neogene mammals, like the shoulder-bone of a sabre-toothed tiger. He also reported having found in a frozen, sandy clay layer and lying on its side, a complete Alnus fruticosa tree 15 to 20 ft (4.5 to 6 m) in length, including roots, with leaves and cones adhering. His reports have been frequently either misrepresented or badly garbled by popular accounts of his findings, stating it to be a plum tree of a different size. The academy appreciated the results of this expedition as "a true geographical deed".

In 1893 Toll led an expedition of the Petersburg Academy of Sciences to the northern parts of Yakutia and explored the region between the lower reaches of the Lena and Khatanga Rivers. He became the first to map the plateau between the Anabar and Popigay Rivers and a mountain ridge between the Olenek and Anabar Rivers (which he named after Vasily Pronchischev). He also carried out geological surveys in the basins of the following rivers: Yana, Indigirka, and Kolyma. In one year and two days the expedition covered 25,000 km, of which 4,200 km were up the rivers, carrying out geodesic surveys en route. Owing to the difficulties of the expedition and his hard work, the Russian Academy of Sciences awarded Toll the N.M. Przhevalsky Large Silver Medal.

In 1899 Toll took part in a voyage of the icebreaker Yermak under the command of Stepan Makarov to the shores of Spitsbergen.

== Toll's last venture: the Russian Polar Expedition, 1900–1903 ==
In 1900–1902, Toll headed an expedition of the Petersburg Academy of Sciences to the New Siberian Islands, the Russian Polar Expedition, on the ship Zarya (Заря). The expedition primarily aimed to find the legendary Sannikov Land. During this voyage and especially during the winters near the northwestern part of the Taymyr Peninsula and the western part of the Kotelny Island, Toll conducted extensive hydrographical, geographical, and geological research.

Due to severe ice conditions the expedition had to spend two winters in the region of the bleak New Siberian Archipelago. In the end, Toll travelled to Bennett Island by sledge and kayak along with three expedition members.

The ship Zarya attempted to reach Bennett Island to evacuate Toll's party but was unable to do so because of severe ice conditions. Apparently, Toll made a decision to go south to the continent; no further traces of the four men have ever been found.

Two search parties set out in early 1903. One of them, under engineer Mikhail Brusnev, searched the shores of the New Siberian Islands; the other, under naval commander Aleksandr Kolchak, travelled by whaleboat to Bennett Island. They did not find the lost explorers but they found the diaries and the collections of the Zarya expedition, which shed light on the tragic fate of Toll and his companions.

== Legacy ==
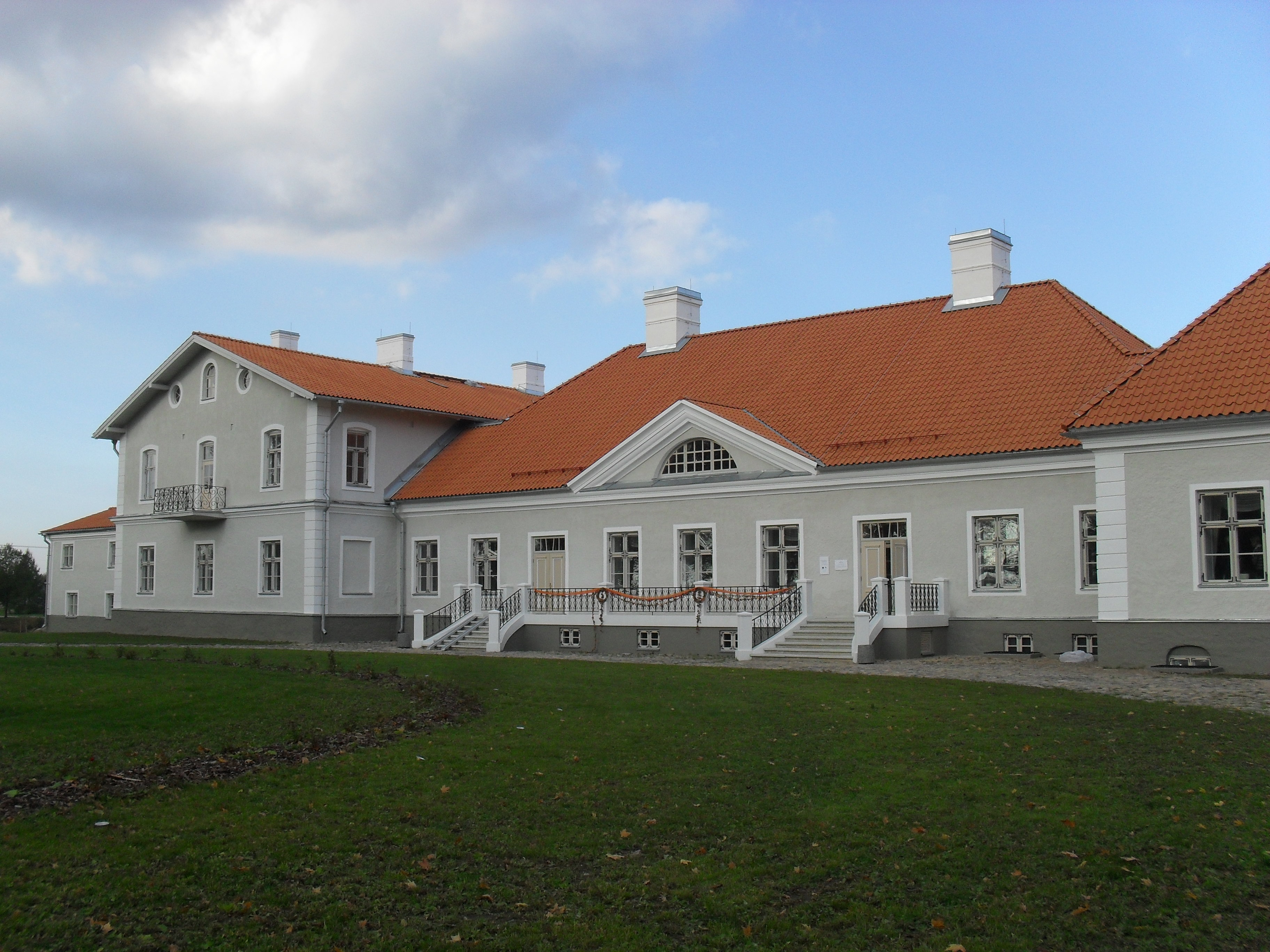
Kuckers Manor where Eduard von Toll lived

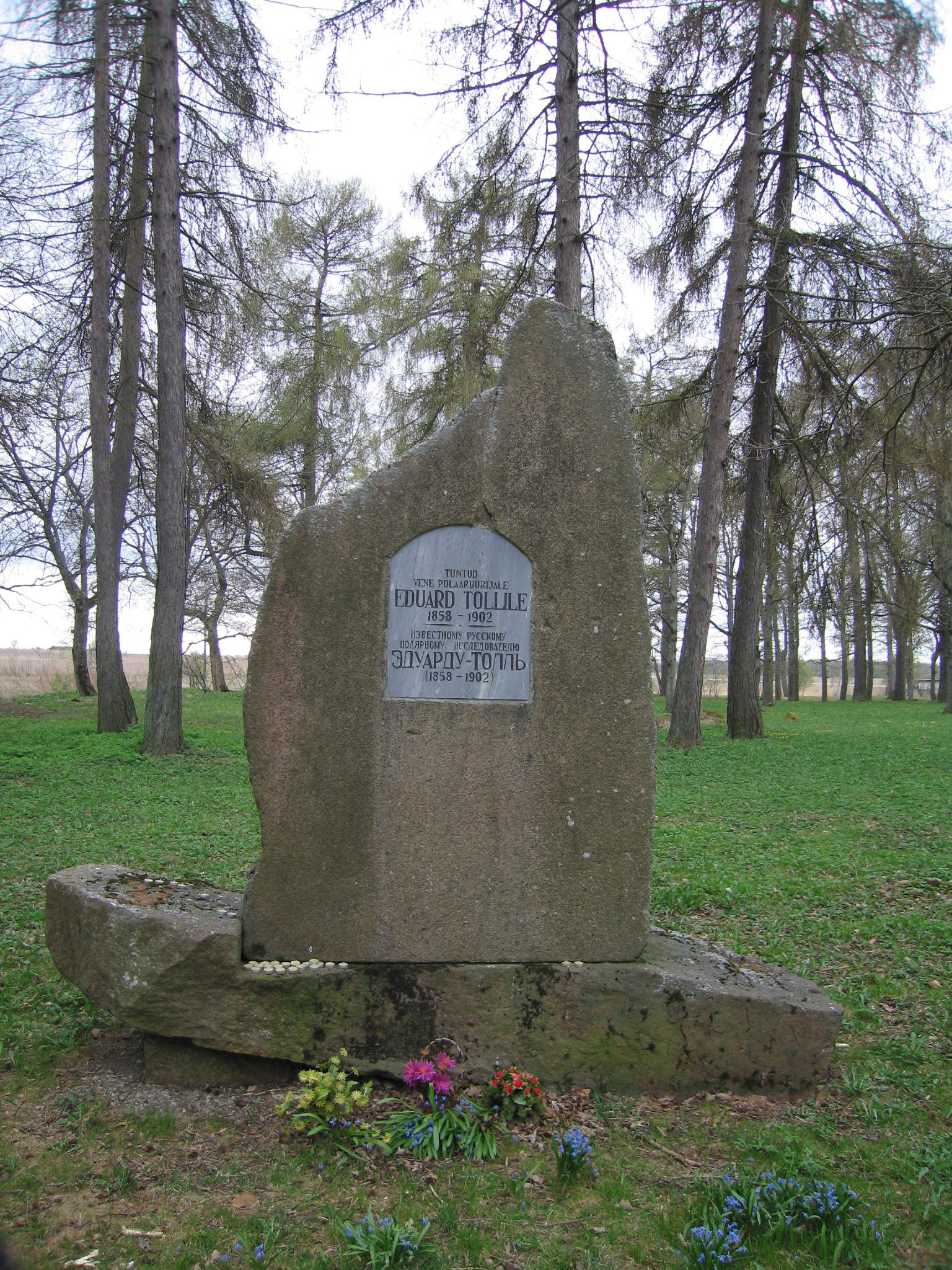
Memorial to Toll, at the site of Kuckers Manor

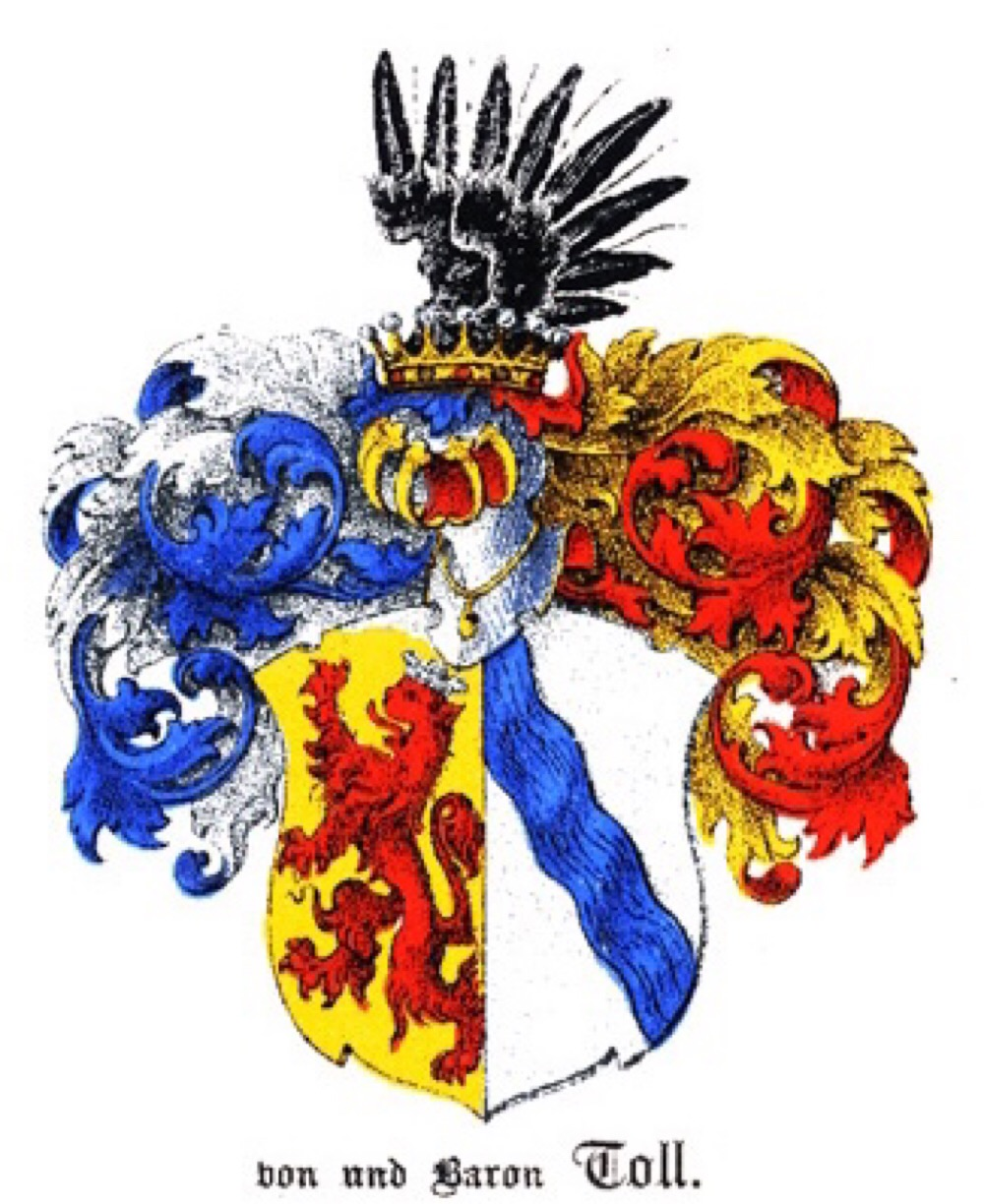
Coat of arms of the barons of the Toll family, in the Baltic coat of arms book by Carl Arvid von Klingspor in 1882.

The name of Eduard von Toll remained on the geographical maps Fridtjof Nansen published. In 1893, he named the Toll Bay on the north-west coast of the Taymyr Peninsula in honour of Eduard von Toll. There is also the Tollievaya River, a cape on the Tsirkul Island in the Minina Skerries, mountains in Novaya Zemlya, the northernmost cape at Stolbovoy Island, the strait and a plateau at Kotelny Island and the central ice cap at Bennett Island.

In certain fields, like paleontology, zoology and botany many specimens of fauna and flora are named after Baron Eduard von Toll, like for example the foraminiferan named Dendrophyra tolli (Awerinzew, 1911).

Baron Toll was an expert in Siberian palaeontology. The following statement of Russian Academician V. A. Obruchev is well-known: "In all our guides on physical geography you can encounter the name of Eduard v. Toll as the founder of the doctrine of fossilized ice formation' – the doctrine which became a classic one".

The Arctic icebreaking LNG tanker MV Eduard Toll is named after him.

== See also ==
- List of Baltic Germans § Scientists
- List of people who disappeared mysteriously at sea
- Nikolai Kolomeitsev

== Sources ==
- "Толь, Эдуард" . Brockhaus and Efron Encyclopedic Dictionary (in Russian). 1906.
- William Barr, (1980) "Baron Eduard von Toll's Last Expedition: The Russian Polar Expedition, 1900–1903 ", Arctic, 34 (3: September), pp. 201–224
- A. Bunge & E. von Toll, The Expedition to the New Siberian Islands and the Jana country, equipped by the Imperial Academy of Sciences, 1887
