= Russian Arctic islands =

Several islands in the Arctic Ocean

Coordinates: 74°46′32″N 57°33′46″E

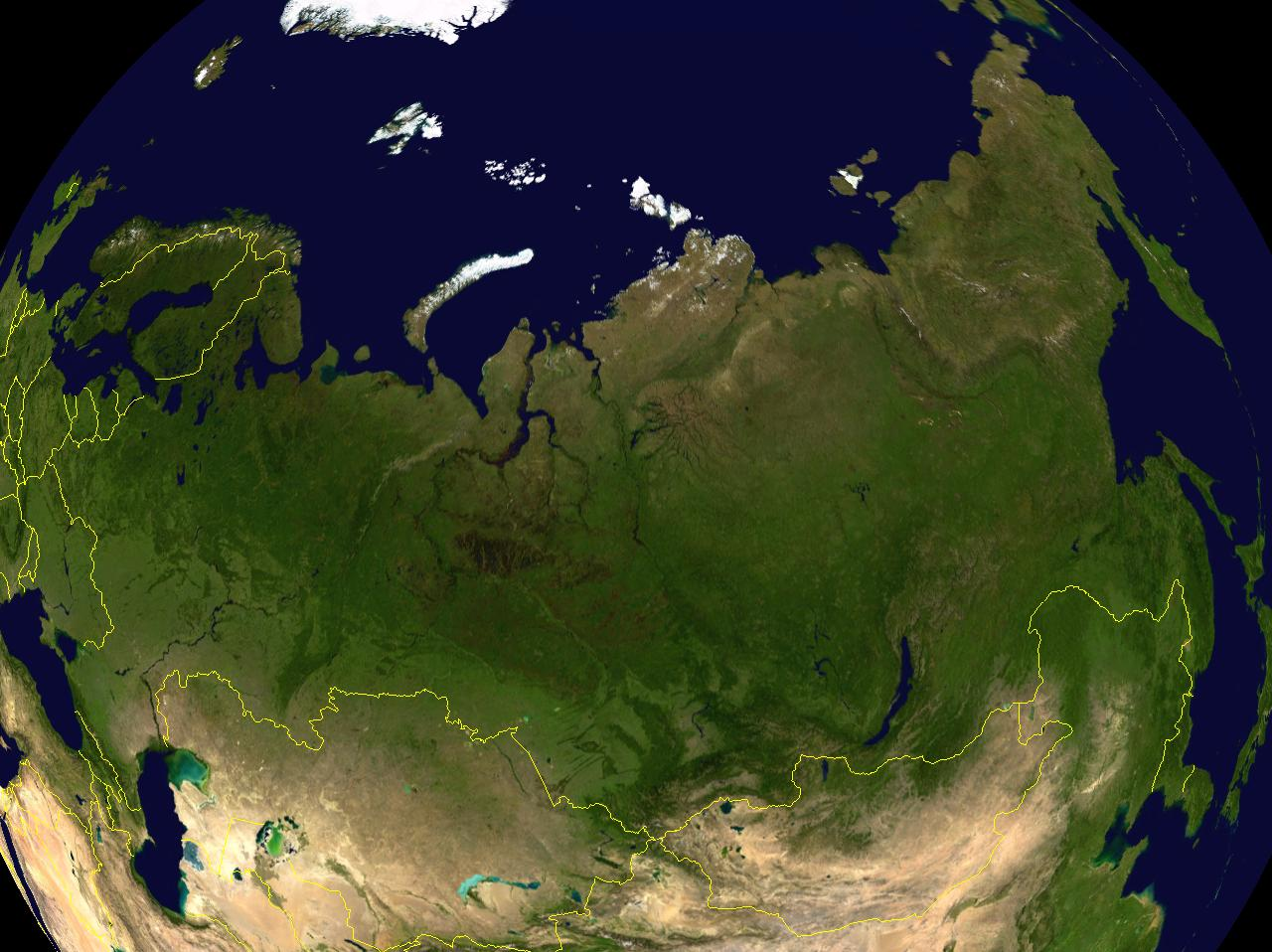
Satellite image

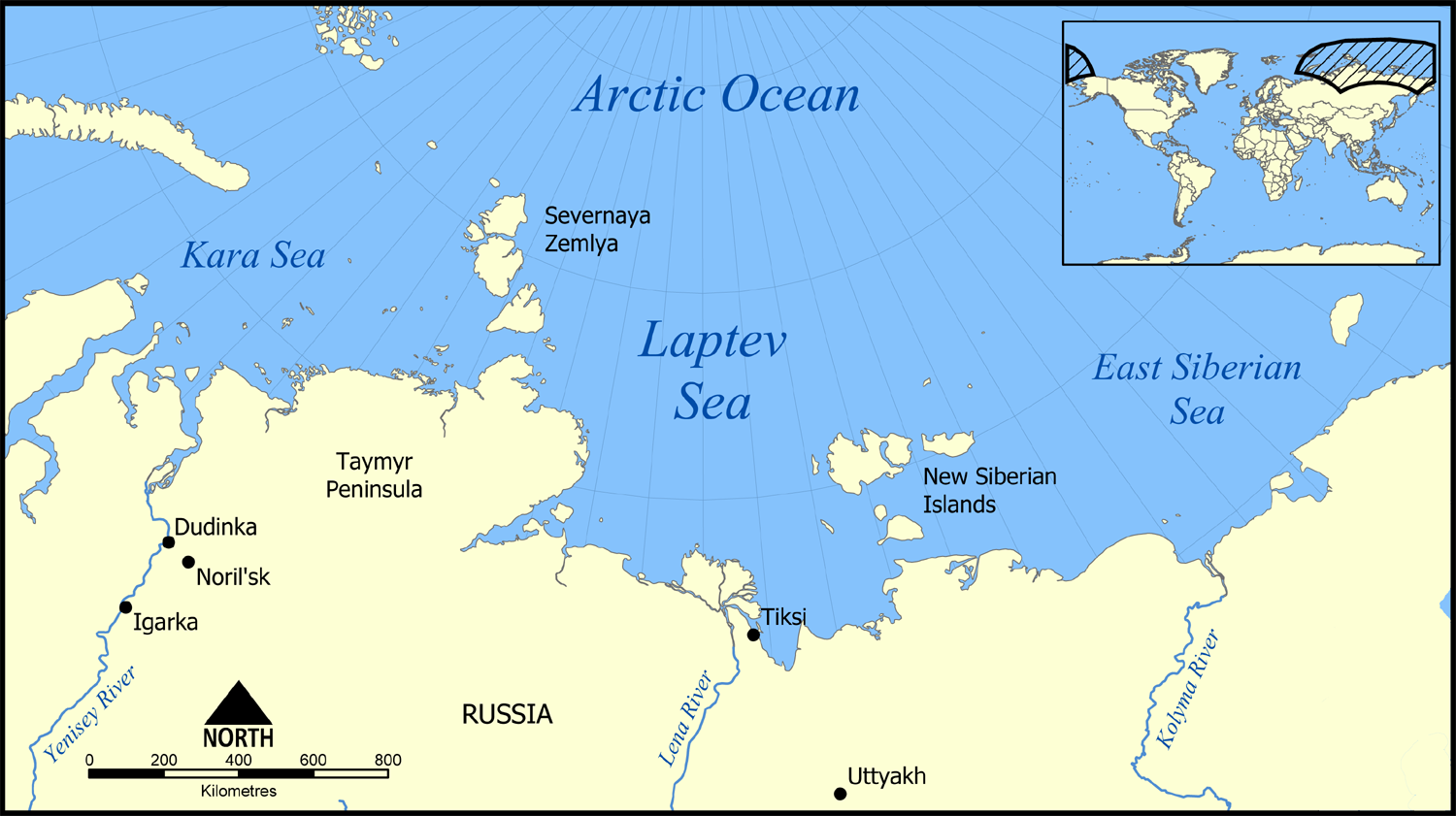
map

The Russian Arctic islands are a number of islands groups and sole islands scattered around the Arctic Ocean.

== Geography ==
The islands are all situated within the Arctic Circle and are scattered through the marginal seas of the Arctic Ocean, namely, the Barents Sea, Kara Sea, Laptev Sea, East Siberian Sea, Chukchi Sea and Bering Sea. The area extends some 7,000 kilometres (4,300 miles) from Karelia in the west to the Chukchi Peninsula in the east.

The largest of the Arctic islands is Severny Island, with an area of about 48,904 km^{2} (18,882 sq mi). It is Russia's second largest island next to Sakhalin Island, and the fourth largest island in Europe.

== History ==
The Russian Empire officially claimed the Arctic islands to its north in a Note of the Russian Government of 20 September 1916 - this covered the islands of Henrietta, Jeannette, Bennett, Herald, Edinenie, New Siberia, Wrangel, Novaya Zemlya, Kolguev, Vaigach and others. On 15 April 1926, the Soviet Union reaffirmed this claim.

== Islands ==
The area includes from west to east:

- Victoria Island (Остров Виктория; Ostrov Viktoriya), about 14 km^{2} (5.4 sq mi)
- Franz Josef Land (Земля Франца Иосифа; Zemlya Frantsa-Iosifa), about 16,134 km^{2} (6,229 sq mi)
  - Zemlya Georga (Земля Георга, Zemlya Georga), about 2,821 km^{2} (1,089 sq mi)
  - Wilczek Land (Земля Вильчека; Zemlya Vil'cheka), about 2,203 km^{2} (851 sq mi)
  - Graham Bell Island, (Остров Греэм-Белл, Ostrov Graham Bell), about 1,557 km^{2} (601 sq mi)
  - Alexandra Land (Земля Александры, Zemlya Aleksandry), about 1,130 km^{2} (440 sq mi)
  - Hall Island (Arctic) (Остров Галля, Ostrov Gallya), about 1,049 km^{2} (405 sq mi)
  - Salisbury Island (Остров Солсбери; Ostrov Solsberi), about 960 km^{2} (370 sq mi)
- Kolguyev Island (о́стров Колгу́ев, Ostrov Kolguev), about 3,497 km^{2} (1,350 sq mi)
- Novaya Zemlya (Новая Земля, Novaya Zemlya), about 90,605 km^{2} (34,983 sq mi)
  - Severny Island (остров Сeверный, Severny ostrov), about 48,904 km^{2} (18,882 sq mi)
  - Yuzhny Island ( Южный остров, Yuzhny ostrov), about 33,275 km^{2} (12,848 sq mi)
  - Vaygach Island, Вайгaч, Vaygach), about 3,398 km^{2} (1,312 sq mi)
- Bely Island, (Остров Белый, Ostrov Beliy), about 1,810 km^{2} (700 sq mi)
- Shokalsky Island, (Остров Шокальского, Ostrov Shokal'skogo), about 428 km^{2} (165 sq mi)
- Vilkitsky Island (Kara Sea), (Остров Вильки́цкого; Ostrov Vil'kitskogo), about 154 km^{2} (59 sq mi)
- Oleniy Island, (Остров Олений, Ostrov Oleniy), about 1,197 km^{2} (462 sq mi)
- Zapovednik Islands (Острова Заповедник), about 4,921 km^{2} (1,900 sq mi)
  - Dikson - Sibiryakov Islands, (Диксон-Сибиряковский острова), about 871 km^{2} (336 sq mi)
  - The Kara Sea Islands, (Острова Карского моря), about 4,000 km^{2} (1,500 sq mi)
    - Sverdrup Island, (Остров Свердруп, Ostrov Sverdup)
    - Arkticheskiy Institut Islands, (Острова Арктического института, Ostrova Arkticheskogo Instituta), about 259 km2 (100 sq mi)
    - Izvestiy TSIK Islands, (Острова Известий ЦИК, Ostrova Izvetsiy TsIK), about 102 km2 (39 sq mi)
    - Uedineniya Island, (Остров Уединения, Ostrov Uedineniya)
    - Sergei Kirov Islands, (Острова Сергея Кирова, Ostrova Sergeya Kirova)
    - Voronina Island, (Острова Воронина, Ostrova Voronina)
    - Taymyr Island, (Остров Таймыр, Ostrova Taymyr)
    - Kolchak Island, (Остров Колчака, Ostrov Kolchaka)
    - Minina Skerries, (Шхеры Минина, Shhery Minina) and number of smaller islands.
  - Nordenskiöld Archipelago (Архипелаг Норденшельда, Arkhipelag Nordenshel'da), about 50 km^{2} (19 sq mi)
    - Litke Islands (острова Литке; Ostrova Litke)
    - Tsivolko Islands (острова Циволько; Ostrova Tsivolko)
    - Pakhatusov Islands (острова Пахтусова; Ostrova Pakhtusova)
    - Vostochnyye Islands (Восточные острова; Ostrova Vostochnyye, Eastern Islands)
    - Vilkitsky Islands (острова Вилькицкого, Ostrova Vilkitskogo)
    - Lafetenyye and Prolifnyye Islands (Ostrova Lafetnyye i Prolivnyye)
- Vize Island (Остров Визе, Ostrov Vize), about 289 km^{2} (112 sq mi)
- Ushakov Island (Остров Ушакова, Ostrov Ushakova), about 328 km^{2} (127 sq mi)
- Severnaya Zemlya (Северная Земля, Severnaja Zemlja), about 36,554 km^{2} (14,114 sq mi)
  - October Revolution Island (Остров Октябрьской Революции, Ostrov Oktyabrskoy Revolyutsii), about 14,170 km^{2} (5,470 sq mi)
  - Bolshevik Island (о́стров Большеви́к, Ostrov Bolshevik), about 11,206 km^{2} (4,327 sq mi)
  - Komsomolets Island (остров Комсомолец, Ostrov Komsomolets), about 8,812 km^{2} (3,402 sq mi)
  - Pioneer Island (остров Пионeр, Ostrov Pioner), about 1,527 km^{2} (590 sq mi)
- Bolshoy Begichev Island, (Большой Бегичев, Bolshoy Begichev), about 1,764 km^{2} (681 sq mi)
- New Siberian Islands (Новосиби́рские острова, Novosibirskiye Ostrova), about 36,290 km^{2} (14,010 sq mi)
  - Anzhu Islands (Острова Анжу, Ostrova Anzhu), about 29,900 km^{2} (11,500 sq mi)
  - De Long Islands (Острова Де-Лонга, Ostrova De-Longa), about 228 km^{2} (88 sq mi)
  - Lyakhovsky Islands (Ляховские острова, Ostrova Lyakhovskiye), about 6,100 km^{2} (2,400 sq mi)
- Medvezhyi Islands (Медвежьи острова, Medvezhyi ostrova), about 65 km^{2} (25 sq mi)
- Ayon Island (Айон, Ayon), about 2,000 km^{2} (770 sq mi)
- Wrangel Island (остров Врaнгеля, Ostrov Vrangelya), about 7,608 km^{2} (2,937 sq mi)
- Big Diomede (остров Ратманова, Ostrov Ratmanova), about 29 km^{2} (11 sq mi)
