= Labyrintovye Islands =

Group of flat islands in the Pyasina Bay of the Kara Sea

Coordinates: 74°16′N 85°32′E

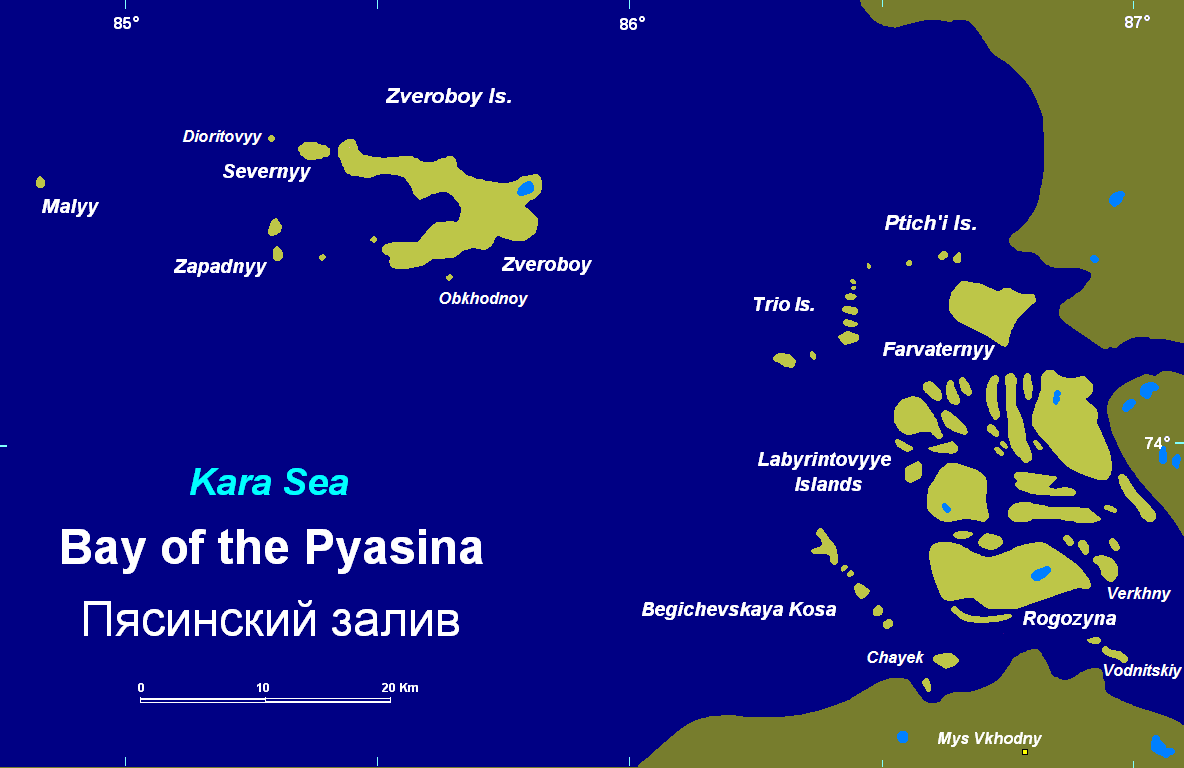
The Labyrintovye Islands in the gulf of the Pyasina.

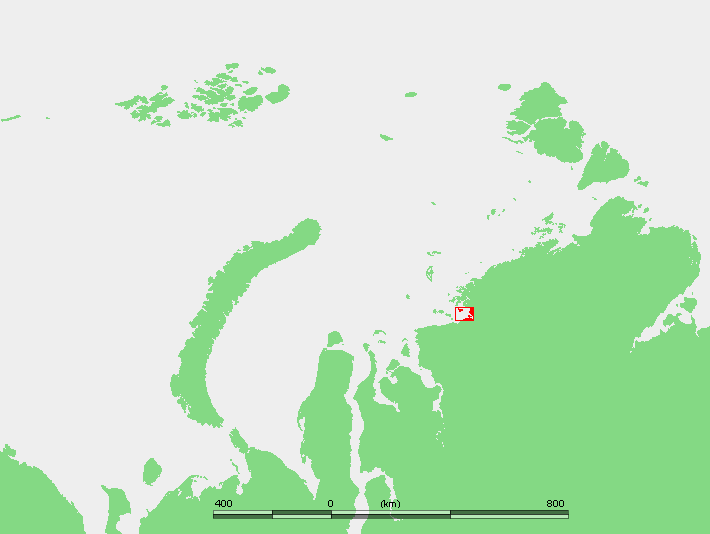
Location of the Labyrintovye Islands in the Kara Sea.

The Labyrintovye Islands (Russian: Лабиринтовые острова; Labyrintovye Ostrova) is a group of flat islands in the Pyasina Bay of the Kara Sea. They are located at the mouth of the river Pyasina. Their latitude is 73° 50' N and their longitude 86° 45' E.

These islands form a compact group that has been formed by river sediments. Rogozyna (Ru. Rogozynskogo) is the largest and southernmost island and it is 15 km in length. Other important islands are Chaek and Bolshoy Labyrintovy. All these islands are marshy and covered with tundra vegetation and lakes.

The sea surrounding the Labyrintovye Islands is covered with pack ice with some polynias in the winter and there are many ice floes even in the summer.

The climate in the area is Arctic, with long bitter winters and a short warmer period which barely allows the ice to melt.

These islands belong to the Krasnoyarsk Krai administrative division of the Russian Federation.

The Labyrintovye group is part of the Great Arctic State Nature Reserve of Russia and there is much aquatic life in the marshes, especially birds.

== See also ==
- Kara Sea
