= Zveroboy Islands =

Island group is located in the Pyasina Bay, in the Kara Sea

Coordinates: 74°16′N 85°32′E

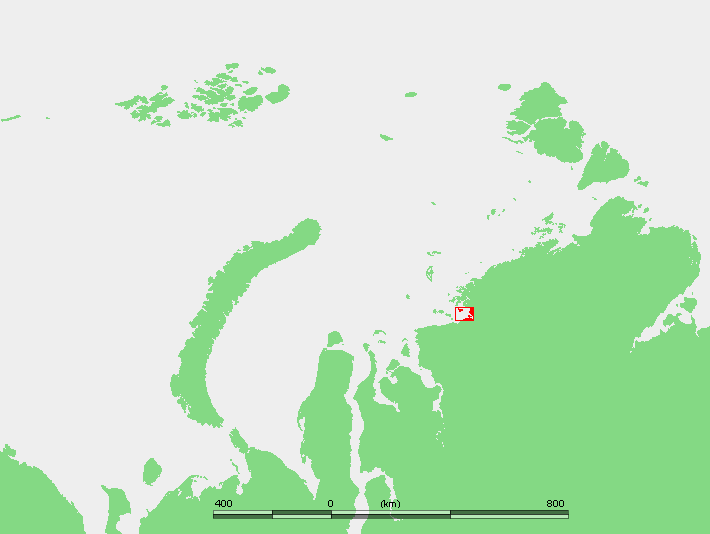
Location of the Zveroboy Islands in the Kara Sea.

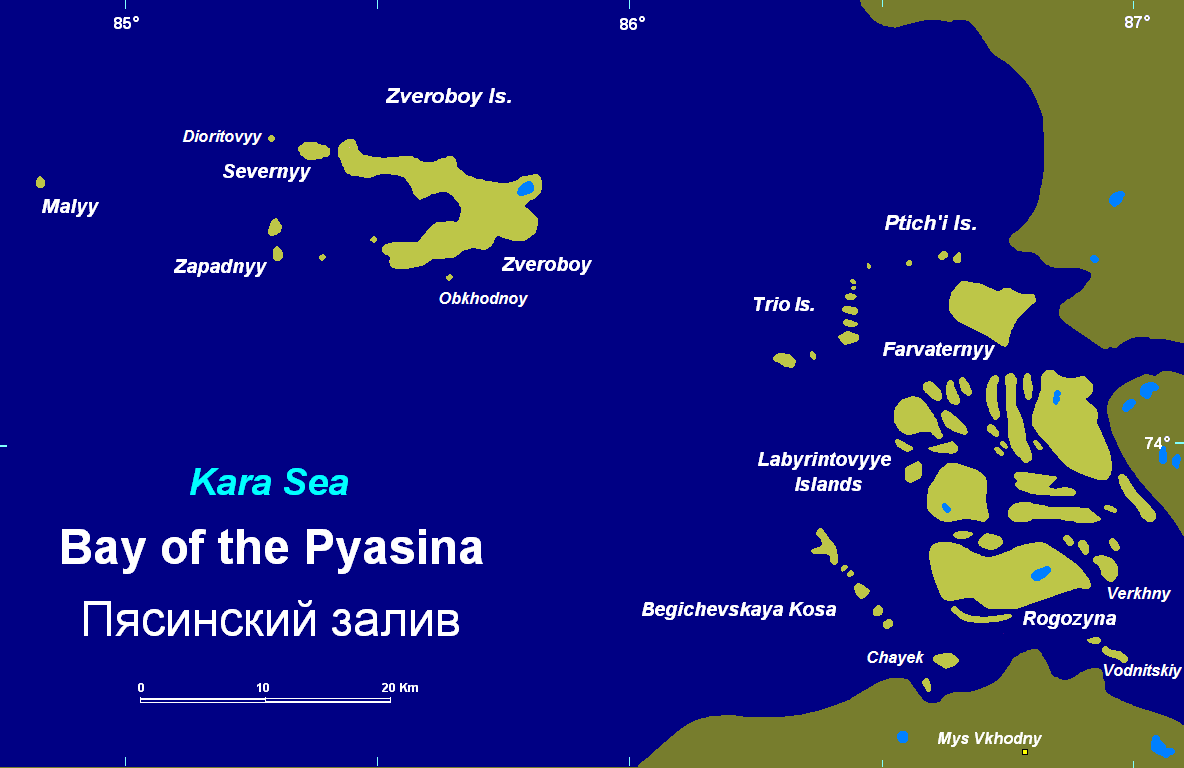
The Zveroboy Island group in the gulf of the Pyasina.

The Zveroboy Islands (Russian: Остров Зверобой, or Ostrov Zveroboy) is a group consisting of a large island (Zveroboy Island) and a few scattered small islets. The main island is 17 km in length. It is covered with tundra vegetation and has a lake. This island group is located in the Pyasina Bay, in the Kara Sea, northeast of Dikson, off the coast of Siberia.

The sea surrounding the Zveroboy Islands is covered with pack ice with some polynias in the winter and there are many ice floes even in the summer.

The climate in the area is Arctic, with long bitter winters and a short warmer period which barely allows the ice to melt.

These islands belong to the Krasnoyarsk Krai administrative division of the Russian Federation. The Zveroboy group is part of the Great Arctic State Nature Reserve of Russia.

== See also ==
- Kara Sea
