= Kurochkin Strait =

Strait in Russia which connects the Kara Sea with the Pyasina Bay

Coordinates: 73°48′09″N 84°42′21″E

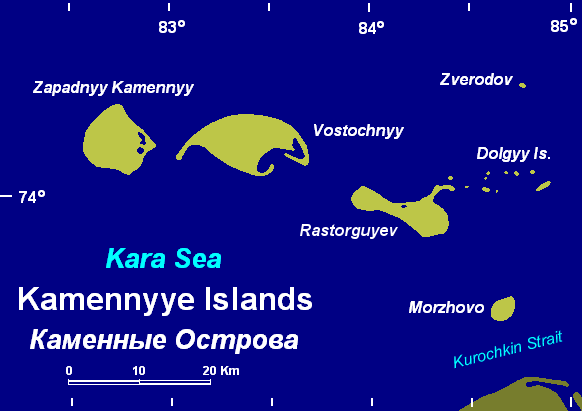
Map showing the location of Kurochkin Strait

Kurochkin Strait (Russian: Пролив Курочкина) is a 20-kilometre (12 mi) wide naviagable strait in Krasnoyarsk Krai, Russia. It is located in the Pyasina Gulf, south of the Arkticheskiy Institut Islands, and separates Morzhovo Island of the Kamennyye Islands from the mainland. The strait connects the Kara Sea in the west with Pyasina Bay in the east.

It is named after the Cossack explorer, Kondraty Kurochkin, who in 1610 led (together with Osip Shepunov) an expedition of traders from Turukhansk to the mouth of the Pyasina. It is covered with ice for most of the year.
