= Mikhail Sidorov =

Russian explorer (1823–1887)

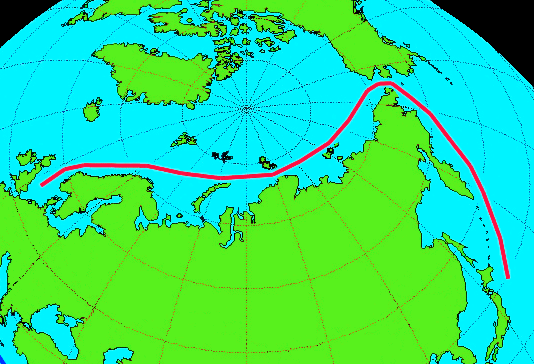
The Northern Sea Route between Europe and the Pacific

Mikhail Konstantinovich Sidorov (Russian: Михаил Константинович Сидоров) (March 16, 1823, Arkhangelsk – July 12, 1887, Aachen, both Old Style dates) was a Siberian goldmine owner. Sidorov was also pioneering entrepreneur in Russia’s Arctic who had a vision for the development of trade along the Northern Sea Route. Along with wealthy Swedish merchant and philanthropist of Scottish origin Oskar Dickson, Sidorov sponsored voyages to the Siberian North for several years.

Sidorov or Sidorova Island in the Arkticheskiy Institut group of the Kara Sea was named after him.
