= Arctic Islands =

Arctic Islands may refer to:

- Canadian Arctic islands
- Islands in the Arctic, see Category:Islands of the Arctic Ocean
- Russian Arctic islands
