= Vilda =

Vilda may refer to:

- Jorge Vilda (born 1981), Spanish football coach
- Cape Vilda, Russian Federation

== See also ==
- Den vilda (album), a 1996 album by Swedish band One More Time
- "Den vilda", a song by One More Time
