= Yacht club SMTU =

Yacht club in St. Petersburg, Russia

Coordinates: 59°58′37″N 30°13′39″E

Yachts club SMTU was an educational yacht club on Kirov Islands of St. Petersburg. It occupied the island of Bezymyanniy.

== History ==
After the creation in 1930 of the Saint Petersburg State Marine and Technological University, based on the Saint Petersburg Polytechnical University, there was a requirement for sea engineers to have training and practice opportunities. During the Second World War, students gained this practice at the Admiralty Shipyard, but towards the end of the 1940s, a new place was allocated using institute yachts, on Krestovsky island.

At the end of the 1950s, the territory of the Yacht club SMTU became an island, when a rowing canal was dug on Krestovsky island in 1958–1960. This new island was named Anonymous (Russian: Bezymyanniy), and the city administration officially placed it under the authority of the SMTU (then known as the LMTU) in 1959.

Russian: В 1959 году остров отдали в бессрочное пользование ВУЗу для занятий студентов на ялах, шлюпках, яхтах
Translated: In 1959 island have given to termless using to high school for employment of students on yawls, boats, yachts.

— Vladimir Loginov, president of Petersburg sailing union.

Club held competitions which often had no prize fund; for example winners of a Quartet - 2002 cup were awarded edible fungi. The club had access to unusual vessels, such as a trimaran, and a submarine.

The last director of the club was Jury Chistjakov, who was in charge when the club was closed in 2003. The land is now being used for the building of a new sports centre. This will belong to a noncommercial partnership Javara-Neva, and its president will be Vladimir Putin.
