= Sverdrup Island (Kara Sea) =

Russian island in the Kara Sea

Native name: Остров Свердрупа
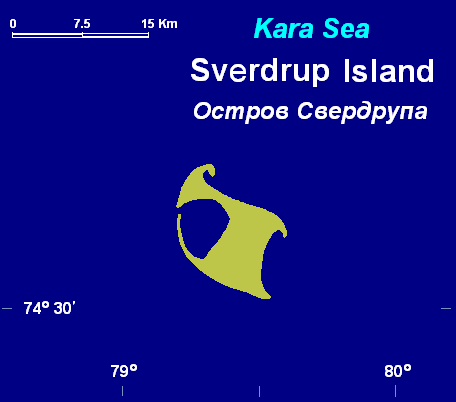

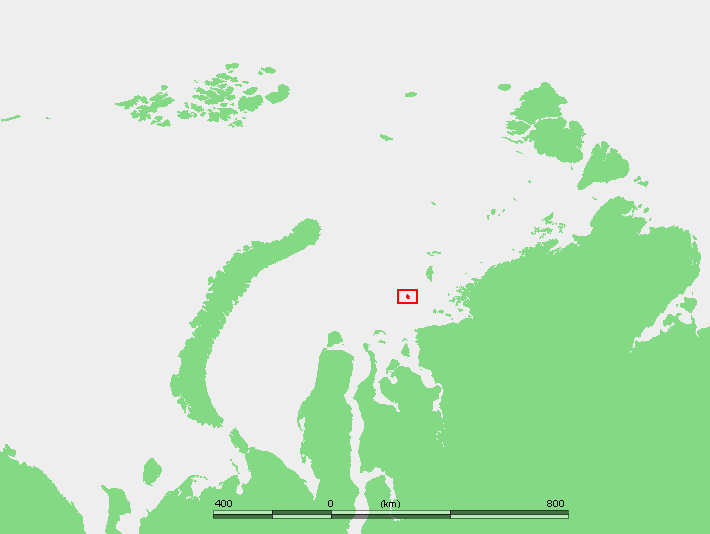
- Location of Sverdrup Island in the Kara Sea

Geography
- Location: Kara Sea
- Coordinates: 74°35′N 79°27′E
- Area: 70 km^{2} (27 sq mi)
- Length: 15 km (9.3 mi)
- Width: 10 km (6 mi)
- Highest elevation: 33 m (108 ft)

Administration
- Russia
- Krai: Krasnoyarsk Krai
- Okrug: Taymyr Autonomous Okrug

Demographics
- Population: 0

Sverdrup Island (Russian: Остров Свердрупа) is an isolated Russian island in the southern region of the Kara Sea.

Sverdrup Island is named after Norwegian polar explorer and ship Captain Otto Sverdrup who sighted it on 18 August 1893 during the Fram Expedition led by Fridtjof Nansen.

== Geography ==
It belongs to the Taymyr Autonomous Okrug of the Krasnoyarsk Krai administrative division of the Russian Federation.

The island is located 120 km north of Dikson on the Siberian coast. The nearest land mass is the Arkticheskiy Institut Islands, about 90 km to the northeast. The island has a wide bay opening towards the west. Its length is 15 km and its maximum width 10 km.

The sea surrounding Sverdrup Island is covered with pack ice with some polynias in the long winter and there are many ice floes even in the summer.

== Flora and fauna ==
Sverdrup Island is covered with tundra vegetation. There are a few mammals, such as the lemming and Arctic fox; among the birds the dunlin and some species of Charadriiformes deserve mention.

The island is part of the Great Arctic State Nature Reserve – the largest nature reserve of Russia and one of the biggest in the world.

== See also ==
- List of islands of Russia
