= Uyedineniya Island =

Island located in the central part of the Kara Sea

Uyedineniya Lonely Island Ensamheten (classical) Уединения (Russian)
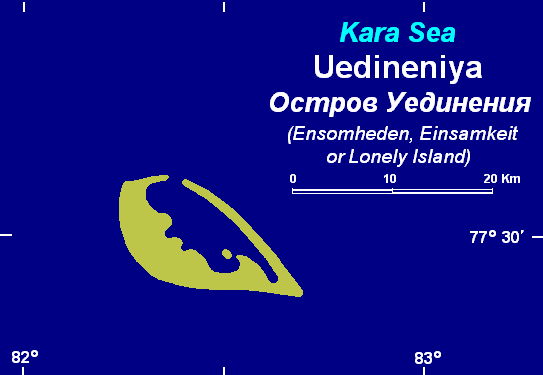
- Map of Uyedineniya

- Location within Krasnoyarsk Krai

Geography
- Location: Kara Sea, Arctic Ocean
- Coordinates: 77°29′N 82°30′E
- Area: 20 km^{2} (7.7 sq mi)
- Length: 11.5 km (7.15 mi)
- Width: 5.2 km (3.23 mi)
- Highest elevation: 30 m (100 ft)

Administration
- Russia
- Federal district: Siberian Federal District
- Federal subject: Krasnoyarsk Krai

Demographics
- Population: 0 (uninhabited)
- Pop. density: 0/km^{2} (0/sq mi)

Uyedineniya Island (also Uedinenia, Russian: Остров Уединения; Norwegian: Ensomheden) is an island located in the central part of the Kara Sea, roughly midway between Novaya Zemlya and Severnaya Zemlya. Its latitude is 77° 29' N and its longitude 82° 30' E. It is often labelled as Einsamkeit Island (from the German Insel der Einsamkeit) as well as Lonely Island or Solitude Island in English maps. It is best known from Nordenskiöld's more famous works under the title of Ensamheten.

== Geography ==
The island is barren and icy throughout the winter months, but some tundra vegetation grows on it in the summer. Its length is 18.5 kilometres (11.5 miles) and its total area is 20 square kilometres (8 square miles). Compared to other Arctic islands it is flat and low-lying, with some swamps and small lakes and a long spit of land on its NE side. Its highest point is only about 30 metres (98 feet).

Owing to its extreme northerly location the weather is bleak and severe and the sea surrounding Uedineniya is covered with pack ice in the winter. Ice floes are commonly found even in the summer.

The nearest landmasses are the Izvestiy TSIK Islands, located about 150 km to the south-southeast, while the distance to mainland Siberia to the south-southeast some 280 kilometres (174 miles) and to the northern tip of Novaya Zemlya straight west about 340 kilometres (211 miles).

Uyedineniya belongs to the Krasnoyarsk Krai administrative division of the Russian Federation.

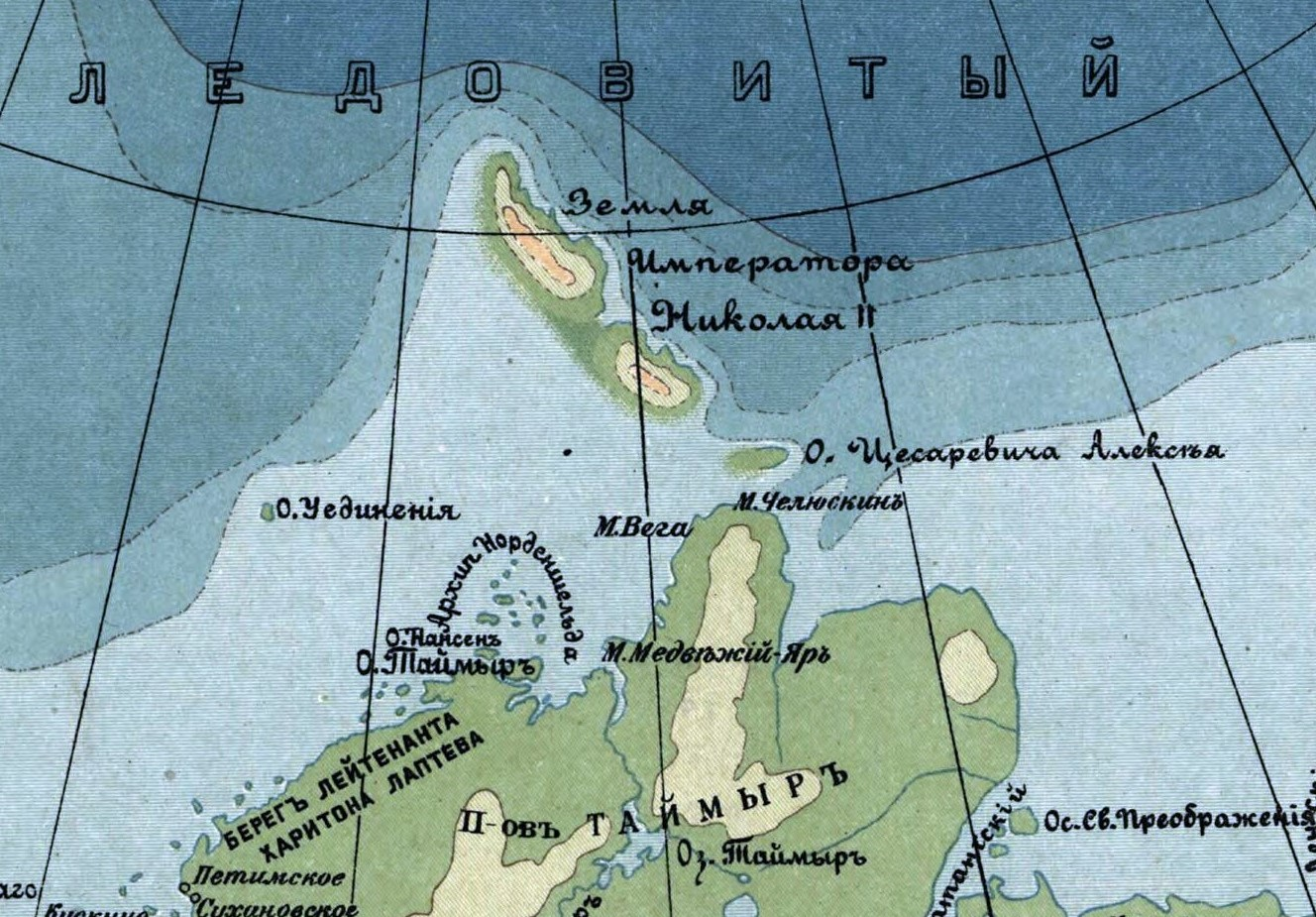
Partly surveyed Emperor Nicholas II Land in a 1915 map of the Russian Empire and Uedineniya as the only island west of it.

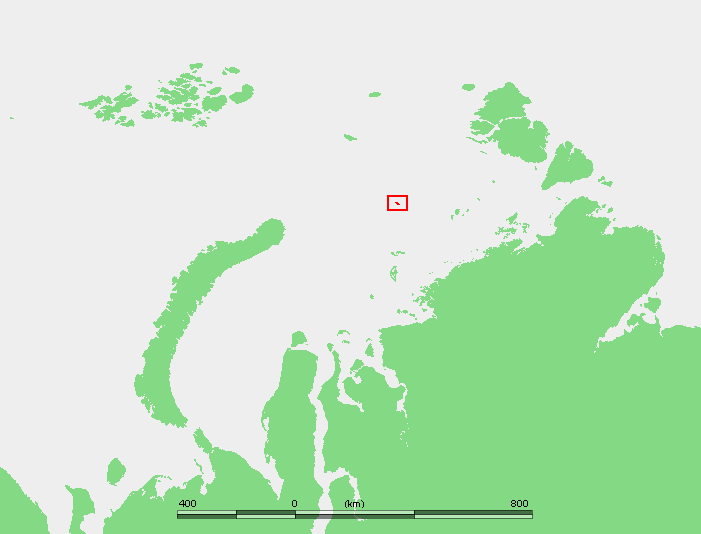
Location in the Kara Sea.

== History ==
The island was discovered on 26 August 1878 by Norwegian explorer Captain Edvard Holm Johannesen from Tromsø. He named the island Ensomheden—"solitude" in Norwegian—due to its desolate appearance and isolated location in the Arctic.

Soviet polar explorer Professor Vladimir Yulyevich Vize advanced the hypothesis that there was an extensive shallow area and perhaps more undiscovered islands near Uyedinenya. This was based on certain observations made by polar explorers:

The discovery of that solitary island called Einsamkeit, by Captain Johannesen... is of the greatest importance and significance, as indicating the presence of land hitherto unknown in that direction. Although it received the name it now bears from Captain Johannesen, a name signifying "lonely" or "solitary," it seems exceedingly unlikely that it will prove to be so isolated as is supposed... which would lead to the assumption that it might be the southern termination of a chain of islands eastward of Franz-Josef Land.

During his expedition to Franz Josef Land on ice-breaking steamer "Malygin" in 1931, Vize hoped to carry out oceanographic work in the Northern part of the Kara Sea, but his research was cut short by thick sea ice. Later expeditions and satellite pictures demonstrated that there were no other islands in the vicinity of Uedineniya.

A cervical vertebra of a plesiosaur (Plesiosaurus latispinus) was discovered on the island during an expedition in the 1930s. It was studied by Soviet paleontologist A. N. Ryabinin.

At the time of World War II, there was a small polar observatory on Uyedineniya built by the Soviet government. On September 8, 1942, the German submarine U-251 (Lt. Captain Timm) surfaced close to the island and destroyed the weather station's small building and its garrison by firing grenades against those targets. This was one of the last actions of the Kriegsmarine under Operation Wunderland.

Since May 1993, Uyedineniya has been a part of the Great Arctic State Nature Reserve, the largest nature reserve in Russia intended to preserve the habitat of the polar bears, pinnipeds (namely, walruses and seals), and the many kinds of birds that live on the island.

The polar observatory, which had been rebuilt during the Cold War time, was abandoned in 1996. Presently there is no human habitation in Uyedineniya.

== Climate ==
Uyedineniya Island has a harsh Arctic climate, mean temperatures never rise above freezing except during the two summer months.

Climate data for Uyedineniya Island
Month	Jan	Feb	Mar	Apr	May	Jun	Jul	Aug	Sep	Oct	Nov	Dec	Year
Daily mean °C (°F)	−26.7 (−16.1)	−26.6 (−15.9)	−25.5 (−13.9)	−19.4 (−2.9)	−10.1 (13.8)	−1.6 (29.1)	0.7 (33.3)	0.1 (32.2)	−2.2 (28.0)	−10.4 (13.3)	−19.9 (−3.8)	−23.2 (−9.8)	−13.7 (7.3)
Average precipitation mm (inches)	11.7 (0.46)	11.0 (0.43)	11.6 (0.46)	7.1 (0.28)	10.2 (0.40)	14.8 (0.58)	28.8 (1.13)	28.6 (1.13)	23.6 (0.93)	20.0 (0.79)	12.6 (0.50)	13.2 (0.52)	194.2 (7.65)
Average precipitation days (≥ 1.0 mm)	3.9	3.6	3.6	2.1	2.4	4.1	6.1	7.3	6.8	5.9	4.4	5.6	55.8
Mean monthly sunshine hours	0	5	140	272	178	127	161	87	31	14	0	0	1,015
Source: NOAA

== See also ==
- List of islands of Russia
- List of research stations in the Arctic

== Notes ==
=== Sources ===
- Rudolf Samoylovich, Exploration of the Polar Part of U.S.S.R. in 1934 and the Sedov expedition.
- Albert Hastings Markham. Arctic Exploration, 1895.
