= Middendorff Bay =

Bay in the shores of the Taymyr Peninsula

- Залив Миддендорфа (Russian)
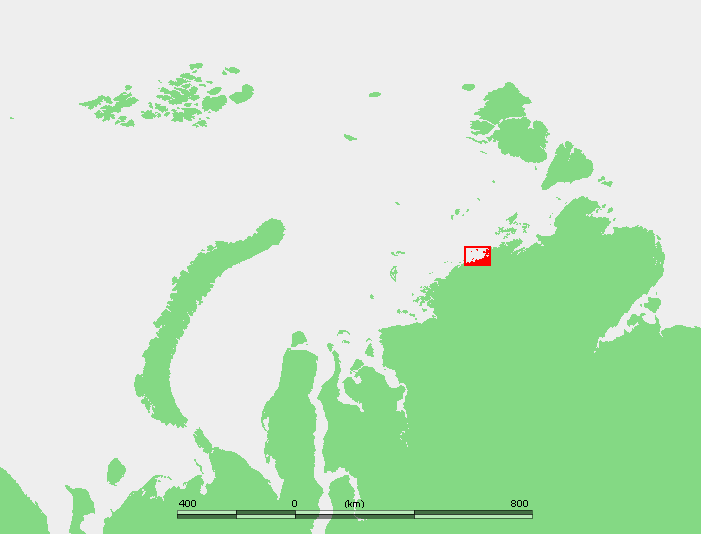
- Map showing the location of the Middendorff Bay.

- Location within Krasnoyarsk Krai
- Location: Far North
- Coordinates: 75°50′N 92°30′E
- River sources: Baydarata, Yuribey and Kara
- Ocean/sea sources: Kara Sea
- Basin countries: Russia

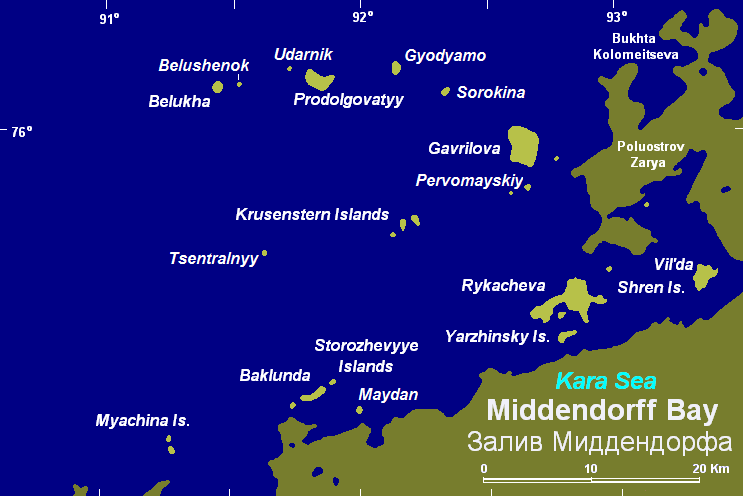
The Middendorff Bay with its numerous islands.

The Middendorff Bay, (Russian: Залив Миддендорфа) is a deeply indented bay in the shores of the Taymyr Peninsula. It is located southwest of the Nordenskiöld Archipelago in the Kara Sea and it is open towards the west.

== Geography ==
This bay is limited on its eastern side by the Zarya Peninsula, named after Baron Eduard von Toll's ship Zarya. On the northern side of the Zarya Peninsula there is a small gulf called Bukhta Kolomeitseva, named after Captain N. N. Kolomeitsev, commander of ship Zarya.

The Middendorff Bay is surrounded by bleak tundra coast. It is full of small islands and island groups, foremost of which are Gavrilova Island, the Shren Islands, the Krusenstern Islands, and farther offshore, Belukha and Prodolgovatyy Islands. The small Myachina Islands are located 3 km (1.9 mi) off Cape Vilda, further west from the bay along the coast.

The climate in the area is severe, with long and bitter winters and frequent blizzards and gales. This desolate bay is frozen for about nine months in a year and even in summer it is never quite free of ice floes.

The Middendorff Bay and adjacent islands belong to the Krasnoyarsk Krai administrative division of the Russian Federation and the whole area is part of the Great Arctic State Nature Reserve, the largest nature reserve of Russia.

== History ==
This bay was explored by Russian geologist Baron Eduard von Toll during his last venture, the Russian Arctic Expedition of 1900–1903. It was named after Alexander Theodor von Middendorff, a Russian zoologist, historian and explorer of Baltic-German origin.
