= Voronina Island =

Island group in the Kara Sea

Coordinates: 78°14′N 93°41′E

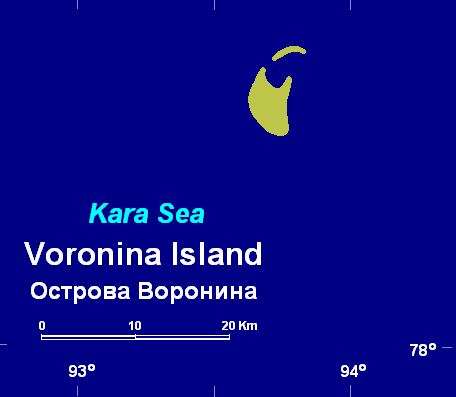

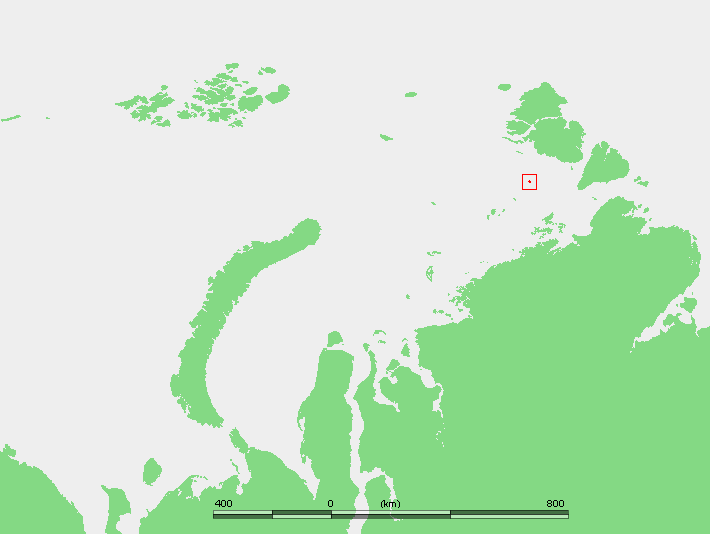
Location of Voronina in the Kara Sea.

Voronina Island or Voronina Islands (Russian: Острова Воронина, Ostrova Voronina or Остров Воронина, Ostrov Voronina) is an isolated two-island group composed of a larger island and a narrow island on its northern side separated by a 3 km wide sound.

The main Voronina Island is about 9 km long and 6 km wide and is covered with tundra vegetation and ice. The northern islet is narrow, about 5 km in length and little more than 500 metres in width. These islands are located in the northeastern regions of the Kara Sea, about 130 km west of Severnaya Zemlya's shores and 72 km NNE of Kirova Island of the Kirov group.

The sea surrounding these lonely two islands is covered with pack ice in the winter and there are numerous ice floes even in the summer, which lasts barely two months. The climate is so severe that there are years where at Voronina Island's latitude the surrounding waters of the Kara Sea don't melt and remain frozen solid through the summer.

This island group belongs to the Krasnoyarsk Krai administrative division of the Russian Federation. Voronina is also a breeding ground for polar bears and a wildlife refuge part of the Great Arctic State Nature Reserve, the largest nature reserve of the Russian Arctic.

The Voronina Islands have been named after Soviet Navy Captain Vladimir Voronin. Since "Voronina" is a Russian genitive, the combination "Voronina Islands" is technically incorrect. Even so, the name "Voronina Island" (or "Islands") has become popular and its use has been widespread in this manner for many decades and in many modern maps and atlases. "Voronin Islands", which would be the grammatically correct way of naming these islands in English, is very rarely used.

== See also ==
- Kara Sea
