= Vladimir Wiese =

Russian scientist (1886–1954)

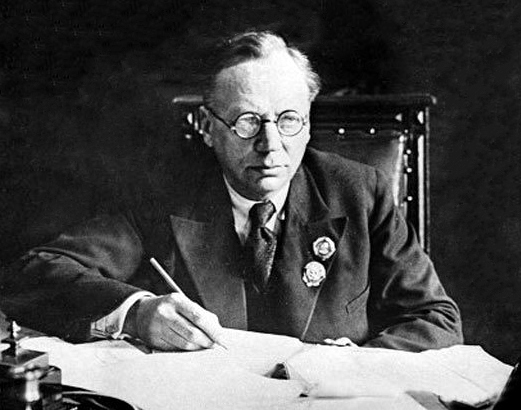
- Wiese c. 1930
- Born: Vladimir Yulyevich Wiese; 5 March 1886; Tsarskoe Selo, Russia
- Died: 19 February 1954 (aged 67); Leningrad, Soviet Union
- Education: Saint Petersburg University; University of Göttingen
- Known for: Wiese Island
- Scientific career
- Workplaces: Saint Petersburg University

Vladimir Yulyevich Wiese (Russian: Владимир Юльевич Визе; 5 March 1886 – 19 February 1954) was a Russian scientist of German descent who devoted his life to the study of the Arctic ice pack. His name is associated with the Scientific Prediction of Ice Conditions theory. Wiese was a member of the Soviet Arctic Institute and an authority on polar oceanography. He was also the founder of the Geographico-hydrological School of Oceanography.

== Biography ==
Wiese was born to German immigrants to Saint Petersburg, Julius Friedrich Franz Wiese and Lydia Karoline Amalie Gertrud Blass. He graduated from the Saint Petersburg University and the University of Göttingen.

== Arctic expeditions ==
In 1912–14 Wiese went with Georgy Sedov’s expedition on the ship St. Foka to Novaya Zemlya and Franz Josef Land. After the Russian Revolution Wiese took part in a number of Soviet Arctic expeditions.

In 1924 Wiese studied the drift of Georgy Brusilov's ill-fated Russian ship St. Anna when she was trapped on the pack ice of the Kara Sea. He detected an odd deviation of the path of the ship's drift caused by certain variations of the patterns of sea and ice currents. He concluded that the deviation was caused by the presence of an undiscovered island, whose coordinates he could accurately calculate thanks to the availability of the successive positions of the St. Anna during its drift. The island was later named after Wiese.

Finally the island was discovered on 13 August 1930 by a Soviet expedition led by Otto Schmidt aboard the icebreaker Sedov under Captain Vladimir Voronin. The island was named Wiese Island, who was at the time aboard the Sedov.

In July 1931 Wiese led an expedition on icebreaking steamer Malygin to Franz Josef Land and the northern part of the Kara Sea. He carried out meteorological, electromagnetic and hydrological observations during this expedition. During this expedition German airship Graf Zeppelin made a rendezvous with icebreaker Malygin at Bukhta Tikhaya in Hooker Island, Franz Josef Land.

At Rudolf Island Wiese recovered artifacts from the abandoned huts of the 1904–1905 Ziegler Polar Expedition to Franz Josef Land. His intention was to carry out deep-sea oceanographic research in the Arctic basin, but due to fog and bad weather he reluctantly gave up and the expedition headed south. He had also hoped to carry out oceanographic research in the then little-explored northern part of the Kara Sea, but the ice concentrations became progressively heavier until it was decided to turn back. In this Arctic expedition Wiese's scientific zeal was tempered by Captain Chertkhov's prudent decisions. Even so, the expedition was quite successful. Surface water temperatures were taken at 295 locations, water samples were taken from 273 stations, and meteorological observations were duly taken every four hours.

Earlier in 1929 Wiese proposed setting up a drifting polar observatory near the North Pole. His proposal was accepted only in 1935, resulting in the North Pole-1 expedition. Wiese took part in its preparation, but could not participate due to declining health. He went into his final expedition in 1937, on icebreaker Sadko. Its goal was to sail to Henrietta, Zhokhov and Jeannette Islands, in the De Long group and carry out scientific research. The purpose of the expedition was also to find out how could the Northern Sea Route be used for regular shipping. But the Soviet naval authorities changed the plans and the ice-breaker was sent instead to help ships in distress in the Kara and Laptev Seas. Sadko itself became trapped in fast ice at 75°17'N and 132°28'E near New Siberian Islands. Two other Soviet icebreakers that researched the ice condition in the same area, Sedov and Malygin, also became trapped by sea ice and drifted helplessly. Owing to persistent bad weather conditions, part of the stranded crew members and some of the scientists could only be rescued in April 1938. On 28 August 1938, icebreaker Yermak freed two of the three ships at 83°4'N and 138°22'E. The third ship, Sedov, would remain in the ice to begin an 812-day drift during which the one remaining junior scientist supervised hundreds of astronomical, electromagnetic and depth measurements before they were finally freed between Greenland and Svalbard by the icebreaker Joseph Stalin on 18 January 1940. The crew and scientists were welcomed back in the Soviet Union as heroes.

== Personal life ==
Wife - Olga Wiese (nee Balabina) (1902-1983). Vladimir Yulievich had two daughters, Olga and Tatyana. The descendants of Vladimir Yulievich live in Germany, as well as in Estonia, in the city of Narva.

== Awards and honors ==
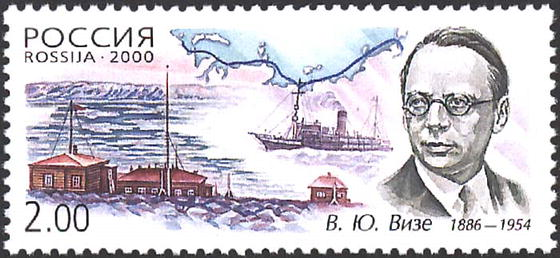
Wiese on a 2000 Russian stamp

In 1933 Wiese was elected as a corresponding member of the Soviet Academy of Sciences. He was awarded two Orders of Lenin and a Stalin Prize (1946). Several geographical objects in the Soviet Arctic bear his name, including the Wiese Island.

== Scientific works ==
- Morya Sovetskoy Arktiki. (Russian) Moscow-Leningrad 1948
- The expedition on board the icebreaking steamer “Malygin” to Zemlya Frantsa Iosifa. 1933 (transl. from Russian)
- The voyage of the icebreaker “Malygin” to Zemlya Frantsa Iosifa in 1931. Trudy (transl. from Russian)
- "Die Vorhersage der Eisverhältnisse im Barentsmeer". Arktis I. 1928 (German).

== See also ==
- Sea ice
- Drifting ice station
- Uyedineniya Island
- Fyodor Litke (1909 icebreaker)
- Nikolai Pinegin
