= Cape Vilda =

Headland in the Kara Sea, Krasnoyarsk Krai, Russian Federation

Cape Vilda Мыс Вильда
- Cape
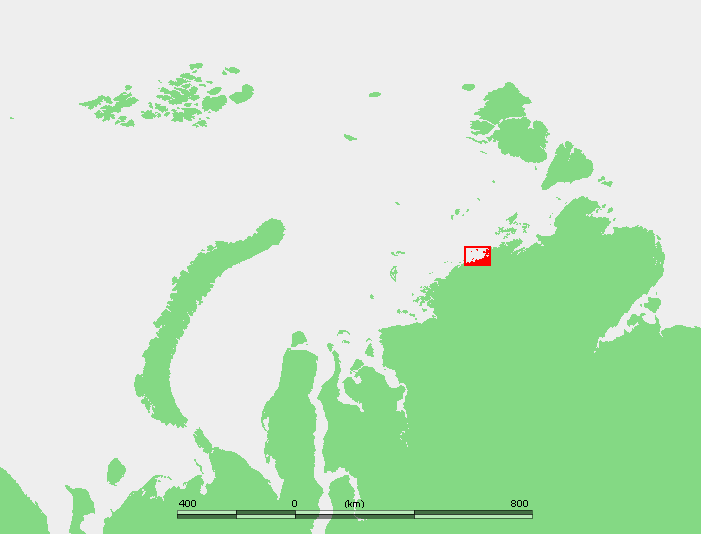
- Location of Cape Vilda

- Coordinates: 75°40′17″N 91°15′25″E
- Location: Krasnoyarsk Krai, Russia
- Offshore water bodies: Kara Sea

Area
  - Total: Russian Far North

Cape Vilda (Russian: Мыс Вильда) is a headland in the Kara Sea, Krasnoyarsk Krai, Russian Federation. This cape is located on the western shore of the Taymyr Peninsula, at the western end of Middendorff Bay.

The Myachina Islands, a group of two small islets, lie 3 km north of Cape Vilda.

== History ==
In 1921 Nikifor Begichev led a Soviet expedition in search for Roald Amundsen's 1919 Arctic expedition's crew members Peter Tessem and Paul Knutsen on request of the government of Norway. Checking the remains of campfires, Begichev was able to establish that Amundsen's men had passed Cape Vilda, more than halfway down their journey, and that at that point all was well. Captain Jakobsen, a Norwegian who went with Begichev, found later an abandoned sledge 90 km west of Mys Vil’da, indicating that something had gone wrong with his two ill-fated compatriots.
