= Ushakov Island =

Island in Russia

Native name: Russian: Остров Ушакова (Ostrov Ushakova)
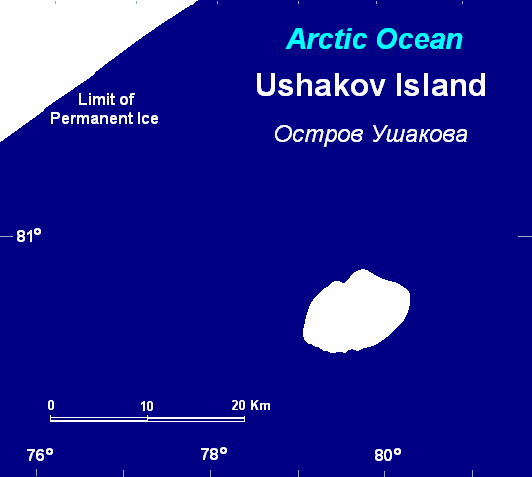
- Ushakov Island is practically covered with ice and snow the whole year round

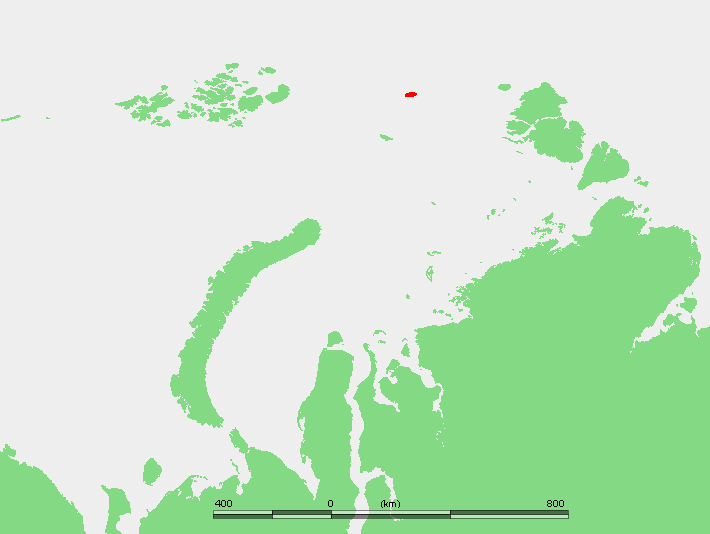

- Location within Arctic

Geography
- Location: Arctic Ocean (Kara Sea)
- Coordinates: 80°48′N 79°29′E
- Total islands: 1
- Major islands: Ushakov
- Area: 324 km^{2} (125 sq mi)
- Length: 25.5 km (15.84 mi)
- Width: 17.5 km (10.87 mi)
- Highest elevation: 294 m (965 ft)
- Highest point: Ice cap HP

Administration
- Russia
- Federal district: Siberian Federal District
- Federal subject: Krasnoyarsk Krai
- District: Taymyrsky Dolgano-Nenetsky

Demographics
- Population: 0 (2026)
- Pop. density: 0/km^{2} (0/sq mi)
- Ethnic groups: N/A

Ushakov Island (Russian: Остров Ушакова, Ostrov Ushakova) is an isolated, uninhabited island located in the Arctic Ocean, within the northern Kara Sea. It lies approximately midway between the archipelagos of Franz Josef Land and Severnaya Zemlya. The island is notable for being almost entirely covered by a glacial ice cap and was the last major landmass to be discovered within the territory of the former Soviet Union.

== Geography ==
Ushakov Island is situated at the northern limit of the Kara Sea, close to the region of permanent sea ice. Its total area is approximately 324 square kilometres (125 square miles). The island measures about 25.5 kilometres (16 miles) in length and 17.5 kilometres (11 miles) in width. The closest landmass is Vize Island, located approximately 140 kilometres (87 miles) to the south. Owing to its extreme northerly location, the surrounding sea is covered with pack ice in winter and remains full of ice floes even during the brief summer. The island is subject to severe Arctic storms.

Administratively, Ushakov Island belongs to the Taymyrsky Dolgano-Nenetsky District of Krasnoyarsk Krai, Russia.

=== Ice cap ===
Ushakov Island is almost entirely covered by an ice cap, with the underlying rocky ground flat and partially situated below sea level. The ice cap has a dome-like shape, and its highest point reaches an elevation of 294 metres (965 feet). In the center of the dome, the ice thickness reaches up to 250 metres (820 feet), gradually thinning towards the periphery. The edges of the ice cap terminate in steep icy cliffs along the shoreline, typically ranging from 20 metres (66 feet) to 30 metres (98 feet) in height. No bedrock is exposed anywhere on the island.

Between 1950 and 2000, the surface area of the ice cap decreased by approximately 2 square kilometres (1 square mile), but its total ice volume increased from 35 cubic kilometres (8 cubic miles) to 38 cubic kilometres (9 cubic miles) due to thickening in the higher elevations. The average ice thickness increased from 107 metres (351 feet) to 118 metres (387 feet) during this period.

The average yearly precipitation ranges from 200 millimetres (8 inches) at an elevation of 50 metres (164 feet) to between 350 millimetres (14 inches) and 400 millimetres (16 inches) around the highest point of the ice cap.

=== Climate ===
Ushakov Island has an ice cap climate (Köppen EF), bordering on a tundra climate (ET), owing to its location at 81°N and approximately 20 miles from the limit of permanent sea ice. Summers are very cold and dry, while winters are extremely frigid and virtually without precipitation. The island experiences no more than 20–30 days with positive air temperatures annually, and is characterized by high relative humidity, frequent fogs, and overcast weather.

Climate data for Ushakov Island (1981-2010 normals, extremes 1973-2020)
Month	Jan	Feb	Mar	Apr	May	Jun	Jul	Aug	Sep	Oct	Nov	Dec	Year
Record high °C (°F)	−2.4 (27.7)	−0.8 (30.6)	−0.8 (30.6)	0.3 (32.5)	2.0 (35.6)	4.0 (39.2)	5.0 (41.0)	5.2 (41.4)	3.7 (38.7)	0.8 (33.4)	−1.0 (30.2)	−2.0 (28.4)	5.2 (41.4)
Mean daily maximum °C (°F)	−23.1 (−9.6)	−23.6 (−10.5)	−24.1 (−11.4)	−18.9 (−2.0)	−8.7 (16.3)	−1.0 (30.2)	0.6 (33.1)	0.0 (32.0)	−3.6 (25.5)	−10.8 (12.6)	−19.2 (−2.6)	−23.4 (−10.1)	−13.2 (8.2)
Daily mean °C (°F)	−26.2 (−15.2)	−26.4 (−15.5)	−26.8 (−16.2)	−21.6 (−6.9)	−10.6 (12.9)	−2.2 (28.0)	−0.3 (31.5)	−1.1 (30.0)	−5.4 (22.3)	−13.5 (7.7)	−21.9 (−7.4)	−26.1 (−15.0)	−15.4 (4.3)
Mean daily minimum °C (°F)	−29.2 (−20.6)	−29.1 (−20.4)	−29.5 (−21.1)	−24.3 (−11.7)	−12.4 (9.7)	−3.4 (25.9)	−1.1 (30.0)	−2.2 (28.0)	−7.1 (19.2)	−16.1 (3.0)	−24.6 (−12.3)	−28.8 (−19.8)	−17.6 (0.3)
Record low °C (°F)	−43.1 (−45.6)	−47.0 (−52.6)	−43.5 (−46.3)	−42.2 (−44.0)	−24.6 (−12.3)	−13.3 (8.1)	−7.3 (18.9)	−12.0 (10.4)	−25.0 (−13.0)	−37.0 (−34.6)	−37.0 (−34.6)	−44.7 (−48.5)	−47.0 (−52.6)
Average precipitation mm (inches)	5.9 (0.23)	3.1 (0.12)	4.9 (0.19)	9.7 (0.38)	7.6 (0.30)	4.7 (0.19)	22.8 (0.90)	17.3 (0.68)	8.3 (0.33)	18.3 (0.72)	3.7 (0.15)	2.5 (0.10)	107.4 (4.23)
Average precipitation days (≥ 1 mm)	1.36	0.77	1.44	1.60	2.25	1.46	1.56	2.45	2.69	2.46	1.26	0.51	19.60
Source 1: Météo climat stats
Source 2: Météo Climat and Pogoda.ru.net

== History ==
Ushakov Island was the last major piece of undiscovered territory in the Soviet Arctic. The island was finally discovered on September 1, 1935, during the First Soviet High-latitude Expedition led by polar explorer and cartographer Georgiy Alekseevich Ushakov aboard the icebreaker Sadko. The expedition was tasked with exploring the last uncharted areas of the northern Kara Sea, and Ushakov Island was subsequently named in his honor.

The first wintering on the island was undertaken in 1954–55, and a hydrometeorological polar station was established in 1954. The station, which supported a small team of scientists (typically a chief, mechanic, radio operator, and meteorologist), was one of the most remote and inaccessible in the Soviet Arctic network. It conducted weather observations, ice monitoring, and glaciological research. In 1968, radar sounding of the ice cover was performed. The station operated until the end of the 1980s and was officially closed in 1992 following the dissolution of the Soviet Union.

In 2001, a polar radio expedition ("Lost Islands") visited the island and found the abandoned station's buildings partially submerged in the ice, with only one or two structures still visible above the surface. By 2018, the entire station complex had calved into the sea along with a portion of the glacier. A 2019 expedition confirmed that only a pile of rusty barrels remained at the glacier's edge.

=== Recent exploration ===
In September–October 2023, a joint expedition of the Russian Geographical Society (RGS) and the Russian Defense Ministry aboard the hydrographic vessel Romuald Muklevich conducted surveys around Ushakov Island. The expedition discovered a previously uncharted fjord extending approximately one kilometer into the heart of the island's ice dome. The fjord, populated by a haul-out of walruses, was described by expedition member Leonid Kruglov as "very beautiful." The survey also revealed that the glacier's perimeter had retreated by about half a kilometer, exposing new sea areas with depths of 15–17 metres (49–56 feet) in locations previously marked as part of the ice cap.

== Environmental changes ==
Ushakov Island has become a notable case study for climate change impacts in the High Arctic. For much of the 20th century, the island's ice cap maintained a near-equilibrium state, with a slightly negative mass balance of up to 1% volume loss annually and a short ice-free period protected by fast ice. Since the beginning of the 21st century, however, rising air temperatures and reduced sea ice extent have led to increased wave action during the warm season. As a result, the edges of the ice dome have begun to calve into the sea at an accelerating rate.

According to a 2022 study published in Doklady Earth Sciences, the average annual shoreline retreat rate increased from 10.9 metres (36 feet) per year (1954–2011) to 27.8 metres (91 feet) per year (2011–2019). The total area of the island decreased by approximately 230.8 hectares (570 acres) per year between 2002 and 2019, with losses accelerating to 294 hectares (730 acres) per year between 2015 and 2019. The glacier surface around the former polar station site decreased by 15 metres (49 feet) over 65 years. The polar station, built in 1954 approximately 800 metres (2,600 feet) from the glacier's edge, was completely washed away into the sea in 2018. The morphology of the ice shores has also changed dramatically, transitioning from low ice barriers up to 3 metres (9.8 feet) high to ice walls exceeding 45 metres (148 feet) in height. It is also plausible to assume that the island's climate has since moved out of the EF or 'Ice cap climate' category and into the ET or 'Tundra climate category', since it would only have had to increase by a mere 0,3 degrees centigrade in its average july temperature from the 1981-2010 normals for such a climatic transition to have occurred.

== Ecology ==
The extreme isolation and harsh climate of Ushakov Island support a very limited ecosystem. There is no vegetation on the island itself, as it is entirely covered by ice and snow year-round. The surrounding waters, however, provide habitat for marine mammals, including polar bears (Ursus maritimus), walruses (Odobenus rosmarus), and various species of seals. A small colony of kittiwakes and ivory gulls was observed nesting on the abandoned structures of the polar station; this colony disappeared along with the station when it calved into the sea in 2018.

== See also ==
- List of islands of Russia
- List of glaciers in Russia
