= Izvestiy TSIK Islands =

Island group in the Kara Sea, Russian Federation

Russian: Острова Известий ЦИК
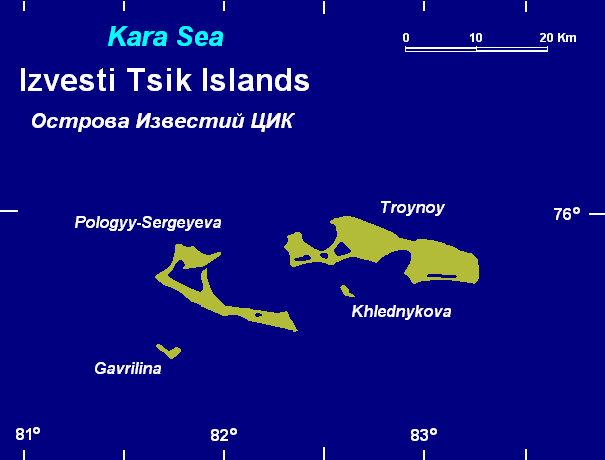

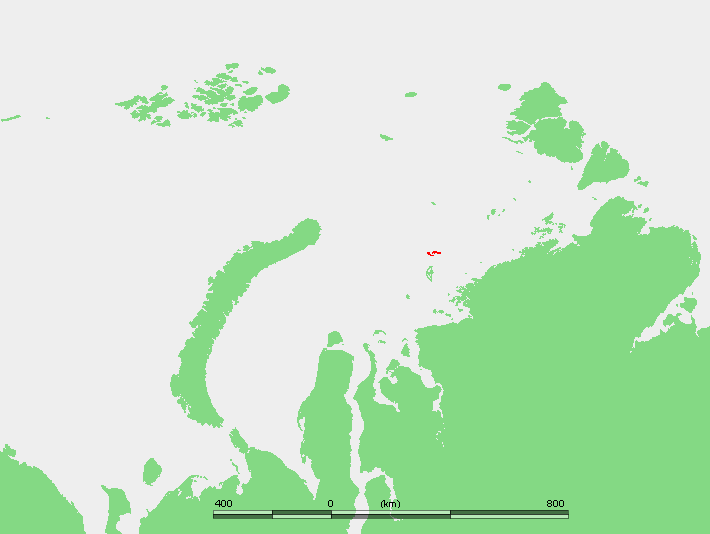
- Location of the Izvestiy Tsik Islands in the Kara Sea

Geography
- Location: Kara Sea
- Coordinates: 75°58′N 82°21′E
- Total islands: 4
- Major islands: Troynoy
- Area: 200 km^{2} (77 sq mi)
- Highest elevation: 42 m (138 ft)

Administration
- Russia

Demographics
- Population: 0

The Izvestiy TSIK Islands or Izvesti Tsik Islands (Russian: Острова Известий ЦИК), also known as Izvestia Islands, is an island group in the Kara Sea, Russian Federation.

== Geography ==
The archipelago includes two large and two small islands covered with tundra vegetation, shingle and ice. It is located in the Kara Sea, about 150 km from the coast of Siberia and just 45 km north of the nearest island group, the Arkticheskiy Institut Islands. The largest island is Troynoy with a length of 27 km. The sea surrounding the Izvesti Tsik Islands is covered with pack ice in the winter and there are numerous ice floes even in the summer. The strait between Pologyy-Sergeyeva and Gavrilina Island is known as Proliv Belukha. The wholly submerged Sadko Shoal (Russian: Банка Садко;Banka Sadko) is located roughly 30 km to the NE of Tupoy Point, Troynoy Island's easternmost headland.

== Environment ==
This island group belongs to the Krasnoyarsk Krai administrative division of Russia and is part of the Great Arctic State Nature Reserve, the largest nature reserve of Russia.

=== Birds ===
The islands are a breeding ground for migratory birds during the brief summer season. They regularly support significant populations of brent geese, king eiders, ruddy turnstones, sanderlings, ivory and glaucous gulls, arctic terns, long-tailed and arctic jaegers, and snow buntings. The archipelago has been recognised as an Important Bird Area (IBA) by BirdLife International.

== History ==
These islands were named after Izvestiya Tsentral'nogo Ispolnitel'nogo Komiteta, which was the full title of the newspaper Izvestia. A topographic survey of the islands was conducted in 1939.

There is a scientific station (Polyarnaya Stantsiya) on Troynoy Island that was founded in 1953. In September 2016 the weather station was encircled by about 10 adult polar bears as well as cubs, making it dangerous for scientists to exit. A nearby ship was able to deliver dogs and flares to the island, allowing the scientists, who had been trapped for two weeks, to scare off the bears.

== See also ==
- List of islands of Russia
- List of research stations in the Arctic
- Sadko (icebreaker)
