= Wiese Island =

Isolated Russian island located in the Arctic Ocean

Russian: Остров Визе
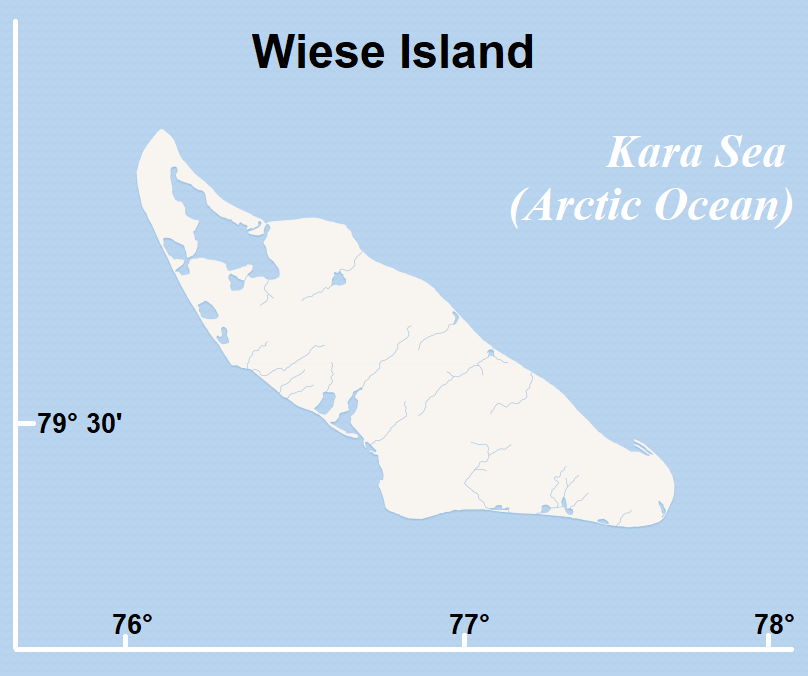

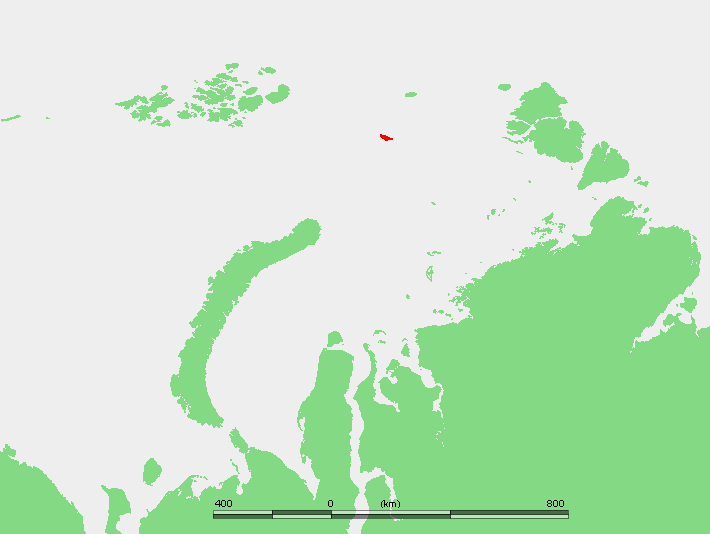
- Location of Wiese Island in the Kara Sea

Geography
- Location: Arctic Ocean
- Coordinates: 79°32′59″N 76°51′40″E
- Area: 288 km^{2} (111 sq mi)
- Length: 34 km (21.1 mi)
- Width: 11 km (6.8 mi)
- Highest elevation: 22 m (72 ft)

Administration
- Russia

Demographics
- Population: 0

Wiese Island, or Vize Island (Russian: Остров Визе Ostrov Vize), also known as Zemlya Vize (Russian: Земля Визе) is an isolated Russian island located in the Arctic Ocean, named after Soviet oceanographer of German-descent Vladimir Wiese.

== Geography ==
This island is desolate and subject to severe Arctic storms, but it has no glaciers. In the summer, large areas of the island are free of ice and snow. Its total area is 288 km^{2} (111 sq mi). Compared to other Arctic islands it is relatively large and flat, its highest point being only 22 m (72 ft) above mean sea level. The closest land is Ushakov Island 140 km (87 mi) further north.

Wiese Island lies at the northern end of the Kara Sea, roughly midway between Franz Josef Land and Severnaya Zemlya. It belongs to the Taymyrsky Dolgano-Nenetsky District of the Krasnoyarsk Krai administrative division of Russia. Owing to its extreme northerly location, the surrounding sea is covered with pack ice in the winter, and it is quite full of ice floes even in the summer.

The island's coastline is also receding at a very fast rate, due to erosion. Between 2009 and 2016, its coastline is reported to have receded by up to 74 metres (243 ft), making it one of the fastest receding islands in the world.

== History ==
In 1924, oceanographer Vladimir Wiese studied the drift of Georgy Brusilov's ill-fated Russian ship Svyataya Anna when she was trapped on the pack ice of the Kara Sea. Wiese detected an odd deviation of the path of the ship's drift caused by certain variations of the patterns of sea and ice currents. He deemed that the deviation was caused by the presence of an undiscovered island whose coordinates he was able to calculate with precision thanks to the availability of the successive positions of the St. Anna during its drift. The data of the drift had been supplied by navigator Valerian Albanov, one of the only two survivors of the St. Anna.

Finally, the island was discovered on 13 August 1930 by a Soviet expedition led by Otto Schmidt aboard the Icebreaker Sedov under Captain Vladimir Voronin. The island was named after Professor Wiese of the Soviet Arctic Institute who was at the time aboard the Sedov and who was able to set foot on the island whose existence he had predicted.

The first wintering in Wiese Island took place in 1945–46. A hydrometeorological polar station was established on 1 November 1945. Wiese Island's polar station is one of the northernmost in the world.

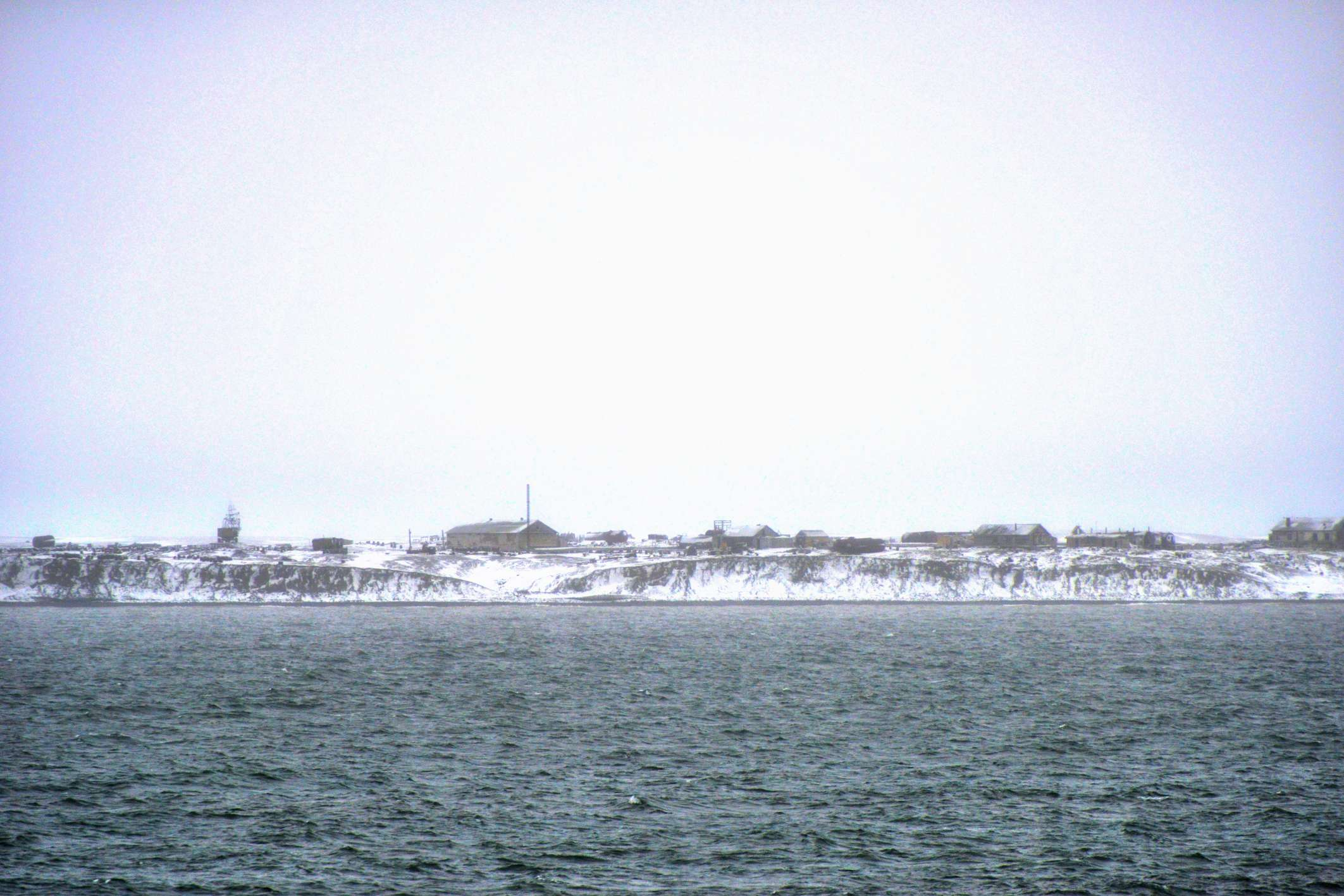
View of the Arctic research station on Vize Island

== Climate ==
Wiese Island has an extreme Arctic climate, with temperatures only able to struggle above freezing slightly for a couple of months a year and temperatures are regularly below −20 °C from November all the way through to the following April.

Since records begin in 1945 Wiese Island has not recorded a temperature at or above 10 °C (50 °F) until August 20, 2025 when the high temperature reached 11.6 °C (52.9 °F).

Climate data for Vize Island
Month	Jan	Feb	Mar	Apr	May	Jun	Jul	Aug	Sep	Oct	Nov	Dec	Year
Record high °C (°F)	0.0 (32.0)	−0.2 (31.6)	0.9 (33.6)	1.5 (34.7)	2.3 (36.1)	5.1 (41.2)	9.2 (48.6)	11.6 (52.9)	6.6 (43.9)	3.1 (37.6)	1.0 (33.8)	0.2 (32.4)	11.6 (52.9)
Mean daily maximum °C (°F)	−19.4 (−2.9)	−20.0 (−4.0)	−19.0 (−2.2)	−14.2 (6.4)	−6.4 (20.5)	−0.1 (31.8)	1.9 (35.4)	1.9 (35.4)	−0.2 (31.6)	−6.0 (21.2)	−12.0 (10.4)	−16.9 (1.6)	−9.2 (15.4)
Daily mean °C (°F)	−22.8 (−9.0)	−23.4 (−10.1)	−22.5 (−8.5)	−17.6 (0.3)	−8.6 (16.5)	−1.4 (29.5)	0.7 (33.3)	0.7 (33.3)	−1.5 (29.3)	−8.1 (17.4)	−15.1 (4.8)	−20.0 (−4.0)	−11.6 (11.1)
Mean daily minimum °C (°F)	−26.1 (−15.0)	−26.6 (−15.9)	−25.7 (−14.3)	−20.8 (−5.4)	−10.8 (12.6)	−2.7 (27.1)	−0.4 (31.3)	−0.4 (31.3)	−2.8 (27.0)	−10.5 (13.1)	−18.2 (−0.8)	−23.1 (−9.6)	−14.0 (6.8)
Record low °C (°F)	−47.9 (−54.2)	−44.5 (−48.1)	−47.0 (−52.6)	−44.0 (−47.2)	−32.1 (−25.8)	−15.0 (5.0)	−5.1 (22.8)	−11.3 (11.7)	−22.2 (−8.0)	−38.2 (−36.8)	−41.3 (−42.3)	−43.7 (−46.7)	−47.9 (−54.2)
Average precipitation mm (inches)	12 (0.5)	11 (0.4)	12 (0.5)	12 (0.5)	14 (0.6)	16 (0.6)	18 (0.7)	24 (0.9)	26 (1.0)	25 (1.0)	18 (0.7)	17 (0.7)	205 (8.1)
Average rainy days	0	0	0	0	0.3	4	12	12	6	1	0	0	35
Average snowy days	18	16	16	15	24	18	10	12	21	24	19	17	210
Average relative humidity (%)	81	80	80	83	87	91	94	94	91	85	83	81	86
Mean monthly sunshine hours	0	3	101	273	175	128	124	75	26	9	0	0	914
Source 1: Pogoda.ru.net
Source 2: NOAA (sun 1961–1990)

== See also ==
- List of islands of Russia
- List of research stations in the Arctic

== Select bibliography ==
- Summary of the Arctic archipelagos and islands. Scott Polar Research Institute, University of Cambridge.
