= Sadko (icebreaker) =

Sadko may refer to one of the following icebreakers named after Sadko, a hero of a Russian bylina:

- Sadko (1913), a Russian and later Soviet icebreaker which sank in 1941
- Sadko (1968), a Soviet and later Russian Navy armed patrol icebreaker
