= Pyasina Bay =

Bay at the mouth of the river Pyasina in the Kara Sea

Coordinates: 74°00′N 86°00′E

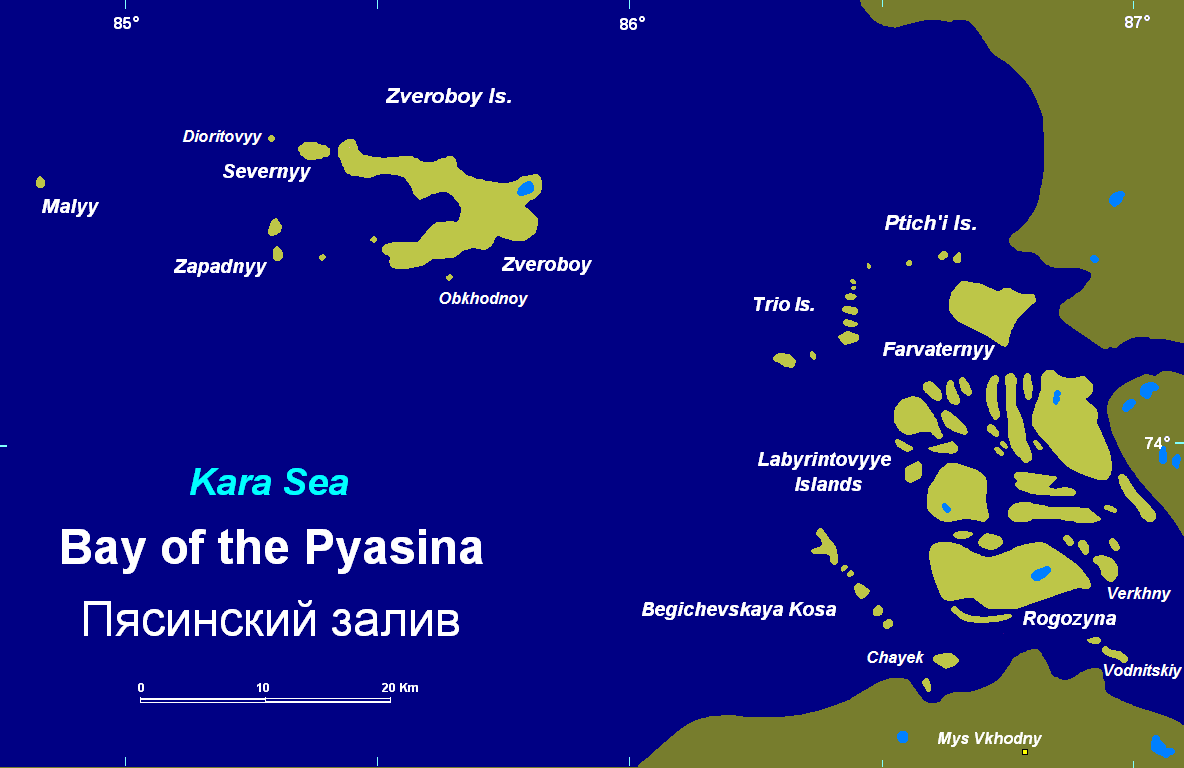
The gulf of the Pyasina with its numerous islands.

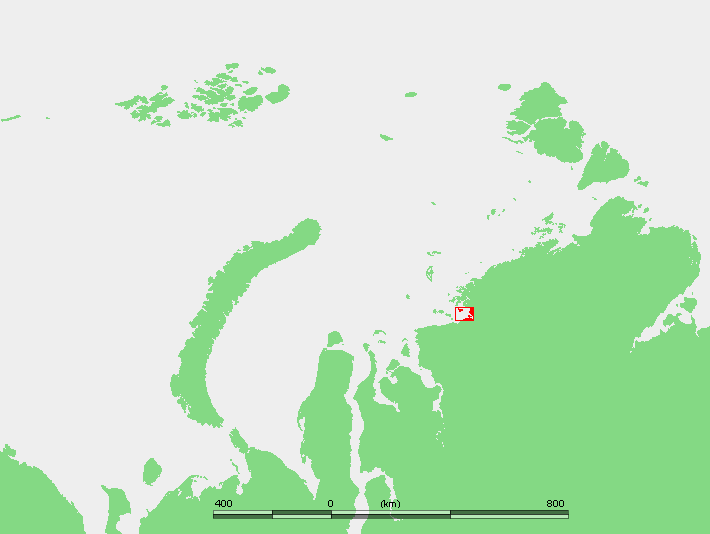
Location of the Pyasina Bay in the Kara Sea coast.

The Pyasina Bay, also known as Pyasina Gulf, (Russian: Пясинский залив; Pyasinsky Zaliv) is a bay at the mouth of the river Pyasina in the Kara Sea. It is limited on its western side by the Kamennyye Islands and on its northeastern side by the Minina Skerries.

The Pyasina Bay is surrounded by tundra coast. It is full of islands and island groups, foremost of which are the Zveroboy group (Zapadnyy, Malyy, Severnyy), the small Trio Island group and the Ptich'i Islands, the Labyrintovyye Islands, right at the large mouth of the river, the Begichevskaya Kosa string of islands and Farvaternyy Island.

The climate in the area is severe, with long and bitter winters and frequent blizzards and gales. The bay is frozen for about nine months in a year and even in summer it is never quite free of ice floes.

The Pyasina Bay was explored by Baron Eduard von Toll during his last venture, the Russian Arctic Expedition of 1900–1903.
