= Great Arctic State Nature Reserve =

Nature reserve in Krasnoyarsk Krai, Russia

- Большой Арктический государственный природный заповедник
- IUCN category Ia (strict nature reserve)
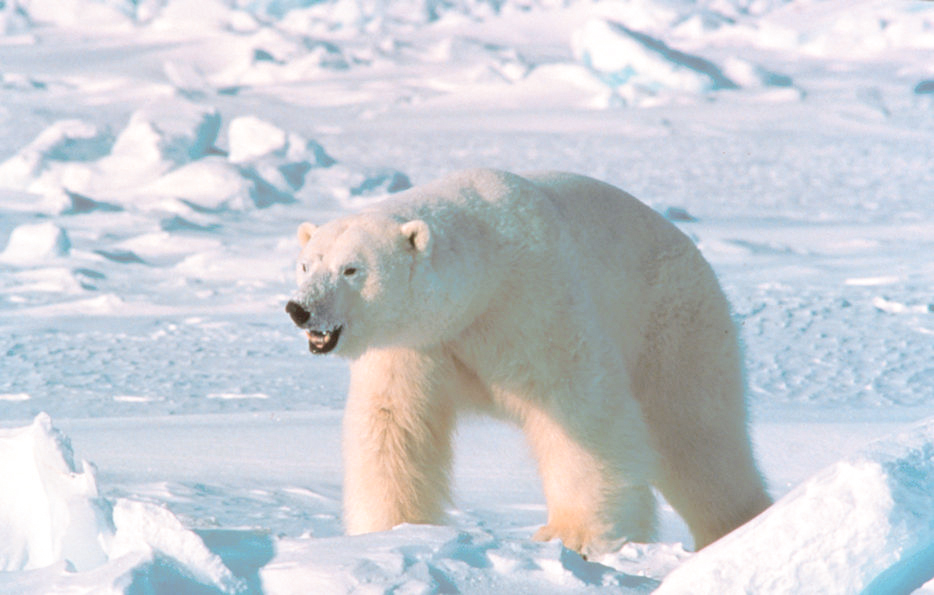
- The Great Arctic Nature Reserve is one of the largest wildernesses on earth

- Location within Russia
- Location: Russian Arctic, Krasnoyarsk Krai and Taymyrsky Dolgano-Nenetsky District
- Coordinates: 75°30′N 92°36′E
- Area: 41,692 km^{2} (16,097 sq mi)
- Established: 1993

The Great Arctic State Nature Reserve (Russian: Большой Арктический государственный природный заповедник) is a nature reserve in Krasnoyarsk Krai, Russia. With an area of 41,692 square kilometers (16,097 sq mi), it is the largest reserve of Russia and Eurasia, as well as one of the largest in the world.

== History ==
The Great Arctic State Nature Reserve was founded on May 11, 1993 by Resolution No.431 of the Government of the Russian Federation. The Nature Reserves in Russia are known as zapovedniks.

== Topography ==
The Great Arctic State Nature Reserve is divided into nine sections:

- Dikson - Sibiryakov section.
- The Kara Sea Islands section, with a surface of 4,000 square kilometers (1,500 sq mi). It includes the Sergei Kirov Islands, the Voronina Island, the Izvestiy TSIK Islands, the Arkticheskiy Institut Islands, the Sverdrup Island, the Uyedineniya Island and a number of smaller islands. This section represents rather fully the natural and biological diversity of Arctic Sea islands of the eastern part of the Kara Sea.
- The Pyasina section. Includes the Pyasina Bay and the Pyasina river basin.
- The Middendorff Bay
- The Nordenskiöld Archipelago
- The Lower Taymyr section. Includes the basin of the Taymyr River (upper and lower), as well as Lake Taymyr.
- The Chelyuskin Peninsula. Includes the northern end of the Taymyr Peninsula
- The Northern Reserve (Североземельский).
- The Brekhovsky Islands Natural Reserve

== Ecoregion and climate ==
The Great Arctic Reserve is located in the Taimyr-Central Siberian tundra ecoregion, which covers the Taymyr Peninsula in the Russian Far North. The climate is Tundra (Köppen climate classification Tundra climate (ET)). This indicates a local climate in which at least one month has an average temperature high enough to melt snow (0 °C (32 °F)), but no month with an average temperature in excess of 10 °C (50 °F).

== Flora and fauna ==
Many animals and plants are meant to thrive within the Great Arctic State Nature Reserve without human disturbance. Among the animals that are protected by this reserve, some of the most important are the polar bear, the Arctic fox, the snowy owl, the reindeer and the beluga.
