= Kirov Islands =

Island group in the Kara Sea, Russian Federation

Russian: Острова Кирова
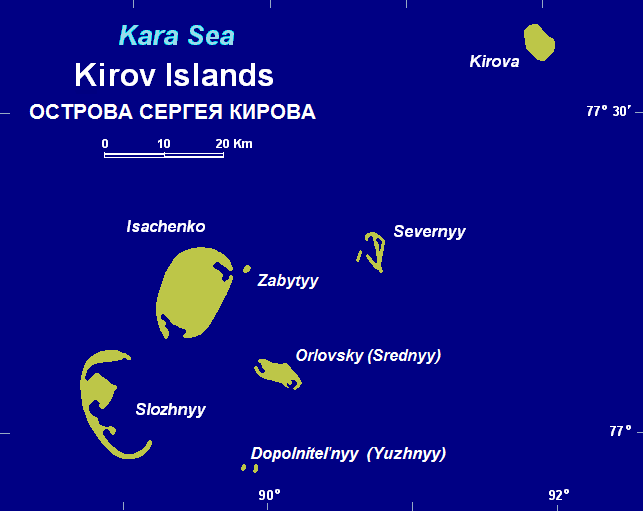

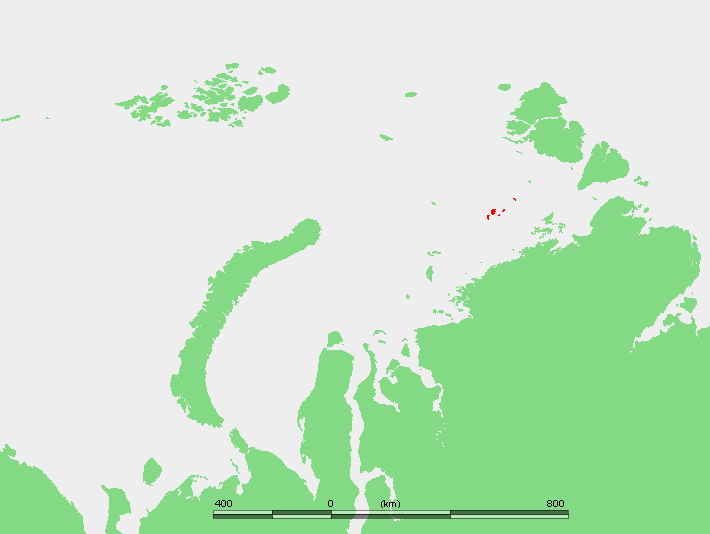
- Location of the island group in the Kara Sea

Geography
- Location: Kara Sea
- Coordinates: 77°36′N 91°55′E
- Total islands: 8
- Major islands: Isachenko Island
- Area: 280 km^{2} (110 sq mi)
- Highest elevation: 57 m (187 ft)
- Highest point: Isachenko HP

Administration
- Russian Federation

Demographics
- Population: 0

The Kirov Islands or Sergey Kirov Islands (Russian: Острова Кирова, Ostrova Kirova or Aрхипелаг Сергея Кирова, Archipelag Sergeya Kirova) is an island group in the Kara Sea, Russian Federation. It is an archipelago of small islands covered with tundra vegetation located about 140 km (87 mi) from the coast of Siberia and 100 km (62 mi) northwest of the Nordenskiöld Archipelago.

The Islands were discovered by the Georgiy Sedov icebreaker ship in 1930 during an expedition led by Otto Yulievich Schmidt and Vladimir Yulievich Wiese.

== Geography ==
This archipelago, as well as Kirov Island, its northernmost island which is located at the northeastern end somewhat detached from the main island cluster, is named after Joseph Stalin's politburo member Sergey Kirov. All islands are quite flat, mostly with sandy spits and coastal lagoons in their shores.

The group's largest island is Isachenko (Russian: Остров Исаченко), named after Boris Lavrent'evich Isachenko Russian microbiologist and botanist of the Academy of Sciences of the USSR. It has a surface of 180.6 km^{2} (69.7 sq mi) and the highest point in the archipelago. In 1954 a weather station (Isachenko Ostrovo) was founded on the Island by the Soviet Union and it has operated until 1994. The abandoned buildings and the debris can be still seen by satellite images.

The sea surrounding the Kirov Islands is covered with pack ice with some polynias in the winter and there are many ice floes even in the summer. The strait between Isachenko and Slozhnyy Island is known as Proliv Aeros"yëmki.

This island group belongs to the Krasnoyarsk Krai administrative division of the Russian Federation. They are also part of the Great Arctic State Nature Reserve (Russian: Большой Арктический государственный природный заповедник), the largest nature reserve of the Russian Federation.

The Kirov Archipelago is not to be confused with Kirovskiye Ostrova (Russian: Кировские Острова), a historic district of Saint Petersburg formed by a group of three coastal islands in the Gulf of Finland north of the Neva river delta.

== See also ==
- List of islands of Russia
