= Arkticheskiy Institut Islands =

Archipelago in the Kara Sea

Russian: Острова Арктического института
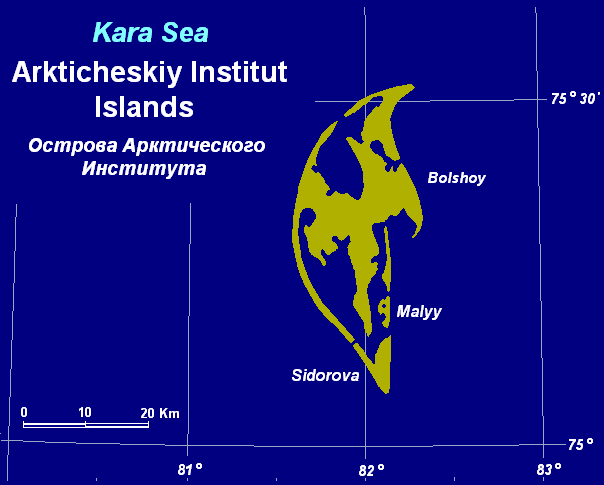
- Arkticheskiy Institut Islands

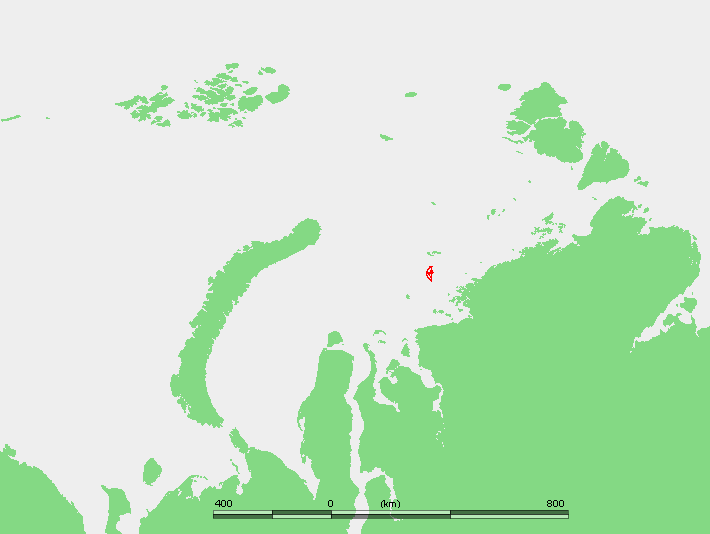
- Location of the Arkticheskiy Institut Islands in the Kara Sea.

Geography
- Location: Kara Sea
- Coordinates: 75°32′N 82°05′E
- Total islands: 4
- Major islands: Bolshoy

Administration
- Russia

Demographics
- Population: 0

The Arkticheskiy Institut Islands or Arctic Institute Islands (Russian: Острова Арктического института) is a compact archipelago of narrow islands covered with tundra vegetation. The islands are located in the Kara Sea, about 173 km (107 mi) north of the coast of Siberia, and just 45 km (28 mi) south of the nearest island group, the Izvesti Tsik Islands.

== Geography ==
The distance between the northern and the southern end of the archipelago is 49.5 km (30.8 mi) and its maximum width is 21 km (13 mi) from east to west. The main island is called Bolshoy.

The sea surrounding the Arkticheskiy Institut Islands is covered with packed ice in the long winter and the climate is severe. There are numerous ice floes even in the summer.

This island group belongs to the Krasnoyarsk Krai administrative division of the Russian Federation and is part of the Great Arctic State Nature Reserve, the largest nature reserve of Russia.

The Arkticheskiy Institut Islands were named in honor of the Arctic Institute of the USSR, which was then known as "All-Union Arctic Institute". The combination "Arkticheskiy Institut Islands" uses the Russian words for "arctic" and "institute" in a way which would be grammatically incorrect in Russian because of the Russian grammatical case system. The Russian name uses the genitive case to illustrate the islands' relationship to the institute, while the English name uses the nominative case and the relationship is inferred using word order. Transliterations like "Ostrova Arkticheskovo Instituta" as well as translations like "Arctic Institute Islands" may be used as an alternative, especially by Russian speakers writing for an English speaking audience.

Sidorova Island was named after Siberian trader and goldmine owner Mikhail K. Sidorov (1823-1887), who had a vision for the development of trade along the Northern Sea Route.

== See also ==
- Kara Sea
- List of islands of Russia
