= Konstantin Badygin =

Soviet Naval officer and explorer (1910–1984)

Konstantin Sergeyevich Badygin
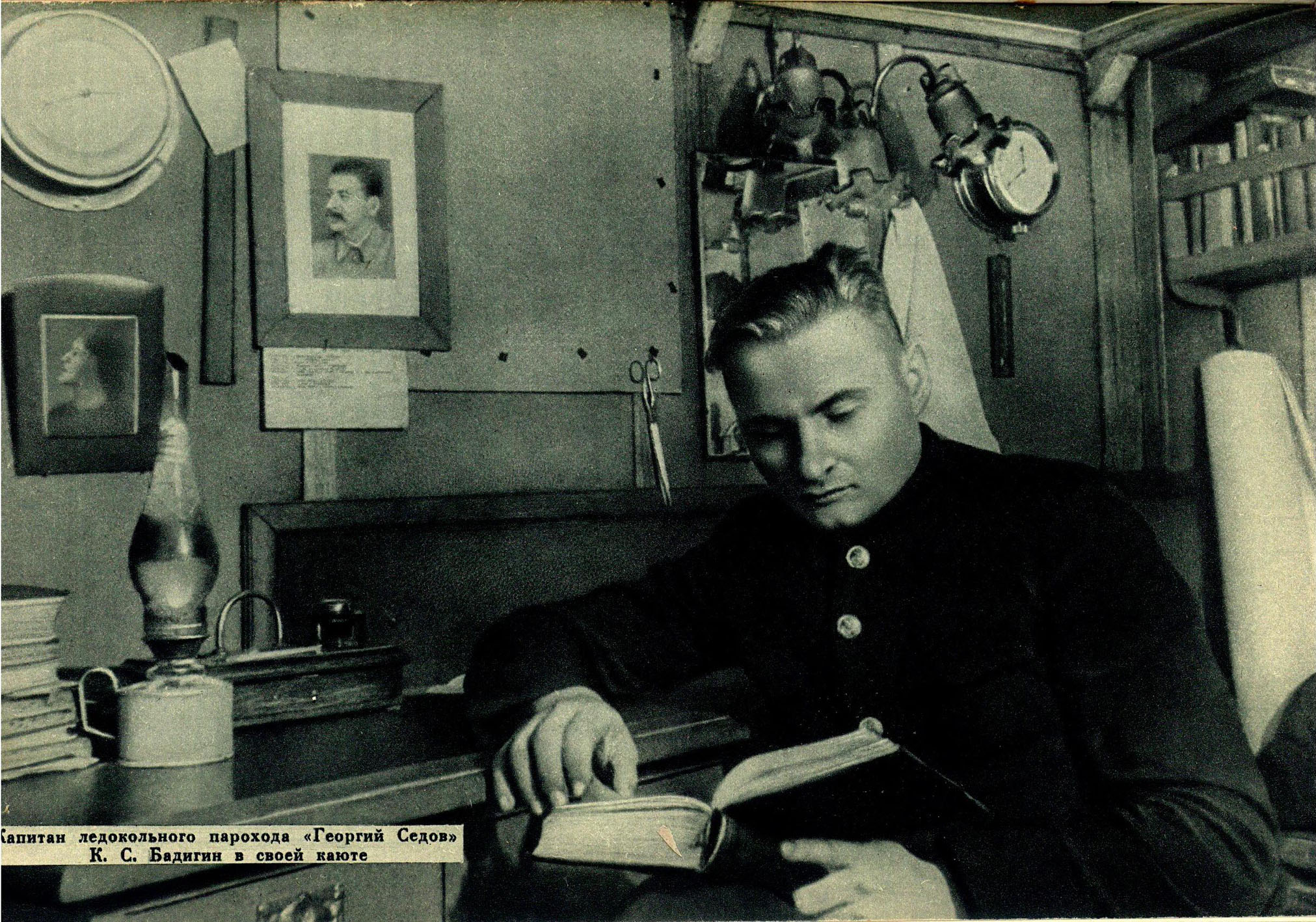
- Badigin in the cabin of steamship Georgy Sedov
- Native name: Константин Сергеевич Бадигин
- Born: 30 November 1910; Penza, Russian Empire
- Died: 15 March 1984 (aged 73) Moscow, Russian SFSR, Soviet Union
- Allegiance: Soviet Union
- Branch: Soviet Navy
- Service years: 1928–1945
- Rank: Captain
- Commands: Icebreaker Sedov
- Awards: Hero of the Soviet Union; Order of Lenin; Order of the Red Banner of Labour; Order of the Badge of Honour
- Other work: writer of Novels and historical works

Captain Konstantin Sergeyevich Badygin (or Badigin, Russian: Константин Сергеевич Бадигин; 30 November 1910 – 15 March 1984) was a Soviet naval officer, explorer, author, and scientist.

== Biography ==
Konstantin Sergeyevich Badygin began his naval career in 1928 as a sailor on Soviet ships in the Pacific Ocean. Later he studied in the Marine Technical School at Vladivostok and became a navigator and an officer in the Soviet Navy.

Between 1935 and 1936 he became the third officer aboard Icebreaker Krasin and in 1937 he became the second in command aboard Icebreaker Sedov.

Badygin became renowned in 1938 as captain of icebreaker Sedov when it was transformed into a Soviet Drifting Polar Station. In 1940 Badigin was awarded the title Hero of the Soviet Union for his work aboard the Sedov as both a naval officer and a scientist.

Between 1941 and 1943 he became the Chief of the Soviet ice-breaker fleet in the White Sea as well as the director of the Ice Survey Service.

In 1944 and 1945 he became the captain of merchant liner Clara Zetkin which plied the Vladivostok-Seattle route.

After the end of World War II Badigin asked to be relieved of active service owing to health reasons. Then he became an author and wrote three autobiographical works, as well as historical novels. He continued writing until his death in 1984.

== Soviet Polar Station "Sedov" ==
In the summer of 1937 the icebreaker Sadko sailed from Murmansk. Its original goal was to sail to Henrietta, Zhokhov, and Jeannette Islands, in the De Long group and carry out scientific research. The purpose of the expedition was also to find out how could the Northern Sea Route be used for regular shipping. But the Soviet naval authorities changed the plans and the ice-breaker was sent instead to help ships in distress in the Kara and Laptev Seas.

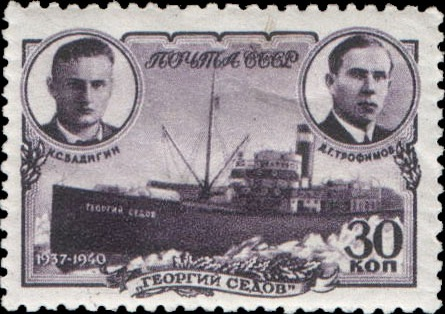
Konstantin Badygin on the upper left

The Sadko, however, became itself trapped in fast ice at 75°17'N and 132°28'E in the region of the New Siberian Islands. Two other Soviet icebreakers, the Sedov and the Malygin, both in the same area researching the ice conditions, became trapped by sea ice as well and drifted helplessly.

Owing to persistent bad weather conditions, part of the stranded crew members and some of the scientists could only be rescued in April 1938. And only on 28 August 1938, could Yermak free two of the three ships at 83°4'N and 138°22'E. The third ship, Sedov, had to be left to drift in its icy prison and was transformed into a scientific polar station. It kept drifting northwards in the ice towards the Pole, very much like Fridtjof Nansen's Fram had done in 1893–96. There were 15 crew aboard, led by Captain Konstantin Badygin and W. Kh. Buinitzki. The scientists aboard took 415 astronomical measurements, 78 electromagnetic observations, as well as 38 depth measurements by drilling the thick polar ice during their 812-day stay aboard the Sedov. Finally they were freed between Greenland and Svalbard by icebreaker Joseph Stalin on 18 January 1940.

Captain Badygin, as well as the crew and scientists were welcomed back in the Soviet Union as heroes. Later Captain Konstantin Badygin was awarded the Order of the Red Banner of Labour and became a Hero of the Soviet Union.

== Non-fiction literary works ==
- Men of the Ice-breaker Sedov, Hutchinsons, London
- Verschollen in Grumant, Kultur und Fortschritt, Berlin 1960
- 812 Tage im Eis der Arktis – Die Drift des Eismeerdampfers Georgi Sedow. Vienna, Globus-Verlag, 1946.
- Vom Eismeer zum Pazifik, Militärverlag der DDR Berlin, 1988, ISBN 3-327-00624-5

== See also ==
- Drifting ice station
- Professor Vize
