= Alphabet Fleet =

The Alphabet Fleet was a fleet of vessels owned and operated by the Reid Newfoundland Company as part of the provisioning of the 1898 Railway contract between the Dominion of Newfoundland and the Reid Newfoundland Company. The vessels were named after places in Scotland, the native homeland of Sir Robert Gillespie Reid, founder of the Reid Newfoundland Company.

The ships were employed as coastal vessels to service the remote communities of the Newfoundland and the coast of Labrador to operate a mail and passenger service to those communities. These vessels became the lifeline to these communities and were depicted in many paintings and folk songs of the country, even long after it became a province of Canada.

== Fleet ==
A
Alphabetically, the first on the list of vessels of the Reid Newfoundland Company was SS Argyle, built by A. & J. Inglis in Glasgow, Scotland in 1900. Launched on 19 December 1899, she was 155 feet (47 m) long with a gross register tonnage of 439. This vessel mainly visited communities in the Placentia Bay area. She was sold in 1941 to the S.S. Argyle Steamship Company of St. John's, Newfoundland. While bound from Baracoa to Miami with bananas, she was lost near Punta Gorda, Cuba on July 14, 1946. Argyle took her name from the Scottish region of Argyll.

B

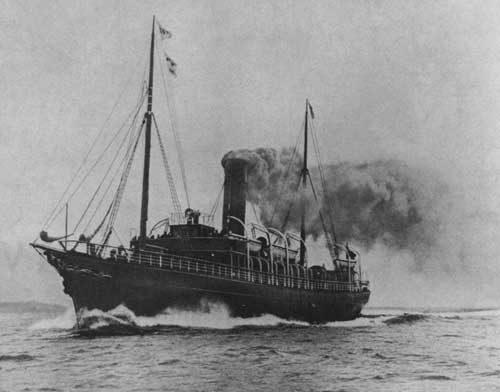
SS Bruce during sea trials, 1897.

SS Bruce was built by A. & J. Inglis in 1897 in Glasgow for service between Port aux Basques and North Sydney. Launched on 12 August 1897, she was 237 feet (72 m) long and registered at 1,154 gross tons. This vessel was lost on March 24, 1911, on the Main-a-Dieu rocks, seven miles from Louisburg, Nova Scotia; two lives were lost.

A second vessel commissioned under the name Bruce was built in 1912 Napier & Miller in Old Kilpatrick, Scotland. Launched on 9 December 1911, she was 240 feet (73 m) long and 1,553 gross register tons. Together with Beothic, Earl Grey and Lintrose, Bruce was sold to the Russian government in 1915 and renamed Solovey Budimirovich. Renamed Malygin in 1921, she was lost with all hands (98) off Cape Nizhny, Kamchatka, on 27/28 October 1940.

C

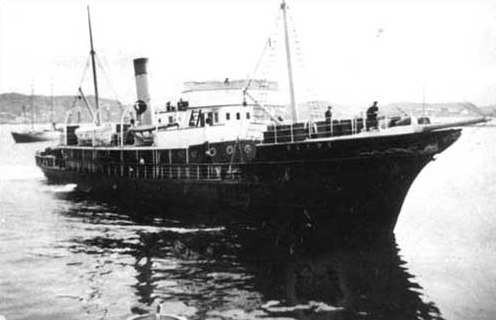
SS Clyde in port.

SS Clyde was built by A. & J. Inglis in 1900 at Glasgow and was 155 feet (47 m) long; 439 gross register tons. She was launched on 10 January 1900. Clyde plied the waters of Notre Dame Bay from Lewisporte, delivering passengers and mail to the various communities in that area. In 1948 she was sold to Crosbie and Company; her last duty was to provide standby power for the whaling station at Williamsport on White Bay. While in layup at Williamsport, she was driven ashore in a storm and wrecked on December 17, 1951.

D
SS Dundee was built in 1900, also by A. & J. Inglis at Glasgow, and launched on 4 June 1900; 155 feet (47 m) long and 439 gross register tons. She operated in the Bonavista Bay area from Port Blandford and was lost on Christmas Day, 1919 on Noggin Island, near Carmanville. The Passengers and crew were rescued by Clyde on 27 December.

E

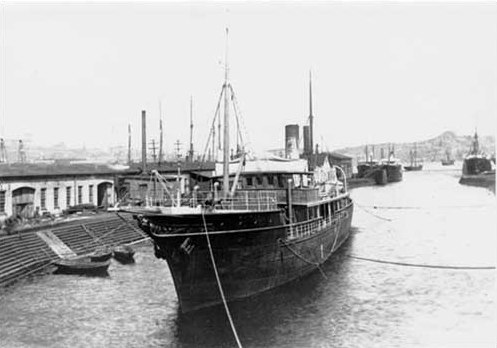
SS Ethie in the St. John's Drydock, also owned by the Reid Newfoundland Company.

SS Ethie was built at Glasgow by A. & J. Inglis in 1900. Launched on 20 June 1900, she was 155 feet (47 m) long with a gross register tonnage of 440. The ship was used on Conception and Trinity bays, coaling at Carmanville and Carbonear. later she was placed on the Bonne Bay-Battle Harbour run. On December 11, 1919, while carrying a cargo of codfish and herring from Battle Harbour, she was wrecked at Martin's Point, about 20 miles (32 km) from Bonne Bay. Captain Edward English saw that all passengers and crew were rescued by means of a boatswain's chair and a line sent ashore.

F
SS Fife was built at Glasgow by A. & J. Inglis in 1900. Launched on 14 August 1900, she was 167 feet (51 m) long and 439 gross register tons. The ship was lost on 17 November 1900 when she was wrecked at Twin Rocks in the Strait of Belle Isle.

G
SS Glencoe was built at Glasgow by A. & J. Inglis in 1899. She was launched on 31 October 1899 and was 208 feet (63 m) long and 767 gross register tons. The ship was used on Placentia and Fortune Bays, and later on the South Coast run. Glencoe survived and was eventually sold for scrapping at Sorel, Quebec in June 1959.

H
SS Home built by A. & J. Inglis at Glasgow, Scotland in 1900. Launched on 8 September 1900, she was 155 feet (47 m) long and 439 gross register tons. Her route was between Trepassy, Newfoundland and Hopedale, Labrador. Sold in 1948 to the Home Steamship Company, Ltd., she was lost when she broke her moorings on 18 November 1952, stranding at Jerseyman Harbour in Fortune Bay.

I
SS Invermore was built by Barclay Curle and Co. of Glasgow, Scotland in 1881. Originally named Dromedary and launched on 15 February 1881, she was 250 long and 922 gross register tons. She was originally owned by John Burns (from 1905 by G. & J. Burns) and operated between Belfast and Glasgow. In 1909 she was acquired by the Reid Newfoundland Company and renamed Invermore. Under the Alphabet Fleet she served on the Labrador service, carrying passengers and mail to remote communities. While northbound with provisions and fishery supplies, she was lost at Brig Harbour Point, Labrador on July 10, 1914.

J
The criteria for naming his ships was that the first letter of each ship's name had to depict a place from Reid's homeland Scotland, they were also to end in "e". For this reason the letter "J" was not used, as no suitable candidate could be found.

K

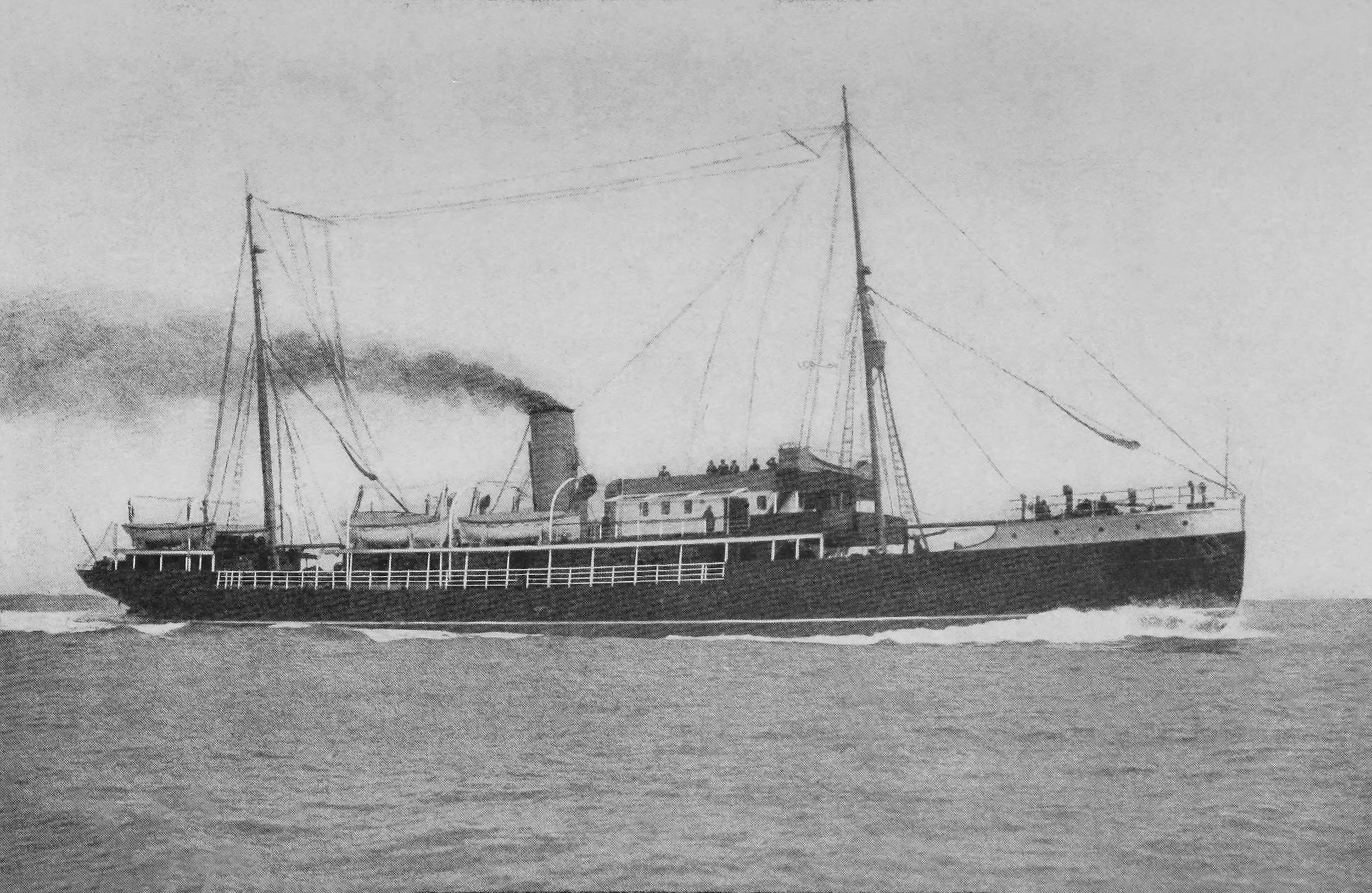
SS Kyle during sea trials, 1913

SS Kyle was built by Swan, Hunter and Co. at Wallsend, Tyne and Wear, England in 1913. Launched on 7 April 1913, she was 220 feet (67 m) long and 1,055 gross register tons. She began service in Newfoundland in 1913 for the Labrador route. In 1915 Kyle was shifted to the Port aux Basques-North Sydney service until 1926 when she once again returned to the Labrador service. Sold in 1959 to Arctic Shipping Ltd. and renamed Arctic Eagle, she was acquired by Kyle Shipping Ltd. in 1961, reverting to her original name. While working as a sealer, in 1965 Kyle was damaged beyond economic repair by heavy ice. Driven aground by a storm while idle at Harbour Grace on 4 February 1967, the vessel was sold to Dominion Metals Salvage Company but was deemed too expensive to scrap. Left in situ, Kyle was purchased by the Government of Newfoundland in 1973. She remains there today.

Kyle is noteworthy for a number of rescues she had participated in; such as the search and recovery of the downed American plane Old Glory in 1927. She had also aided in the rescue of the sailors during the USS Pollux and USS Truxton disaster at Chambers Cove near St. Lawrence on February 18, 1942.

L
SS Lintrose was built by Swan, Hunter and Co. at Wallsend, Tyne and Wear, England in 1913. Launched on 21 January 1913, she was 255 feet (78 m) long and 1,616 gross register tons. In 1915 the ship was sold to the Russian government and renamed Sadko, where she operated as an ice breaking vessel in the White Sea. She sank on 20 June 1916 and was refloated in 1933. Restored to service as an icebreaker, she was again lost on 11 September 1941.

M
Alphabetically, the last of the Alphabet Fleet was SS Meigle, built in Glasgow, Scotland in 1881 as Solway by the firm Barclay Curle and Co. and launched on 20 September 1881. She was and iron vessel of 783 gross register tons and 220 feet (67 m) long. Originally owned by William Sloan & Company of Glasgow, Solway was sold to George Bazeley & Company of Penzance in 1907. Acquired by the Reid interests in 1911 and renamed Meigle, the vessel served as a passenger and cargo ferry until going into layup in 1931. She was used as an auxiliary jail at St. John's from 29 October 1932 to 30 June 1933, after which she became a salt storage vessel. In 1936 she was sold to the Shaw Steamship Co. Limited. She was pressed into war service and was part of a convoy that was attacked by German U-boats. On 19 July 1947 she was wrecked at Marines Cove, near St. Shotts. Meigle was one of the vessels that responded to the 1929 tsunami on the Burin Peninsula assisting in bringing supplies for victim relief.

The song Twenty-One years a popular Newfoundland folk ballad by Joseph Summers was written at the time the vessel served as a prison ship. Parts of the vessel are on display at the Meigle Lounge in Seal Cove, Conception Bay South.

== Other Ships ==
Two ships in the Reid Newfoundland fleet did not adhere to the Alphabet Fleet naming system: Virginia Lake, acquired after the loss of Fife, and Sagona, acquired in 1914.

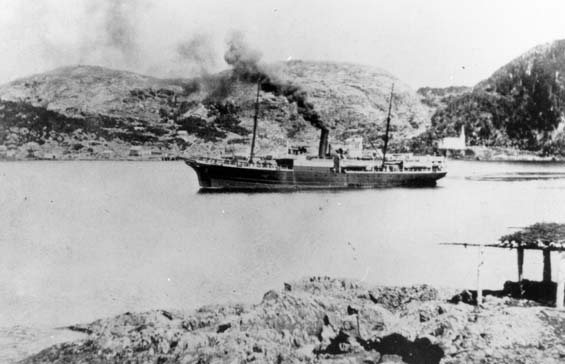
SS Virginia Lake in a way-port.

SS Virginia Lake was originally named Conscript and was built in 1888 by A. McMillian & Company, Dumbarton, Scotland. Launched on 10 March 1888, she was 180 feet long with a gross register tonnage of 760. A vessel of composite construction (iron frame with wood planking), she sailed from Glasgow on April 13, 1888, bound for St. John's on a charter to the Allan Line. She then went into service between St. John's and St. Anthony for her original owner, A. Harvey & Company. Renamed Virginia Lake in 1892, she was acquired by Robert Gillespie Reid in 1901. Besides passenger and freight service, she engaged in sealing seasonally from 1901 until her loss on 6 April 1909. Badly damaged by ice, she was set on fire and abandoned to sink; 110 of her crew were picked up by the steamer Bellaventure, while another 50 walked seven miles to shore on one of the Funk Islands.

SS Sagona was built in 1912 by the Dundee Shipbuilding Company at Dundee, Scotland. She was 175 feet long and registered at a gross tonnage of 808. Launched on 19 January 1912, she was originally managed by John C. Crosbie's firm, Crosbie and Company, for the Newfoundland Produce Company. In 1914 she was acquired by the Reid Newfoundland Company for passenger and freight service. She also engaged in sealing from 1912 to 1938; during the latter part of that period, her summer service was between Bonne Bay and Battle Harbour. Sold in 1941 to the Colliford Clark Company of London, she was acquired in 1944 by the Zarati Steamship Company Ltd. and registered in Panama. While bound from Nice to Toulon, she sank on 21 November 1945 after striking a mine five miles southeast of Porquerolles Island.

== See also ==
- CN Marine
- John Chalker Crosbie
- Marine Atlantic
- Newfoundland Railway
- Railway Coastal Museum
- Robert Gillespie Reid
- Reid Newfoundland Company
- Terra Transport
