= St. John's Street Railway Company =

St. John's Street Railway
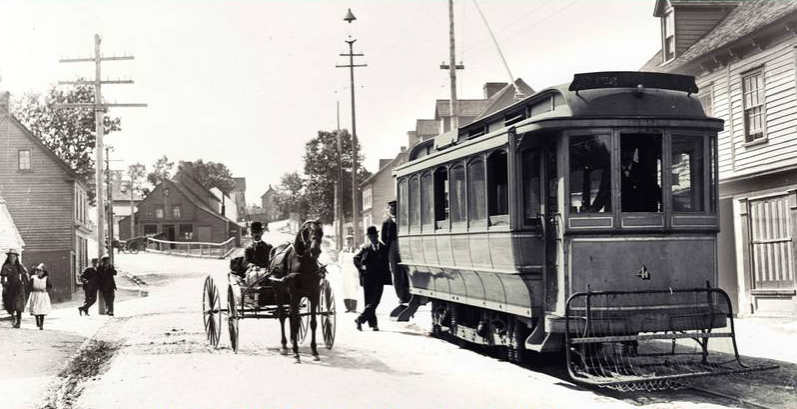

Overview
- Locale: St. John's, Newfoundland
- Transit type: Streetcar

Operation
- Began operation: 1900
- Operator: St. John's Street Railway Company
- Character: Street running

Technical
- Electrification: Third rail, 50 Hz, 600 V DC

The St. John's Street Railway Company was formed by Robert G. Reid in 1896 to build an electrical railway in St. John's to provide urban transportation using street cars.

The company was given the rights to build an electrical generating station at Petty Harbour and build a transmission line to St. John's from the Petty Harbour Generating Station. The power was 50-cycle power. The first street cars were from the Larivière Car Company out of Montreal, Quebec. The cars had a maximum capacity of 50 passengers and traveled at 8 miles per hour.

The streetcar system used the same narrow gauge as Reid's Newfoundland Railway.

St. John's streetcar system was built three years before the first automobile was imported into Newfoundland, a Thomas Motor Company Thomas Flyer 50HP Seven Passenger Touring Car, owned by Reid.

In 1925 the Newfoundland Light and Power Company took ownership of the company. The cars were then changed out with cars from the Birney Car Company of Ottawa and could reach 20 miles per hour.

During World War II the public, and visiting sailors, relied on the streetcar system, as ownership of automobiles was confined to the wealthy, and the owners of taxis.

== See also ==
- Newfoundland Railway
- Reid Newfoundland Company
- List of street railways in Canada
