= SS Sagona =

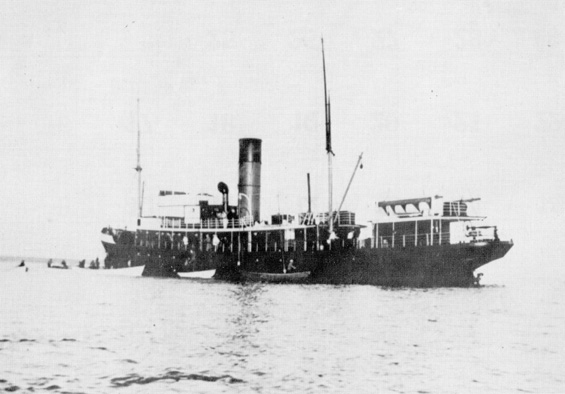
- SS Sagona in Reid Newfoundland colors

History
- Owner: Newfoundland Produce Company/Crosbie & Company, managers (1912–14); Reid Newfoundland Company (1914-1923); Newfoundland Railway (1923–1941); Colliford Clarke Company (1941–44); Zarati Steamship Company, Ltd. (1944-45)
- Builder: Dundee Shipbuilding Company
- Launched: 19 January 1912
- Fate: Mined 21 November 1945

General characteristics
- Type: Passenger and cargo; also used for sealing
- Tonnage: 808 GRT
- Length: 175 feet between perpendiculars
- Beam: 28 feet

SS Sagona was a passenger and freight ferry used in ferry service on the northern coastal routes between the island of Newfoundland and the coast of Labrador in Canada. In winter, Sagona was primarily a sealing vessel, bringing in a total of 165,599 seals from 1912 until 1938 under captains Job Knee, Jack Randell, Lewis Little and Jacob Kean.

== Vessel history ==
Sagona was built in 1912 at Dundee, Scotland by the Dundee Shipbuilding Company. A steel steamship of 808 gross register tons, she measured 175 feet (53 m) in length and could accommodate 50 salon and 40 steerage passengers. Her hull was reinforced with double rows of pitch pine for ice breaking capability. Sagona was built for the Newfoundland Produce Company and was managed by Crosbie & Company. She arrived in St. John's on 14 March 1912 under the command of Captain Marshall. Sagona made its first trip to the seal hunt on 15 March 1912 under Captain S.R. Winsor.

In 1914, Sagona was acquired by the Reid Newfoundland Company, which operated a series of coastal steamer routes as well as the Newfoundland Railway. On 16 January 1920, Sagona ran aground at Halifax, Nova Scotia, but incurred only minor damage.

Sagona and the rest of the Reid Newfoundland fleet were acquired in 1923 by the Newfoundland government as part of the arrangement that saw the country acquire the railway.

During the winter sealing season of 1933, Sagona helped in the rescue of survivors of the SS Viking disaster in March of that year.

In the map published with the Newfoundland Royal Commission Report 1933, Sagona was shown as serving in summer the coastal steamer route between Bonne Bay, Newfoundland and Battle Harbour, Labrador.

Last used as a sealer in 1938, Sagona was sold by the Newfoundland Railway in 1941 to the Colliford Clarke Company of London. In 1944 the vessel was acquired by the Zarati Steamship Company, Ltd., with registry transferred to Panama.

== Fate ==
Sagona was bound from Nice to Toulon when she was lost on 21 November 1945 after striking a mine five miles southeast of Porquerolles Island.

== See also ==
- Alphabet Fleet
- CN Marine
- John Chalker Crosbie
- Marine Atlantic
- Newfoundland Railway
- Reid Newfoundland Company
