= SS Kyle =

Newfoundland steamship

Coordinates: 47.670525°N 53.253877°W

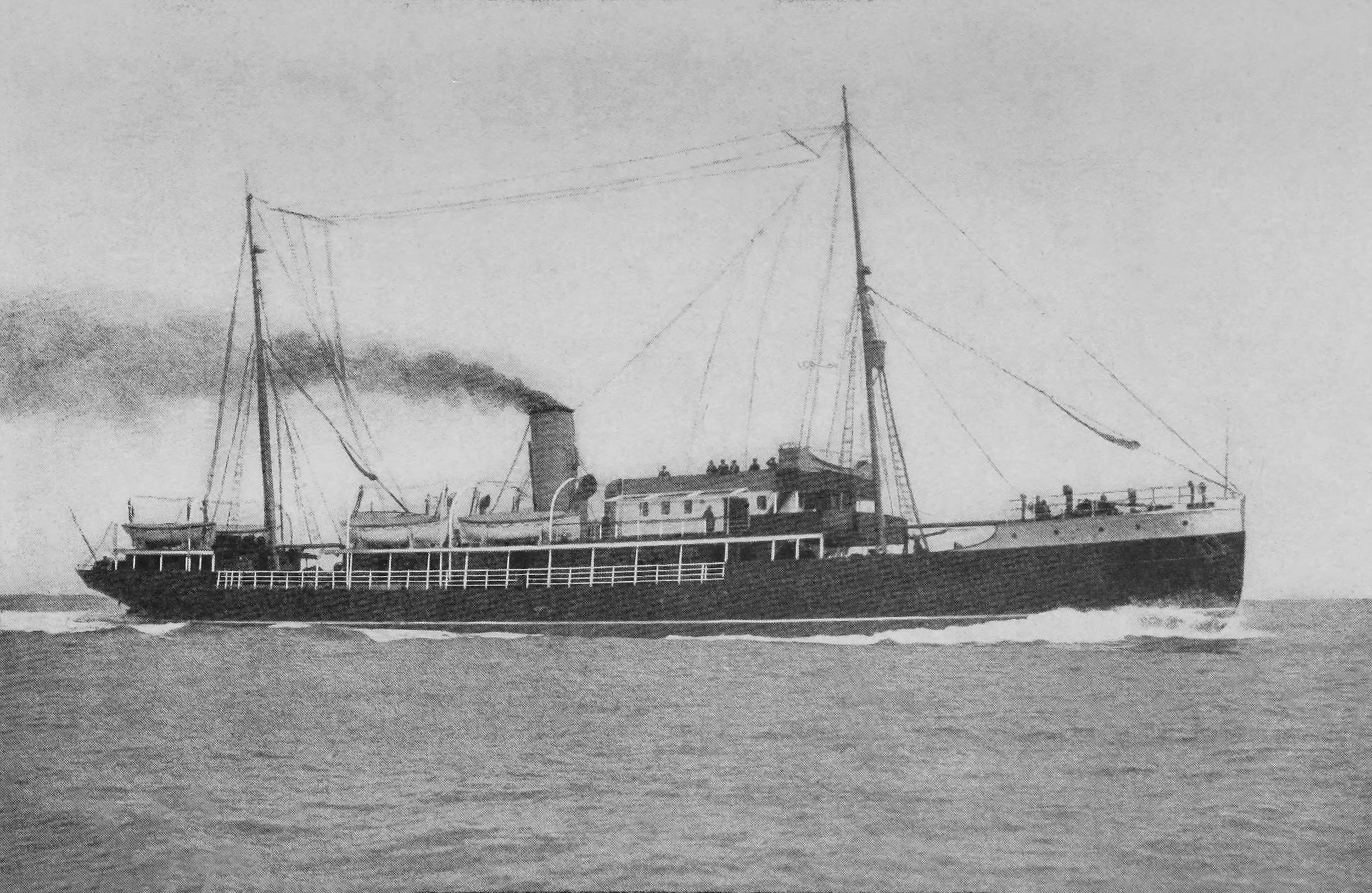
- SS Kyle during sea trials, 1913

History
- Name: Kyle
- Owner: Reid Newfoundland Company
- Route: Carbonear to Labrador (1926-1959)
- Ordered: Reid Company of Newfoundland
- Builder: Swan Hunter, Wallsend, Tyne and Wear
- Yard number: 906
- Launched: 7 April 1913, by Mrs R. G. Reid, widow of founder of the Reid Newfoundland Company
- Completed: May 1913
- Fate: Grounded in Harbour Grace since 4 February 1967, when she was forced to her final resting place by icebergs.

SS Kyle is a 220-foot (67 m) steam ship that is aground in the harbour of the Town of Harbour Grace, Newfoundland and Labrador, Canada. She ran ashore in February 1967. Intended to transport supplies and provide transportation from Carbonear to Labrador, she was also used to transport infantry to Canada during World War II. After her grounding on the shores of Riverhead, Harbour Grace, she has had several owners, from the Earle Brothers Freighting Company, Dominion Metals, and the Government of Newfoundland. Plans to have the vessel moved to the town of Salmon Cove, Newfoundland, and turned into a museum were later aborted due to financial implications.

== Background ==
Kyle, as part of the Alphabet Fleet, was named in accordance with the naming convention of the Reid Newfoundland Company which stated that their ships must bear the name of a Scottish town. The ship was launched on 7 April 1913 at Swan Hunter, Wallsend, England, sponsored by Mrs. R.G. Reid, widow of the founder of the Reid Newfoundland Company. Though her primary use was the transportation of goods and civilians from Carbonear to Labrador, she also transported soldiers from Newfoundland to Canada during World War II, and was an icebreaker in the winter as she was equipped with a heavy forward end and spoon-shaped bow designed for such purposes. She was known by Newfoundlanders as the "Bulldog of the North". While she may not have been the largest boat in the Reid Company's fleet, she was the fastest, and played a role in ferrying passengers and cargo in Newfoundland and Labrador.

== Ship's statistics ==
Kyle is 220 feet (67 m) in length, 32 feet (9.8 m) wide with a depth of 18 feet (5.5 m), and a gross tonnage of 1,055 tonnes. Kyle was built with a 3-cylinder triple-expansion steam engine and had a speed of 22 miles per hour (19 knots). She was fitted to carry 68 first class and 142 second class passengers.

On her delivery voyage, Kyle arrived at St. John's, Newfoundland on 20 May 1913

== Service history ==
Kyle entered service in 1913 on the Northwest Coast run, under the command of Captain Lorenzo Stevenson. In 1915 she was shifted to the route between Port aux Basques, Newfoundland and North Sydney, Nova Scotia. In 1923 the Government of Newfoundland assumed control of both the Alphabet Fleet and the Newfoundland Railway. Upon being replaced on the Nova Scotia run by the new SS Caribou, Kyle was moved in 1926 to the route between Carbonear and Labrador ports.

After 33 years of service on the Labrador run, Kyle was sold in 1959 to Arctic Shipping Ltd. of St. John's and renamed Arctic Eagle. Upon sale to Kyle Shipping Ltd. (an affiliate of the Earle Brothers Freighting Company) in 1961, she was renamed Kyle and used as a sealer.

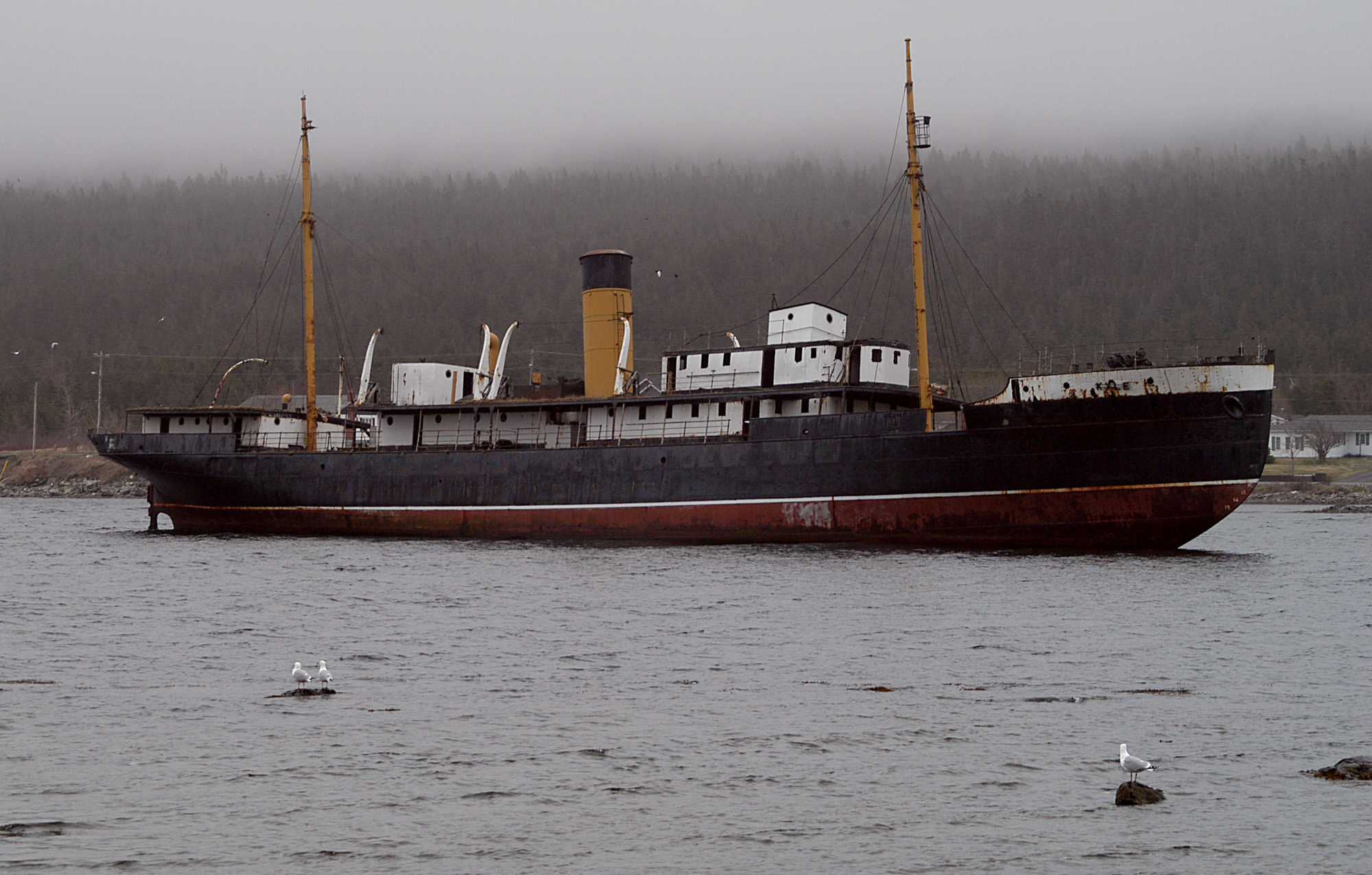
The grounded ship in 2010

The last master of Kyle was Captain Eric "Guy" Earle. In 1965 the vessel received such extensive damage from heavy ice that she was considered uneconomic to repair. While out of service, she was driven aground at Harbour Grace during a storm on 4 February 1967. Kyle was sold to the Dominion Metals Salvage Company, which determined the vessel to be too expensive to salvage. In 1973 the hulk was purchased by the Government of Newfoundland for $4,000. The hulk was repainted in 1997, but this was only a cosmetic measure, and by 2014 serious structural deterioration left Kyle's future in serious doubt.

== See also ==
- Alphabet Fleet
- Newfoundland Railway
- Reid Newfoundland Company
