= Sadko (1913 icebreaker) =

Soviet icebreaker ship

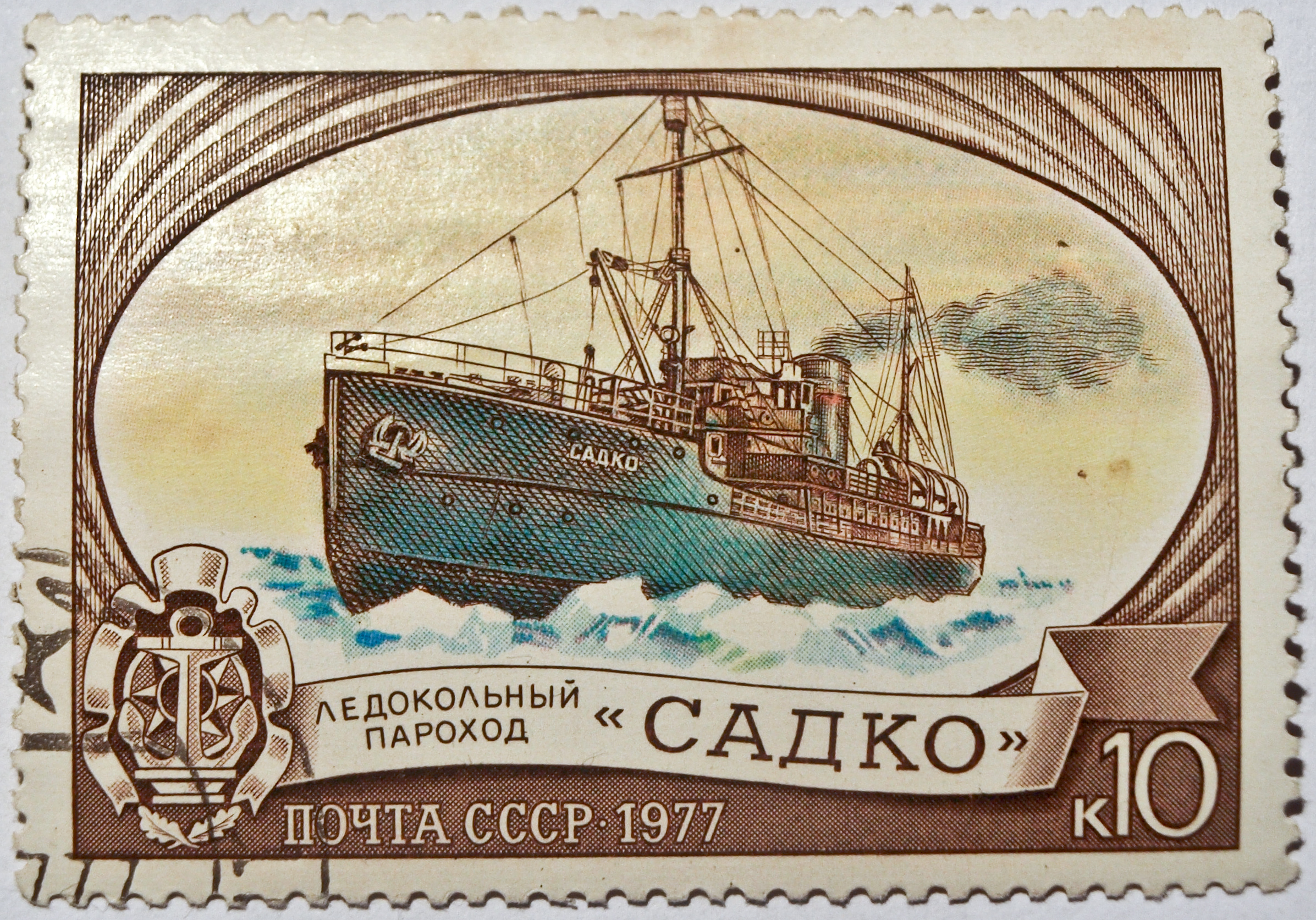
- 1977 Soviet stamp depicting Sadko

History

Newfoundland
- Name: SS Lintrose
- Owner: Reid Newfoundland Company
- Port of registry: St. John's
- Route: Port aux Basques–North Sydney
- Builder: Swan, Hunter & Wigham Richardson Ltd., Low Walker
- Yard number: 898
- Laid down: 1912
- Launched: 21 January 1913
- Completed: 14 March 1913
- Acquired: 29 March 1913
- Identification: official number 115619; code letters UPCT
- Fate: Sold, 1915

Russian Empire
- Name: Sadko
- Namesake: Sadko
- Owner: Russian Empire
- Operator: Russian Ministry of Commerce and Industry
- Acquired: 1915
- Fate: Sank 20 June 1916

Soviet Union
- Name: Sadko
- Owner: Soviet Union
- Acquired: Refloated 14 October 1933
- In service: 9 July 1934
- Fate: Sank after grounding 11 September 1941

General characteristics
- Type: Icebreaker
- Tonnage: 1,616 GRT; 683 NRT
- Displacement: 3,800 tonnes
- Length: 77.7 m (255 ft)
- Beam: 11.4 m (37 ft)
- Height: 6.9 m (23 ft)
- Installed power: 587 nhp
- Propulsion: 1 x 3-cylinder triple-expansion steam engine; 1 x screw propeller
- Speed: 15 knots (28 km/h; 17 mph) or; 13 knots (24 km/h; 15 mph)

Sadko (Russian: Садко) was a Soviet icebreaker known for its role in scientific expeditions in the Arctic. Built as SS Lintrose in 1913 for ferry service in Newfoundland, she was sold to the government of the Russian Empire in 1915 and renamed Sadko. In Russia, she was used as a freighter in the Arctic before sinking in 1916.

She was refloated in 1933 by the Soviet government and put back into service as an Arctic science and exploration vessel. She participated in two particularly notable expeditions: one attempting to reach Kvitøya in 1935 and another attempting to locate the mythical Sannikov Land in 1937–38. Sadko ran aground and sank for a second time in 1941 during an expedition in the Kara Sea.

== Early history ==
=== Construction ===
Sadko was built by Swan, Hunter & Wigham Richardson Ltd. at the Neptune Yard in Low Walker, England in 1912–13, as an icebreaking passenger and freight steamer. Launched on 21 January 1913, the vessel was originally constructed for the Reid Newfoundland Company, which was the main ferry operator in the Dominion of Newfoundland from 1901 to 1923. The ship was a part of the Alphabet Fleet, the company's ferry fleet. The vessel was named the SS Lintrose in line with the fleet's eponymous naming convention, in which each ship was named after a location in Scotland starting with a different letter of the alphabet. The vessel was a part of the last group of ships ordered directly by the company, alongside the SS Kyle and the second SS Bruce.

=== Reid Newfoundland Company ===
On 16 March 1913, Lintrose embarked on its journey across the Atlantic to Newfoundland. The transit proved to be unexpectedly long due to poor weather. The ship first sustained damage near the Isle of Wight, where waves damaged woodwork on the bridge deck and upper bridge. The following day, another wave flooded the vessel's forecastle and destroyed the bunks of the cooks and firemen. Lintrose finally arrived at its future home port of St. John's on 29 March 1913. While in Reid service, Lintrose plied the ferry route between Port aux Basques, Newfoundland and North Sydney, Canada.

=== Russian service and sinking ===
In 1915, after the outbreak of World War I, Lintrose was sold to the Russian Empire for use by the Ministry of Commerce and Industry as an icebreaker and cargo ship in the Arctic, along with her sister ship, the new SS Bruce. She was renamed Sadko, after the hero of a Russian bylina. On 20 June 1916, she sank in the Kandalaksha Gulf with a payload for the construction of the Kandalaksha–Murmansk railroad.

== Soviet service ==
=== Refloating and return to service ===
In 1932–33, Sadko was salvaged by the EPRON team led by Timofey Ivanovich Bobritsky, chief engineer. Refloated on 14 October 1933, she underwent repair and a complete refit at Arkhangelsk, emerging on 9 July 1934 on a trial voyage. Artur Karlovich Burke (1891–1942) was her captain. Burke also took Sadko on her first expedition to the Kara Sea, which lasted from 22 July to 25 September 1934, confirming the excellent work that had been done in restoring the ship to service.

The next season, in 1935, she took part in an expedition led by Georgy Ushakov (1901–1963) with N.M. Nikolaev as captain of Sadko and Nikolay N. Zubov (1885–1960) as scientific director, engaging in deep-sea research and an attempt to reach Kvitøya in the Arctic Ocean.

=== Sannikov Land expedition ===
In the summer of 1937, Sadko sailed from Murmansk with Nikolay Ivanovich Khramtsov as expedition leader, N.M. Nikolaev as captain of Sadko, and Vladimir Vize (1886-1954) as scientific director. Also taking part in this expedition was a Polikarpov U-2SP floatplane capable of landing on and taking off from the ice. The original goal was to sail to Henrietta, Zhokhov and Jeanette Islands in the De Long group, search for Sannikov Land and carry out scientific research. The purpose of the expedition was also to find out how the Northern Sea Route could be used for regular shipping. But the Soviet naval authorities changed the plans and the ice-breaker was sent instead to help ships in distress in the Kara and Laptev Seas.

Sadko, however, became itself trapped in fast ice at 75°17'N and 132°28'E in the region of the New Siberian Islands. Other two Soviet icebreakers, Sedov and Malygin, in the same area researching the ice conditions, became trapped by sea ice as well and drifted helplessly.

Owing to persistent bad weather conditions, part of the stranded crew members and some of the scientists could only be rescued in April 1938. They were evacuated using ANT-6-4M-34R Aviaarktika aircraft (a specialized Arctic variant of the Tupolev TB-3 four-engine bomber) under the command of the famed Soviet Arctic aviator Anatoly Dmitrievich Alekseev (1902-1974). It was only on 28 August 1938 that the icebreaker Yermak could free two of the three ships stuck at 83°4'N and 138°22'E, Sadko and Malygin. The third ship, Sedov, had to be left to drift in its icy prison and was transformed into a scientific Polar Station.

=== Second sinking ===
Sadko sank on 11 September 1941 in the Kara Sea, after running aground on an uncharted reef near Franz Josef Land. Her crew were rescued by the icebreaker Lenin. Captain A.G. Korelsky was accused of sabotage and shot. Owing to the lack of information about the vessel's loss, as late as 1949 Sadko was still pictured and described in Jane's Fighting Ships.

== Legacy ==
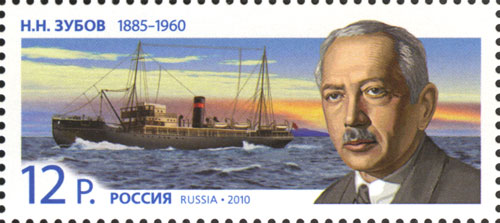
2010 Russian stamp depicting Sadko next to scientist Nikolay Zubov

An island in the Nordenskiöld Archipelago was named after Sadko.

In 1977 a Soviet postage stamp honoring Sadko was issued, with the first day of issue postmarked at Moscow on 27 July 1977. A Russian postage stamp honoring Nikolay N. Zubov in 2010 included a portrait of Zubov with an illustration of Sadko at sea.

There is a scale model of Sadko in the Museum of the Murmansk Shipping Company in Murmansk.

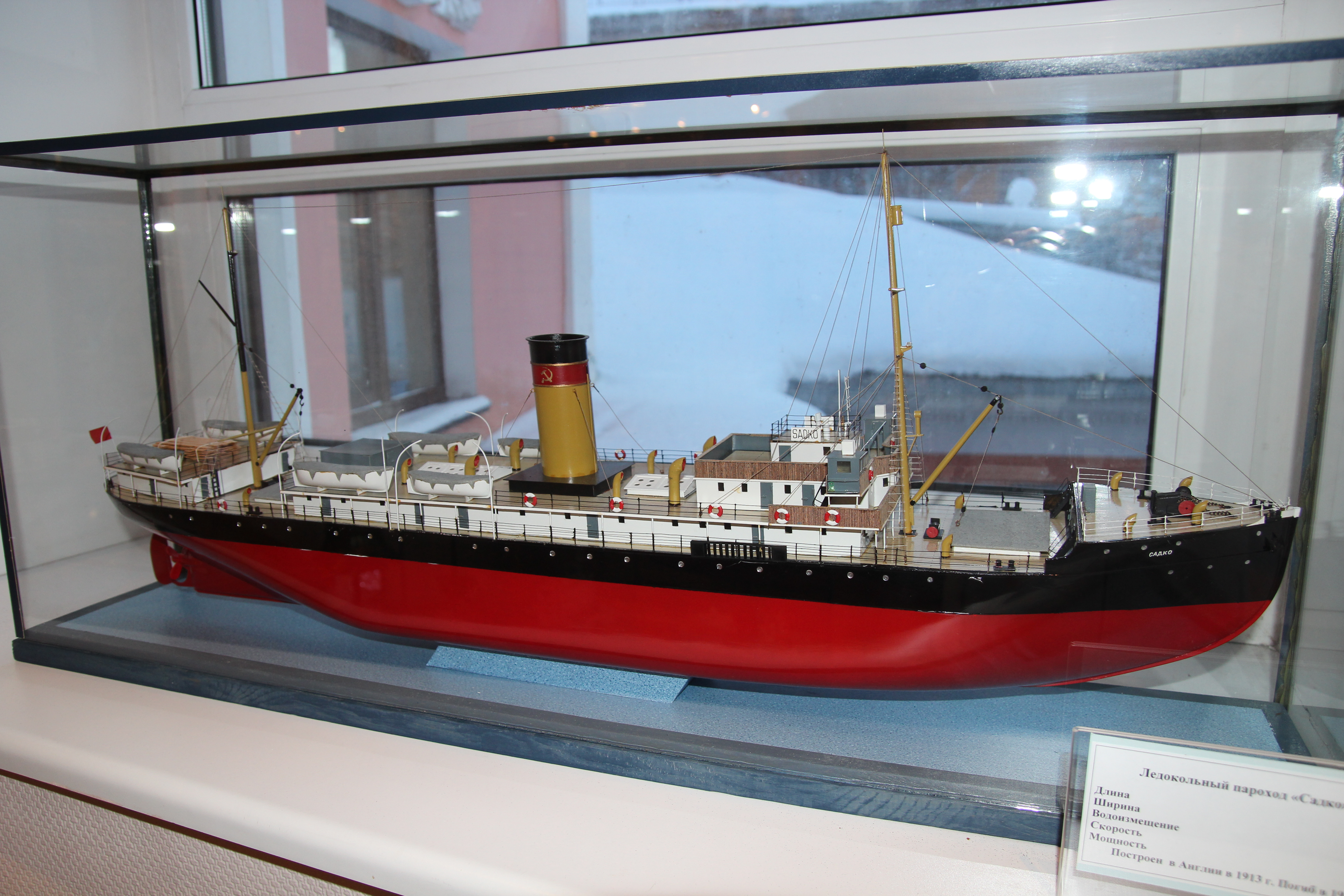
Scale model of Sadko

== See also ==
- Alphabet Fleet
- Malygin (1912 icebreaker), originally SS Bruce, sister ship of Lintrose
- Fyodor Litke (1909 icebreaker), originally CGC Earl Grey, another icebreaker sold to the Russian Empire in 1915
