= PHMC =

PHMC may refer to:

- Pennsylvania Historical and Museum Commission
- Public Health Management Corporation
- Petty Harbour-Maddox Cove
