= George Middleton =

George Middleton may refer to:

- George Middleton (activist) (1735–1815), African-American Revolutionary War veteran, activist, and Freemason
- George Augustus Middleton (1791–1848), English-Australian pastor and farmer
- George Middleton (American politician) (1800–1888), New Jersey congressman
- George H. Middleton (died 1892), Scottish engineer
- George "Bay" Middleton (1846–1892), British equestrian
- Sir George Middleton (British politician) (1876–1938), Labour member of parliament for Carlisle 1922–1924, 1929–1931
- George E. Middleton, American film director and producer
- George Middleton (playwright) (1880–1967), American playwright, director, and producer
- George Middleton (trade unionist) (1898–1971), general secretary of the Scottish Trades Union Congress
- Sir George Middleton (diplomat) (1910–1998), British diplomat
