= Sibir (1937 icebreaker) =

Soviet icebreaker

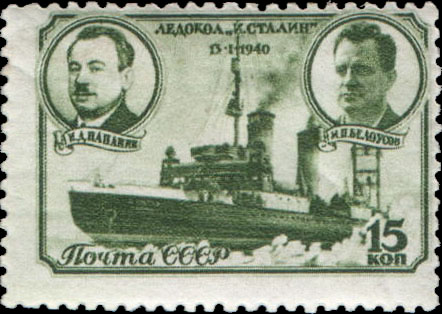
- Icebreaker I. Stalin on the USSR postage stamp (1940)

History

Soviet Union
- Name: I. Stalin (1938–1956); Sibir (1956–1973)
- Namesake: Joseph Stalin
- Builder: Ordzhonikidze Yard, Leningrad
- Launched: 14 August 1937
- In service: 1938
- Renamed: Sibir, c.1956
- Fate: Broken up, 1973

General characteristics
- Type: Icebreaker
- Tonnage: 4,866 GRT
- Displacement: 11,000 long tons (11,177 t)
- Length: 107 m (351 ft)
- Beam: 23 m (75 ft)
- Draught: 9.3 m (31 ft)
- Propulsion: 3 × triple expansion steam engines, 10,050 hp (7.49 MW); Coal-fired boilers; 3 stern and 1 bow propellers; Diesel electric engines for cruising
- Speed: 15.5 knots (28.7 km/h; 17.8 mph)
- Crew: 142
- Armament: (in World War II) three 76mm guns, seven 20mm AA guns
- Aircraft carried: (pre-World War II) three
- Aviation facilities: (post-World War II) helicopter deck
- Notes: all characteristics (except armament) come from

The Sibir (from 1938 to 1956, the Iosef Stalin) was the first Soviet icebreaker built at a domestic shipyard.

Owing to many delays, it took over two years to finish. It was built at the Ordzhonikidze Yard in Leningrad (now St. Petersburg) between 1937 and 1938.

The I. Stalin was the biggest icebreaker of the Soviet fleet at that time. In 1938 it reached the Arctic in its first expedition.

The I. Stalin freed the icebreaker Sedov on January 18, 1940, between Greenland and Svalbard after it had been drifting as a scientific Soviet polar station for a long time.

As part of the de-Stalinization of the USSR, the ship was renamed Sibir in 1956.

== See also ==
- Konstantin Badygin
