= Georgiy Sedov (1908 icebreaker) =

Soviet ice-breaker

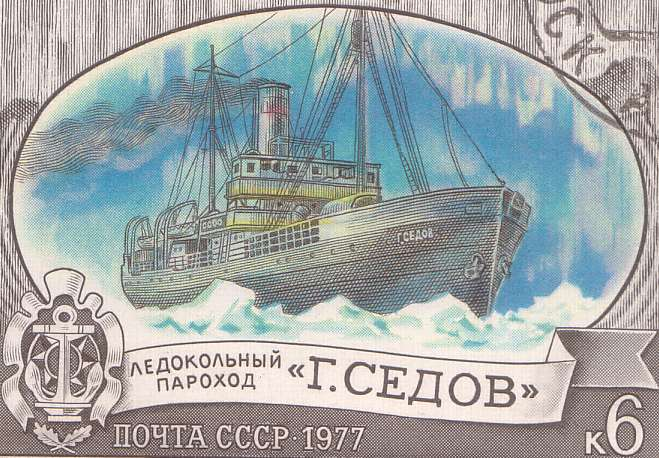
- G. Sedov on a Soviet postage stamp

History

United Kingdom
- Name: Beothic
- Owner: Thetis Steam Ship Co Ltd
- Operator: Job Bros, St John's, Newfoundland
- Port of registry: St John's, Newfoundland
- Builder: D & W Henderson Ltd, Glasgow
- Yard number: 464
- Launched: 25 December 1908
- Maiden voyage: 28 January 1909
- Fate: Sold 1915

Soviet Union
- Name: Georgiy Sedov (Георгий Седов)
- Owner: Soviet Union government
- Port of registry: Archangelsk
- Acquired: 1915
- Out of service: 1967
- Fate: Scrapped in Hamburg by Eckhardt & Co.

General characteristics
- Tonnage: 1383 grt
- Displacement: 3056 tonnes
- Length: 78.6 m (257 ft 10 in)
- Beam: 10.9 m (35 ft 9 in)
- Draught: 6 m (19 ft 8 in)
- Installed power: 2,360 ihp
- Propulsion: Triple expansion steam engine, 2 boilers, 1-screw
- Speed: 12 knots

Georgiy Sedov (Russian: Георгий Седов) was a Soviet ice-breaker fitted with steam engines. She was originally the Newfoundland seal fishery support vessel Beothic, renamed after Russian captain and polar explorer Georgy Yakovlevich Sedov in 1915. She was the first Soviet drifting ice station, the culmination of a decade of high-latitude exploration.

== History ==
Beothic was built in 1908–09 at Glasgow and was engaged as a support vessel in sealing until her sale to the Imperial Russian Ministry of Commerce and Industry in 1915. Renamed Georgiy Sedov, she was inherited by the new Soviet government following the Russian Civil War.

In 1929 icebreaker Sedov went on the "High-latitude Government Expedition" to Franz Josef Land carrying Soviet scientists.

In the summer of 1937 icebreaker Sadko sailed from Murmansk. Her original goal was to sail to Henrietta, Zhokhow and Jeanette Islands, in the De Long group and carry out scientific research. The purpose of the expedition was to find out if the Northern Sea Route could be used for regular shipping and to explore the complex Nordenskiöld Archipelago. The Soviet naval authorities changed the plans and the ice-breaker was sent instead to help ships in distress in the Kara and Laptev Seas. The Sadko became trapped in fast ice at 75°17'N and 132°28'E in the region of the New Siberian Islands. Another two Soviet icebreakers, the Sedov and the Malygin which were in the same area researching the ice conditions, became trapped by sea ice as well and drifted helplessly. Owing to persistent bad weather conditions, part of the stranded crew and some of the scientists could only be rescued in April 1938. Only on August 28, 1938, could the icebreaker Yermak free two of the three ships at 83°4'N and 138°22'E. The third ship, the Sedov, had to be left to drift in the ice and was transformed into a scientific polar station.

Sedov kept drifting in the ice toward the North Pole, very much like Fridtjof Nansen's Fram had done in 1893–96. In doing so they achieved a record northern latitude in 1939. There were 15 crew aboard, led by Captain Konstantin Badygin and W. Kh. Buinitzki. The scientists aboard took 415 astronomical measurements, 78 electromagnetic observations, as well as 38 depth measurements by drilling the thick polar ice during their 812-day stay aboard the Sedov. They were freed between Greenland and Svalbard by the icebreaker Joseph Stalin, the biggest icebreaker of the Soviet fleet at that time, on January 18, 1940.

=== Fate ===
Withdrawn from service in 1967, Sedov was scrapped at Hamburg by Eckhardt & Co.

== See also ==
- Vladimir Wiese
