= Bren Smith =

North American aquaculturist

Bren Smith is an aquaculture professional and former commercial fisherman, best known for pioneering regenerative ocean farming and co-founding the non-profit GreenWave.

== Early life and career ==
Born in Maddox Cove, Newfoundland, Canada, Smith left school aged 14 to become a commercial fisherman, working on the Grand Banks and the Bering Sea.

After leaving commercial fishing and later the fish farming industry, he founded Thimble Island Ocean Farm on the Thimbles Islands in Long Island Sound. There, Smith designed and refined a vertical system for cultivating kelp and shellfish which became known as “3D ocean farming” and later regenerative ocean farming. He subsequently co-founded GreenWave to promote the aquaculture of kelp and shellfish, create blue jobs, and restore ocean ecosystems.

Smith graduated from Cornell Law School.

== Media and advocacy ==
Smith and his work have been featured by 60 Minutes, PBS NewsHour Brief But Spectacular, The New Yorker, NPR, The Wall Street Journal, the BBC, The Atlantic, Fast Company, Bon Appétit, and Saveur. His writing about fishing, farming, and food systems has appeared in The New York Times and on CNN.

Smith is profiled in documentary films and television programs including Leonardo DiCaprio’s HBO documentary Ice on Fire (2019), To Which We Belong (2021), The Ocean Solution (2022), Food and Country (2023), BBC’s Our Frozen Planet (2023), PBS documentary series A Brief History of the Future (2024), Food, Inc. 2 (2024), and Fork in the Road (2026).

In 2017, Smith’s TED Talk “The Least Deadliest Catch” detailed his journey from fisherman to ocean farmer. That same year, he delivered an E. F. Schumacher Lecture, organized by the Schumacher Center for a New Economics, entitled “Ecological Redemption: Ocean Farming in the Era of Climate Change”.

== Awards ==
In 2015, Smith’s model and GreenWave received the Buckminster Fuller Challenge for the multi-species ocean farming design, followed by the Index Award and Sustainia Award in 2017, the Prince Albert II of Monaco Foundation’s Climate Change Award in 2021 and the Curt Bergfors Food Planet Prize that same year.

In 2017, Smith was named one of Rolling Stone’s 25 People Shaping the Future, and his farming model was named one of Time's 25 Best Inventions of 2017.

In 2020, his memoir, Eat Like a Fish, won a James Beard Foundation Book Award.

Smith is also an Ashoka Fellow and an Echoing Green Climate Fellow.

== Books ==
Smith’s memoir, Eat Like a Fish: My Adventures as a Fisherman Turned Restorative Ocean Farmer, was published by Alfred A. Knopf in 2019 and received the 2020 James Beard Foundation Book Award in the Writing category. Paul Hawken described the book as “a mind bending look into an extraordinary world by a stunning and gifted storyteller.”
