= Petty Harbour Generating Station =

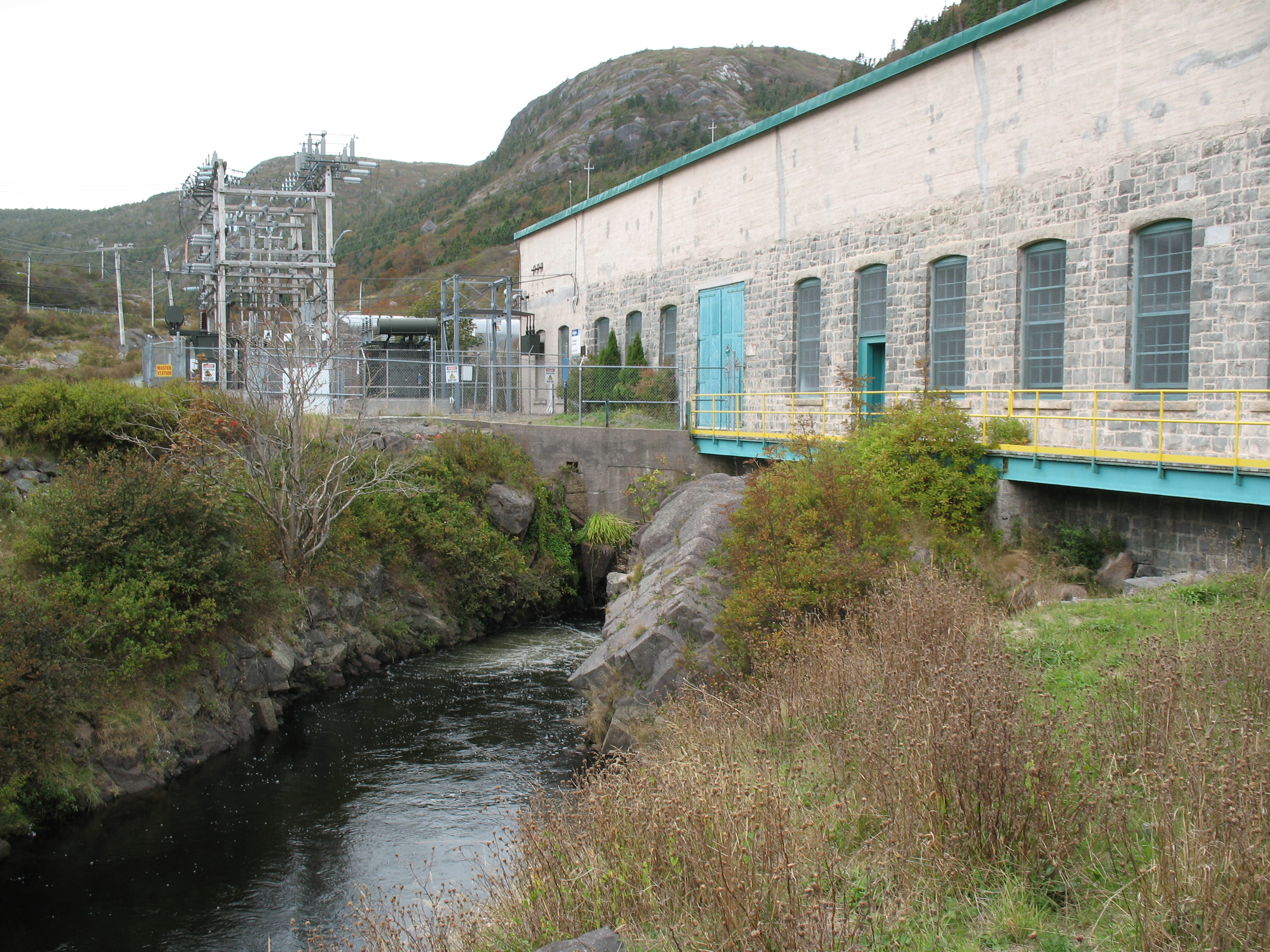
- Image of Petty Harbour Generating Station

- Location within Newfoundland and Labrador
- Official name: Petty Harbour Hydroelectric Development
- Location: Canada; Newfoundland and Labrador
- Coordinates: 47.465395°N 52.7122622°W
- Purpose: Power
- Status: Operational
- Construction began: 1898
- Owner: Newfoundland Power

Dam and spillways
- Type of dam: Earth fill dam

Power Station
- Operators: Newfoundland Light and Power Company Ltd.
- Hydraulic head: 57.9 m (190 ft)
- Turbines: 3
- Installed capacity: 5.3 MW
- Annual generation: 18 GWh

The Petty Harbour Hydro Electric Generating Station is a hydroelectric generating station in Petty Harbour–Maddox Cove, Newfoundland and Labrador. It was constructed in 1898 and it was the first hydroelectric generating station in Newfoundland. It was built by the St. John's Street Railway Company, a company established by Robert Reid. Operation commenced on 19 April 1900.

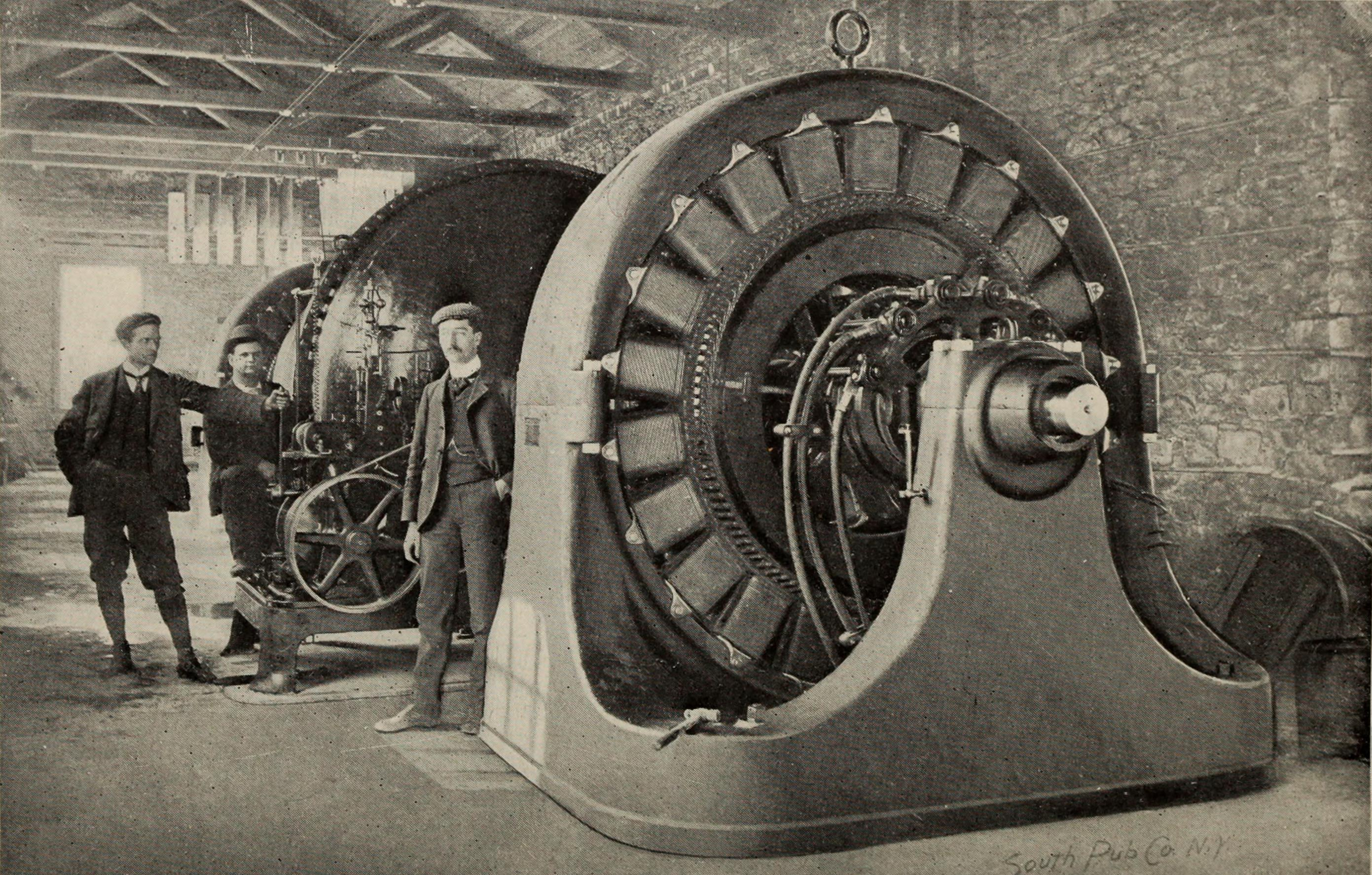
Original Turbine at Petty Harbour 1900

In 1920 Reid renamed the company the St. John's Light and Power Company. On 7 February 1921, an avalanche destroyed 23 m (75 ft) of the wooden penstock that carried water from the dam to the generating station, cutting off all electrical power to St. John's for almost five days. Then, in 1924, St. John's Street Railway Company was bought by Newfoundland Light and Power Company Ltd therefore changing ownership of the dam.

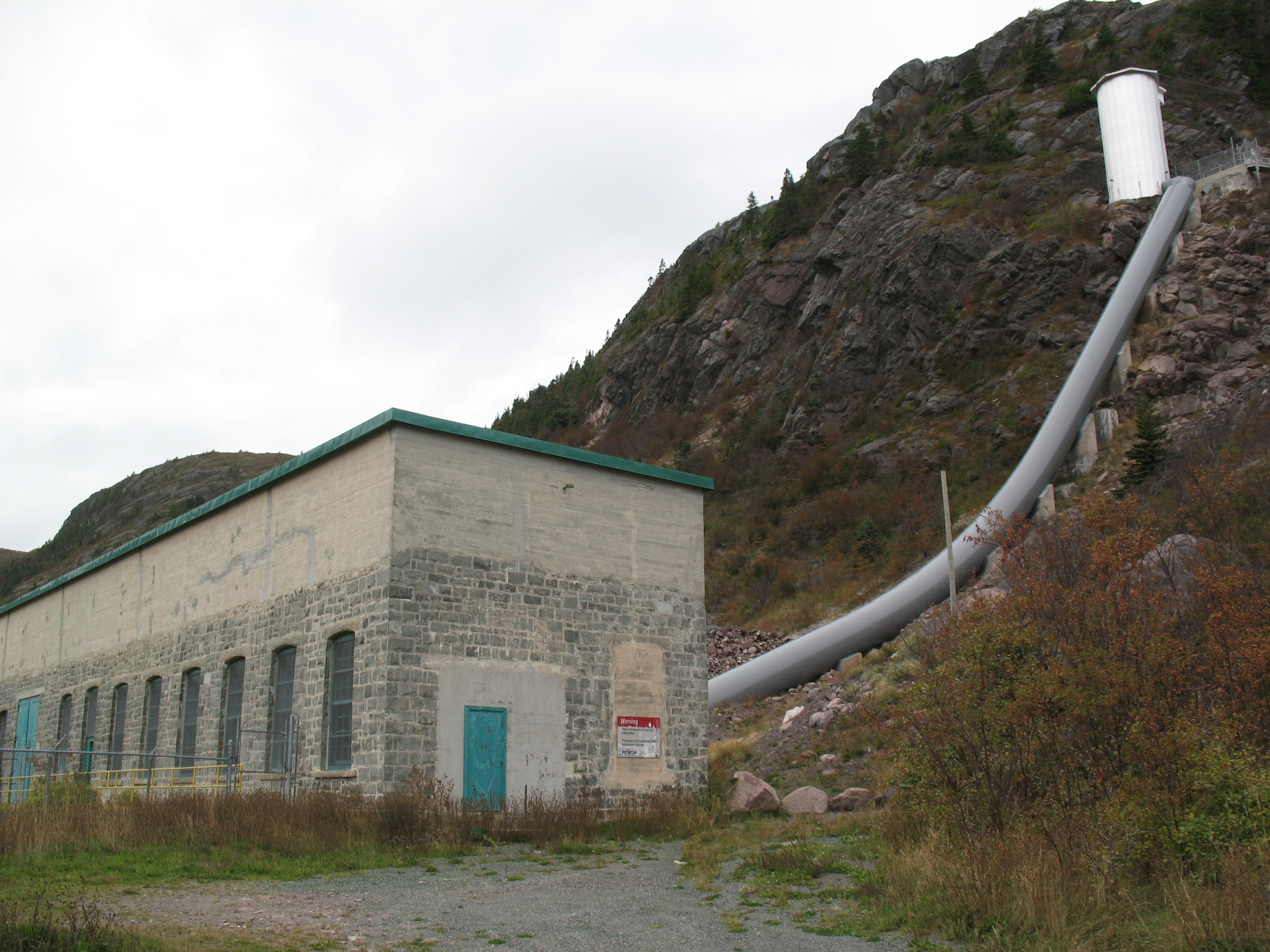
Gull Hill intake on Petty Harbour station

On 1 May 1978, the plant was entered in the Canadian Engineering Heritage Record as a model reflecting progressive adaptation to emerging technology, and as of 2012, it remains as one of the few plants of its type still in active service.

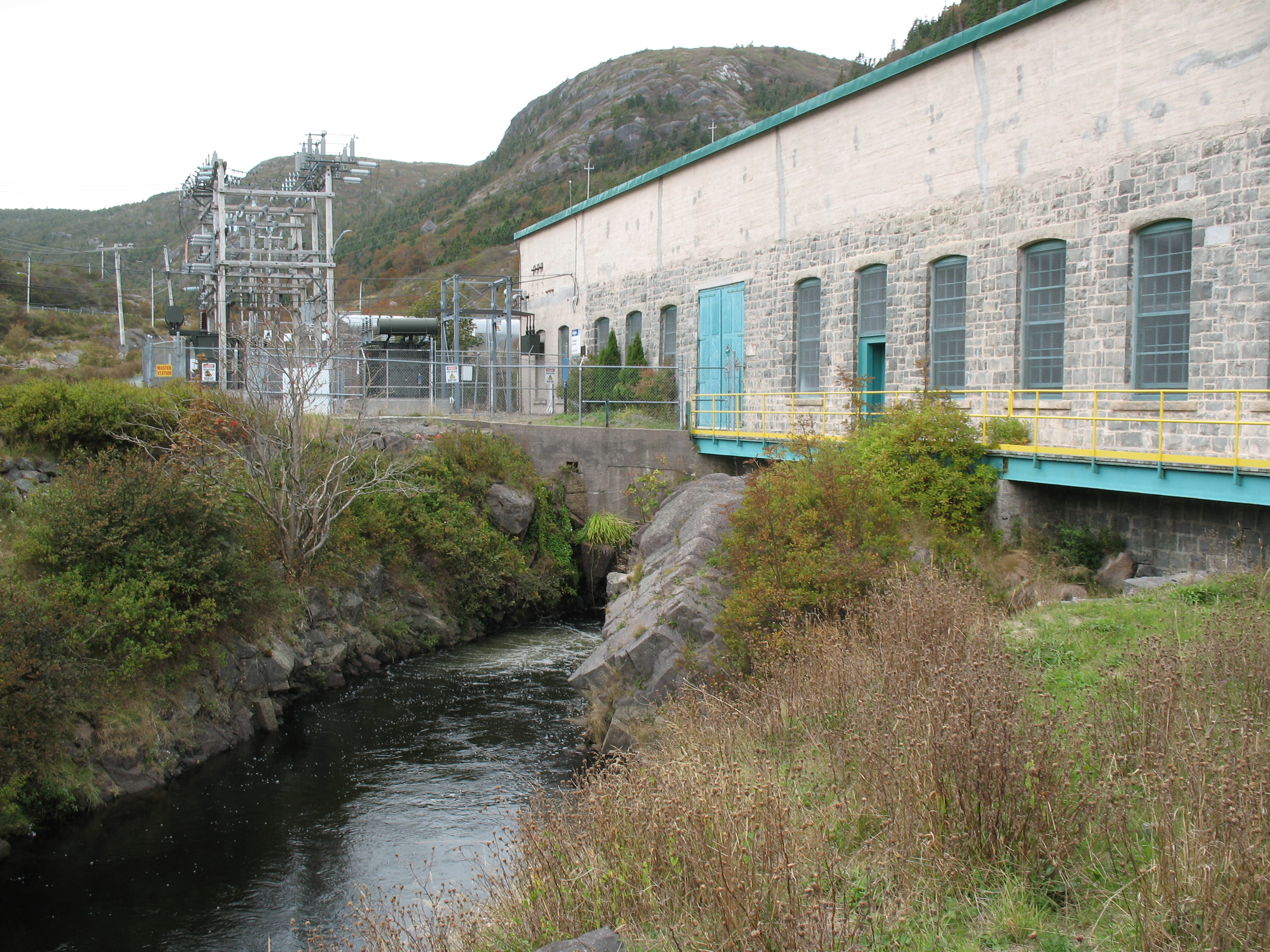
Front of generating station at Petty Harbour

== Technical Information ==
=== Equipment ===
==== Turbines ====
===== Unit 2 =====
Originally installed in 1900

Victor type (early Francis turbine): 1.4 MW, Manufactured by Stillwell, Bierce & Smith Vaille Co.

Replaced in 1908 with: Horizontal Francis, 1.57 MW, Manufactured by Voith

===== Unit 1 =====
Originally installed in 1902

Inward-flow Girard type (impulse turbine):1.4 MW, Manufactured by Stillwell, Bierce & Smith Vaille Co.

Replaced in 1912 with:

Horizontal Francis: 1.57 MW, Manufactured by Voith

===== Unit 3 =====
Installed 1926

Horizontal Francis: 2.05 MW, Manufactured by Armstrong Whitworth

==== Generators ====
===== Unit 2 =====
Installed in 1900: 3-phase: 60 Hertz, 550 volts

Manufactured by Westinghouse

Replaced in 1926 with: 3-phase, 60 Hertz, 2,300 volts

Manufactured by General Electric

===== Unit 1 =====
Installed in 1902: 3-phase, 60 Hertz, 550 volts

Manufactured by Westinghouse

Rewound in 1926 to 2,300 volts

===== Unit 3 =====
Installed in 1926: 3-phase, 60 Hertz, 2,300 volts

Manufactured by General Electric

== Construction ==
=== Powerhouse ===
48.8 metres long by 7.3 metres wide by 4.9 metres high Masonry construction

=== Penstock ===
Original:
1,057 metres long, 2.4-meter by 2.4-meter cross-section wooden flume
112.2 metres long, 2.4-meter by 2.4-meter cross-section rock tunnel
115.2 metres long, 2-meter-diameter steel penstock
Replacements:
1926: 975-metre-long, 2.3-meter-diameter wood stave penstock
1953: Steel penstock (surge tank riser) replaced with 2.3-metre-diameter steel pipe
1999: Lower 740.7 metres of penstock replaced with 2.3-metre-diameter steel pipe
2021: Remainder of penstock replaced with 2.3-metre-diameter steel pipe
Intake Structure:
Concrete with steel gate and lift (integral to forebay dam)

== Dams & Reservoirs ==
=== Forebay ===
In 1900, rockfill with timber facing. Replaced in 1926 with concrete gravity. Steel anchors added in 1992. 9.1-meter maximum height.

=== Bay Bulls Big Pond ===
Zoned earthfill (rebuilt 1998–1999) Concrete outlet conduit.

=== Cochrane Pond ===
Earthfill with concrete overflow spillway and timber crib outlet.

== Tailrace ==
Unlined canal excavated in rock 37 metres long.
