= Petty Harbour–Maddox Cove =

- Town
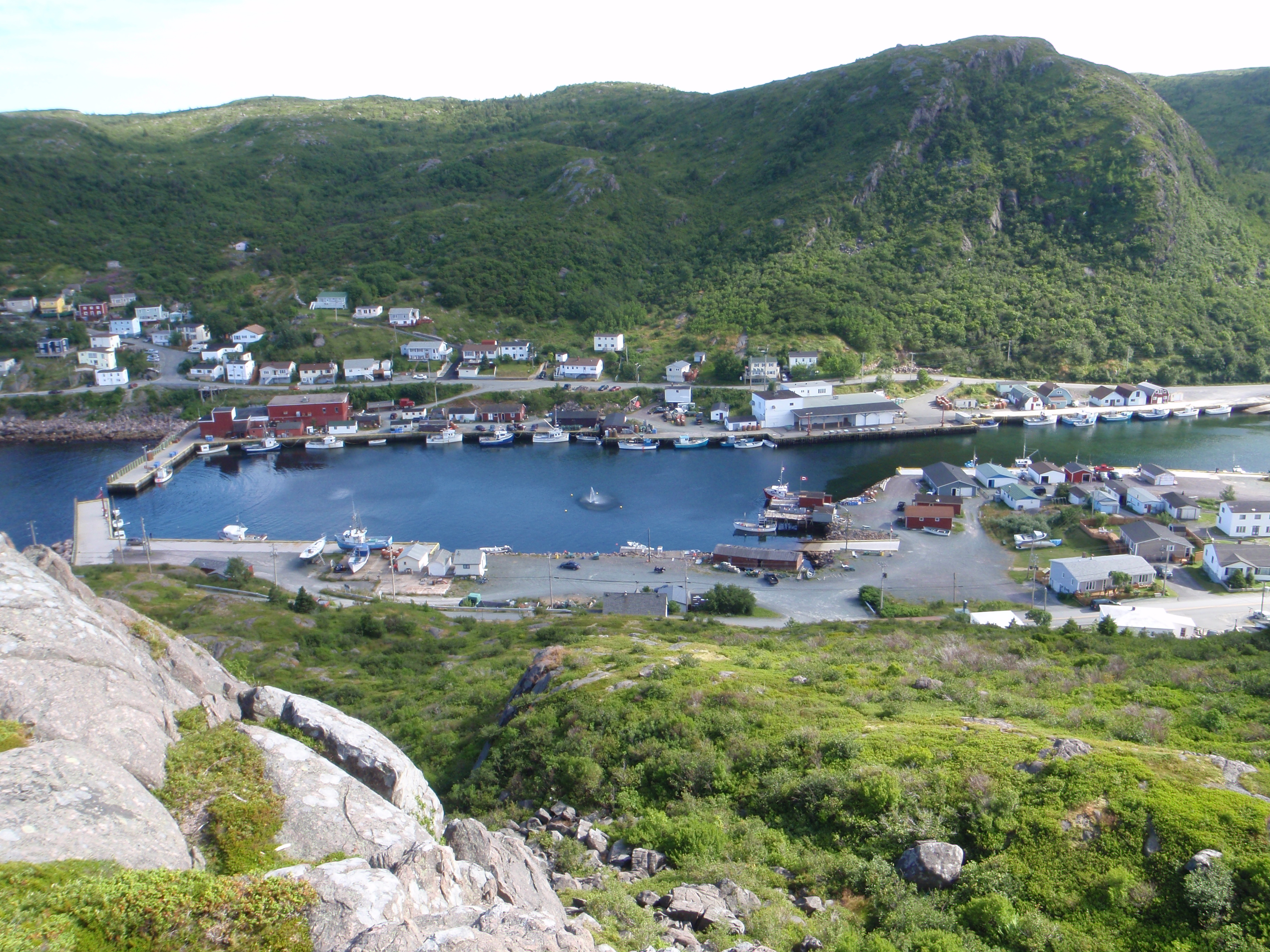

- Location in Newfoundland
- Coordinates: 47°28′N 52°43′W
- Country: Canada
- Province: Newfoundland and Labrador

Area
  - Land: 4.54 km^{2} (1.75 sq mi)

Population (2021)
  - Total: 947
  - Density: 211.5/km^{2} (548/sq mi)
- Time zone: UTC-3:30 (Newfoundland Time)
  - Summer (DST): UTC-2:30 (Newfoundland Daylight)
- Area code: 709
- Highways: Route 11
- Website: www.pettyharbour.ca

Petty Harbour–Maddox Cove is a town of approximately 950 people located on the eastern shore of the Avalon Peninsula in the province of Newfoundland and Labrador, Canada. It is nestled deep in the heart of Motion Bay about 10 kilometres (6.2 mi) south of St. John's. The present town is approximately 200 years old, though the site has been continuously occupied by Europeans (Beothuk history at the site is tens of thousands of years old) since at least 1598. During King William's War, the village was raided by French forces in the Avalon Peninsula Campaign.

Petty Harbour–Maddox Cove is the site of the Petty Harbour Generating Station, the first hydroelectric generating station in Newfoundland and Labrador.

== Etymology ==
The name Petty Harbour is the anglicized form of the French name Petit Havre, which means 'small harbour'. It was first settled by French colonists.

== Demographics ==
In the 2021 Census of Population conducted by Statistics Canada, Petty Harbour–Maddox Cove had a population of 947 living in 381 of its 408 total private dwellings, a change of −1.4% from its 2016 population of 960. With a land area of 4.4 km^{2} (1.7 sq mi), it had a population density of 215.2/km^{2} (557.4/sq mi) in 2021.

== Notable people ==
- Alan Doyle, lead singer of the band Great Big Sea
- Bren Smith, founder of GreenWave
- Perry Chafe, Canadian TV writer, producer and bestselling author

== See also ==
- List of cities and towns in Newfoundland and Labrador
- Petty Harbour Generating Station
- Great Big Sea
- SS Regulus
