= GreenWave =

North American nonprofit

Bren Smith of GreenWave explains his farming methods, including the symbiotic relationship kelp has with other seafood he grows.

GreenWave is a North American nonprofit focused on the development of regenerative farming techniques for aquaculture, called "3D ocean farming", to create blue carbon. Their focus is on developing polyculture practices for farming shellfish and seaweeds and kelps. These practices include using many layers of the water column, emulating high activity water ecosystems like reefs, to increase productivity and biomass.

The organization focuses on developing globally accessible techniques for this kind of farming. As of 2019, they had a waitlist of over 4,000 farmers in 20 countries needing support in starting such farms. Starting such a farm usually costs between US$20,000–50,000. The nonprofit was created by Bren Smith to spread methods first developed on his Thimble Island Ocean Farm in Long Island Sound. Emily Stengal is the co-founder and deputy director of the non-profit.

In 2015, the organization's 3D ocean farming method won the Buckminster Fuller Institute's Fuller Challenge. The organization also won a 2017 The Index Project prize.

== See also ==
- Algaculture
- Integrated multi-trophic aquaculture
