= George H. Middleton =

Scottish-Canadian engineer

George H. Middleton (fl. 1870 in Strathmeigle, Scotland – 1892) was a Canadian engineer, who had worked on as a sub-contractor of the Canadian Pacific Railway and partner to Robert G. Reid in the building of the Newfoundland Railway.

Middleton came to Canada in the 1870s with two of his brothers to work on the construction of Canadian Pacific Railway. He had met Reid while working on the CPR and they eventually became partners. Middleton's brother Alexander participated in the surveying of the route for the Newfoundland Railway in 1889.

Both Middleton and Reid had contracted with the Whiteway government of Newfoundland on June 18, 1890 to build sections of the Railway. Sometime in 1892 he had a falling out with Reid and dissolved the partnership. Reid went on to complete the Railway contract.

== See also ==
- Newfoundland Railway
- List of people of Newfoundland and Labrador
