= Malygin (1912 icebreaker) =

Russian and later Soviet icebreaker launched in 1912 and lost in 1940

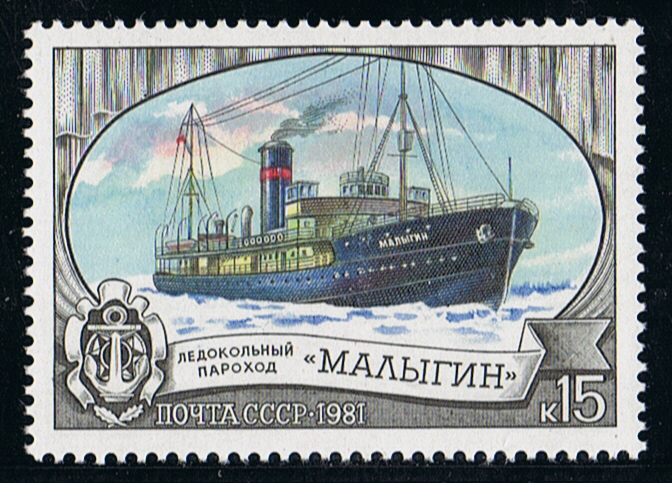
- Postage stamp image

History
- Name: Malygin
- Namesake: Stepan Malygin
- Owner: Soviet Union
- Port of registry: Murmansk
- Builder: Napier and Miller, Glasgow
- Yard number: 181
- Launched: 9 December 1911
- Completed: February 1912
- Acquired: 12 February 1912 (Reid Newfoundland Company); 1915 (Imperial Russian Government)
- Fate: Sunk in a storm on 27/28 October 1940

General characteristics
- Tonnage: 1,553 gross register
- Displacement: 3200 tonnes
- Length: 78.9 m
- Beam: 14.2 m
- Propulsion: One 3-cylinder triple-expansion engine
- Speed: 15 knots
- Crew: 98

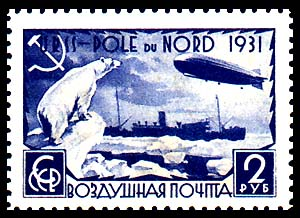
The Malygin and LZ 127 Graf Zeppelin on a Soviet stamp (1931)

The steamship Malygin (Малыгин) was a Soviet icebreaker of 3,200 tonnes displacement. She was named after Stepan Malygin.

== Design and construction ==
The icebreaking passenger-cargo ship was built in 1911-12 as Bruce for the Reid Newfoundland Company for their mail service between Newfoundland and Canada, replacing the previous Bruce of 1897, which had been wrecked on 24 March 1911. S.S. Bruce was built at Yard No.181 at Napier and Miller's shipyard at Old Kilpatrick on the River Clyde, Scotland and was launched on 9 December 1911. As built, the ship measured 1,553 GRT and 663 NRT, and was 250.4 feet (76.32 m) long, with a beam of 36.2 feet (11.03 m) and a depth of 23.1 feet 1 inch (7.07 m). She was powered by a triple expansion steam engine made by John G. Kincaid & Company and rated at 3,000 horsepower and driving a single screw propeller. The hull was specially strengthened for working in ice.

On her delivery voyage, Bruce arrived at St. John's, Newfoundland on 12 February 1912, seven days, 21 hours and five minutes from Greenock, Scotland.

== Commercial service ==
Bruce was registered at St. John's with Official Number 129921, and sailed on 13 February 1912 on her first service voyage to Sydney, Cape Breton Island, where she proved to be an efficient icebreaker.

Two months later, as survivors from the sinking of Titanic were still en route to New York, newspapers there published a detailed account of the sinking, claiming that it came from radio contacts between Bruce and ships in the rescue area; the circulation-boosting report on 17 April was found to be a complete fabrication.

In March 1913, during a particularly severe ice season in the Gulf of St. Lawrence, she was stuck for a week near her regular destination port of Sydney.

From that year, Bruce, together with the new RMS Lintrose, maintained a daily service between the terminus of the Newfoundland Railway at Port aux Basques and Sydney.

== Russian Empire ==
At the outbreak of the First World War in July 1914, the Russian Imperial Government needed to improve access through Arkhangelsk by delaying the annual icing-up of the port. Two icebreakers were purchased from Canada, the Government's Earl Grey (renamed Kanada) and Reid's Lintrose (renamed Sadko), and successfully delayed the end of the navigation season from mid-November until the beginning of January 1915. To secure this improvement, Bruce was additionally purchased in July 1915 and renamed Solovei Budemirovich or Solovey Budimirovich (Соловей Будимирович). (Note: Solovey Budimirovich (Соловей Будимирович) is a rich merchant prince in old Russian epic bylina poetry; not to be confused with Solovey Razboynik (Солове́й-Разбо́йник), who shares the same forename, meaning nightingale.) In addition to icebreaking, Solovey Budmirovich provided coastal supply service between Murmansk and Belomorsk.

Towards the end of the civil war in north Russia, and after intervening Western forces had departed, the commander of local White forces, General Yevgeny Miller, sent Solovey Budimirovich to Igarka, attempting to source winter food for Arkhangelsk. By 30 January 1920 the ship, with 85 crew and passengers, was trapped in ice 50 nautical miles short of Igarka, and drifting north with ice, eventually into the Kara Sea, a distance of some 1,000 miles. No rescue was organised from Arkhangelsk and, when the Bolsheviks entered Arkhangelsk on 21 February 1920, they found that General Miller had fled to the west on the only available full icebreaker,Kozma Minin. By late March the situation on Solovey Budimirovich was desperate, with coal exhausted and boilers fuelled only with wooden barrels, food very limited, and radio communications cut to weekly, to conserve batteries. At the same time, the new Russian government was seeking help from Britain in the form of the icebreaker Sviatogor which had taken by British forces during the civil war and commissioned into the Royal Navy. It was agreed that Sviatogor would be loaned to the Norwegian Government for a rescue mission, under the leadership of Arctic explorer Otto Sverdrup, which reached the trapped ship on 19 June 1920, by which time she had drifted some 1000 miles in the ice.

== Malygin ==
Solovey Budimirovich was renamed Malygin in August 1921. On her maiden voyage, she led the newly-founded Floating Marine Research Institute Plavmornin (now called the Nikolai M. Knipovich Polar Research Institute of Marine Fisheries and Oceanography) to study the Arctic Ocean and adjacent seas, rivers, islands and coastal areas.

With other ships, including the icebreaker Krasin in 1928, Malygin took part in the search for the Umberto Nobile's dirigible expedition. On this voyage, Junkers pilot Mikhail Babushkin (Михаил Бабушкин) flew several aerial searches over the Arctic in search of the airship.

In July 1931, Vladimir Wiese led an expedition on Malygin to Franz Josef Land and the northern part of the Kara Sea, with Captain D.T. Chertkhov in command. Other members included technicians (amongst them Umberto Nobile) whose mission was to locate a suitable place for a Soviet floatplane base in Franz Josef Land. During this expedition the German airship Graf Zeppelin made a memorable rendezvous with Malygin at Bukhta Tikhaya on Hooker Island, Franz Josef Land, on July 27, 1931.

On 1 January 1933 she ran aground in Grønfjorden near Barentsburg, Spitzbergen while bound from Murmansk to Barentsburg. Malygin was refloated and towed to Arkhangelsk, where repairs were completed by May 1933.

In 1937-38, she took part in drifting expedition together with icebreakers Sadko (her sister ship, the former Lintrose) and Sedov.

The Malygin sank in a storm near Cape Nizhny, Kamchatka on 27/28 October 1940 with all 98 people on board while returning from a hydrographic expedition. Owing to lack of information about the disaster, Malygin was listed in Lloyd's Register until 1960.

== See also ==
- Vladimir Wiese
- Mikhail Babushkin(Михаил Бабушкин)
