= Reid Newfoundland Company =

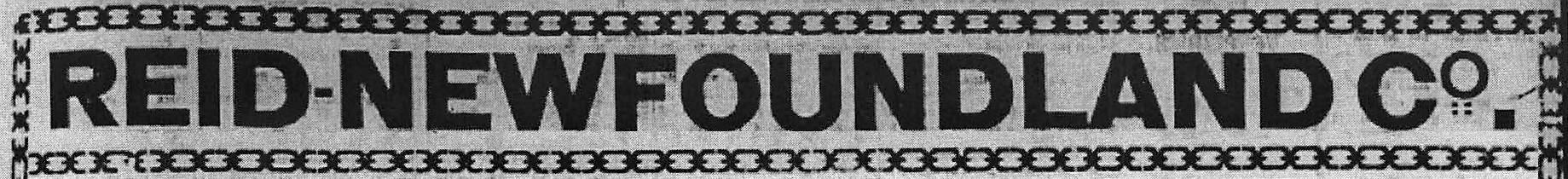
- Type: Private
- Industry: Rail transport Market pulp Wood products Shipping, transportation
- Founded: St. John's, Newfoundland (1901)
- Founder: Sir Robert Gillespie Reid
- Defunct: 1923
- Headquarters: St. John's, Newfoundland
- Key people: Sir Robert Gillespie Reid
- Revenue: Not reported

The Reid Newfoundland Company was incorporated in September 1901 and was the operator of the Newfoundland Railway across the island from 1901 to 1923. For a time it was the largest landowner in the Dominion of Newfoundland, today the modern Canadian province of Newfoundland and Labrador. The company was founded by Sir Robert Gillespie Reid of Scotland, a businessman who had interests in the development of the pulp and paper industry and mining industry. The company was also the owner and operator of the coastal boat service, known as the Alphabet Fleet, the telegraph line and the electrical service in St. John's.

== Beginnings ==
The company had its beginnings in 1890 when the Newfoundland Government under William Whiteway wanted to build a railway line from Whitbourne to Halls Bay at $15,600 per mile ($9,700/km). Both Reid and George H. Middleton had contracted to build it but Middleton had pulled out in 1892. To ensure that the line was going to be completed to Port aux Basques, Reid had negotiated with the Newfoundland Government to operate the railway for 10 years. As a condition of operating the Railway, he was to be compensated with 5,000 acres (2,023 ha) of Crown Land 1 per mile (0.62/km) operated. Although forested land was much more valuable to Reid, if the area along the line was barren or boggy, he was allowed to select other land of his choosing.

In 1896, the company established the St. John's Street Railway Company and given permission to build the Petty Harbour Hydro Plant to supply power to it.

In 1896, he negotiated another contract, the Railway Contract of 1896, to build the railway from Whitbourne to Harbour Grace which gave him ownership of the entire railway (including the line to Harbour Grace) for 50 years and again 5,000 acres (2,023 ha) of land for every 1 per mile (0.62/km) built. The total of his land holdings was more than 6,500 square miles (17,000 km^{2}) of forested land. The contract also allowed Reid to purchase the St. John's dry-dock from the government for $325,000.

== See also ==
- Alphabet Fleet
- Newfoundland Railway
- Railway Coastal Museum
- Terra Transport
