= Robert Gillespie Reid =

Scottish-Canadian railway businessman (1842–1908)

Sir Robert Gillespie Reid
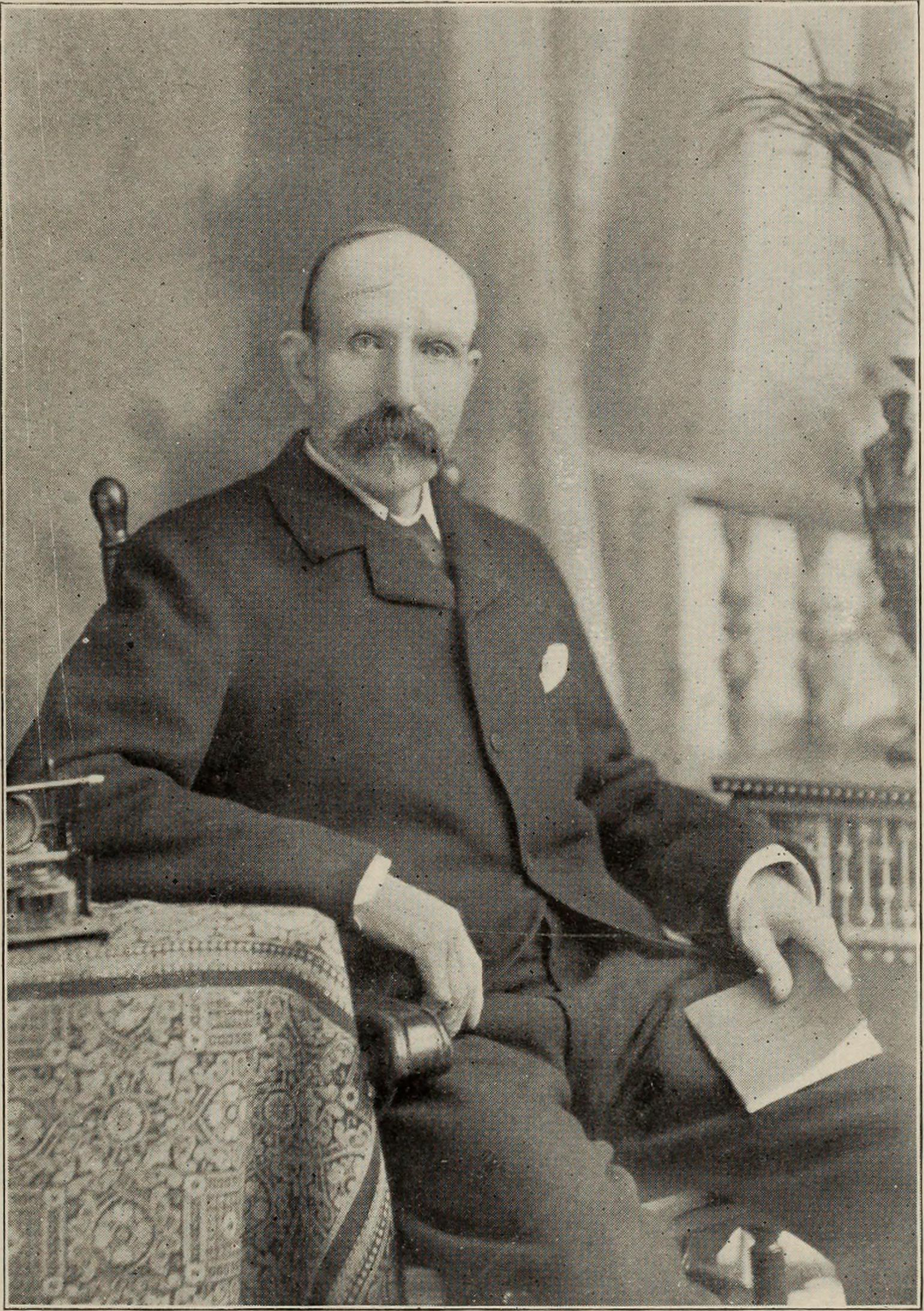
- R. G. Reid
- Born: 12 October 1842; Coupar Angus, Perthshire, Scotland
- Died: 3 June 1908 (aged 65); Montreal, Quebec, Canada
- Occupation: Businessman
- Known for: Reid Newfoundland Company

Sir Robert Gillespie Reid (12 October 1842 – 3 June 1908) was a Scottish railway contractor most famous for building large railway bridges in Canada, the United States, and Newfoundland. Founder of Reid Newfoundland Company, from 1889 until his death, he built, owned, and operated the Newfoundland Railway.

== Early career ==
As a young man, Reid spent a few years in Australia mining gold. In 1871, Reid settled in North America, where he began his career as a contractor. He built one section of the Canadian Pacific Railway, and was responsible for the erection of the international bridge over the Niagara River, the international railway bridge over the Rio Grande and the Lachine bridge over the St. Lawrence.

== Newfoundland ==
Reid brought his business ventures to Newfoundland in 1889. In 1893, he signed a contract with the government of Newfoundland, and as president of the Reid Newfoundland Company he built the railway from Whitbourne to Port aux Basques. The contract specified he work the line for ten years. In return he received a large grant of land.

In 1898, he further contracted to work all the railways in Newfoundland for fifty years on condition that at the end of this time they should become his property. This bargain, which included other matters such as steamers, docks and telegraphs, was extraordinarily favourable to Reid, who, by further enormous grants of land, became one of the largest landed proprietors in the world. Public opinion was aroused against the deal, and at first the governor, Sir Herbert Murray, refused to ratify it.

After the premier, James Spearman Winter, had been replaced by Robert Bond, the terms of the contract were revised, being made more favourable to Newfoundland, and Reid's interests were transferred to a company, the Reid Newfoundland Company, of which he was the first president. The Reid Newfoundland Company owned and operated the Whitbourne to Port aux Basques railway for 33 years and also ran the coastal boat and telegraph services on the island. Reid was knighted in 1907.

== Legacy ==
There is a $3,500 Robert Gillespie Reid Memorial Scholarship available for Memorial University of Newfoundland.
