= East Siberian Lowland =

Plain in Siberia, Russia

East Siberian Lowland Восточно-Сибирская низменность
- Plain
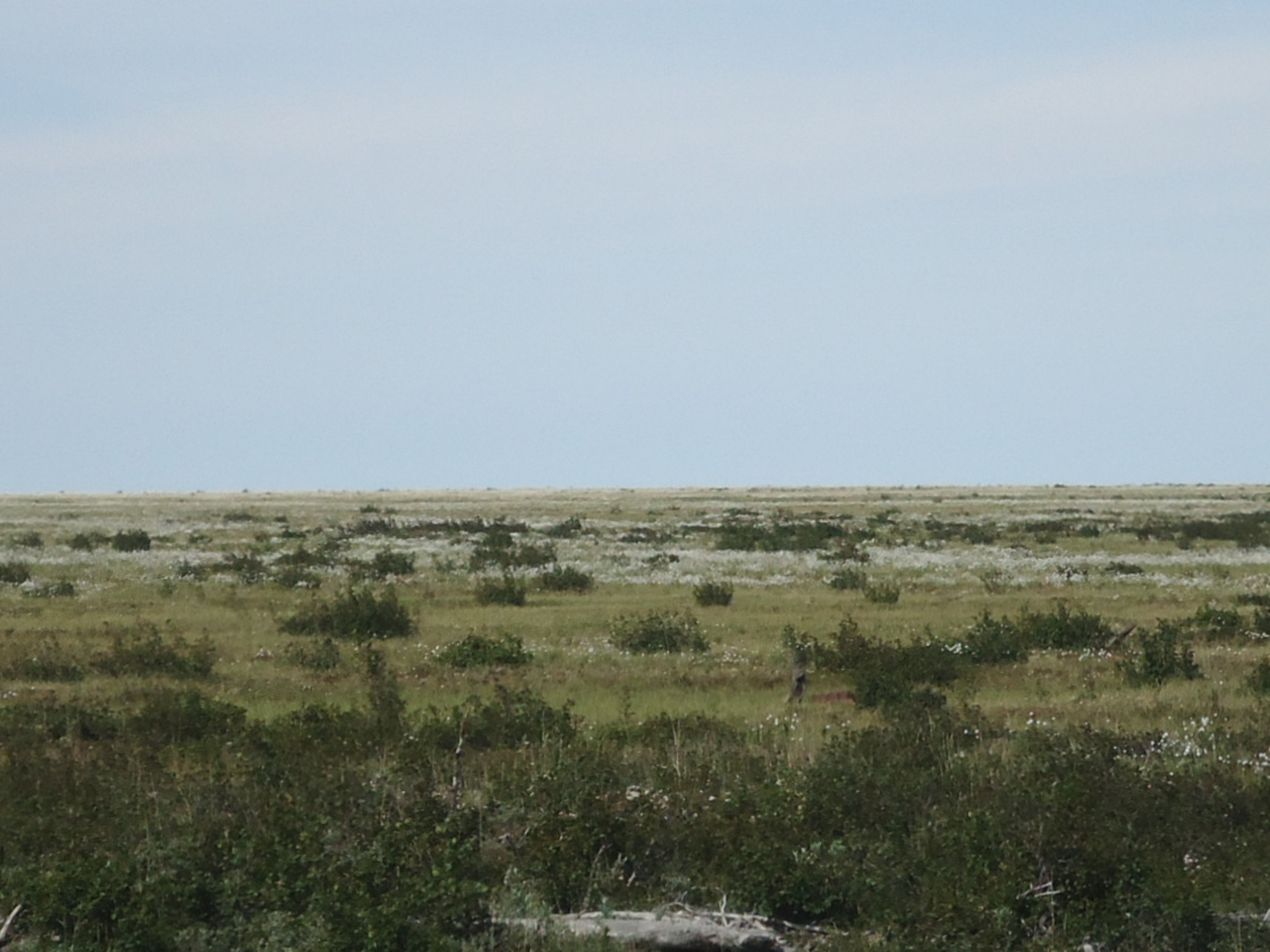
- Tundra in the Ust-Yansky District.

- East Siberian Lowland (Far Eastern Federal District)
- Coordinates: 72°N 149°E
- Location: Yakutia, Russia
- Part of: Siberia

Area
  - Total: 1,100,000 km^{2} (420,000 sq mi)
- Elevation: 0 meters (0 ft) to 100 meters (330 ft) on the plain

The East Siberian Lowland (Russian: Восточно-Сибирская низменность, romanized: Vostochno-Sibirskaya nizmennost), also known as Yana-Kolyma Lowland (Russian: Яно-Колымская низменность, romanized: Yano-Kolymskaya nizmennost), is a vast plain in North-eastern Siberia, Russia. The territory of the lowland is one of the Great Russian Regions. Administratively, it is a part of the Sakha Republic (Yakutia).

Owing to the harshness of the climate the East Siberian Lowland is largely unpopulated. Inhabited centers are small and widely scattered. Andryushkino, Argakhtakh, Chokurdakh, Nizhneyansk, Olenegorsk, Russkoye Ustye, Srednekolymsk, and Zyryanka are among the few towns in the area.

== Geography ==
The East Siberian Lowland is an extensive region located in the far north-east of Siberia. It is roughly triangular in shape and is about 1,300 kilometres (810 mi) from east to west and 1,100 kilometres (680 mi) from north to south, gradually rising and narrowing southwards, deeper into the continent. Except for a small section at the southern end the lowland region lies almost wholly north of the Polar Circle. The lowland includes the Yana-Indigirka, Kolyma and Aby lowlands, vast alluvial plains, swampy and dotted with thousands of lakes. These smaller lowland units are limited by residual ridges which break the generally flat relief, including the Kyundyulyun, Polousny Range, Ulakhan-Sis, Kondakov Plateau and Suor Uyata, as well as by isolated hills rising from the tundra, such as the Kisilyakh-Tas by the Alazeya. Most of the kigilyakhs of Yakutia are found in these elevated areas of the East Siberian Lowland.

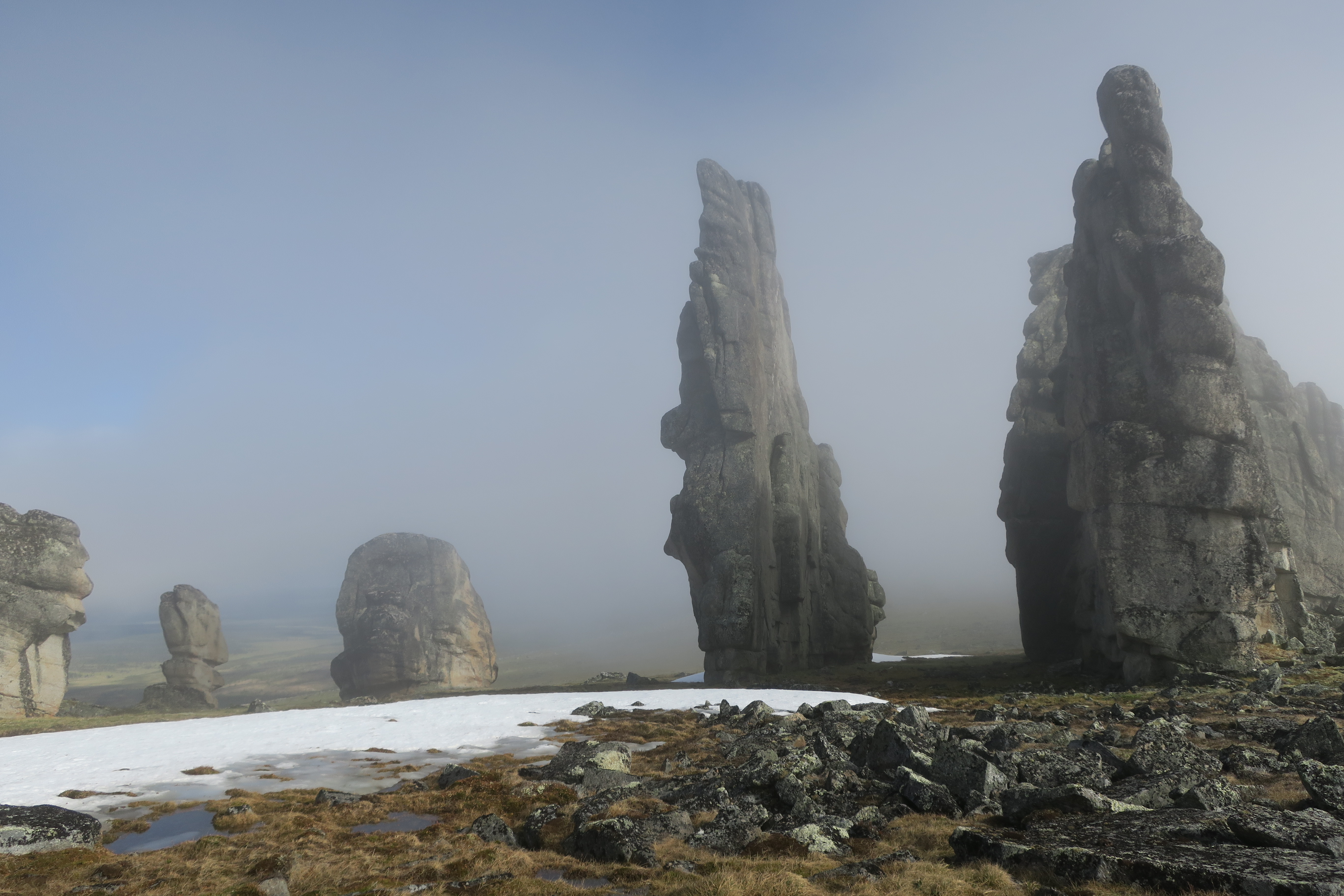
In the lowland between the Yana and Indigirka lies the Ulakhan-Sis Range, famous for its kigilyakh rock formations

To the north the East Siberian Lowland is bound by shallow marginal seas of the Arctic Ocean, the Laptev Sea and the East Siberian Sea. It includes the large New Siberian Islands and the smaller Medvezhy Islands, which form a continuum with the Eastern Siberian continental lowland region. To the west, south and southwest the lowland is limited by the East Siberian Mountains, including the Verkhoyansk Range, the Chersky Range and their foothills, as well as by the Alazeya Plateau, and to the east by the western end of the ranges of the Anadyr and the Yukaghir Highlands.

The lowlands are crossed by slowly meandering rivers flowing mostly northwards. The main ones are the Yana, Indigirka and Kolyma and their tributaries, as well as the smaller Omoloy, Alazeya, Sundrun and Khroma rivers. Except for the very large ones, most of the rivers of the lowland freeze to the bottom in the winter.

Continuous permafrost is prevalent in the East Siberian Lowlands, and permafrost-related formations such as alas thermokarst depressions and baydzharakh mounds are common throughout the region.

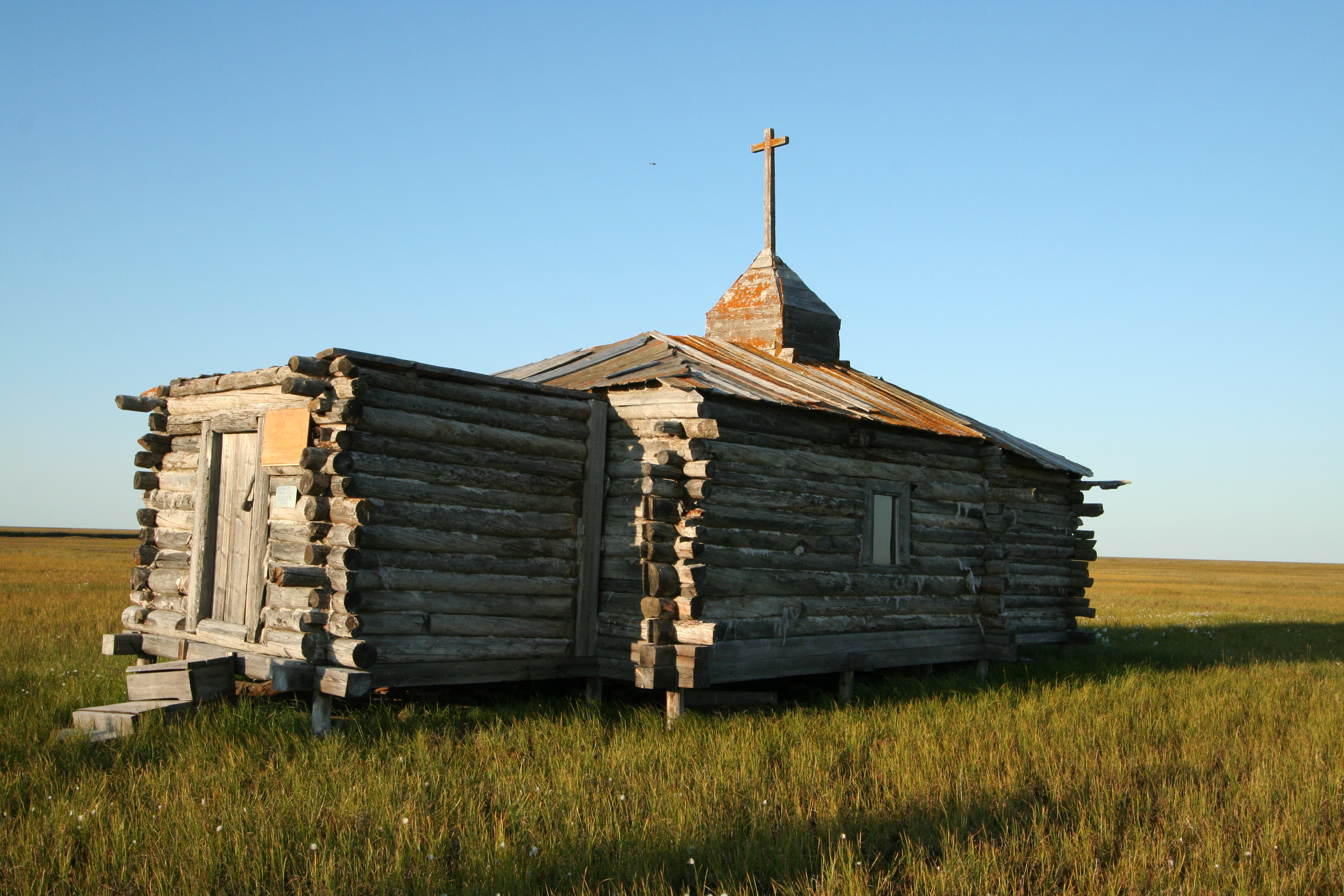
A church in Russkoye Ustye with the flat lowland tundra landscape in the background.

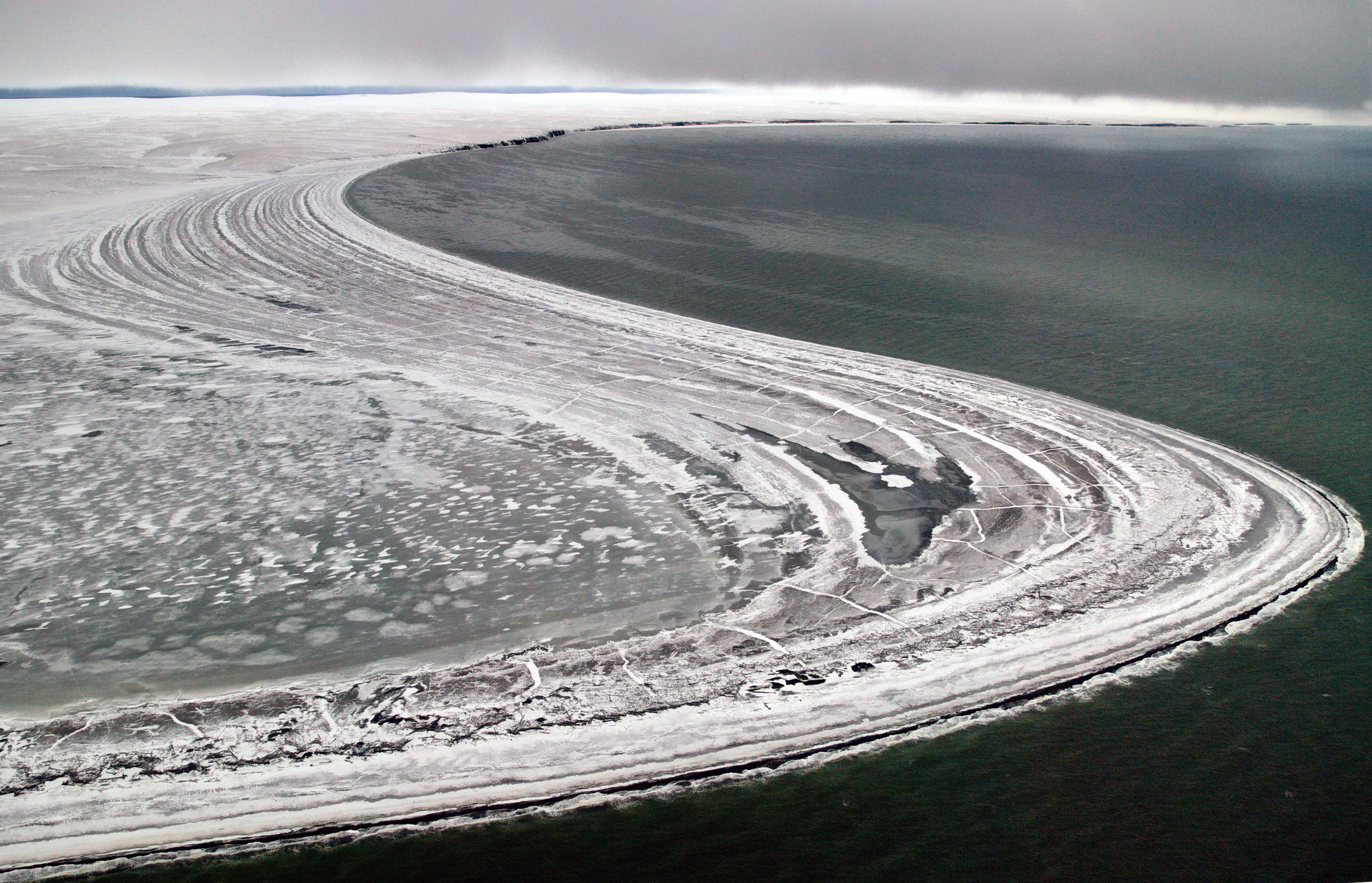
View of the shore of Belkovsky Island.

== Geology ==
Geologically the lowland is mainly composed of sediments of marine origin. these date back to the time when the area was occupied by the Verkhoyansk Sea, an ancient sea which took up most of the basin of the present-day Yana River and the upper reaches of the Indigirka in the Permian period. The Verkhoyansk Sea was located at the eastern edge of the Siberian Craton. As centuries went by, most of the area became gradually filled with the alluvial deposits of modern rivers.

== Climate, flora and fauna ==
The climate prevailing in the lowland is subarctic and severe, characterized by long, very cold winters. The average temperature in January is −32 °C (−26 °F) by the seashore and −36 °C (−33 °F) inland. In July the average temperature stays below 10 °C (50 °F) by the seashore, which prohibits tree growth and enables the tundra climate. Moving further inland, the chilling effect of the cold sea declines, enabling the Siberian landmass to heat up summer temperatures. In Srednekolymsk, located in the southern parts of the lowland, July temperatures reaches 13.9 °C (57.0 °F) which enables tree growth.

Most of the lowland is covered by tundra. Only at the southern end in the upper Kolyma River basin there is a region where larch taiga can grow.

There are wild reindeer herds in the Sundrun River that have a yearly migration pattern. The total reindeer population of the East Siberian Lowland, however, is small when compared with other areas, such as the Canadian Arctic. Rivers and lakes are abundant in fish, such as Arctic char (golets), Siberian vendace, chir, East Siberian grayling, muksun, nelma and omul. In the summer the wetlands are home to large populations of migratory birds, including the Siberian crane, Brent goose, Bewick's swan and the spectacled eider.

== See also ==
- List of ecoregions in Russia
- Northeast Siberian coastal tundra
- Yedoma
