= Kytalyk National Park =

National park of Russia

- (Russian: Кыталык)
- IUCN category II (national park)
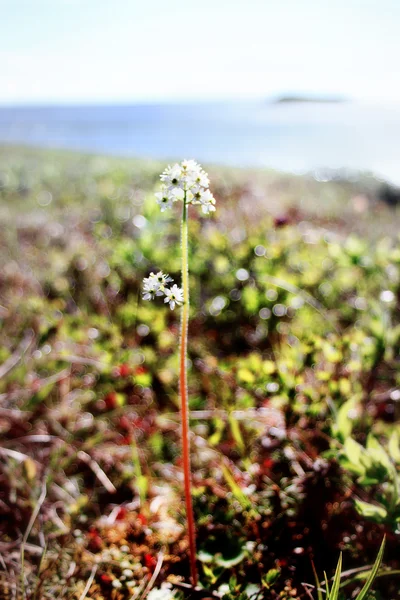
- In Kytalyk Wildlife Reserve

- Location within Russia
- Location: Allaikhovsky District, Sakha, Russia
- Nearest city: Chokurdakh
- Coordinates: 70°51′N 147°51′E
- Area: 1,885,554 hectares (4,659,305 acres; 18,856 km^{2}; 7,280 sq mi)
- Established: September 11, 2020
- Governing body: FGBU "Kytalyk"
- Website: https://npkytalyk.ru/

Kytalyk National Park (Russian: Национальный парк «Кыталык») is a protected area for the Arctic breeding grounds of migratory birds on the East Asian–Australasian Flyway, including a significant portion of sites for the critically endangered Siberian crane. The name "kytalyk" is the Yakut-language word for the Siberian crane. The park is on the low-lying tundra of the delta of the Indigirka River, on the East Siberian Sea in northern Russia. The park was officially created in 2019. The park is located in Allaikhovsky District of the Sakha Republic.

== Topography ==
The park is in the Yana-Indigirka Lowland region on the northern coast of Yakutia. The ground, averaging 50–80 meters above sea-level, is distorted by the effects of water and ice in the soil: thermokarst, pingos, baydzharakhs, alas depressions, sinkholes, and peat bogs. Because body of water cannot evaporate, the soil is marshy and waterlogged. Thawing occurs from mid-June to mid-September, with the depth of seasonal soil thawing varying from 0.2 to 1.8 meters.

== Ecoregion and climate ==
The park is in the Northeast Siberian coastal tundra ecoregion.

The climate of the park is Tundra climate (Köppen climate classification ET), a local climate in which at least one month has an average temperature high enough to melt snow (0 °C (32 °F)), but no month with an average temperature in excess of 10 °C (50 °F).

Chokurdakh, Sakha Republic

Climate chart (precipitation, max. and min. temperature)
| J | F | M | A | M | J | J | A | S | O | N | D |
| 0.4 −23 −35 | 0.4 −21 −33 | 0.4 −10 −24 | 0.3 7 −9 | 0.4 29 16 | 0.9 51 36 | 1.1 61 44 | 1.2 54 39 | 0.9 39 30 | 0.8 16 6 | 0.7 −12 −18 | 0.6 −25 −31 |
- █ Average max. and min. temperatures in °F
- █ Precipitation totals in inches
- Source: Pogodaiklimat.com
Metric conversion
| J | F | M | A | M | J | J | A | S | O | N | D |
| 10 −30 −37 | 10 −29 −36 | 10 −23 −31 | 7.6 −14 −23 | 10 −2 −9 | 23 11 2 | 28 16 6 | 30 12 4 | 23 4 −1 | 20 −9 −14 | 18 −25 −28 | 15 −32 −35 |
- █ Average max. and min. temperatures in °C
- █ Precipitation totals in mm

== Plants and animals ==
With shallow permafrost soils and a growing season of only 60–90 days, the flora is limited to plants adapted to the Arctic coastal tundra. The dominant species of the saline meadows are Puccinellia phryganodes (a salt grass), Carex subspathacea (Hoppner's sedge), Cochlearia arctica (an Arctic species of scurvy-grass), and Stellaria humifusa (Saltmarsh starwort). Sphagnum (Mosses) cover up to 50% of the terrain, represented by over 100 species. 70 species of lichen are present, with the most common being Cetraria cocullata. The park has recorded 221 species of vascular plants, with the herbaceous cover reaching only an average of 25 cm in height.

Fauna are represented by 21 species of mammals (including Brown lemming, Arctic lemming, Muskrat, and Musk ox), 84 of terrestrial invertebrates, and 28 of fish. Of birds there are recorded 96 species, of which 63 breed in the park.

On the southern edge of the park is the "Berelekh mammoth cemetery", where scientists have discovered a mass burial site of over 140 mammoths.

== See also ==
- Protected areas of Russia
