= Vorontsovo, Sakha Republic =

Vorontsovo Воронцово Воронцово (Sakha)
- Selo
- Interactive map of Vorontsovo
- Location of Vorontsovo Vorontsovo (Sakha Republic)
- Coordinates: 69°34′32″N 147°31′58″E
- Country: Russia
- Federal subject: Sakha Republic
- Administrative district: Allaikhovsky District
- Rural okrugSelsoviet: Yukagirsky National Rural Okrug

Population (2010 Census)
  - Total: 0
  - Estimate (2021): 0 )

Municipal status
  - Municipal district: Allaikhovsky Municipal District
  - Rural settlement: Yukagirsky National Rural Settlement
- Time zone: UTC+11 (UTC+11:00)
- Postal code: 678810
- OKTMO ID: 98606476106

Vorontsovo (Russian: Воронцово; Yakut: Воронцово) is a rural locality (a selo), one of two settlements, in addition to Olenegorsk, the administrative centre of the Rural Okrug, in Yukagirsky National Rural Okrug of Allaikhovsky District in the Sakha Republic, Russia. It is located 180 kilometers (110 mi) from Chokurdakh, the administrative center of the district and 40 kilometers (25 mi) from Olenegorsk. Its population as of the 2010 Census was 0; the same as recorded in the 2002 Census.

== Geography ==
The village is located north of the Arctic Circle, in the lower course of the Indigirka, near the mouth of the Bolshaya Ercha.
