= Oyotung =

Oyotung Ойотунг Ойотуҥ (Sakha)
- Selo
- Interactive map of Oyotung
- Location of Oyotung Oyotung (Sakha Republic)
- Coordinates: 70°43′58″N 148°46′29″E
- Country: Russia
- Federal subject: Sakha Republic
- Administrative district: Allaikhovsky District
- Rural okrugSelsoviet: Oyotungsky National Nomadic Rural Okrug

Population (2010 Census)
  - Total: 0
  - Estimate (2021): 0 )

Administrative status
  - Capital of: Oyotungsky National Nomadic Rural Okrug

Municipal status
  - Municipal district: Allaikhovsky Municipal District
  - Rural settlement: Oyotungsky National Nomadic Rural Settlement
  - Capital of: Oyotungsky National Nomadic Rural Settlement
- Time zone: UTC+11 (UTC+11:00)
- Postal code: 678810
- OKTMO ID: 98606745902

Oyotung (Russian: Ойотунг; Yakut: Ойотуҥ, Oyotuŋ) is a rural locality (a selo), the only inhabited locality, and the administrative center of Oyotungsky National Nomadic Rural Okrug of Allaikhovsky District in the Sakha Republic, Russia, located 45 kilometers (28 mi) from Chokurdakh, the administrative center of the district. Its population as of the 2010 Census was 0, equal to the population recorded during the 2002 Census.
