= Rassokha =

Rassokha Рассоха
- Mouth location in Yakutia, Russia

Location
- Country: Russia
- Location: Yakutia

Physical characteristics
- Source
  - location: Lake Suokurdakh
  - coordinates: 69°1′42″N 151°43′55″E
  - elevation: 100 m (330 ft)
- Mouth: Alazeya
  - coordinates: 69°30′38″N 155°3′9″E
  - elevation: 6 m (20 ft)
- Length: 786 km (488 mi)
- Basin size: 27,300 km^{2} (10,500 sq mi)
- Discharge
  - average: 38 m^{3}/s (1,300 cu ft/s)

Basin features
- Progression: Alazeya→ East Siberian Sea

The Rassokha (Russian: Рассоха, also Россоха; Yakut: Рассоха) is a river in the northeastern part of Yakutia, Russia. It is the major tributary of the Alazeya.

== Geography ==
The river is 786 kilometres (488 mi) long. The area of its basin is 27,300 square kilometres (10,500 mi^{2}).

The Rassokha is formed by the confluence of the rivers Ilin-Yuryakh and Arga-Yuryakh in the Kolyma Lowland. The original sources of the uppermost river in the network are in the Ulakhan-Sis Range. The Rassokha flows across the Middle Kolyma District and the Lower Kolyma District in an area marked by permafrost, with numerous swamps and lakes. Finally it joins the left bank of the Alazeya 383 km (238 mi) from its mouth.

The Rassokha has 145 tributaries that are longer than 10 km (6.2 mi) and in its basin there are 7,442 lakes with a total area of 3,240 km^{2} (1,250 sq mi).

The river freezes in late September through early October and stays icebound until the end of May.

== Fauna ==
The forest-tundra of the Rassokha basin, together with the Kondakov Plateau and the Suor Uyata and the Ulakhan-Tas, is part of the migration corridor of the Sundrun reindeer population.

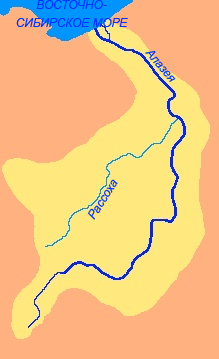
Map of the Alazeya basin with the Rassokha on the left.

== See also ==
- List of rivers of Russia
