= Olenegorsk =

Olenegorsk may refer to:

- Olenegorsk, Murmansk Oblast, a town in Murmansk Oblast, Russia
  - Olenya air base near it
- Olenegorsk, Sakha Republic, a village (selo) in the Sakha Republic, Russia
