= Arga-Yuryakh (Rassokha) =

River in Yakutia, Russia

Arga-Yuryakh Арга-Юрях / Арҕаа Үрэх
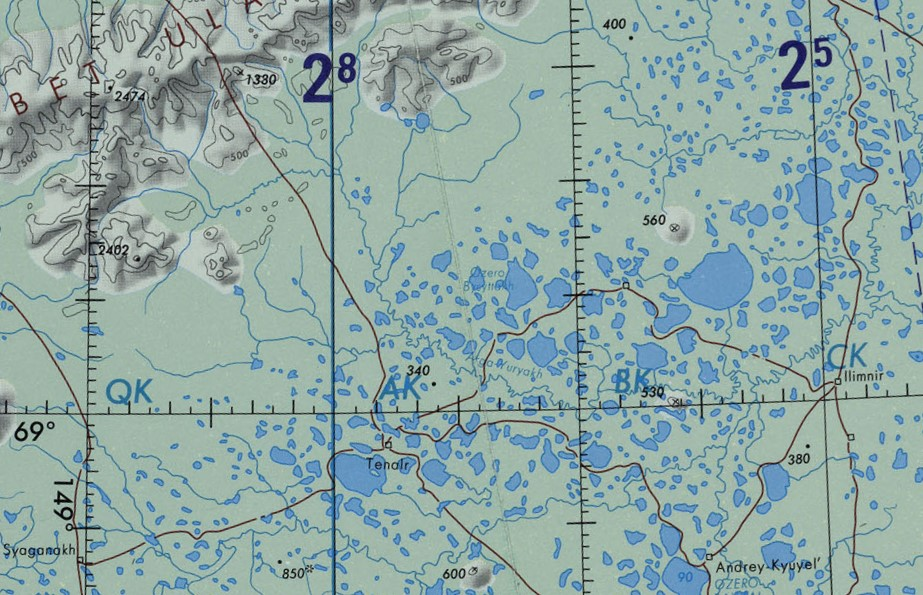
- Course of the Arga-Yuryakh ONC map section

- Mouth location in Yakutia, Russia

Location
- Country: Russia

Physical characteristics
- Source
  - location: Ulakhan-Sis
  - coordinates: 69°22′23″N 149°24′32″E
  - elevation: 93 m (305 ft)
- Mouth: Rassokha
  - coordinates: 69°01′43″N 151°43′57″E
  - elevation: 17 m (56 ft)
- Length: 312 km (194 mi)
- Basin size: 5,600 km^{2} (2,200 sq mi)

Basin features
- Progression: Rassokha → Alazeya → Laptev Sea

The Arga-Yuryakh (Russian: Арга-Юрях; Yakut: Арҕаа Үрэх, Arğaa Ürex) is a river in Sakha Republic (Yakutia), Russia. It is a tributary of the Rassokha of the Alazeya basin. The river has a length of 312 kilometres (194 mi) and a drainage basin area of 5,600 square kilometres (2,200 mi^{2}).

The river flows north of the Arctic Circle, across desolate tundra territories of the East Siberian Lowland. Its basin falls within Srednekolymsky District. The name of the river comes from the Yakut "Arğaa-ürex" (Арҕаа-үрэх), meaning "western river".

== Course ==
The Arga-Yuryakh has its sources at the confluence of the 21 km (13 mi) long Zeya and the 20 km (12 mi) long Taba-Bastaakh in the southern slopes of the Ulakhan-Sis. It flows roughly southwards away from the range, first following its southern flank eastwards, then bending southwards into a region of lakes of the Kolyma Lowland. The river meanders strongly, heading southeastwards across the vast lake area. Finally it meets the left bank of the northward flowing Ilin-Yuryakh. The confluence of both rivers forms the Rassokha, the largest tributary of the Alazeya.

=== Tributaries ===
The main tributaries of the Arga-Yuryakh are the 126 km (78 mi) long Achchygyi-Yurekh (Аччыгый-Юрэх) on the right, as well as the 62 km (39 mi) long Ot-Yurekh and the 50 km (31 mi) long Kusagan-Yurekh on the left. The river is frozen between late September or early October and late May or early June.

The Arga-Yuryakh is fed by snow, rain and ice. The river basin is marked by permafrost, swamps and lakes, the lake surface taking 15.2% of the total basin area.

== See also ==
- List of rivers of Russia
