= Nychalakh =

Nychalakh Нычалах Нычалаах (Sakha)
- Selo
- Interactive map of Nychalakh
- Location of Nychalakh Nychalakh (Sakha Republic)
- Coordinates: 69°55′46″N 146°12′45″E
- Country: Russia
- Federal subject: Sakha Republic
- Administrative district: Allaikhovsky District
- Rural okrugSelsoviet: Byyagnyrsky Rural Okrug
- Founded: 1936

Population (2010 Census)
  - Total: 155
  - Estimate (January 2016): 109 (−29.7%)

Administrative status
  - Capital of: Byyagnyrsky Rural Okrug

Municipal status
  - Municipal district: Allaikhovsky Municipal District
  - Rural settlement: Byyagnyrsky Rural Settlement
  - Capital of: Byyagnyrsky Rural Settlement
- Time zone: UTC+11 (UTC+11:00)
- Postal code: 678815
- OKTMO ID: 98606437101

Nychalakh (Russian: Нычалах; Yakut: Нычалаах, romanized: Nıçalâx) is a rural locality (a selo), the only inhabited locality, and the administrative center of Byyagnyrsky Rural Okrug of Allaikhovsky District in the Sakha Republic, Russia, located 190 kilometers (120 mi) from Chokurdakh, the administrative center of the district. Its population as of the 2010 Census was 117, of whom 60 were male and 57 female, down from 146 recorded during the 2002 Census.
