= Allaikhovsky District =

Allaikhovsky District Аллаиховский улус (Russian)
- District

Other transcription(s)
  - Yakut: Аллайыаха улууhа
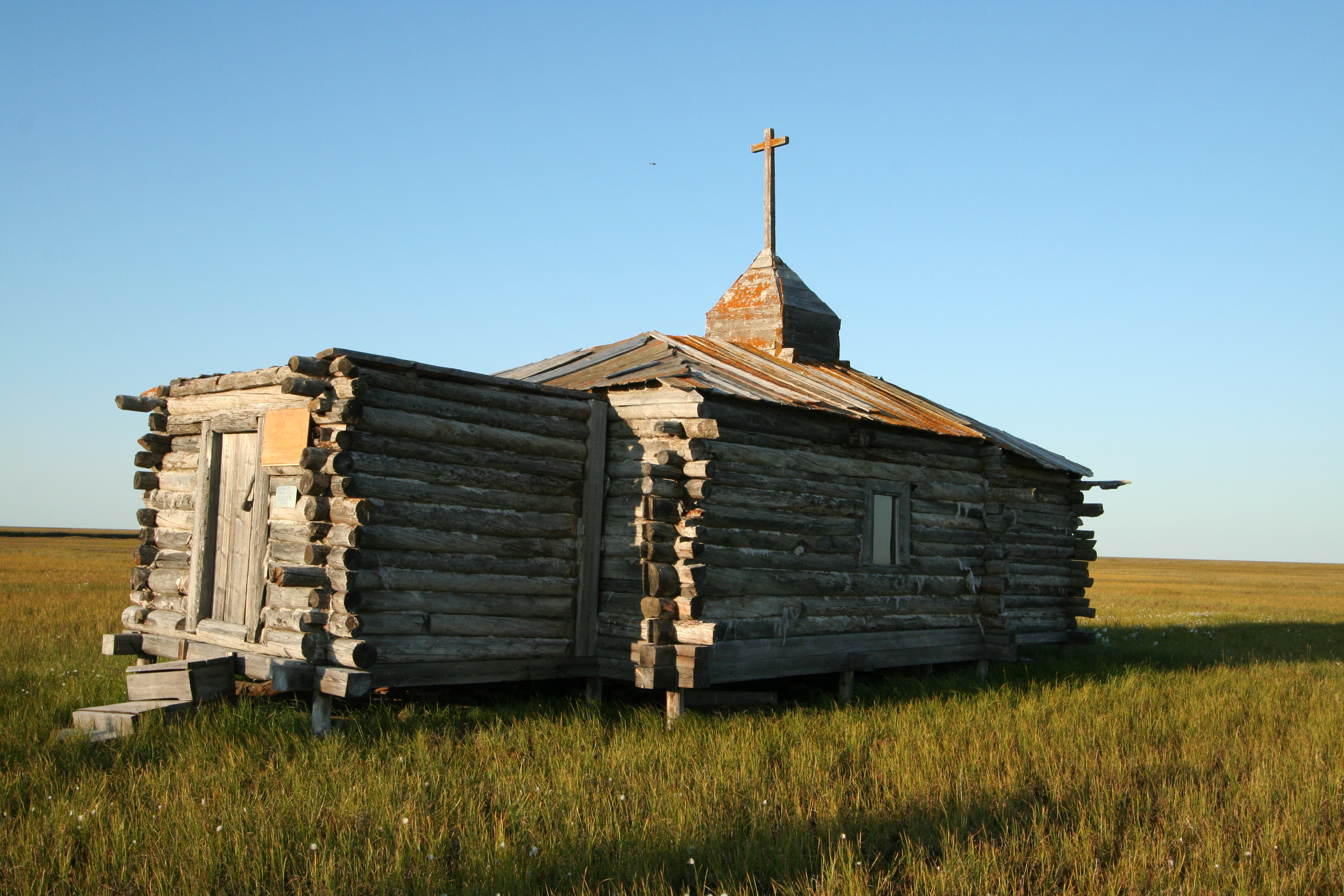
- Church in Russkoye Ustye, Allaikhovsky District

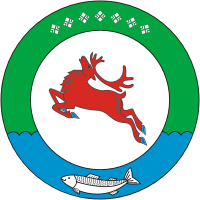
- Coat of arms
- Location of Allaikhovsky District in the Sakha Republic
- Coordinates: 70°50′N 146°58′E
- Country: Russia
- Federal subject: Sakha Republic
- Established: May 20, 1931
- Administrative center: Chokurdakh

Area
  - Total: 107,300 km^{2} (41,400 sq mi)

Population (2010 Census)
  - Total: 3,050
  - Estimate (January 2016): 2,682
  - Density: 0.0284/km^{2} (0.0736/sq mi)
  - Urban: 77.6%
  - Rural: 22.4%

Administrative structure
  - Administrative divisions: 1 Settlements, 5 Rural okrugs
  - Inhabited localities: 1 urban-type settlements, 6 rural localities

Municipal structure
  - Municipally incorporated as: Allaikhovsky Municipal District
  - Municipal divisions: 1 urban settlements, 4 rural settlements
- Time zone: UTC+
- OKTMO ID: 98606000
- Website: https://mr-allaihovskij.sakha.gov.ru/

Population of Allaikhovsky District
- 2010 Census: 3,050
- 2002 Census: 3,421
- 1989 Census: 5,218
- 1979 Census: 4,963

Allaikhovsky District (Russian: Алла́иховский улу́с; Yakut: Аллайыаха улууһа, Allayıaxa uluuha) is an administrative and municipal district (raion, or ulus), one of the thirty-four in the Sakha Republic, Russia. It is located in the northeast of the republic towards the mouth of the Indigirka River and borders with the East Siberian Sea in the north, Nizhnekolymsky District in the east, Srednekolymsky District in the southeast, Abyysky District in the south, and with Ust-Yansky District in the west. The area of the district is 107,300 square kilometers (41,400 sq mi). Its administrative center is the urban locality (an urban-type settlement) of Chokurdakh. As of the 2010 Census, the total population of the district was 3,050, with the population of Chokurdakh accounting for 77.6% of that number.

== Geography ==
It is located north of the Arctic Circle, in the lower reaches of the Indigirka River. Most of the district is part of the Yana-Indigirka Lowland and Kolyma Lowland. The Polousny Range and the Ulakhan-Sis are located to the south and the Kondakov Highland rises to the east. The Indigirka and its numerous tributaries, such as the Bolshaya Ercha and the Allaikha River, as well as the Khroma —with the Uryung-Ulakh, the Kyuyol-Yuryakh, Bogdashkina and Gusinaya in the far northern end, flow through the district. Lake Soluntakh is one of the largest in the district.

== History ==
The district was established on May 20, 1931.

== Administrative and municipal status ==
Within the framework of administrative divisions, Allaikhovsky District is one of the thirty-four in the republic. It is divided into one settlement (an administrative division with the administrative center in the urban-type settlement (inhabited locality) of Chokurdakh) and five rural okrugs (naslegs), all of which comprise six rural localities. As a municipal division, the district is incorporated as Allaikhovsky Municipal District. The Settlement of Chokurdakh is incorporated into an urban settlement, four rural okrugs are incorporated into four rural settlements within the municipal district, and the territory of the fifth rural okrug is managed by the municipal district as inter-settlement territory. The urban-type settlement of Chokurdakh serves as the administrative center of both the administrative and municipal district.

=== Inhabited localities ===
Administrative/municipal composition
Settlements/Urban settlements	Population	Inhabited localities in jurisdiction
Chokurdakh (Чокурдах)	2,756	urban-type settlement of Chokurdakh (administrative center of the district)
Rural okrugs/Rural settlements	Population	Rural localities in jurisdiction*
Berelekhsky (Берелехский)	155	**selo of Chkalov**
Byyagnyrsky (Быягнырский)	117	**selo of Nychalakh**
Russko-Ustinsky (Русско-Устьинский)	157	**selo of Russkoye Ustye**
Yukagirsky (Юкагирский)	254	**selo of Olenegorsk**; selo of Vorontsovo
Oyotungsky (Ойотунгский)	0	**selo of Oyotung**

*Administrative centers are shown in bold

== Economy ==
The main forms of business are reindeer husbandry, fishing, and fur trade. There are deposits of tin and gold in the district.

== Demographics ==
As of the 2021 Census, the ethnic composition was as follows:

- Yakuts: 38.3%
- Russians: 31.7%
- Evens: 21.4%
- Yukaghirs: 3.6%
- Chukchi: 1.2%
- Ukrainians: 1.0%
- Buryats: 0.9%
- others: 1.9%

== Climate ==
Average January temperature ranges from −32 to −38 °C (−26 to −36 °F) and average July temperature ranges from +4 °C (39 °F) in the north to +12 °C (54 °F) in the south.
