= Shangina =

Shangina Шангина / Шангин
- Mouth location in Yakutia, Russia

Location
- Federal subject: Yakutia, Russia

Physical characteristics
- Source
  - location: Alazeya Plateau
  - coordinates: 68°26′30″N 147°59′30″E
- Mouth: Indigirka
  - location: Near Ozhogino
  - coordinates: 69°08′31″N 147°34′33″E
- Length: 344 km (214 mi)
- Basin size: 5,750 km^{2} (2,220 sq mi)

Basin features
- Progression: Indigirka→ East Siberian Sea

The Shangina (Russian: Шангина; Yakut: Шангин, Şangin) is a river in Yakutia (Sakha Republic), Russia. It has a length of 344 kilometres (214 mi) and a drainage basin of 5,750 square kilometres (2,220 mi^{2}).

It is a right tributary of the Indigirka, flowing across the Middle Kolyma and Aby districts. The river usually freezes in early October and stays frozen until late May or early June.

== History ==
In the summer of 1870 the Shangina was explored by geographer and ethnologist Baron Gerhard von Maydell (1835–1894) during his pioneering research of East Siberia. After he charted the Suor-Uyata and Ulakhan-Sis ranges of the East Siberian Lowlands, Maydell reached the Indigirka. Going about 100 km (62 mi) upriver he found out that the Ulakhan-Sis was separated from the Alazeya Plateau to the south by the roughly 50 km (31 mi) wide plain of the Shangina.

== Course ==
The Shangina river begins in the northern part of the Alazeya Plateau. It heads first roughly eastwards then descends into in a wide floodplain where it heads northwestwards. There are many lakes in the middle and lower part of the basin. Finally the Shangina joins the right bank of the Indigirka 420 km (260 mi) from its mouth. There are no inhabited places in its course.

Its main tributary is the 74 kilometres (46 mi) long Ogustakh on the right.

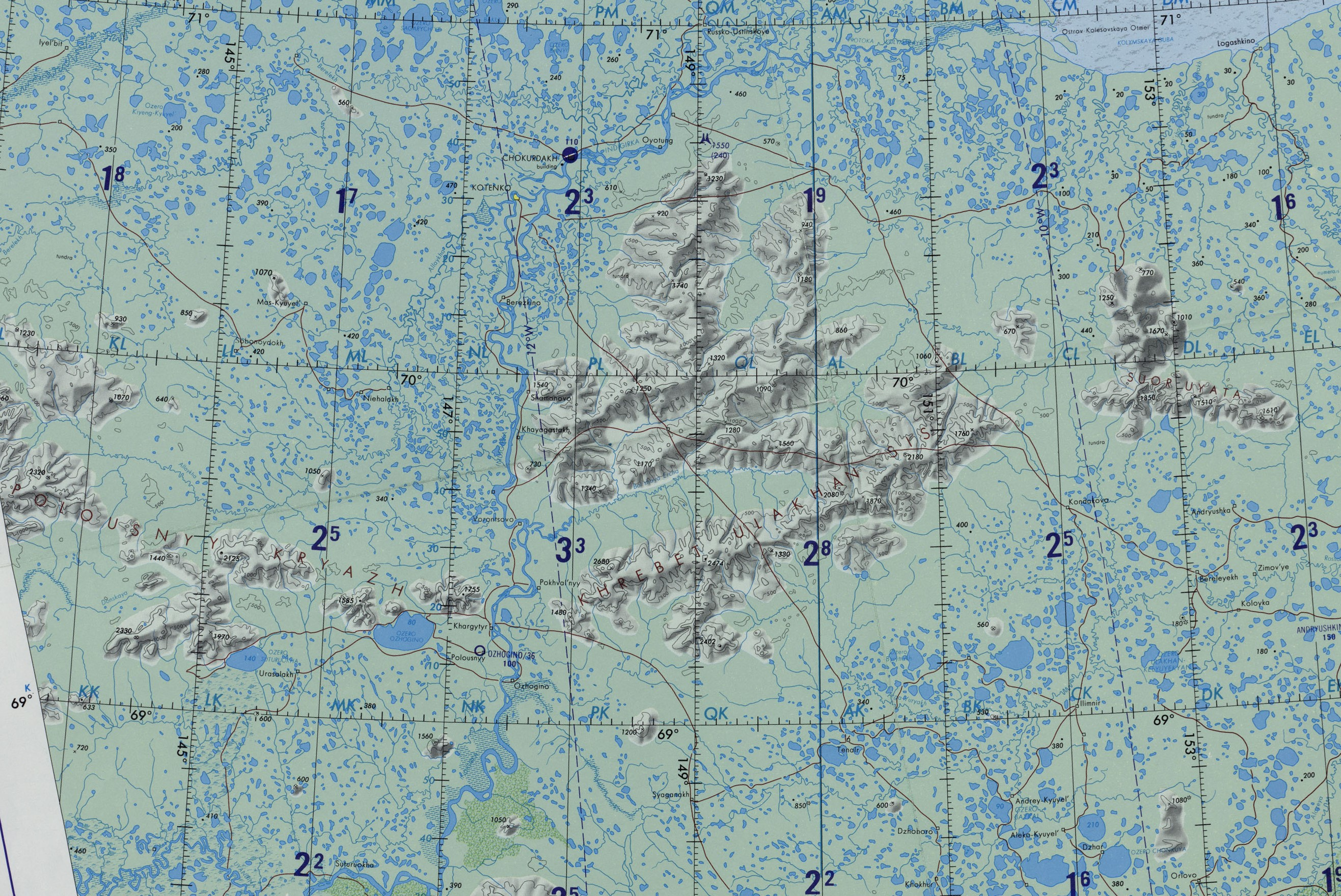
ONC map section of the area.

== See also ==
- List of rivers of Russia
