= Shandrin =

Shandrin Шандрин
- Mouth location in Yakutia, Russia

Location
- Federal subject: Yakutia, Russia

Physical characteristics
- Source
  - location: Orgolyor Lake
  - coordinates: 69°50′17″N 149°14′45″E
  - elevation: 146 m (479 ft)
- Mouth: Indigirka
  - location: Kolymskaya canal
  - coordinates: 70°55′22″N 151°03′24″E
  - elevation: 0.4 m (1 ft 4 in)
- Length: 414 km (257 mi)
- Basin size: 7,570 km^{2} (2,920 sq mi)

Basin features
- Progression: Indigirka→ East Siberian Sea

The Shandrin (Russian: Шандрин) is a river in Yakutia (Sakha Republic), Russia. It has a length of 414 kilometres (257 mi) and a drainage basin of 7,570 square kilometres (2,920 mi^{2}).

It is a left tributary of the Indigirka, flowing across the Allaikhovsky District. There are no inhabited places in its course. The river usually freezes in early October and stays frozen until late May or early June.

== History ==
The Shandrin mammoth was discovered in 1974 near the river at the feet of a steep slope in the eastern side of the Kondakov Plateau by geologist B. S. Rusanov of the Yakutsk Institute of Geology. The study of the carcass revealed that the mammoth had died between 41 and 32 thousand years ago. Its entrails were well-preserved and their contents made it possible to determine the composition of the paleoflora of the area at the time the animal had lived. The contents of the entrails included species of grasses, sedges, wormwood, larch, spruce, dwarf pine, birch, alder and willow.

== Course ==
The Shandrin river begins north of the Arctic Circle, in the Orgolyor (Орголёр) lake of the northern slopes of the Ulakhan-Sis. It heads roughly eastwards across a treeless hilly area by the Kondakov Plateau until the mouth of its Antykchan tributary, after which it bends northeastwards and flows across a partly swampy floodplain. There are many lakes in the lower part of the basin where the river meanders across a wide plain among lakes. Finally the Shandrin joins the Indigirka in the Kolymskaya channel of its delta near Lake Bolshoi Otor.

Its main tributary is the 135 kilometres (84 mi) long Tilekh joining it from the right.

== See also ==
- List of rivers of Russia
