= Chkalov, Allaikhovsky District, Sakha Republic =

Chkalov Чкалов Чкалов (Sakha)
- Selo
- Interactive map of Chkalov
- Location of Chkalov Chkalov (Sakha Republic)
- Coordinates: 70°32′12″N 144°42′59″E
- Country: Russia
- Federal subject: Sakha Republic
- Administrative district: Allaikhovsky District
- Rural okrugSelsoviet: Berelekhsky Rural Okrug
- Founded: 1936

Population (2010 Census)
  - Total: 155
  - Estimate (January 2016): 139 (−10.3%)

Administrative status
  - Capital of: Berelekhsky Rural Okrug

Municipal status
  - Municipal district: Allaikhovsky Municipal District
  - Rural settlement: Berelekhsky Rural Settlement
  - Capital of: Berelekhsky Rural Settlement
- Time zone: UTC+11 (UTC+11:00)
- Postal code: 678815
- OKTMO ID: 98606424101

Chkalov (Russian: Чкалов; Yakut: Чкалов, romanized: Çkalov) is a rural locality (a selo), the only inhabited locality, and the administrative center of Berelekhsky Rural Okrug of Allaikhovsky District in the Sakha Republic, Russia, located 180 kilometers (110 mi) from Chokurdakh, the administrative center of the district. Its population as of the 2010 Census was 155, of whom 84 were male and 71 female, down from 195 recorded during the 2002 Census.
