= Khastakh =

River in Yakutia, Russia

Khastakh (Tuora-Yuryakh) Хастах / Хаастаах
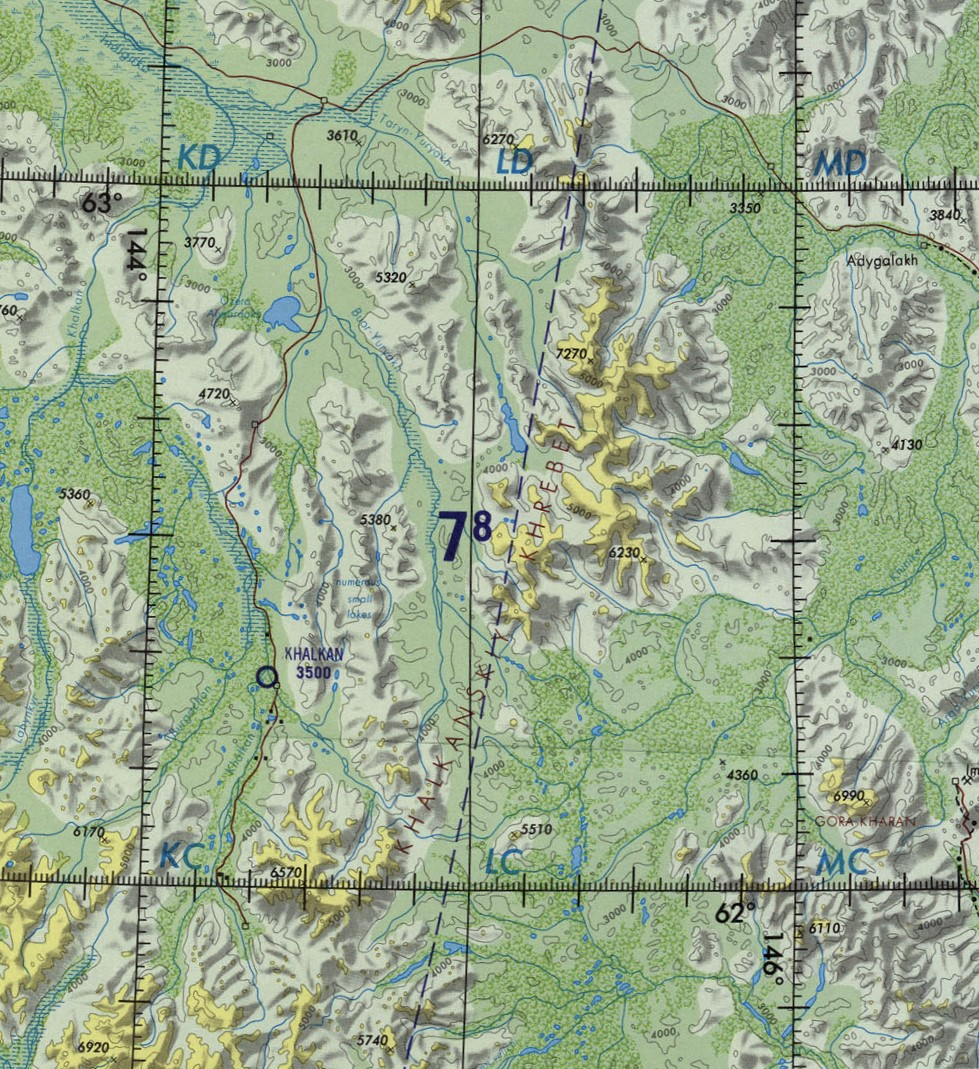
- Khalkan Range ONC map section with the courses of the two rivers forming the Indigirka

- Mouth location in Yakutia, Russia

Location
- Country: Russia

Physical characteristics
- Source
  - location: Khalkan Range
  - coordinates: 61°48′53″N 144°02′28″E
- Mouth: Indigirka
  - coordinates: 63°06′41″N 144°11′07″E
  - elevation: 792 metres (2,598 ft)
- Length: 251 km (156 mi)
- Basin size: 10,500 km^{2} (4,100 sq mi)

Basin features
- Progression: Indigirka → Laptev Sea

The Khastakh or Tuora-Yuryakh (Russian: Хастах; Yakut: Хаастаах, Xaastaax) is a river in the Sakha Republic (Yakutia), Russia. It is one of the two tributaries giving origin to the Indigirka. The river has a length of 251 kilometres (156 mi) and a drainage basin area of 10,500 square kilometres (4,100 mi^{2}). The upper stretch of its course is also known as Khalkan.

The river flows south of the Arctic Circle, across desolate tundra territories of the Oymyakonsky District marked by mountainous terrain and permafrost.

== Course ==
The Khastakh is a left tributary of the Indigirka. It has its sources in the southern slopes of the Khalkan Range (Халканский хребет), a subrange of the Suntar-Khayata, by the border with Okhotsky District of Khabarovsk Krai. The river flows roughly in a northern direction into a basin of the Yana-Oymyakon Highlands filled with lakes where it meanders and divides into multiple channels. Finally the river joins the Taryn-Yuryakh flowing from the right to form the head of the Indigirka 1,726 km (1,072 mi) from its mouth. The total length of the Indigirka counting the Khastakh is 1,977 km (1,228 mi).

=== Tributaries ===
The main tributaries of the Khastakh are the 132 km (82 mi) long Buor-Yuryakh on the right, as well as the 82 km (51 mi) long Burgachen and the 107 km (66 mi) long Labynkyr on the left. The river is frozen between the beginning of October and the end of May. There are more than 1,900 lakes in its basin with a total area of 145 km^{2} (56 sq mi).

== See also ==
- List of rivers of Russia
- Sakha Republic
