= Zashiversk =

Former town in Sakha Republic, Russia

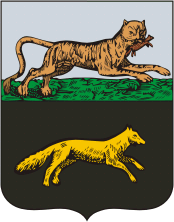
Coat of arms of Zashiversk (1790; the upper half reproduces coat of arms of Irkutsk).

Zashiversk (Russian: Зашиверск; Yakut: Зашиверскай, romanized: Zaşiverskay) was a town founded in 1639 north of the Arctic circle in what is now the Sakha Republic (Yakutkia), Russia. It was located on the right bank of the Indigirka River where the river makes a sharp bend around the town-site. It served as a fortress town and then as an administrative center. In 1803 administrative functions were removed to Verkhoyansk. Subsequently the town suffered repeated epidemics of smallpox. It was completely depopulated by 1898, though one source says by 1863.

Spaso-Zashiverskaya church (built 1700) was moved to Novosibirsk by Alexey Okladnikov, and now it exhibited at the Museum of the Archeological Institute of the Russian Academy of Science.

== Early colony ==
From the end of the Time of Troubles small groups of Russians penetrated and colonized the Far Eastern Arctic, in two distinct waves originating from White Sea area and from the Ural Mountains. In 1639 the company of Postnik Ivanov, a Siberian cossack, reached the site of Zashiversk and stayed there for the winter. The site, located below the rapids (Shivery, шиверы, in Siberian dialect, thus the name Zashiversk) of the Indigirka River, some 870 kilometers from its inlet, marked the crossroads of a river route to Kolyma and Chukotka and a land route (Tsar's Trail, царская дорога) from Yakutsk to Nizhnekolymsk. Postnik reported abundance of valuable sable and fish, significant population of native settlers and nomads as well as silver possessed by the Yukagirs; the voyevoda of Yakutsk responded with establishment of a permanent colony to exploit the opportunity.

The Russians enforced taxation of natives through collection of yasak in sable furs and regularly trespassed their self-assumed rights; the natives evaded extortion by resettling to remote areas. Twice, in 1668 (Forsyth: 1666-1667) and 1679, the Lamuts openly revolted and besieged Zashiversk, but the colonists prevailed and fortified the settlement with a wooden stockade, the only one of its kind on the Indigirka. The Lamuts were dispersed with fortress guns, but successfully destroyed a Russian caravan on the way from Yana River to Zashiversk. Their active resistance continued until 1692, by 1700 the Lamuts and Yukagirs were firmly pressed into submission and ended their own fighting among native clans.

The wooden tented church of Saviour was erected in 1700. Explorer Dmitry Laptev complained in 1741 that Zashiversk church remained the only Orthodox church from the mouth of Lena River to Anadyr. Noted preacher of Zashiversk Church, father Alexey Sleptsov, was an exile, son of former governor of Moscow Ivan Sleptsov. In 1735 was allowed to preach on condition that he will not ever leave Zashiversk. He died in 1783 at the age of 74 and his duties were assumed by his son Mikhail who lived past the age of 87.

== Prosperity ==
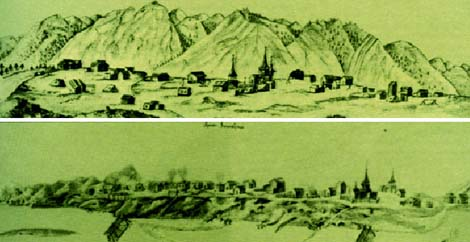
Drawing of Zashiversk between 1785 and 1792 by Luka Voronin, reproduced in the 1948 edition of Ferdinand von Wrangel's memoirs

Zashiversk grew as a marketplace settlement, and its annual fair attracted traders from all over the Far East. In 1786 its organic growth was boosted by establishment of uezd administration; influx of government bureaucrats and their servants temporarily made it a proper town with a city hall, prison, police force of thirty cossacks and a tavern. Population reached five hundreds, including 64 military and 8 clergymen. This prosperity was recorded in detail by explorers Gavril Sarychev and Joseph Billings who also noted hospitality of local ispravnik Ivan Banner, an ethnic Dane in Russian service. Banner, apart from daily police functions, actively recruited the Chukchi into accepting Russian citizenship and jealously tracked the activities of foreign traders in the area. He later joined the staff of the Russian American Company.

Coat of arms of Zashiversk was approved in October 1790 along with other coats of arms of the Irkutsk Governorate. According to the blazon, the golden fox in a black field symbolized hunting foxes as the source of subsistence for the population. Overhunting during the 18th century depleted wildlife; decrease in fur trading spelled the town's end. In 1803, when Zashiversk lost its former economic significance as a marketplace, the uezd was abolished, and all government functions relocated to Verkhoyansk.

== Decline ==
Arctic explorer Ferdinand von Wrangel, who crossed Siberia in the summer of 1820 and reached Zashiversk in October, noted that although after the 1786 the settlement expanded to around thirty permanent houses (as opposed to earlier yurtas), after the merger of Verkhoyansk and Zashiversk uezds the latter "plunged into its former misery". By 1820 the town shrunk to only five houses; there were two Russian families, a Yakut postmaster, Orthodox missionary father Mikhail and his brother. Wrangel was surprised to find local church well-maintained although father Mikhail was 87 years old. He preached in the Arctic for sixty years, converted around 15 thousand natives, and was still able to cross his enormous parish on horseback and hunt wild game in the mountains. Mikhail was the only local able to grow cabbage and root vegetables in short Arctic summers. Yakuts of father Mikhail's parish were segregated into the richer nomads who herded horses and cattle, and poorer settlers, the "River Yakuts". The latter settled along the rivers, and survived by fishing alone, their only livestock being the sled dogs. Zashiversk then still retained some of its logistical functions: Wrangel's stay there coincided with the passage of a government caravan with salt and flour heading to Nizhnekolymsk; horses for the caravan were provided by the Yakuts.

John Dundas Cochrane visited Zashiversk in December 1822 on foot and lamented that "Of all the places I have ever seen, bearing the name of city or town, this is the most dreary and desolate: my blood froze within me as I beheld and approached the place." He recorded seven single-person households: two clergymen, a widow, two non-commissioned officers, a postmaster and a trader: "I have seen a merchant ship with sixteen guns and only fifteen men, but I never before saw a town with only seven inhabitants". Cochrane praised the hospitality of these people who provided him with "living in a state of luxury" and "plenty of fish ... the greatest delicacy I have ever tasted."

== Ghost town ==
Wrangel and Cochrane visited Zashiversk after the population was hit by the first outbreak of smallpox in 1816. The second outbreak, in 1840, killed all the remaining settlers (or, according to different accounts, spared just one girl). Depopulation of Zashiversk spawned a Siberian legend: when local traders found a chest abandoned at the fairground, a shaman prohibited opening the chest while an Orthodox priest agreed to open it. Traders opened the chest ... and released the grim reaper. According to George Kennan, in 1879 the bureaucracy believed that the deserted town still existed, and dispatched Hermann Schiller, a political exile from Poltava, on a 3,700 mile march on foot to Zashiversk. Only then did the news of the town's demise reach the government, and Schiller was taken on another year's journey to Srednekolymsk. A similar fictional story was retold by Adam Szymansky in A Pinch of Salt.

Officially, Zashiversk ceased to exist only in 1890. Harry de Windt, who travelled through the region in 1902, witnessed Zashiversk abandoned, its ruins still standing. He noted that the town was still marked on contemporary British maps and the 1883 map of Russian General Staff.

== Modern studies ==
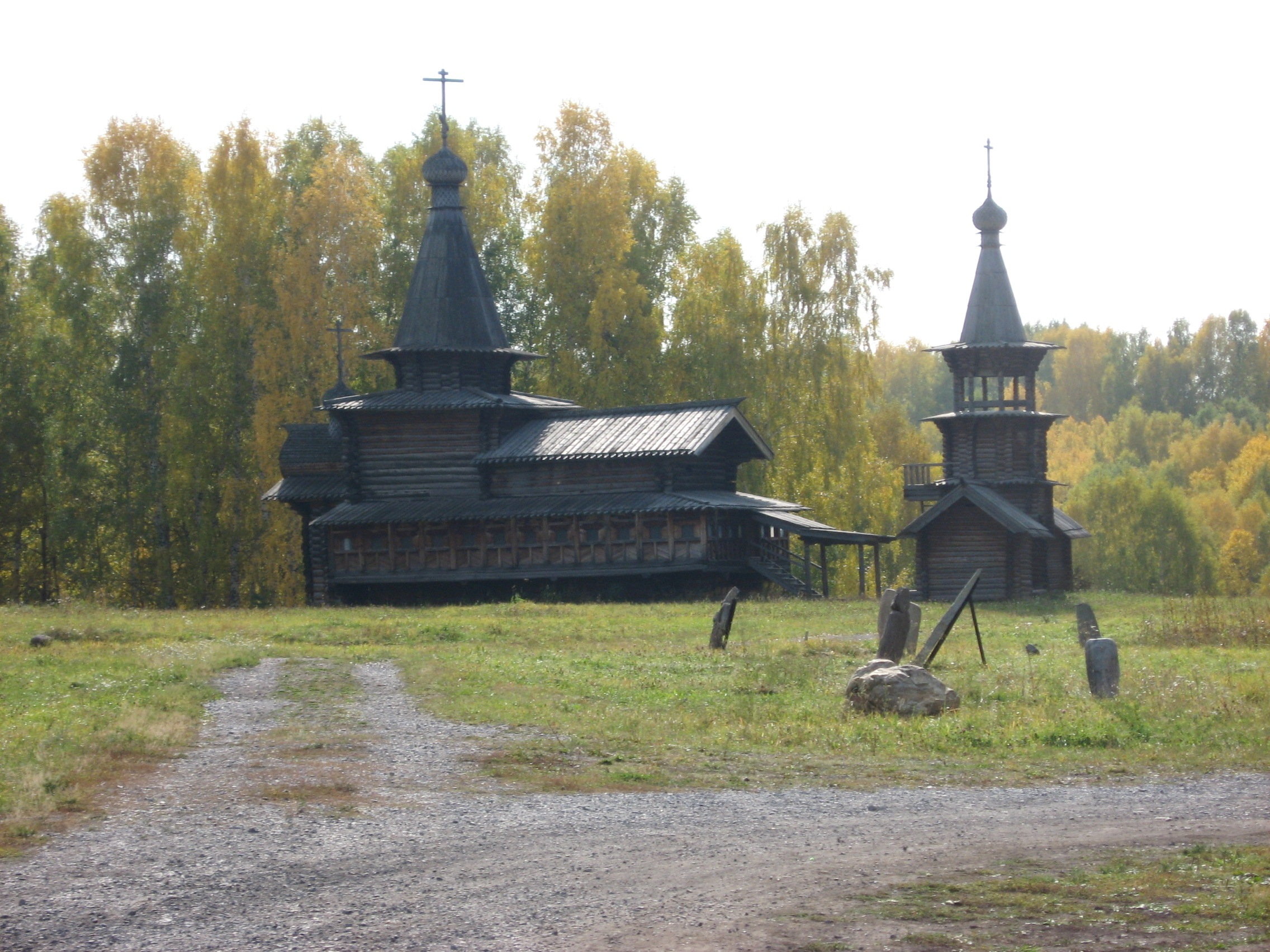
The wooden church from Zashiversk (built ca. 1700)

In 1969, achaelologists led by Alexey Okladnikov rediscovered and surveyed the remains of Zashiversk. According to archaeologist Nikolay Zhurin, Okladnikov was tipped about the existence of Zashiversk Church by polar aviation pilots, who wondered how could the church emerge and survive in a frozen wilderness. He set up the 1969 expedition and, indeed, found the church, unattended for around a century, in good condition. A second expedition, in 1971, carefully disassembled the log structure (recruiting curious helicopter pilots to pull up the whole tented roof assembly) and shipped the parts to Akademgorodok. Volunteers slowly assembled the church on the site of the future open-air museum (54°51′0″N 83°10′43″E) but, as of June 2006, the interiors were not restored and the church has not been consecrated to resume service.

Okladnikov and his colleagues Gogolev and Ashchepkov authored the definitive academic book on the subject, Ancient Zashiversk (Древний Зашиверск), printed by Nauka in 1977. A replica of Zashiversk church has been erected in Sottintsy open-air museum (Ust-Aldansky Ulus of Sakha Republic).

== Sources ==
- Anna Anisimova (June 30, 2006). "Muzey pod otrkytym nebom (Музей под открытым небом: путешествие на машине времени)" (in Russian). academ.info. Archived from the original on 2009-11-18.
- John Dundas Cochrane (1824). Narrative of a Pedestrian Journey Through Russia and Siberian Tartary, from the Frontiers of China to the Frozen Sea and Kamtchatka. Printed for Charles Knight. (reprint of original 1825 edition)
- James Forsyth (1994). A History of the Peoples of Siberia: Russia's North Asian Colony 1581-1990. Cambridge University Press. ISBN 0521477719.
- Fyodorov, Vladimir (January 13, 2004). "Novogodnee eho zapolyarnoy Pompei (Новогоднее эхо заполярной Помпеи)" (in Russian). Yakutia (newspaper).
- George Kennan (2006). Siberia and the Exile System. Volume 1. Adamant Media Corporation. ISBN 0543983188.
- Richard Pierce (1990). Russian America: a biographical dictionary. Limestone Press. ISBN 0919642454.
- Ferdinand von Wrangel (1948). Puteshestvie po severnym beregam Sibiri i Ledovitogo okeana (Путешествие по северным берегам Сибири и по Ледовитому морю) (in Russian). Glavsevmporput. (first edition: Saint Petersburg, 1841)
  - English edition: Wrangel, Ferdinand von (1852). Narrative of an expedition to the Polar Sea, in the years 1820, 1821, 1822 & 1823: commanded by Lieutenant, now Admiral, Ferdinand von Wrangel. Harper and Brothers, Cliff-St. "Narrative of an expedition to the Polar Sea."
- Harry de Windt (1903). From Paris to New York by Land. Thomas Nelson & sons. London.
- A. Zakharova (February 23, 1999). "Ischeznuvshy gorod (Исчезнувший город)" (in Russian). Yakutia (daily newspaper), National Archives of Sakha Republic. Archived from the original on March 10, 2007.
