= Allaikha =

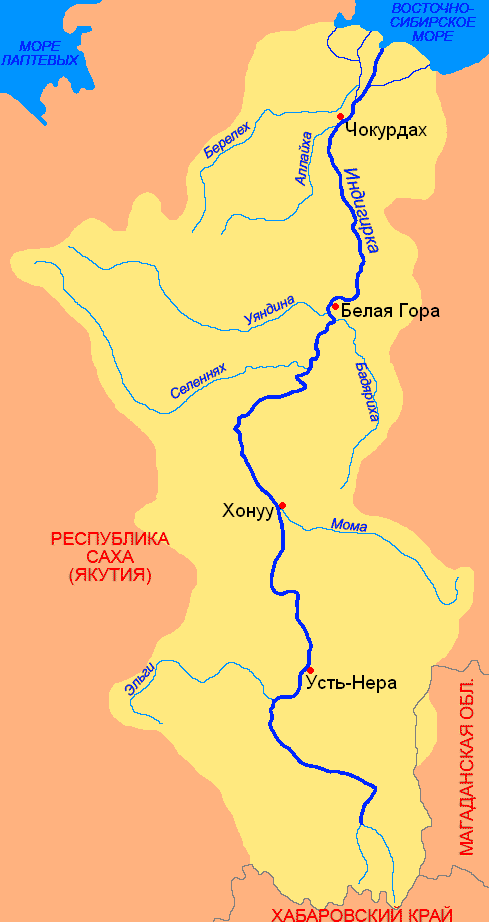
- Indigirka Basin

- Location in Sakha, Russia

Location
- Country: Russia

Physical characteristics
- Source
  - location: Polousny Range
  - elevation: 80 metres (260 ft)
- Mouth: Indigirka
  - coordinates: 70°31′43″N 147°42′50″E
  - elevation: 2 metres (6 ft 7 in)
- Length: 563 km (350 mi)
- Basin size: 12,400 km^{2} (4,800 sq mi)

Basin features
- Progression: Indigirka→ East Siberian Sea

The Allaikha (Russian: Алла́иха; Yakut: Аллайыаха, Allayıaxa) is a river of Sakha Republic, Russia, a left hand tributary of the Indigirka. It is 563 kilometres (350 mi) long, and has a drainage basin of 12,400 square kilometres (4,800 sq mi).

== Course ==
The Allaikha has its source in the northern slopes of the Polousny Range at the Swan Lake, in the confluence of two small rivers, Fena (Фена) and Elikcheen (Эликчээн). It flows meandering roughly northeastwards across the Yana-Indigirka Lowland. It finally joins the Indigirka about 15 km (9.3 mi) north of Chokurdakh.

There are more than four thousand lakes in the basin of the Allaikha. Its most important tributary is the Ot-Yuryakh from the left.

== See also ==
- List of mammoth specimens
- List of rivers of Russia
- Allaikhovsky
