= Russkoye Ustye =

Russkoye Ustye Русское Устье Русскай Устье (Sakha)
- Selo
- Interactive map of Russkoye Ustye
- Location of Russkoye Ustye Russkoye Ustye (Sakha Republic)
- Coordinates: 71°08′N 149°16′E
- Country: Russia
- Federal subject: Sakha Republic
- Administrative district: Allaikhovsky District
- Rural okrugSelsoviet: Russko-Ustinsky Rural Okrug

Population (2010 Census)
  - Total: 157
  - Estimate (January 2016): 130 (−17.2%)

Administrative status
  - Capital of: Russko-Ustinsky Rural Okrug

Municipal status
  - Municipal district: Allaikhovsky Municipal District
  - Rural settlement: Russko-Ustinsky Rural Settlement
  - Capital of: Russko-Ustinsky Rural Settlement
- Time zone: UTC+11 (UTC+11:00)
- Postal code: 678805
- OKTMO ID: 98606450101

Russkoye Ustye (Russian: Ру́сское У́стье; Yakut: Русскай Устье, romanized: Russkay ustye) is a rural locality (a selo), the only inhabited locality, and the administrative center of Russko-Ustinsky Rural Okrug of Allaikhovsky District in the Sakha Republic, Russia, located 120 kilometers (75 mi) from Chokurdakh, the administrative center of the district. Its population as of the 2010 Census was 157, down from 181 recorded during the 2002 Census. For several decades during the Soviet era, it was officially called Polyarnoye (Поля́рное).

== Etymology ==
The locality's name is probably based on the name of the river channel on which it is located, and which, too, has been known historically as the Russkoye Ustye. These days the channel is also known under the name Russko-Ustyinskaya Protoka that is formed from the locality's name. The original name of the channel, Russkoye Ustye, can be loosely translated as "the westernmost arm" [of the river delta], or the "westernmost river mouth". The noun ustye means "the river mouth" and the adjective Russkoye ("Russian") apparently refers to this channel's being the one located the farthest to the west (i.e., the one closest to [European] Russia). Similarly, the easternmost channel of the delta has been known as the Kolymskoye Ustye, i.e., the river mouth closest to the Kolyma (the Indigirka's neighbor to the east).

== Geography ==
Russkoye Ustye is located in the delta of the Indigirka River, about 80 kilometers (50 mi) from the fall of the main western channel of the Indigirka's delta into the East Siberian Sea of the Arctic Ocean.

== History ==
Russkoye Ustye was settled several centuries ago by ethnic Russians, who mixed to some extent with the indigenous Even people. As no agriculture is possible at this Arctic location, they developed an economy based on hunting, fishing, and trapping. Since the place is north of the Arctic tree line, driftwood brought by the Indigirka was used for construction and for firewood.

Due to the remarkable geographic isolation of the settlement, its residents preserved much of their ancestors' beliefs, customs, and folklore into the 19th and 20th century, which made Russkoye Ustye a favorite destination for Russian ethnographers and cultural anthropologists, such as Gerhard von Maydell. Linguists visited the place to study the local dialect of Russian, strongly influenced by the Even language.

It is speculated that the original settlers, possibly of Pomor origin, arrived to the delta of the Indigirka as early as the first half of the 17th century. More skeptical researchers believe that the second half of the 17th century would be a more likely time for the initial settlement. According to a locally recorded legend, the villagers' ancestors originally left European Russia during Ivan the Terrible's persecution campaigns in the late 16th century, although, as Rasputin suggests, reaching the Indigirka may have taken them a long time.

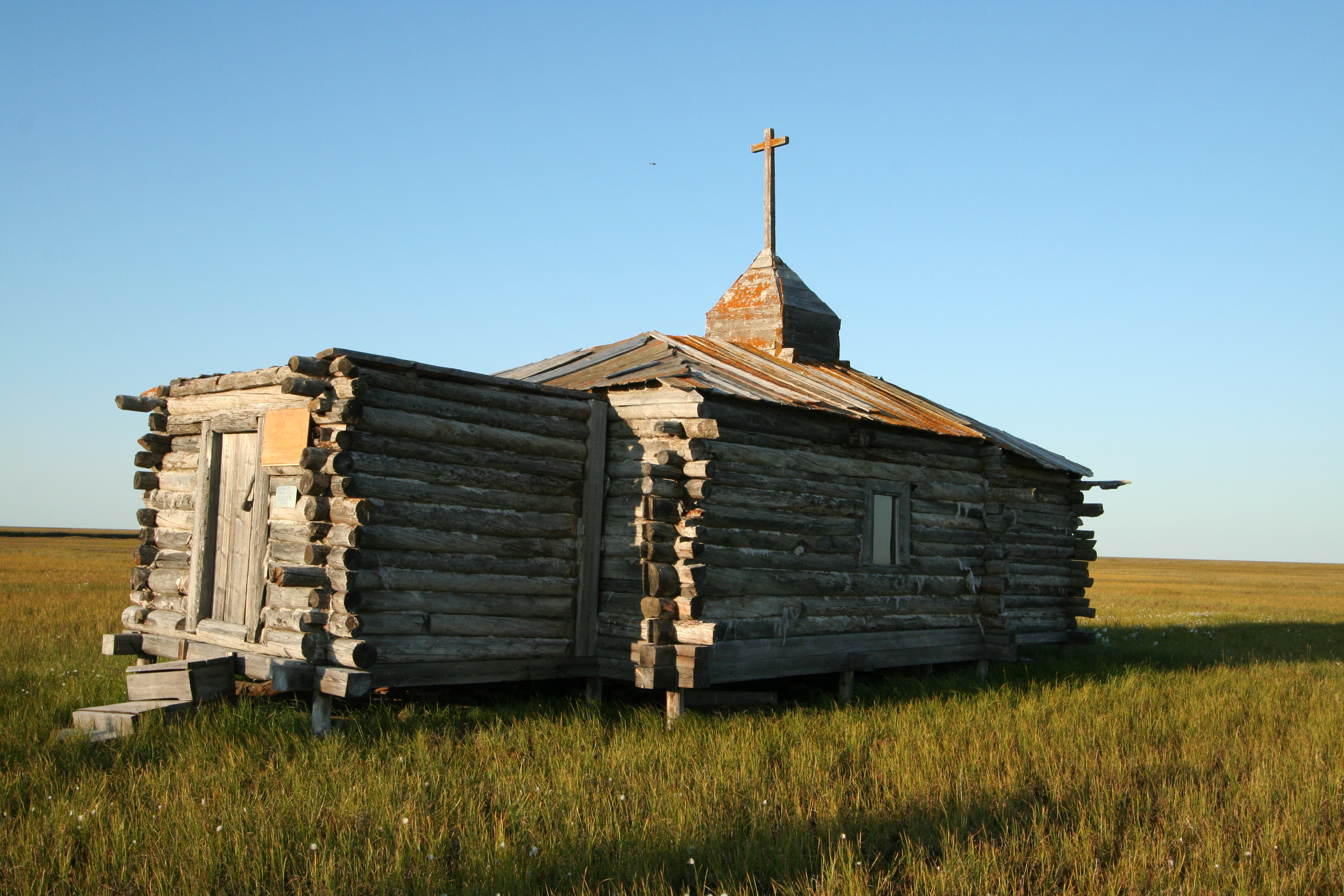
A church in Russkoye Ustye

The first known record of the community of Russkoye Ustye is in the reports of the explorer Dmitry Laptev, who had to spend a winter there in 1739 when his boat was stuck in the ice. A Socialist Revolutionary, Vladimir Zenzinov, gave an account of his visit in the early 1900s during his Siberian exile.

It was only between 1928 (when a schoolhouse was built and a schoolteacher arrived from the outside world) and the 1960s (the arrival of helicopters) that Russkoye Ustye became reconnected, to an extent, with the "mainland" culture and integrated into the national economy. The pelts of Arctic fox became the principal product sold by the residents to the outside world.

Historically, the peoples of Russkoye Ustye were spread out over tens of kilometers, living in solitary houses or tiny hamlets of three to four houses (there were six houses in the hamlet where Zenzinov stayed). Around 1940–1942, the authorities arranged for them to move into a single location, which was given the name Polyarnoye. However, the inhabitants continued to refer to it colloquially as Russkoye Ustye, and this name was officially restored in 1988.

A Siberian writer, Valentin Rasputin, dedicated a chapter of his non-fiction book, "Siberia, Siberia" (originally published in 1991) to the people of this isolated traditional community. Even though the locals "seemed to be fashioned entirely out of prejudice", he favorably compares their ability to pass moral judgments with the moral relativism of the modern people.

== Climate ==
Russkoye Ustye has a tundra climate (ET) with short, chilly summers and long, bitterly cold winters.

Climate data for Russkoye Ustye
Month	Jan	Feb	Mar	Apr	May	Jun	Jul	Aug	Sep	Oct	Nov	Dec	Year
Record high °C (°F)	−8.0 (17.6)	−13.3 (8.1)	−7.1 (19.2)	−2.0 (28.4)	12.0 (53.6)	24.0 (75.2)	28.9 (84.0)	27.4 (81.3)	18.0 (64.4)	5.0 (41.0)	−3.8 (25.2)	−7.8 (18.0)	28.9 (84.0)
Mean daily maximum °C (°F)	−29.2 (−20.6)	−30.8 (−23.4)	−27.0 (−16.6)	−17.3 (0.9)	−5.3 (22.5)	6.7 (44.1)	11.7 (53.1)	8.9 (48.0)	2.9 (37.2)	−10.3 (13.5)	−22.5 (−8.5)	−28.5 (−19.3)	−13.1 (8.4)
Daily mean °C (°F)	−32.8 (−27.0)	−34.5 (−30.1)	−31.2 (−24.2)	−22.1 (−7.8)	−8.5 (16.7)	3.7 (38.7)	7.9 (46.2)	5.7 (42.3)	0.6 (33.1)	−13.4 (7.9)	−26.2 (−15.2)	−32.0 (−25.6)	−16.6 (2.1)
Mean daily minimum °C (°F)	−36.6 (−33.9)	−38.3 (−36.9)	−35.7 (−32.3)	−27.8 (−18.0)	−12.7 (9.1)	0.6 (33.1)	4.2 (39.6)	2.9 (37.2)	−1.5 (29.3)	−16.7 (1.9)	−29.9 (−21.8)	−35.6 (−32.1)	−20.4 (−4.7)
Record low °C (°F)	−48.4 (−55.1)	−51.0 (−59.8)	−47.4 (−53.3)	−42.2 (−44.0)	−29.0 (−20.2)	−25.0 (−13.0)	−3.9 (25.0)	−5.1 (22.8)	−17.0 (1.4)	−35.8 (−32.4)	−42.2 (−44.0)	−48.6 (−55.5)	−51.0 (−59.8)
Average precipitation mm (inches)	11.3 (0.44)	6.4 (0.25)	5.1 (0.20)	7.5 (0.30)	32.8 (1.29)	21.9 (0.86)	27.9 (1.10)	31.2 (1.23)	28.8 (1.13)	13.1 (0.52)	14.1 (0.56)	5.8 (0.23)	205.9 (8.11)
