= Bolshaya Ercha =

River in Yakutia, Russia

Bolshaya Ercha Большая Эрча
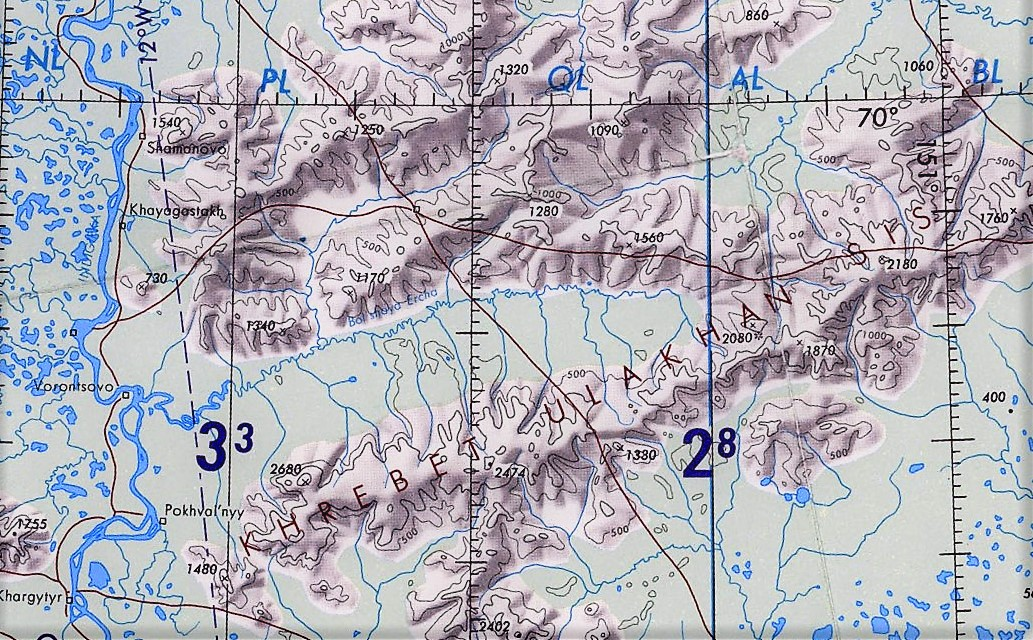
- Bolshaya Ercha course ONC map section

- Mouth location in Yakutia, Russia

Location
- Country: Russia

Physical characteristics
- Source
  - location: Ulakhan-Sis
  - coordinates: 69°39′00″N 150°13′13″E
- Mouth: Indigirka
  - coordinates: 69°34′05″N 147°38′10″E
  - elevation: 51 metres (167 ft)
- Length: 252 km (157 mi)
- Basin size: 4,290 km^{2} (1,660 sq mi)

Basin features
- Progression: Indigirka → Laptev Sea

The Bolshaya Ercha (Russian: Большая Эрча) is a river in the Sakha Republic (Yakutia), Russia. It is a tributary of the Indigirka. The river has a length of 252 kilometres (157 mi) and a drainage basin area of 4,290 square kilometres (1,660 mi^{2}).

The river flows north of the Arctic Circle, across desolate territories of the Allaikhovsky District.

== Course ==
The Bolshaya Ercha is a right tributary of the Indigirka. It has its sources in the northern slopes of the Ulakhan-Sis range. The river flows first northwestwards in its uppermost section, and then in a roughly western / WSW direction skirting the Kondakov Plateau which rises to the north. In its last stretch the river descends into the Indigirka floodplain among numerous lakes where it meanders strongly, forming oxbow lakes. Finally the Bolshaya Ercha joins the Indigirka 354 km (220 mi) from its mouth. Now uninhabited Vorontsovo village lies near the confluence, on the facing bank of the Indigirka.

=== Tributaries ===
The main tributary of the Bolshaya Ercha is the 101 km (63 mi) long Malaya Ercha on the right, as well as the 40 km (25 mi) long Kusagan-Yurekh (Кусаган-Юрэх), the 36 km (22 mi) long At-Khaya (Ат-Хайа), the 42 km (26 mi) long Kistike (Кистикэ) and the 36 km (22 mi) long Erkichan (Эркичан) on the left. The river is frozen between the beginning of October and the beginning of June. There are more than 600 lakes in its basin.

== See also ==
- List of rivers of Russia
