= Ulakhan-Sis Range =

Mountain range in Sakha Republic, Russia

- Улахан-Сис
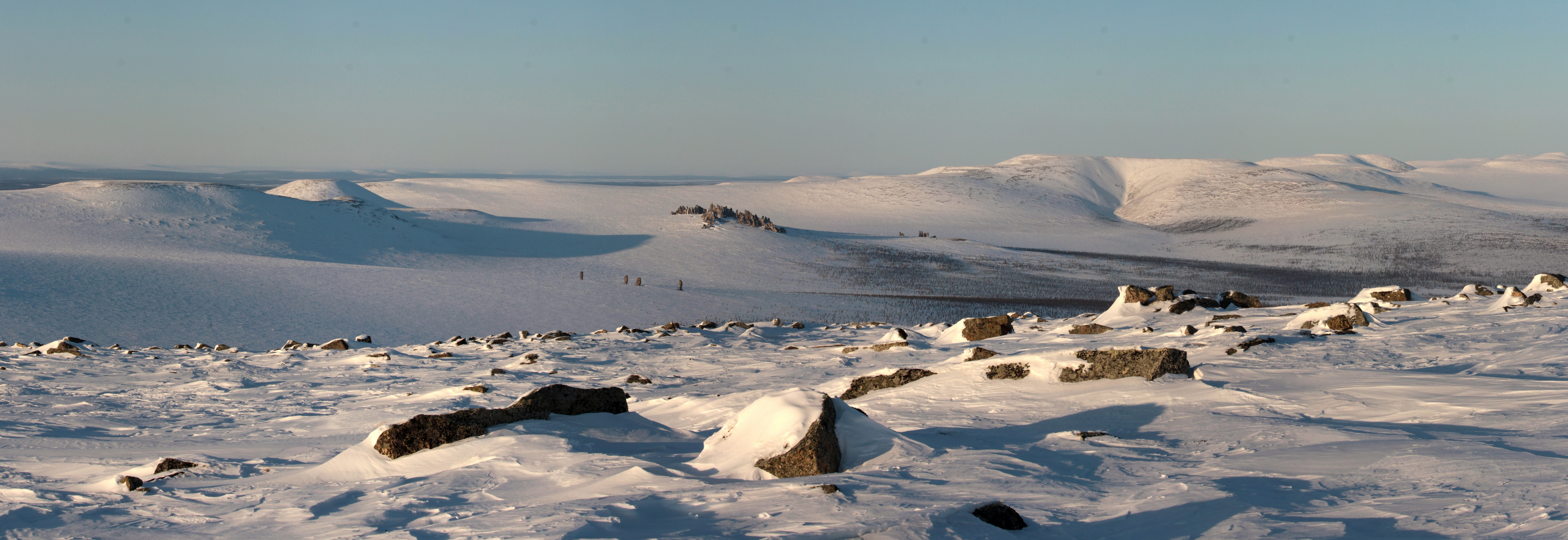
- Panorama of the range

Highest point
- Peak: Vilka
- Elevation: 754 m (2,474 ft)

Dimensions
- Length: 160 km (99 mi)

Geography
- Location within Sakha Republic
- Country: Russia
- Federal subject: Sakha Republic
- Range coordinates: 69°30′N 149°42′E
- Parent range: East Siberian System

Geology
- Rock age: Devonian
- Rock type(s): Granite, sandstone, effusive rock

The Ulakhan-Sis Range (Russian: Улахан-Сис; Yakut: Улахан Сис) is a mountain range in the Sakha Republic, Far Eastern Federal District, Russia.

This range is one of the areas of Yakutia where baydzharakhs are found. Kigilyakh rock formations are also found on this range.

== History ==
The Ulakhan-Sis was first mapped in the summer of 1870 by geographer and ethnologist Baron Gerhard von Maydell (1835–1894) during his pioneering research of East Siberia.

Kular is an abandoned settlement that was located in the range area.

== Geography ==
The Ulakhan-Sis Range rises in the southeastern limits of the Yana-Indigirka Lowland, northwest and west of the Kolyma Lowland and northeast of the Aby Lowland, along the interfluve of the Erna and Shandrin rivers in the northwest, Shangina in the south, and Khatysty and Arga-Yuryakh in the southeast.

The main ridge stretches in a roughly east/west direction from the western end of the smaller Suor Uyata (Суор-Уята) to the east and the headwaters of the Sundrun River to the Indigirka for approximately 160 kilometers (99 mi). The highest peak is 754 metres (2,474 ft) high Vilka. To the north rises the Kondakov Plateau, a lower and wider extension of the range. In the west, the Polousny Range, a prolongation of the range on the other side of the Indigirka River, stretches further westwards. To the south, at a certain distance, rises the Alazeya Plateau. Rivers Bolshaya Ercha, a tributary of the Indigirka, and Arga-Yuryakh, of the Alazeya basin, have their sources in the range.

The range has mountains of middle height and smooth slopes with larch forests at the bottom of the valleys.

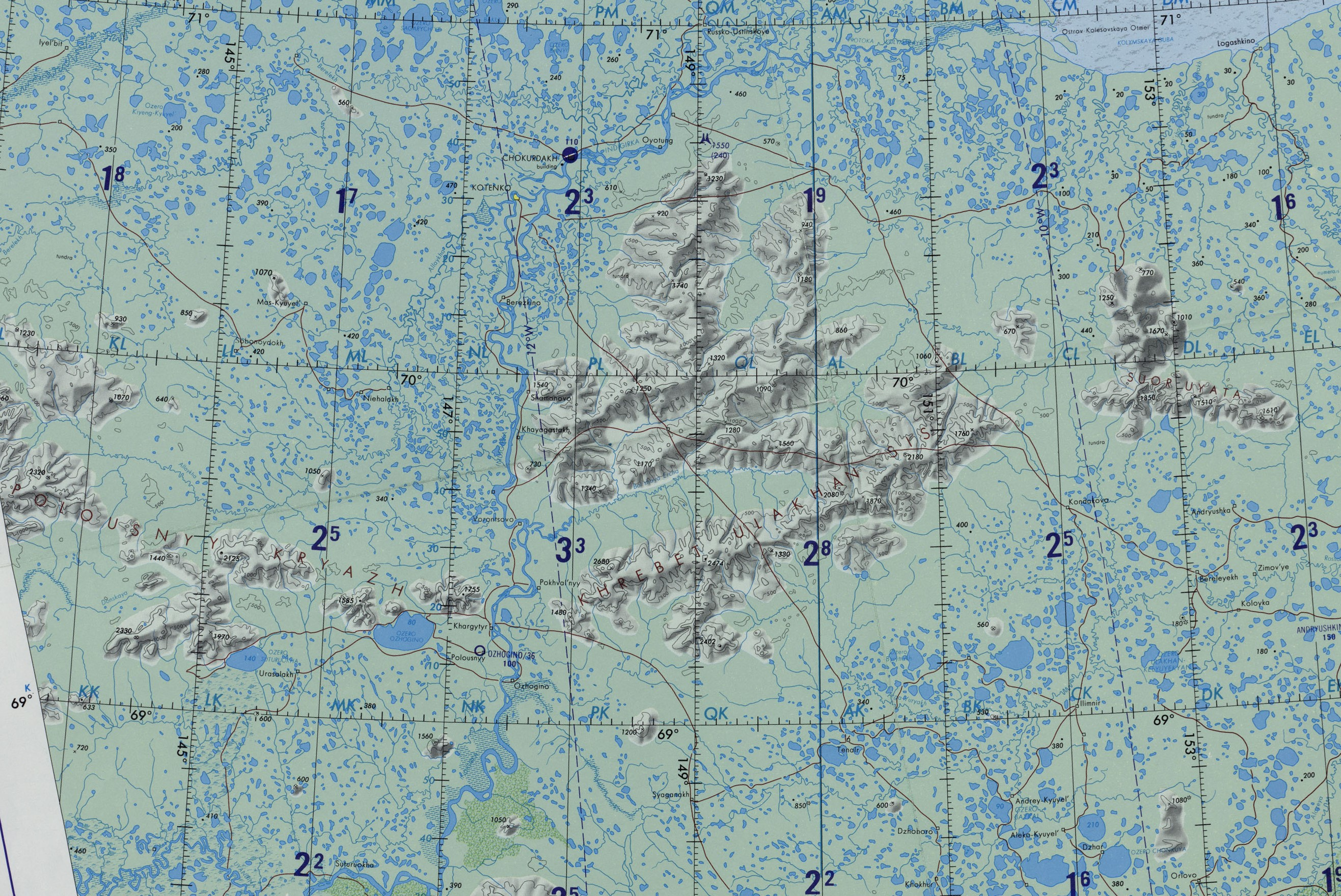
Ulakhan-Sis Range map section.

== Gallery ==
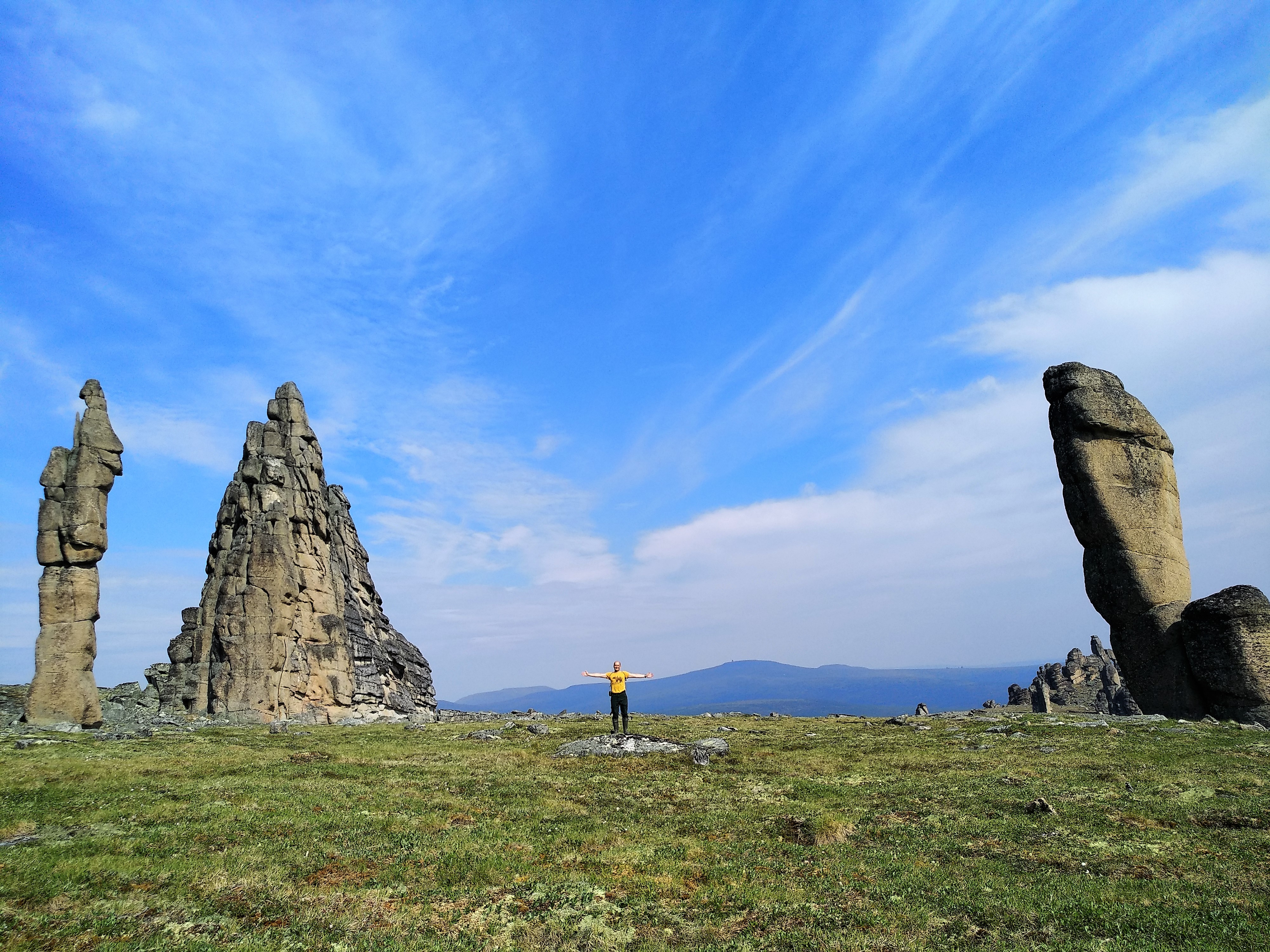
Cliffs shaped by cryogenic weathering

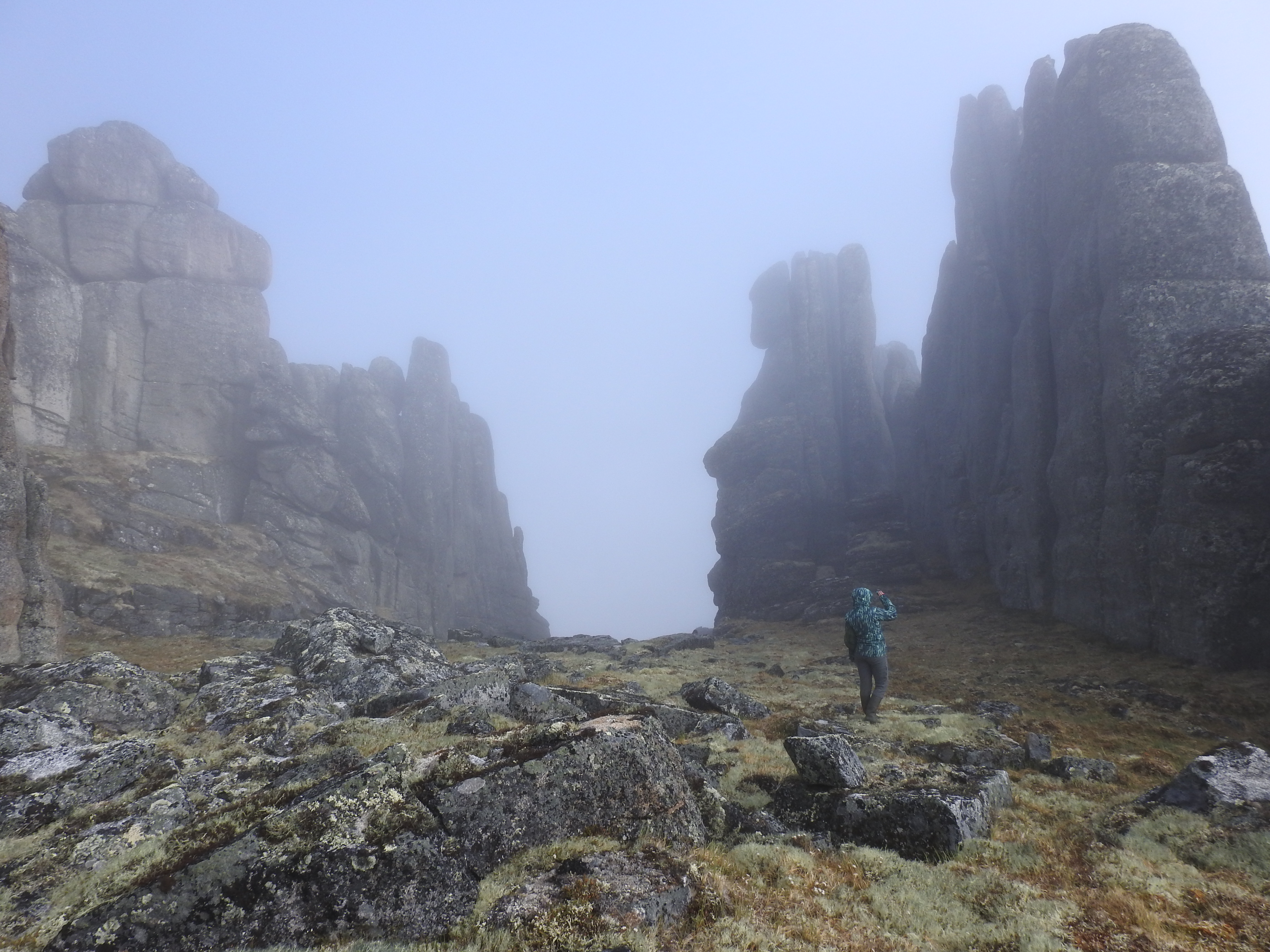
The rock formations evoke scenes from science fiction films

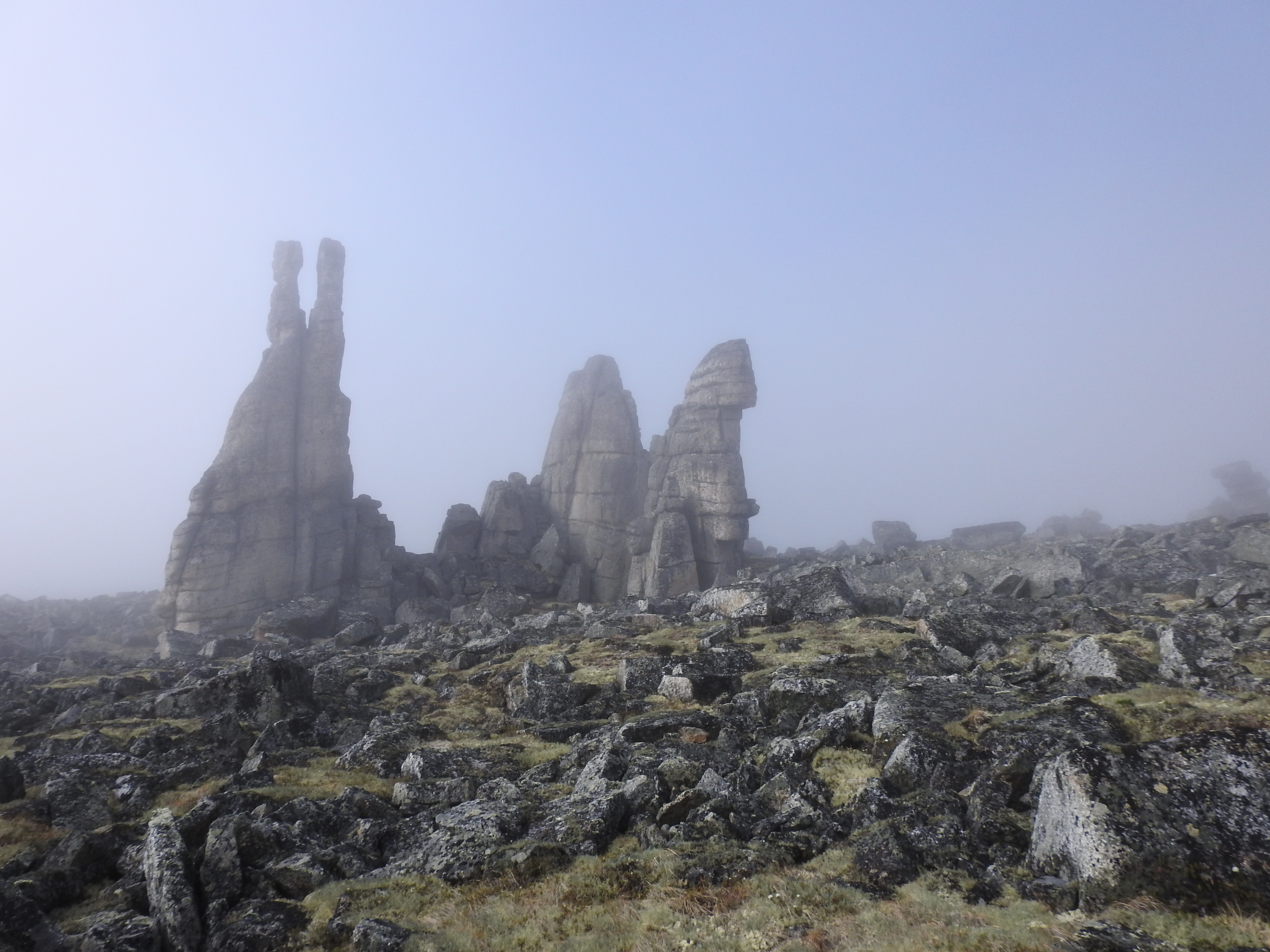
Bizzare rock pillars formed by weathering and erosion

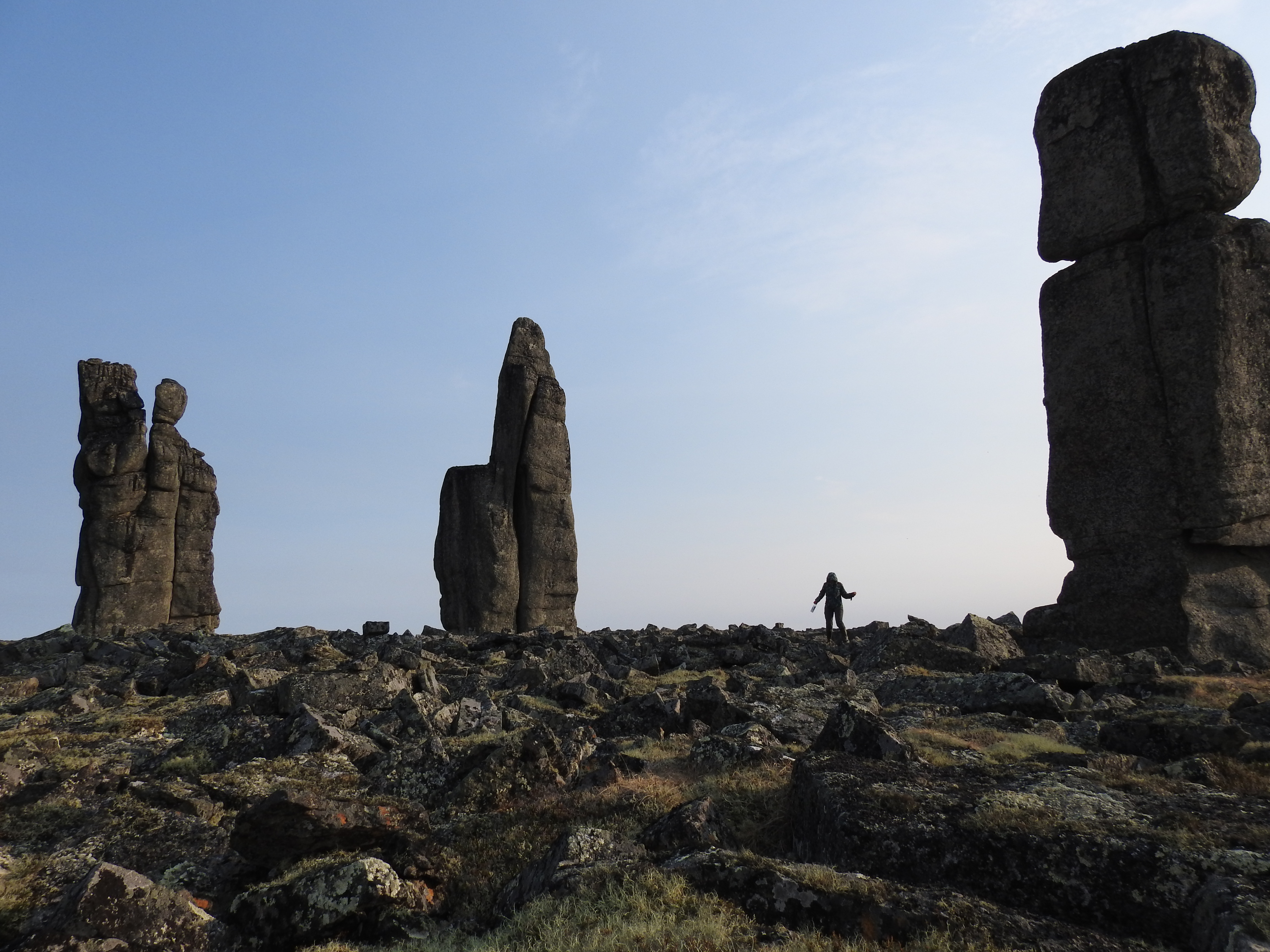
Human figure dwarfed by huge rock giants

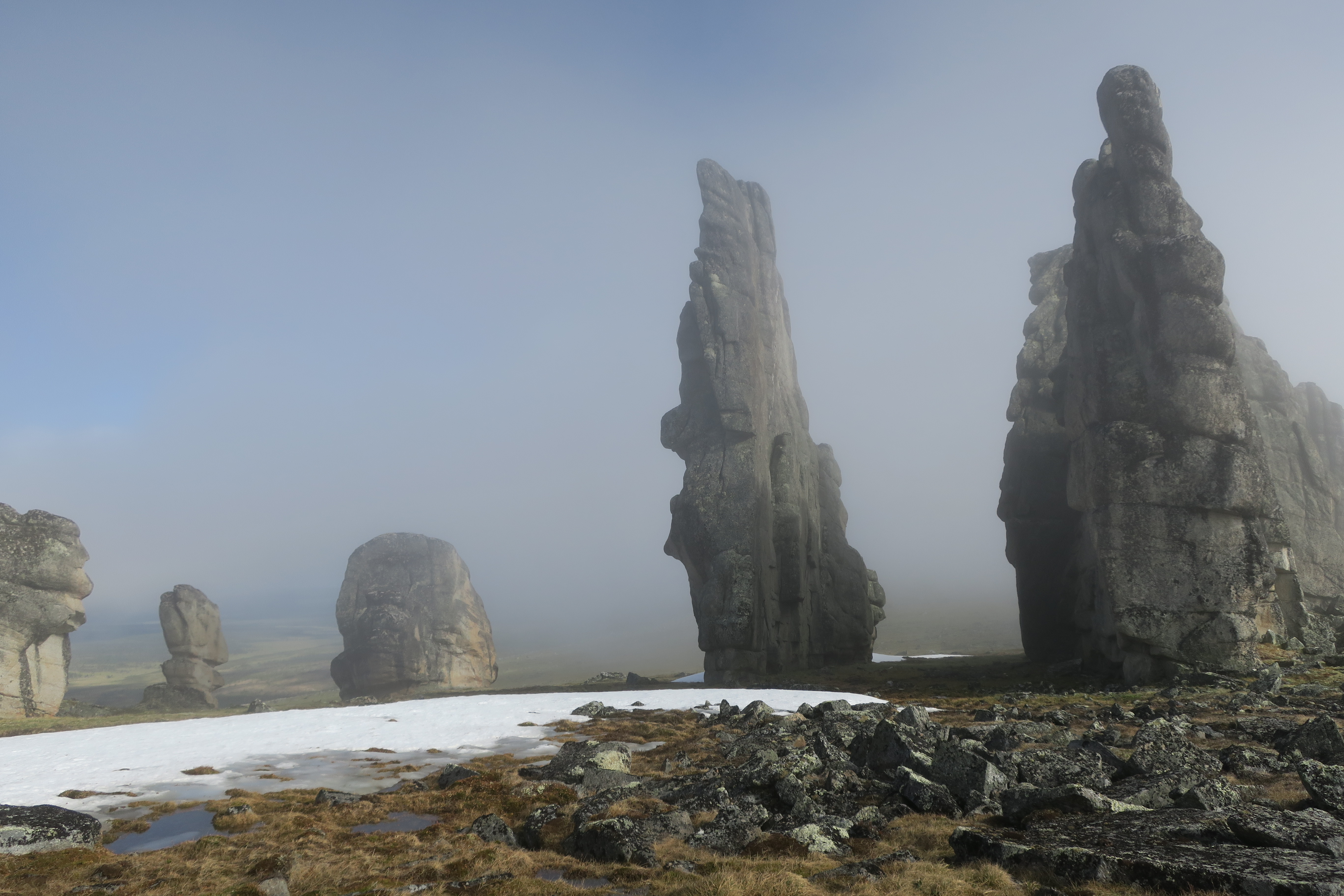
Rock towers of the Ulakhan-Sis Range

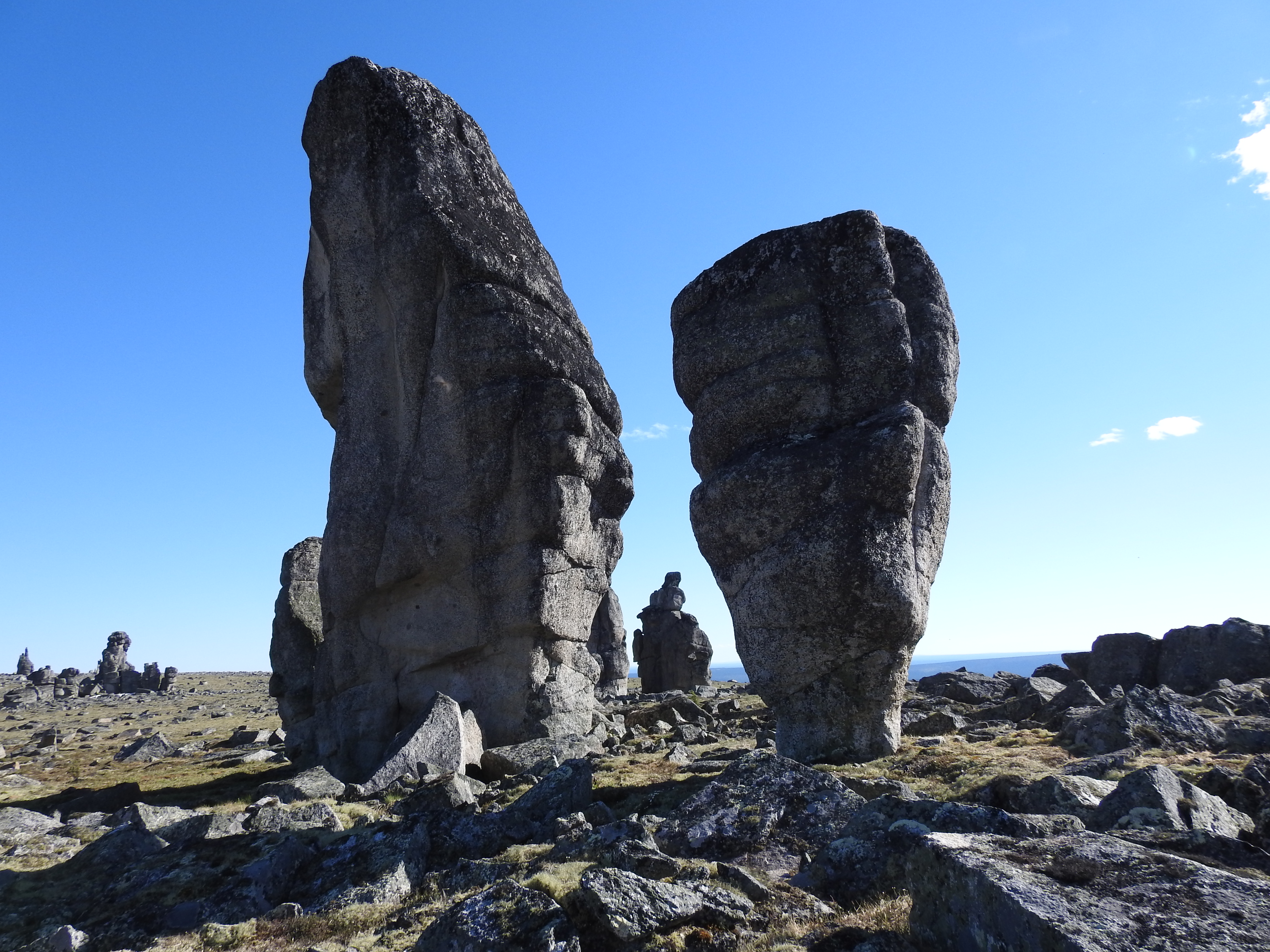
Scenic rock formations of the Ulakhan-Sis Range

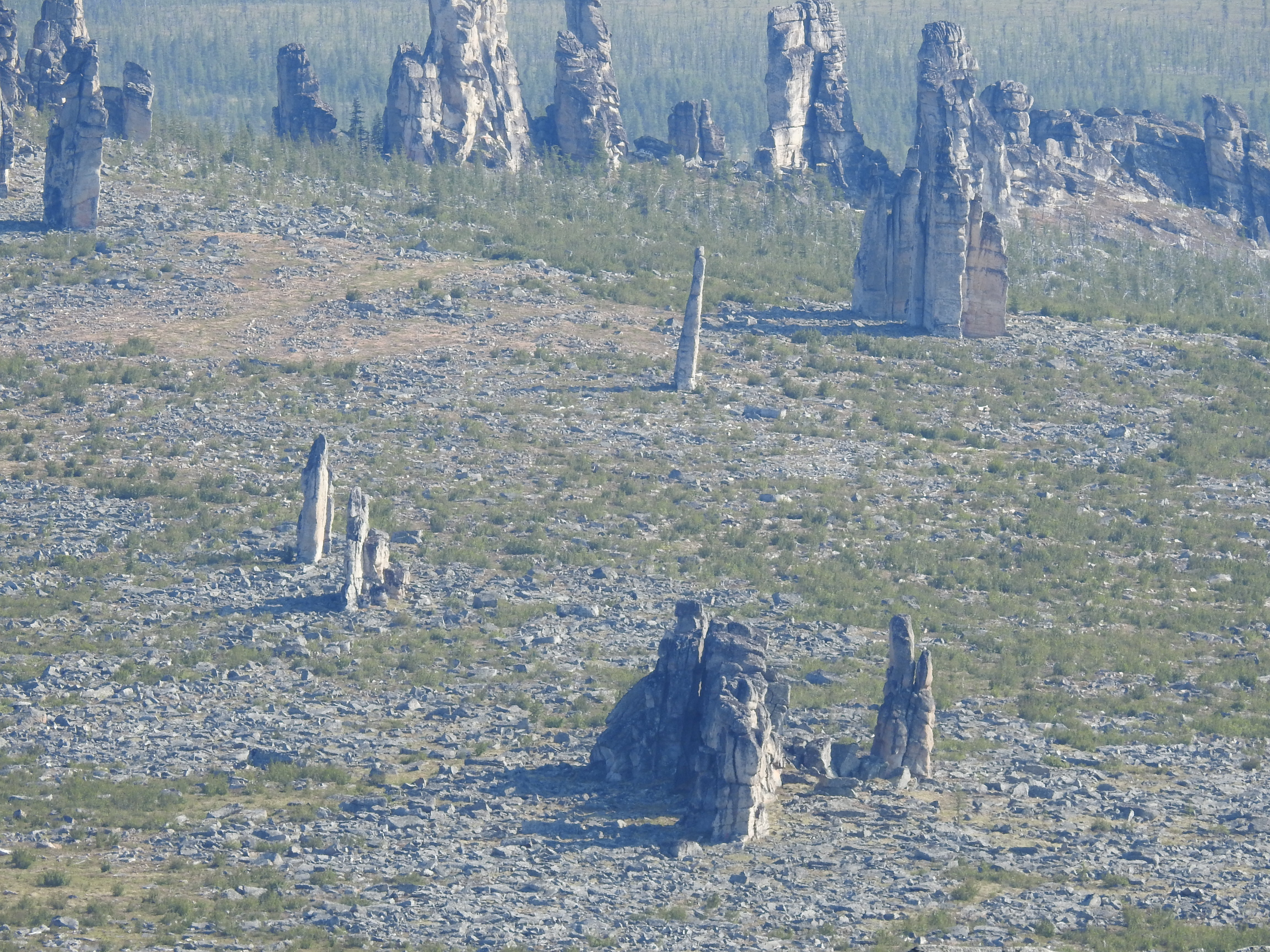
Kigilyakhs dot Arctic tundra

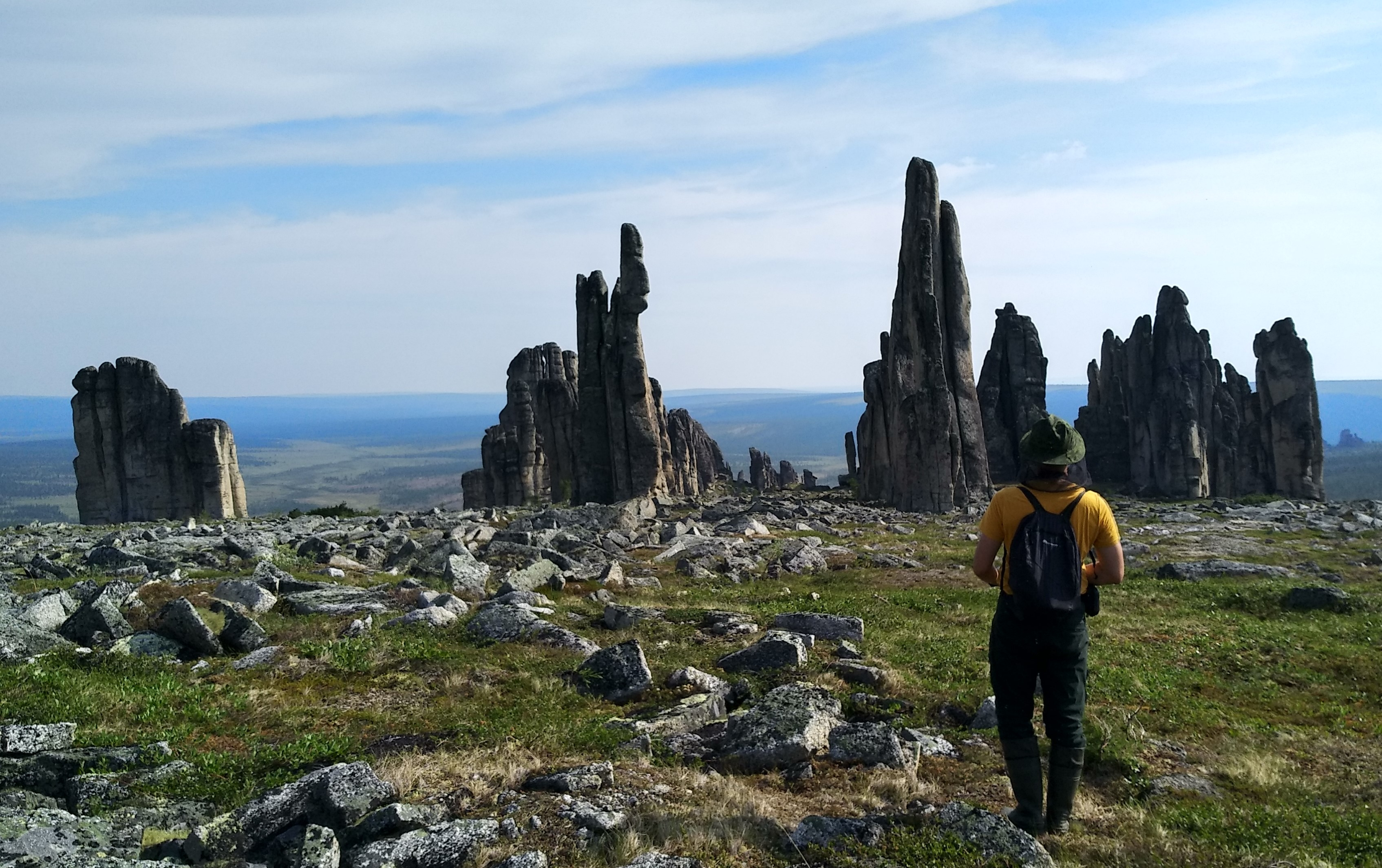
Natural monoliths formed by cryogenic weathering north of Arctic Circle
