= Alazeya Plateau =

Plateau in the country of Russia

- Алазейское плоскогорье
- Location within Sakha Republic

Highest point
- Peak: Unnamed
- Elevation: 954 m (3,130 ft)

Dimensions
- Length: 300 km (190 mi)
- Width: 200 km (120 mi)

Geography
- Country: Russia
- Federal subject: Sakha Republic
- Range coordinates: 67°38′N 147°50′E
- Parent range: East Siberian System

Geology
- Rock ages: Proterozoic and Devonian
- Rock types: Gneiss, Sedimentary rocks, granite and syenite

The Alazeya Plateau (Russian: Алазейское плоскогорье) is a mountain plateau in the Sakha Republic, Far Eastern Federal District, Russia. The area is named after river Alazeya, which has its source in the plateau.

There are kigilyakhs in the Alazeya Plateau. The particularity of the kigilyakhs found in this location is that their lower part (corresponding to the legs) is thinner than the upper part.

== Geography ==
The Alazeya Plateau is located in eastern Sakha Republic, between the Indigirka, Kolyma, Alazeya and Ozhogina rivers. The average height of the plateau surface is around 350 meters (1,150 ft). There are slightly higher tableland type elevations cutting across the plateau area; the highest point is a 954 metres (3,130 ft) high unnamed summit.

The plateau is limited by the Yana-Indigirka Lowland, including the Aby Lowland, to the west, with Yana and Indigirka rivers located there; the Ozhogina to the south; and the Kolyma Lowland, where the Kolyma flows, to the east and northeast. Besides the Alazeya, the Sededema and the Shangina also have their sources in the plateau.

There are forests of larch in the lower areas and mountain tundra in the higher altitudes.
