= Olenegorsk, Sakha Republic =

Locality in Yukagirsky Rural Okrug, Allaikhovsky District, Yakutia, Russia

Olenegorsk Оленегорск Оленегорскай (Sakha)
- Selo
- Interactive map of Olenegorsk
- Location of Olenegorsk Olenegorsk (Sakha Republic)
- Coordinates: 69°48′35″N 147°29′51″E
- Country: Russia
- Federal subject: Sakha Republic
- Administrative district: Allaikhovsky District
- Rural okrugSelsoviet: Yukagirsky Rural Okrug

Population (2010 Census)
  - Total: 254
  - Estimate (2021): 198 (−22%)

Administrative status
  - Capital of: Yukagirsky Rural Okrug

Municipal status
  - Municipal district: Allaikhovsky Municipal District
  - Rural settlement: Yukagirsky Rural Settlement
  - Capital of: Yukagirsky Rural Settlement
- Time zone: UTC+11 (UTC+11:00)
- Postal code: 678803
- OKTMO ID: 98606476101

Olenegorsk (Russian: Оленегорск; Yakut: Оленегорскай) is a rural locality (a selo), the only inhabited locality, and the administrative centre of Yukagirsky Rural Okrug of Allaikhovsky District in the Sakha Republic, Russia, located 140 kilometers (87 mi) from Chokurdakh, the administrative centre of the district. Its population as of the 2010 Census was 254; down from 308 recorded in the 2002 Census.
