= Kondakov Plateau =

Mountain plateau in the Sakha Republic, Russia

- Кондаковское плоскогорье Кондаков хаптал хайалаах сирэ
- Location within Sakha Republic

Highest point
- Peak: Punga Khaya
- Elevation: 498 m (1,634 ft)

Dimensions
- Length: 200 km (120 mi)
- Width: 150 km (93 mi)

Geography
- Country: Russia
- Federal subject: Sakha Republic
- Range coordinates: 70°0′N 149°0′E
- Parent range: East Siberian System

Geology
- Rock age: Upper Jurassic
- Rock type(s): Sandstone, siltstone and schist

Climbing
- Easiest route: From Chokurdakh

The Kondakov Plateau (Russian: Кондаковское плоскогорье; Yakut: Кондаков хаптал хайалаах сирэ) is a mountain plateau in the Sakha Republic, Far Eastern Federal District, Russia. The town of Chokurdakh is located on the other bank of the Indigirka, facing the plateau. The nearest airport is Chokurdakh Airport.

The Shandrin mammoth was discovered in 1974 at the feet of a steep slope in the eastern side of the Kondakov Plateau by geologist B. S. Rusanov of the Yakutsk Institute of Geology.

== Geography ==
The Kondakov Plateau is located in eastern Yakutia, rising above the right banks of the lower course of the Indigirka and gradually decreasing in elevation to the east. Slopes are generally smooth and gentle and the average height of the plateau surface is between 150 meters (490 ft) and 300 meters (980 ft). There are slightly higher ridges cutting across the plateau area, the Bonga-Taga ridge in the north and the Mokholukan in the south. The highest point is 498 metres (1,634 ft) high Punga Khaya located in the western part.

The plateau is limited by the Yana-Indigirka Lowland to the west, with the delta of the Indigirka to the north. To the south it is bound by the Ulakhan-Sis Range and by the Kolyma Lowland to the east.

=== Hydrography ===
The Kondakov Plateau is crossed by rivers Shandrin to the east and the Sundrun with some of its upper course tributaries, as well as by the Bolshaya Ercha, a tributary of the Indigirka. The Malaya Ercha —the largest tributary of the Bolshaya Ercha, the Keremesit, as well as the Okhotnya and Barn-Yuryakh —tributaries of the Sakhartymay, have their sources in the plateau.

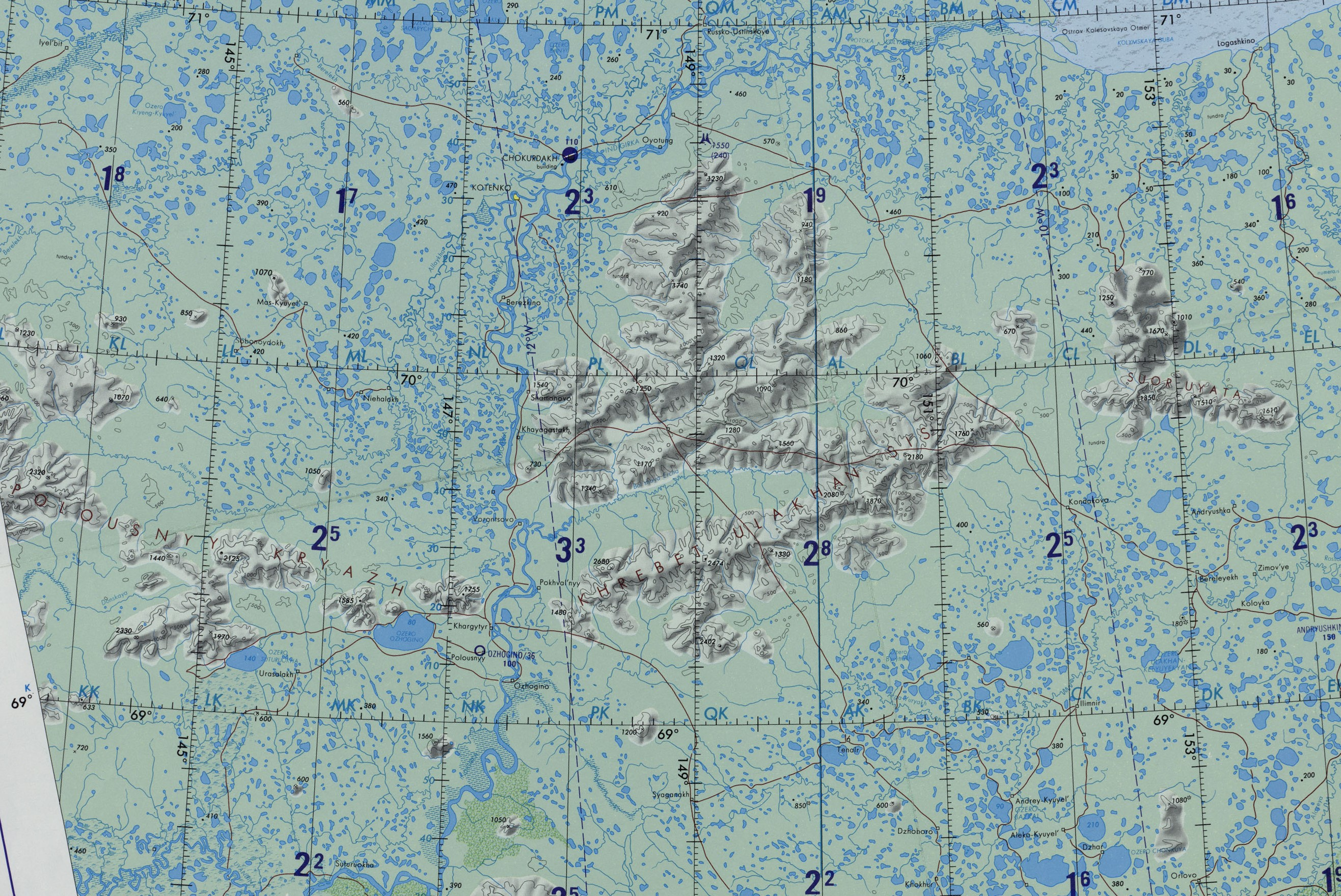
The Kondakov Plateau north of the Ulakhan-Sis Range.

== Flora and fauna ==
Permafrost prevails in the area of the Kondakov Plateau. The surface of the uplands is markedly dissected by river valleys in which there are forests of larch and forest tundra, especially in the southern part. Its higher elevations are covered with mountain tundra vegetation.

The Kondakov Plateau area is part of the migration corridor of the Sundrun reindeer population, which includes the adjoining Suor Uyata to the southeast, and the forest tundra of the Rossokha River basin to the east.

== Climate ==
The plateau has a harsh subarctic climate. The average temperature is −12 °C (10 °F). The coldest temperatures, down to −30 °C (−22 °F), have been recorded in February. In summer the average July temperature in the valleys does not exceed 14 °C (57 °F).

== Geology ==
Geologically the plateau is composed of sandstones, siltstones and schists of the Upper Jurassic. Andesites and basalts are present in some exposed crust parts of the plateau, where the local type of agate with a parallel-layered pattern can also be found.
