= Indigirka =

River in Sakha, Russia

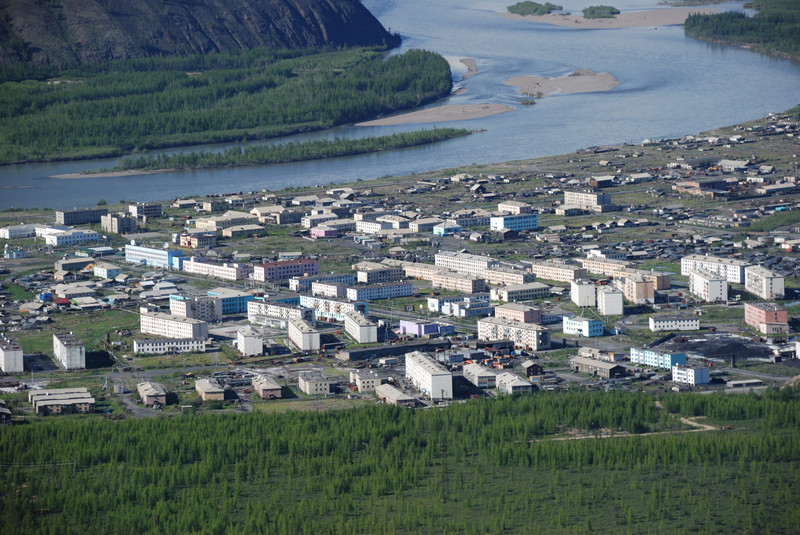
- At Ust-Nera

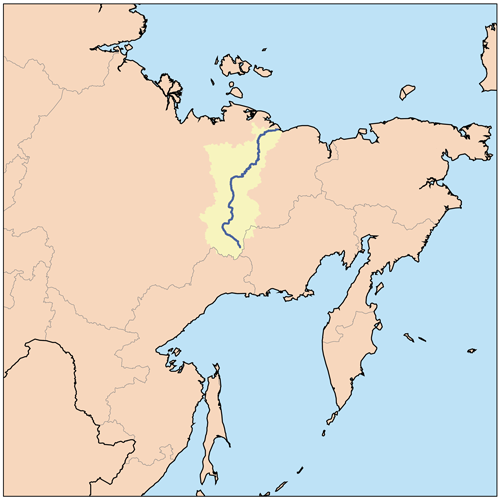

Location
- Country: Russia

Physical characteristics
- Source: Confluence of the Tuora-Yuryakh and Taryn-Yuryakh
  - elevation: 792 metres (2,598 ft)
- Mouth: East Siberian Sea
  - coordinates: 71.4422°N 150.8608°E
- Length: 1,726 km (1,072 mi)
- Basin size: 360,400 km^{2} (139,200 mi^{2})
- Discharge
  - average: 1,810 m^{3}/s (64,000 cu ft/s)

The Indigirka (Russian: Индиги́рка; Yakut: Индигиир, romanized: İndigiir) is a river in the Sakha Republic in Russia between the Yana to the west and the Kolyma to the east. It is 1,726 kilometres (1,072 mi) long. The area of its basin is 360,000 square kilometres (140,000 mi^{2}).

== History ==
The isolated village of Russkoye Ustye, located on the delta of the Indigirka, is known for the unique traditional culture of the Russian settlers whose ancestors came there several centuries ago. Some historians have speculated that Russkoye Ustye was settled by Pomors in the early 17th century.

In 1638 explorer Ivan Rebrov reached the Indigirka. In 1636–42 Elisei Buza pioneered the overland route to the Indigirka river system. At about the same time, Poznik Ivanov ascended a tributary of the lower Lena, crossed the Verkhoyansk Range to the upper Yana, and then crossed the Chersky Range to the Indigirka. In 1642 Mikhail Stadukhin reached the Indigirka overland from the Lena.

Zashiversk on the Indigirka was an important colonial outpost during the early days of Russian colonization. It was subsequently abandoned in the 19th century. Other historical settlements, now long abandoned, were Podshiversk and Uyandinskoye Zimovye.

In 1892–94 Baron Eduard Von Toll carried out geological surveys in the basin of the Indigirka (among other Far-eastern Siberian rivers) on behalf of the Russian Academy of Sciences. During one year and two days the expedition covered 25,000 kilometres (16,000 mi), of which 4,200 kilometres (2,600 mi) were up rivers, carrying out geodesic surveys en route.

== Course ==
It originates at the confluence of the 251 kilometres (156 mi) long Tuora-Yuryakh (also known as Khastakh, Khalkan or Kalkan) river and the 63 kilometres (39 mi) long Taryn-Yuryakh, both of which originate on the slopes of the Khalkan Range.

In its higher course, the river flows northwestwards along the Yana-Oymyakon Highlands, through the lowest part of the Oymyakon Plateau. Turning north, it cuts through several subranges of the Chersky Range. At the point where it crosses the Chemalgin Range the river narrows and flows into a deep gorge, forming rapids. Where it is joined by the Moma river from the southeast, the Indigirka reaches the Momo-Selennyakh Depression, a wide intermontane basin, and the middle course of the river begins, where its valley expands. Turning northwards, the Indigirka cuts deeply across the Moma Range and flows northeastwards meandering across the Aby Lowland and widening to 500 m (1,600 ft). After flowing between the neck formed by the eastern end of the Polousny Range and the western end of the Ulakhan-Chistay Range, it flows north with the Kondakov Plateau to the east across the Yana-Indigirka Lowland, part of the greater East Siberian Lowland. Further north, where the terrain becomes completely flat, the Indigirka divides into branches 130 km (81 mi) from the mouth, forming a 5,500 km^{2} (2,100 sq mi) wide delta. Its waters end up in the Kolyma Bay, East Siberian Sea. Gusinaya Bay is located to the northwest of the mouths of the Indigirka.

The Indigirka freezes up in October and stays under the ice until May–June.

=== Tributaries ===
The main tributaries of the Indigirka are, from source to mouth:

- Khastakh (Tuora-Yuryakh) (left)
- Taryn-Yuryakh (right)
- Kuydusun (left)
- Kyuyente (left)
- Elgi (left)
- Nera (right)
- Chibagalakh (left)
- Moma (right)
- Selennyakh (left)
- Druzhina (left)
- Badyarikha (right)
- Uyandina (left)
- Shangina (right)
- Bolshaya Ercha (right)
- Allaikha (left)
- Byoryolyokh (left, into Russko-Ustyinskaya)
- Shandrin (right, into Kolymskaya)

== Ports, settlements and economy ==
Main ports on the river are:

- Khonuu
- Druzhina
- Chokurdakh
- Tabor

There is a gold prospecting industry in the Indigirka basin. Ust-Nera, a gold-mining center, is the largest settlement on the river.

The Indigirka teems with a variety of fishes. Among the most valuable are several whitefish species, such as vendace, chir, muksun, inconnu (nelma), omul, etc.

== Mouths ==
The Indigirka forms a large delta, consisting of a number of streams (each one being labeled on Russian maps as a протока (protóka) (river arm)) and islands. About 100 kilometres (62 mi) before reaching the East Siberian Sea (70.8126°N 148.9162°E), the river splits into two major northeast-flowing streams. The left (westernmost) arm is known as the Russko-Ustyinskaya Protoka; the right arm, the Srednyaya Protoka (Russian for the "Middle Arm"). Further downstream, the third major arm, the Kolymskaya Protoka splits off the Srednyaya Protoka as its right (eastern) distributary, thus justifying the "middle" moniker for the Srednyaya Protoka.

While Srednyaya Protoka means the "Middle Arm", the names of the main western and eastern arms indicate their relative location as well. The Kolymskaya Protoka, or Kolymskoye Ustye is the arm one located on the eastern side, i.e. the "Kolyma side" of the delta (the arm closest to the Kolyma, the eastern neighbor of the Indigirka). The Russko-Ustyinskaya Protoka, apparently known earlier as simply Russkoye Ustye is the arm one located on the western side, i.e. the "Russian side" of the delta (meaning, the side closest to the (European) Russia). These days the name of the Russko-Ustyinskaya Protoka appears as if it were formed from the name of the old Russian village Russkoye Ustye situated there, but originally the opposite is likely to have been the case, the village is named after the river arm (the Russkoye Ustye) on which it was located.

Several flat islands are formed by the channels of the delta. Listed from the east to the west, the major ones are:

- Usun-Ary 71.387°N 151.255°E lies longitudinally along the coast east of the Srednyaya mouth. It is 12 kilometres (7 mi) and 2.7 kilometres (1.7 mi) wide.
- Uparovskiy Island 71.582°N 151.196°E lies completely detached 11 kilometres (7 mi) offshore from the Srednyaya mouth. It is about 2 kilometres (1.2 mi) long and 1 km wide.
- Ploskiy Island 71.480°N 150.890°E is the farthest offshore of a cluster of islands at the Srednyaya mouth. It is C-shaped and about 3 km long.
- Bolshoy Fedorovskiy 71.533°N 150.510°E lies between the two mouths of the Indigirka. It is 6 km long and has a maximum width of 4 km.
- Vkodnoy and Oleniy islands lie right at the Prot. Russko Ust'inskaya mouth 71.546°N 150.266°E. Both are of similar size, about 4 km in length.
- Krestovyy Island 71.447°N 149.766°E lies quiet isolated directly to the south of the Lopatka Peninsula, 10 kilometres (6 mi) offshore to the northwest of the main Indigirka mouths. It is 6 km long and 1.6 km wide.

== See also ==
- Cave lion cubs Boris and Sparta, found on the banks of the Tirekhtyakh tributary
- List of rivers of Russia
- Yana-Oymyakon Highlands§Hydrography
