= Chokurdakh =

Chokurdakh Чокурдах
- Urban-type settlement

Other transcription(s)
  - Yakut: Чокуурдаах
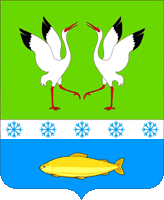
- Coat of arms
- Interactive map of Chokurdakh
- Location of Chokurdakh Chokurdakh (Sakha Republic)
- Coordinates: 70°37′18″N 147°54′30″E
- Country: Russia
- Federal subject: Sakha Republic
- Administrative district: Allaikhovsky District
- SettlementSelsoviet: Settlement of Chokurdakh
- Founded: 1936
- Urban-type settlement status since: 1981

Population (2010 Census)
  - Total: 2,367
  - Estimate (January 2016): 2,068 (−12.6%)

Administrative status
  - Capital of: Allaikhovsky District, Settlement of Chokurdakh

Municipal status
  - Municipal district: Allaikhovsky Municipal District
  - Urban settlement: Chokurdakh Urban Settlement
  - Capital of: Allaikhovsky Municipal District, Chokurdakh Urban Settlement
- Time zone: UTC+11 (UTC+11:00)
- Postal codes: 678800, 678819
- OKTMO ID: 98606151051

Chokurdakh population
- 2010 Census: 2,367
- 2002 Census: 2,591
- 1989 Census: 3,845
- 1979 Census: 3,375

Chokurdakh (Russian: Чокурда́х; Yakut: Чокуурдаах, Çokuurdaax) is an urban locality (an urban-type settlement) and the administrative center of Allaikhovsky District of the Sakha Republic, Russia. As of the 2010 Census, its population was 2,367.

== Geography ==
Chokurdakh is located on the left bank of the Indigirka River, below its confluence with the Allaikha. The Yana-Indigirka Lowland lies to the west and northwest, and the Kondakov Plateau to the east, beyond the other bank of the Indigirka.

== History ==
It was founded in 1936 as the new administrative center of Allaikhovsky District, which was established in 1931. It served as a river port on the Indigirka, connecting to sea traffic using the Northern Sea Route. Urban-type settlement status was granted to it in 1981.

== Administrative and municipal status ==
Within the framework of administrative divisions, the urban-type settlement of Chokurdakh serves as the administrative center of Allaikhovsky District. As an administrative division, it is incorporated within Allaikhovsky District as the Settlement of Chokurdakh. As a municipal division, the Settlement of Chokurdakh is incorporated within Allaikhovsky Municipal District as Chokurdakh Urban Settlement.

== Economy and infrastructure ==
Chokurdakh is not connected with the outside world by any year-round roads. A winter road follows the Indigirka River upstream when it is frozen, traveling partly along the river ice, leading to Ust-Nera via Belaya Gora and Khonuu.

Chokurdakh is served by the Chokurdakh Airport, one of the most northerly airports in Russia, which may be unusable during strong winds and snowstorms.

== Climate ==
Chokurdakh has an extreme subarctic climate (Dfc), bordering on polar. Temperatures have never risen above freezing from October 20 through to April 11. The record high is 32.0 °C (89.6 °F) on 23 July 2020 and the record low is −54.4 °C (−65.9 °F) on 9 January 1964.

Climate data for Chokurdakh
Month	Jan	Feb	Mar	Apr	May	Jun	Jul	Aug	Sep	Oct	Nov	Dec	Year
Record high °C (°F)	−8.1 (17.4)	−9.0 (15.8)	−1.3 (29.7)	4.9 (40.8)	23.7 (74.7)	31.4 (88.5)	32.0 (89.6)	29.3 (84.7)	20.6 (69.1)	6.1 (43.0)	−0.9 (30.4)	−6.0 (21.2)	32.0 (89.6)
Mean daily maximum °C (°F)	−30.0 (−22.0)	−29.3 (−20.7)	−23.0 (−9.4)	−12.3 (9.9)	−1.2 (29.8)	11.7 (53.1)	15.8 (60.4)	12.5 (54.5)	4.4 (39.9)	−7.7 (18.1)	−20.1 (−4.2)	−27.7 (−17.9)	−8.9 (16.0)
Daily mean °C (°F)	−33.4 (−28.1)	−32.7 (−26.9)	−27.1 (−16.8)	−16.9 (1.6)	−4.9 (23.2)	6.7 (44.1)	10.6 (51.1)	8.1 (46.6)	1.6 (34.9)	−10.2 (13.6)	−23.3 (−9.9)	−31.0 (−23.8)	−12.7 (9.1)
Mean daily minimum °C (°F)	−36.6 (−33.9)	−35.9 (−32.6)	−30.7 (−23.3)	−21.4 (−6.5)	−8.3 (17.1)	2.7 (36.9)	6.5 (43.7)	4.6 (40.3)	−0.8 (30.6)	−13.0 (8.6)	−26.4 (−15.5)	−34.3 (−29.7)	−16.1 (3.0)
Record low °C (°F)	−54.4 (−65.9)	−50.3 (−58.5)	−48.2 (−54.8)	−42.6 (−44.7)	−30.0 (−22.0)	−11.2 (11.8)	−1.3 (29.7)	−4.8 (23.4)	−18.2 (−0.8)	−35.1 (−31.2)	−46.9 (−52.4)	−49.8 (−57.6)	−54.4 (−65.9)
Average precipitation mm (inches)	10.9 (0.43)	10.4 (0.41)	10.7 (0.42)	8.3 (0.33)	10.8 (0.43)	16.2 (0.64)	23.6 (0.93)	24.7 (0.97)	22.8 (0.90)	23.7 (0.93)	20.2 (0.80)	14.3 (0.56)	196.6 (7.75)
Average rainy days	0	0	0	0.1	3	14	17	17	14	0.3	0.1	0	66
Average snowy days	18	19	16	15	16	8	1	3	16	24	20	19	175
Average relative humidity (%)	79	79	79	79	81	75	75	82	87	88	84	80	81
Mean monthly sunshine hours	1	39	193	283	263	293	266	161	84	47	6	0	1,636
Source 1: Pogoda.ru.net
Source 2: NOAA (sun 1961–1990)
