= Kyun-Tas =

Mountain range in Russia

- Кюн-Тас / Күн Таас
- Location within Sakha Republic

Highest point
- Peak: Unnamed
- Elevation: 1,083 m (3,553 ft)

Dimensions
- Length: 100 km (62 mi) NW / SE
- Width: 50 km (31 mi) NE / SW

Geography
- Country: Russia
- Federal subject: Sakha Republic
- Division: Ust-Yansky District
- Range coordinates: 69°48′N 140°2′E
- Parent range: Momsko-Chersk Region, East Siberian System
- Borders on: Selennyakh Range; Polousny Range

Geology
- Rock age: Cretaceous
- Rock type(s): Sandstone, mudstone

Kyun-Tas (Russian: Кюн-Тас; Yakut: Күн Таас, romanized: Kün Taas) is a mountain range in the Sakha Republic, Far Eastern Federal District, Russia.

The Kyun-Tas is one of the mountain areas of Yakutia where there are kigilyakh rock formations.

== Geography ==
The Kyun-Tas is located 55 kilometres (34 mi) northeast of Deputatsky, between the Selennyakh Range and the western end of the Polousny Range. It rises at the southern limit of the Yana-Indigirka Lowland, northwest of the Aby Lowland. It is a broad massif with mountains of middle height and smooth slopes.

The main ridge stretches in a roughly southeast/northwest direction west of the eastern slopes of the Selennyakh Range for about 100 km (62 mi). Although the range is smaller, the highest summits of the Kyun-Tas are higher than those of the neighboring Polousny Range. The highest peak, located in the northern part, is 1,083 metres (3,553 ft) high; there is another high peak at the southeastern end that is 1,031 metres (3,383 ft).

=== Hydrography ===
The 243 kilometres (151 mi) long Nuchcha, a tributary of the Chondon, originates in the range. Also the 170 kilometres (110 mi) long Baky, one of the rivers that forms the Uyandina tributary of the Indigirka, has its source in Lake Baky, located at the junction of the Kyun-Tas and the western end of the Polousny Range.

== See also ==
- Kigilyakh
