= Gusinaya =

Gusinaya may refer to:

- Gusinaya Zemlya, a peninsula in Arkhangelsk Oblast
- Gusinaya Bay, a bay in Yakutia
- Gusinaya (river), a river flowing into Gusinaya Bay
- Gusinaya Lyaga, a settlement in Altai Krai
