= Sellyakh Bay =

Bay in Ust-Yansky District, Sakha Republic (Yakutia), Russian Federation

- Селляхская губа / Сиэллээх тамах
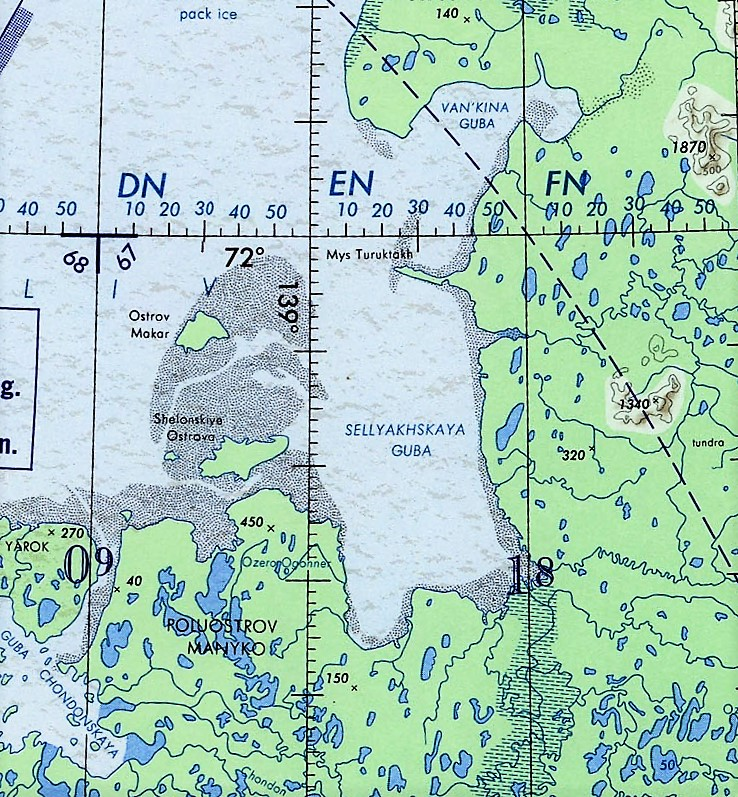
- Sellyakh Bay ONC map section

- Location of the bay in Yakutia
- Location: Far North
- Coordinates: 71°39′N 139°24′E
- River sources: Sellyakh and Muksunuokha
- Ocean/sea sources: Laptev Sea
- Basin countries: Russia
- Max. length: 55 km (34 mi)
- Max. width: 25 km (16 mi)
- Average depth: 10 m (33 ft)
- Settlements: None

Sellyakh Bay (Russian: Селляхская губа; Yakut: Сиэллээх тамах) is a bay in Ust-Yansky District, Sakha Republic (Yakutia), Russian Federation.

There are no settlements in the bay area, the nearest inhabited place is Tumat to the south. Formerly there was a temporary Polar station in Makar Island.

== Geography ==
The bay opens to the north in the eastern shores of the Yana Bay, Laptev Sea. It is located northeast of the mouths of the Chondon and southeast of the Makar and Shelonsky Islands. The Manyko Peninsula encloses the bay to the northwest and to the north the bay is limited by a narrow spit with Cape Turuktakh at the end.

=== Hydrography ===
The 352 km (219 mi) long Sellyakh and the 267 km (166 mi) long Muksunuokha (Максунуоха) are the main rivers with their mouths in the bay. Other rivers flowing into it are the 125 km (78 mi) long Bilir (Билир), the 113 km (70 mi) long Danilkina (Данилкина) and the 44 km (27 mi) long Kyulyumelyakh (Кюлюмэлээх). The shores of the bay are fringed by shoals. They are low and in parts boggy, part of a flat region dotted with lakes.

== See also ==
- Yana-Indigirka Lowland
