= Druzhina (disambiguation) =

Druzhina may refer to:

- Druzhina, in the history of early East Slavs was a detachment of select troops in personal service of a chieftain, later knyaz
- Druzhina, Sakha Republic, a village in the Sakha Republic, Russia, a port on the Indigirka
- Druzhina (river), a river in the Sakha Republic, Russia, tributary of the Indigirka
- Voluntary People's Druzhina, a public organization in the Soviet Union aimed at maintenance of public order and struggle with hooliganism, similar to Neighborhood Watch
- Druzhina, a unit of the "Young Pioneers" (Vladimir Lenin All-Union Pioneer Organization)
