= Makar Island =

Island in the Sakha Republic (Yakutia), Russian Federation

Coordinates: 71°51′58″N 138°30′00″E

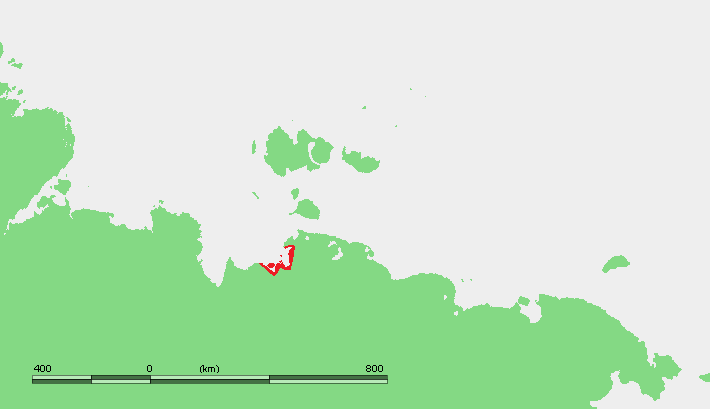
Location of Makar Island in the Laptev Sea.

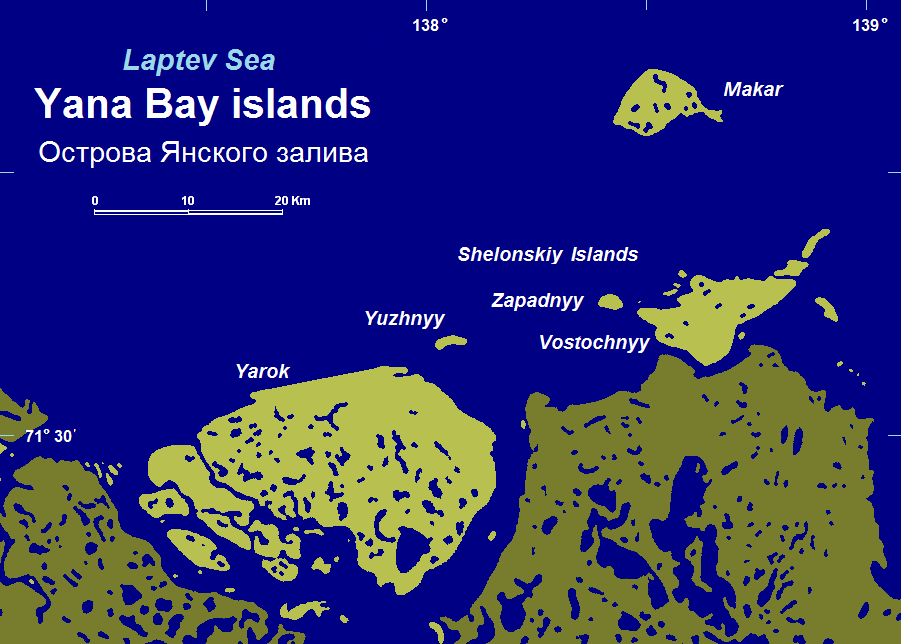
Makar Island and nearby coastal islands.

Makar Island (Остров Макар) is an island in the Sakha Republic (Yakutia), Russian Federation. It is part of the Yana Bay of the Laptev Sea.

There is a Russian Polar station on the island. In 1985 bison bones from the Pleistocene were collected by Yu. A. Yarlykov on Makar Island.

== Geography ==
Makar Island is located off the NW end of Sellyakh Bay, about 30 km (19 mi) from the mouths of the Chondon to the south, and 21 km (13 mi) north of the Shelonsky Islands. The island is flat and marshy. It has some small lakes and a landspit pointing towards the east. Its length is 11 km (6.8 mi) and its maximum breadth 6 km (3.7 mi). This island, like Muostakh Island further west in the Buor-Khaya Gulf, is subject to heavy erosion.

The Yana Bay area is subject to severe Arctic weather with frequent gales and blizzards. The sea in the bay is frozen with thick ice for about eight months every year.

== See also ==
- List of islands of Russia
- List of research stations in the Arctic
