= Shelonsky Islands =

Island group in the Sakha Republic (Yakutia), Russian Federation

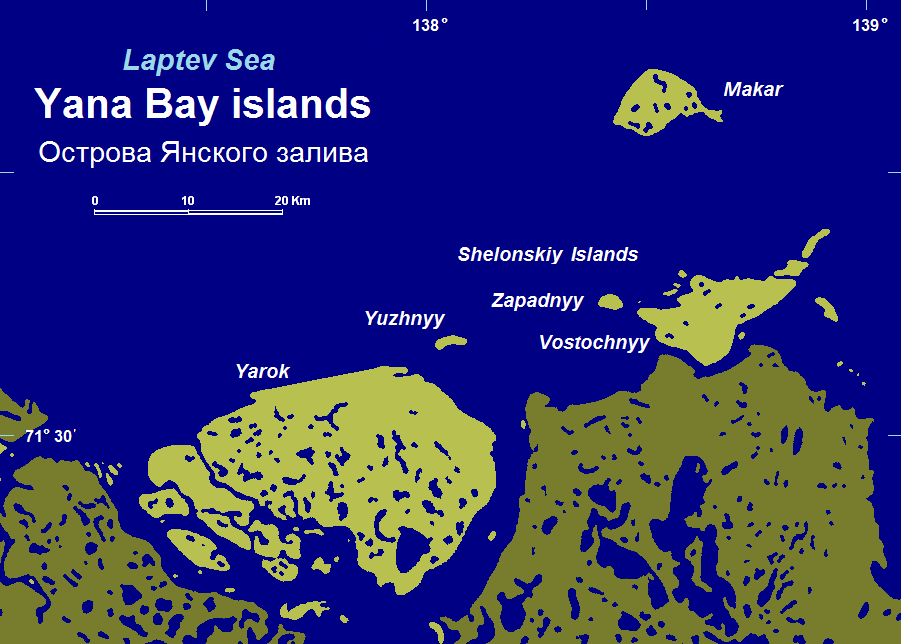
- The Shelonsky group and adjacent islands

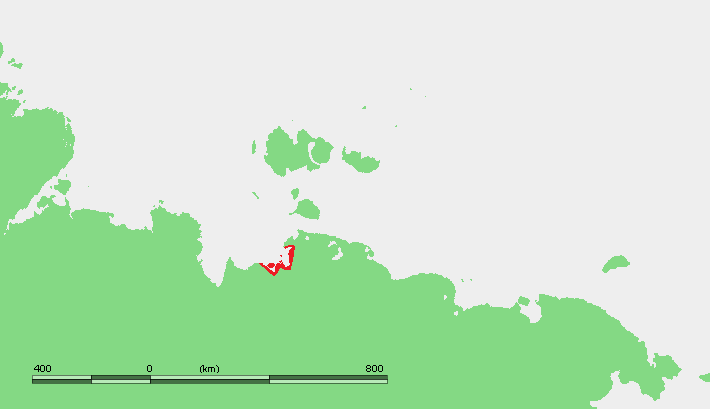

Geography
- Location: Laptev Sea
- Coordinates: 71.675°N 138.440°E
- Archipelago: Shelonsky Islands
- Total islands: 12

Administration
- Russia
- Republic: Sakha

The Shelonsky Islands (Russian: Шелонские острова, Shelonskiye Ostrova) is an island group in the Sakha Republic (Yakutia), Russian Federation.

They are located in the Laptev Sea and are subject to severe Arctic weather with frequent gales and blizzards. There are no settlements on the islands.

== Geography ==
The Shelonsky Islands are part of the coastal lowlands of the Yana Bay, east of the mouths of the Chondon river and west of Sellyakh Bay. They are marshy and flat. The coastal area off which these islands lie, is an extensive wetland zone.

Further north, the sea in the Yana Bay is frozen with thick ice for about eight months yearly, so that these coastal islands are merged with the mainland most of the year.

=== Islands ===
- The largest is Vostochnyy Shelonsky, it is located on the northern shores of the Manyko Peninsula (Poluostrov Manyko). This island has a length of 17 km and a maximum width of 7.2 km. Vostochnyy has many small lakes and becomes narrower towards its eastern end. East of this island lies a deep inlet stretching southwards known in Russian as Sellyakhskaya Guba.
- Zapadnyy Shelonsky Island is much smaller, being only 2.5 km across. It lies off Vostochnyy's western tip, separated from it by a 2 km wide sound.
- Yuzhnyy Shelonsky lies detached from the main group, 20 km further to the west, off the NE shores of Yarok Island. It is 3 km long and 0.7 km wide.
- There are a few other small unnamed islands in the group, all of them close to Vostochnyy.
