= Uyandina =

River in Yakutia, Russia

Uyandina Уяндина / Уйаандьы
- Mouth location in Yakutia, Russia

Location
- Country: Russia

Physical characteristics
- Source
  - location: Confluence of Irgichyan and Baky
  - elevation: 169 metres (554 ft)
- Mouth: Indigirka
  - coordinates: 68.4042°N 145.8322°E
  - elevation: 23 metres (75 ft)
- Length: 586 km (364 mi)
- Basin size: 177,000 km^{2} (68,000 sq mi)

Basin features
- Progression: Indigirka→ East Siberian Sea

The Uyandina (Russian: Уяндина; Yakut: Уйаандьы, romanized: Uyaancı) is a river in Yakutia, Russia, a tributary of the Indigirka. The length of the Uyandina is 586 kilometres (364 mi). The area of its drainage basin is 177,000 square kilometres (68,000 mi^{2}).

== Course ==
The river is formed by the confluence of the 211 kilometres (131 mi) long Irgichyan originating in the NW Selennyakh Range and the 170 kilometres (110 mi) long Baky, which has its source in Lake Baky, located at the junction of the western end of the Polousny Range and the Kyun-Tas. After flowing in a roughly southern direction in its upper course, the Uyandina flows then eastwards through the Aby Lowland. Finally it meets the left bank of the Indigirka 599 kilometres (372 mi) from its mouth.

The Uyandina freezes up in October and remains icebound until late May or early June.

=== Tributaries ===
The biggest tributaries of the Uyandina are the 444 km (276 mi) long Khatyngnakh and 290 km (180 mi) long Khachimcher from the left, as well as the 213 km (132 mi) long Buor-Yuryakh from the right.

== See also ==
- List of rivers of Russia
