= Yarok Island =

Coastal island in the Laptev Sea

Yarok
Native name: остров Ярок
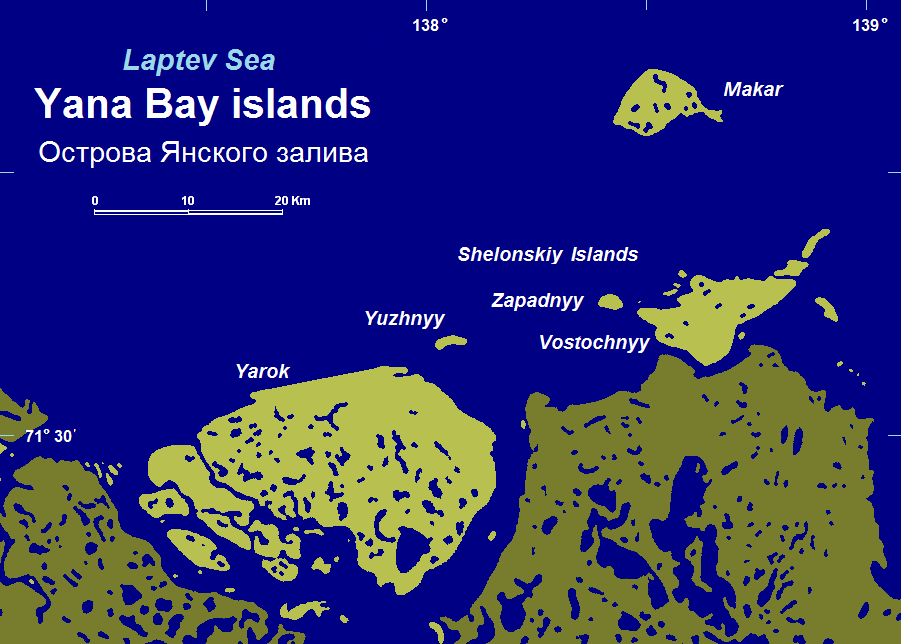
- Yarok and adjacent islands

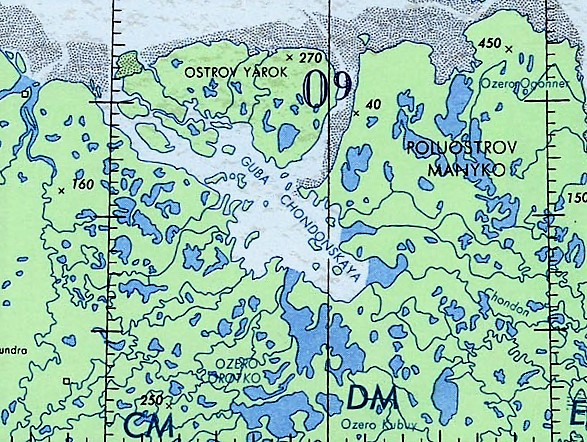
- Mouths of the Chondon ONC map section

Geography
- Location: Laptev Sea
- Coordinates: 71°32′N 137°40′E
- Length: 38 km (23.6 mi)
- Width: 26 km (16.2 mi)

Administration
- Russia
- Republic: Sakha

Demographics
- Population: uninhabited

Yarok Island (Russian: остров Ярок) is a coastal island in the Laptev Sea, a marginal sea of the Arctic Ocean. The island is located off the mouths of the Chondon, east of the Yana river.

Administratively, Yarok Island is part of Ust-Yansky District, Sakha Republic (Yakutia), Russia.

== Geography ==
Yarok Island is large and flat. It has many small lakes, swamps and sandbars. Its length is 38 kilometers (24 mi) and its maximum breadth is 26 kilometers (16 mi).

The Chondon bay, the coastal area off which Yarok Island lies, is an extensive wetland zone. It is subject to severe Arctic weather with frequent gales and blizzards. Further north, the sea in the Yana Bay is frozen with thick ice for about eight months every year, so that Yarok is merged with the mainland.

== History ==
In 1712, Yakov Permyakov and his companion Merkury Vagin, the first recorded Russian explorers of the area, crossed the Yana Bay from the mouth of the Yana River to Bolshoy Lyakhovsky Island over the ice and explored the then unknown island. Unfortunately Permyakov and Vagin were killed on the way back from their exploration by mutineering expedition members.

In 1892–1894, Baron Eduard Toll, accompanied by expedition leader Alexander Bunge, carried out geological surveys in the Yana delta area on behalf of the Russian Imperial Academy of Sciences located in St. Petersburg.
