= Yana Bay =

Body of water in the Sakha Republic (Yakutia), Russian Federation

- Янский залив (Russian)
- Map showing the location of Yana Bay

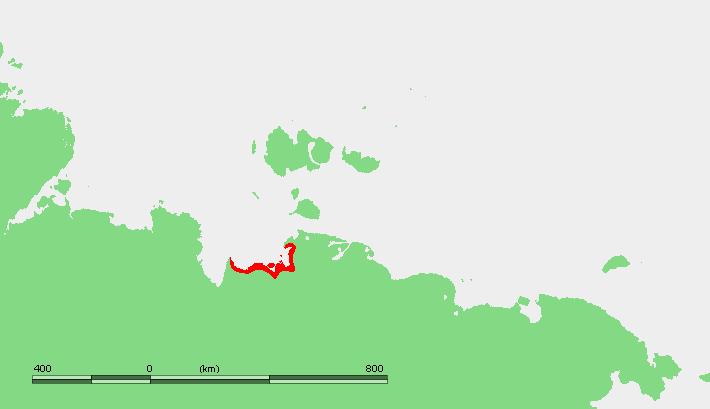
- Location: Far North
- Coordinates: 72°0′N 136°30′E
- River sources: Yana, Chondon
- Ocean/sea sources: Laptev Sea
- Basin countries: Russia

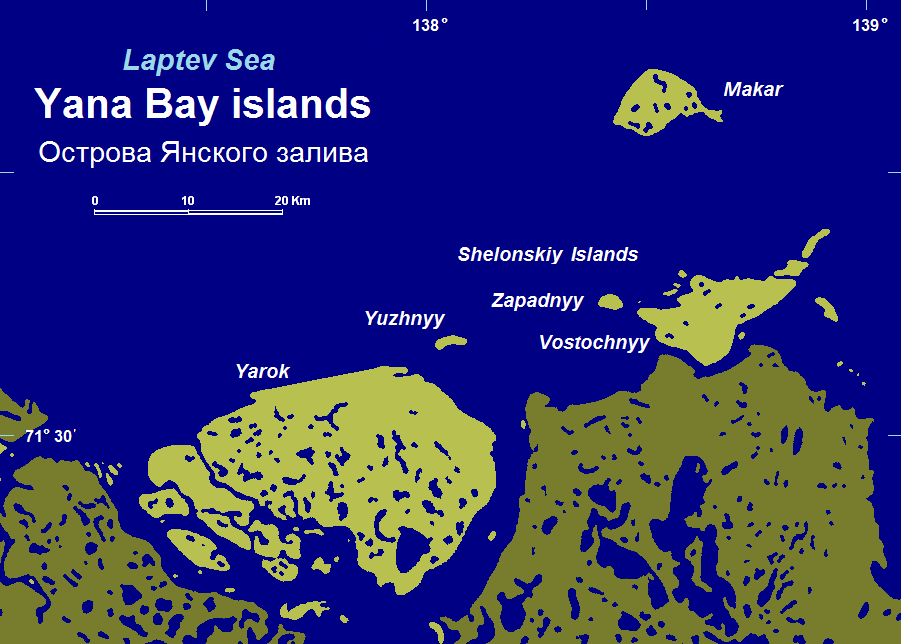
Islands at the eastern end of the Yana Bay.

The Yana Bay (Russian: Янский залив; Yanskiy Zaliv) is a body of water in the Sakha Republic (Yakutia), Russian Federation. It is the most important gulf of the Laptev Sea.

== Geography ==
The bay is located between Cape Buor-Khaya in the west and Ebelyakh Bay in the east. The Yana River flows into the Yana Bay, forming a huge river delta (10,200 km^{2}) that takes up much of the bay's coastline. The sea in this wide gulf is frozen for about nine months every year and is often clogged with ice floes.

Yarok is a large flat island located off the mouths of the Chondon. Other islands in the Yana Bay are Makar and the Shelonsky Islands. East of these islands lies Sellyakh Bay, a deep inlet stretching southwards where the 352 km (219 mi) long Sellyakh and the 267 km (166 mi) long Muksunuokha have their mouths.

== History ==
In 1712 Yakov Permyakov and his companion Merkury Vagin, the first recorded Russian explorers of the area, crossed the Yana Bay on dogsled from the mouth of the Yana River to Bolshoy Lyakhovsky over the ice in order to explore the then unknown island. Unfortunately Permyakov and Vagin were killed on the way back from their exploration by mutineering expedition members.

In 1892–1894 Baron Eduard von Toll, accompanied by expedition leader Alexander von Bunge, carried out geological surveys in the area on behalf of the Russian Imperial Academy of Sciences.
