= Orotko =

Lake in Russia

- Оротко
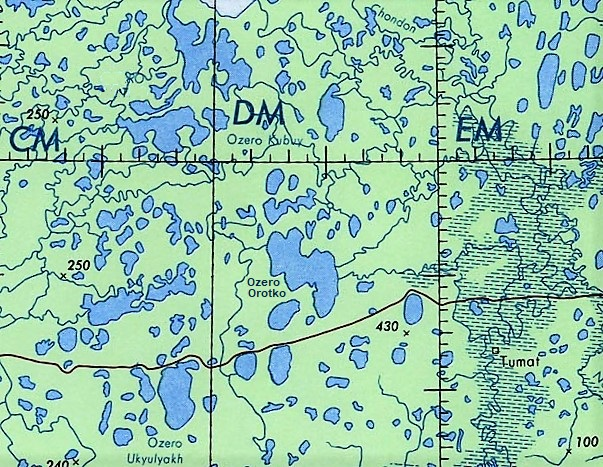
- Orotko lake area ONC map section

- Location in the Sakha Republic, Russian Far East
- Location: Yana-Indigirka Lowland
- Coordinates: 70°51′N 138°22′E
- Primary outflows: Togusta and Chubuku
- Catchment area: 791 square kilometres (305 mi^{2})
- Basin countries: Russia
- Max. length: 21 km (13 mi)
- Max. width: 12 km (7.5 mi)
- Surface area: 89.5 square kilometres (34.6 mi^{2})
- Frozen: September to June
- Settlements: None

Orotko (Russian: Оротко; Yakut: Оротко) is a freshwater lake in the Sakha Republic (Yakutia), Russia.

Orotko is one of the largest lakes in the Ust-Yansky District. The nearest inhabited place is Tumat, located about 30 km (19 mi) to the southeast. Like most bodies of water in the region it has not been studied enough. There are numerous smaller lakes in its vicinity.

== Geography ==
Orotko lake lies north of the Arctic Circle, in the western part of the Yana-Indigirka Lowland. It is located in an area of lakes between the lower course of the Yana and the Chondon. The main outflowing rivers exit the lake from the eastern shore of the lake. To the north the Chubuku flows northeastwards and to the south the Togusta heads eastwards. Both are left tributaries of the Chondon. The lake begins to freeze in mid September and stays under ice until early June.

== Fauna ==
Lake Orotko is rich in fish.

== See also ==
- List of lakes of Russia
