= Khatyngnakh (river) =

River in Yakutia, Russia

Khatyngnakh Хатынгнах / Хатыҥнаах
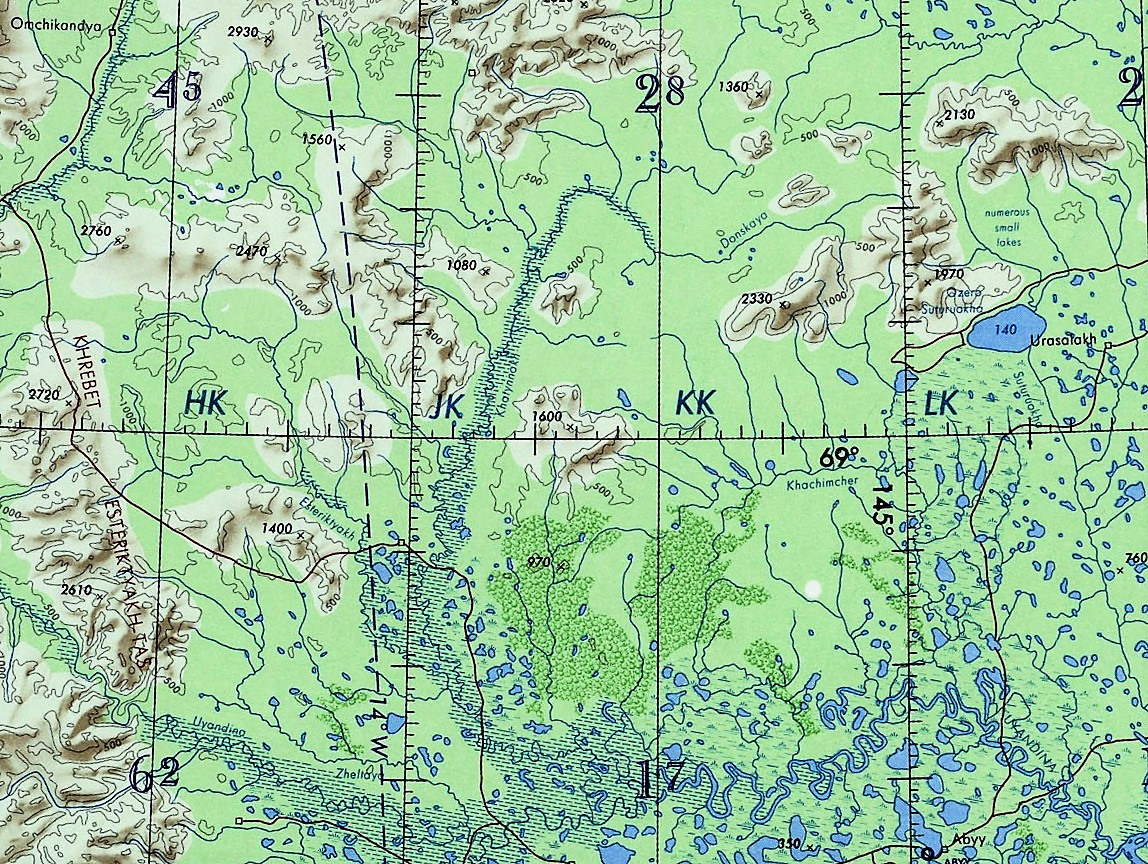
- Khatyngnakh course ONC map section

- Mouth location in Yakutia, Russia

Location
- Country: Russia

Physical characteristics
- Source
  - location: Polousny Range
  - coordinates: 69°16′38″N 143°30′07″E
- Mouth: Uyandina
  - coordinates: 68°32′08″N 144°31′48″E
  - elevation: 37 metres (121 ft)
- Length: 444 km (276 mi) (600 kilometres (370 mi))
- Basin size: 10,100 km^{2} (3,900 sq mi)

Basin features
- Progression: Uyandina → Indigirka → Laptev Sea

The Khatyngnakh (Russian: Хатынгнах; Yakut: Хатыҥнаах, Xatıŋnaax), or Khatynnakh (Хатыннах), is a river in the Sakha Republic (Yakutia), Russia. It is the longest tributary of the Uyandina. The river has a length of 444 kilometres (276 mi) —600 kilometres (370 mi) together with the Donskaya— and a drainage basin area of 10,100 square kilometres (3,900 mi^{2}).

The Khatyngnakh is fed by snow and rain. It flows north of the Arctic Circle, across desolate territories of the Aby District.

== Course ==
The Khatyngnakh is a left tributary of the Uyandina. It is formed by the confluence of the 156 km (97 mi) long Donskaya from the left and the 115 km (71 mi) long 2nd Nonchondzhya (2-я Нонгонджя) from the right, both rivers having their sources in the southern slopes of the Polousny Range.

The Khatyngnakh flows meandering roughly southwards across a vast floodplain in the northern sector of the Aby Lowland, where there are innumerable lakes and swamps. Finally the river joins the left bank of the Uyandina 170 km (110 mi) from its mouth in the Indigirka.

=== Tributaries ===
The main tributaries of the Khatyngnakh are the 219 km (136 mi) long Esterikteekh (Эстэриктээх), the 41 km (25 mi) long Ryumkalaakh (Рюмкалаах) and the 33 km (21 mi) long Bysagyrdaakh (Бысагырдаах) on the right, as well as the 101 km (63 mi) long Mekchirge (Мэкчиргэ) and the 65 km (40 mi) long Kirdik (Кирдик) on the left. The river is frozen between the beginning of October and the beginning of June. There are more than 1,500 lakes in its basin with a total area of 185 km^{2} (71 sq mi).

== See also ==
- List of rivers of Russia
