= Lake Mogotoyevo =

- Моготоево озеро / Моҕотой Күөлэ
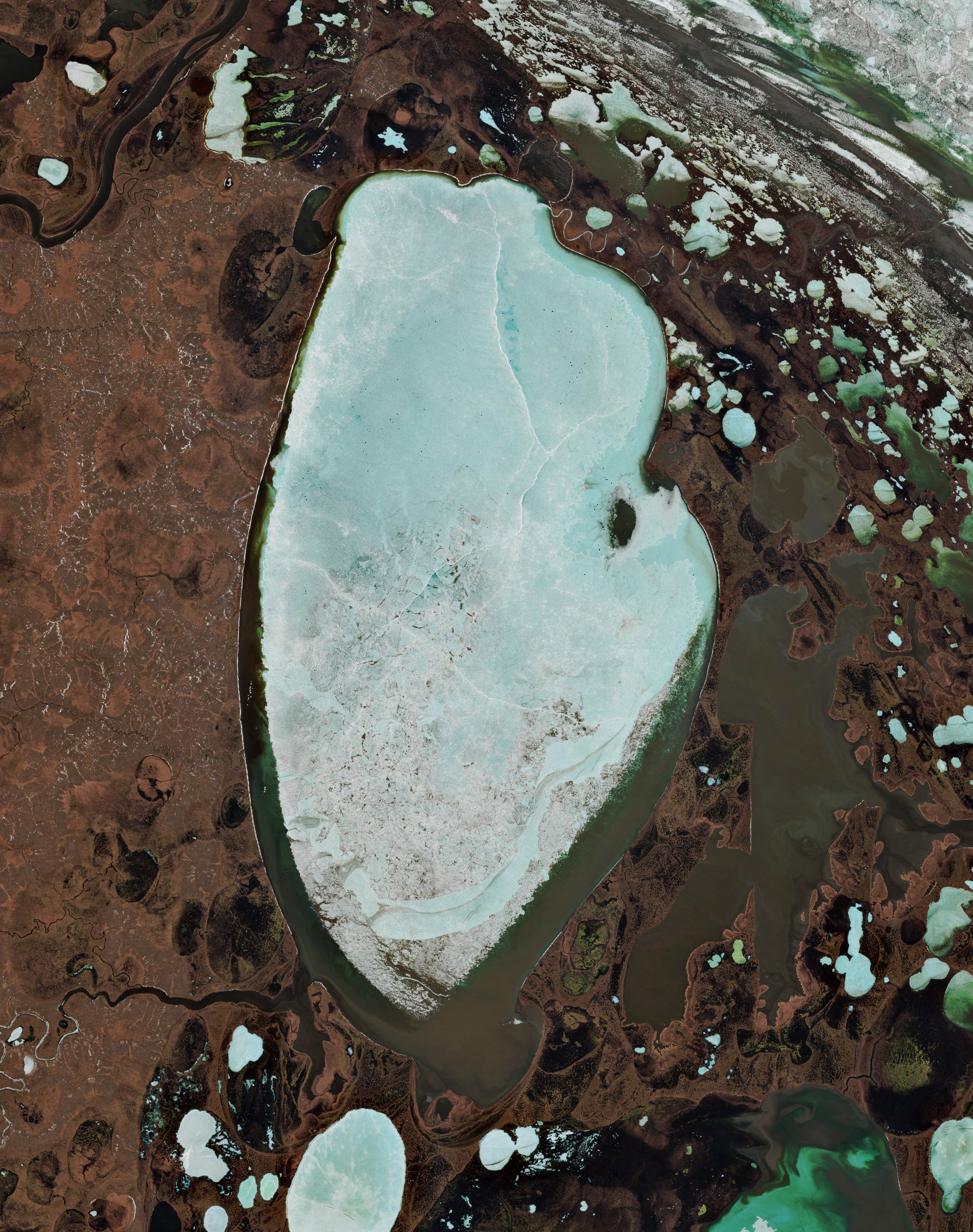
- Sentinel-2 image (2022)

- Location in the Sakha Republic, Russia
- Location: Sakha Republic, Russia
- Coordinates: 72°01′24″N 149°08′36″E
- Lake type: Coastal lagoon
- Catchment area: 1,170 km^{2} (450 sq mi)
- Basin countries: Russia
- Max. length: 34 km (21 mi)
- Max. width: 15 km (9.3 mi)
- Surface area: 323 km^{2} (125 sq mi)
- Surface elevation: 1 m (3 ft 3 in)
- Frozen: late September–June

Lake Mogotoyevo (Russian: Моготоево озеро; Yakut: Моҕотой Күөлэ, romanized: Moğotoy Küöle) is a coastal lake in Allaikhovsky District, Sakha Republic, Russia.

== Geography ==
With an area of 323 km^{2} (125 sq mi), it is the largest coastal lagoon in the Yana-Indigirka Lowland the lake freezes in the second half of September and melts in June. The Bogdashkina river mouth lies to the west of the lake and Gusinaya Bay to the southeast.

== Fauna ==
In the lake, large numbers of omul, Siberian ryapushka and nelma can be found. It is a breeding place for the Siberian crane (Grus leucogeranus).
