= Saltag-Tas =

Mountain in Sakha Republic, Russia

- Салтага-Тас
- Location within Sakha Republic

Highest point
- Elevation: 2,021 m (6,631 ft)
- Prominence: 1,622 m (5,322 ft)
- Coordinates: 68°21′27″N 140°4′37″E

Geography
- Location: Sakha Republic, Russia
- Parent range: Selennyakh Range

Geology
- Mountain type: Ultra

Climbing
- Easiest route: From Deputatsky

Saltag-Tas (Russian: Салтага-Тас) is a mountain in the Ust-Yansky District, Sakha Republic (Yakutia), Russia. At 2,021 m (6,631 ft) it is the highest mountain in the Selennyakh Range, part of the wider Chersky Range (Momsko-Chersk Region), East Siberian System.

== See also ==
- Geography of Russia
- List of mountains in Russia
- List of ultras of Northeast Asia
