= Kyuyol-Yuryakh =

River in Yakutia, Russia

Kyuyol-Yuryakh Кюёль-Юрях / Күөл-үрэх
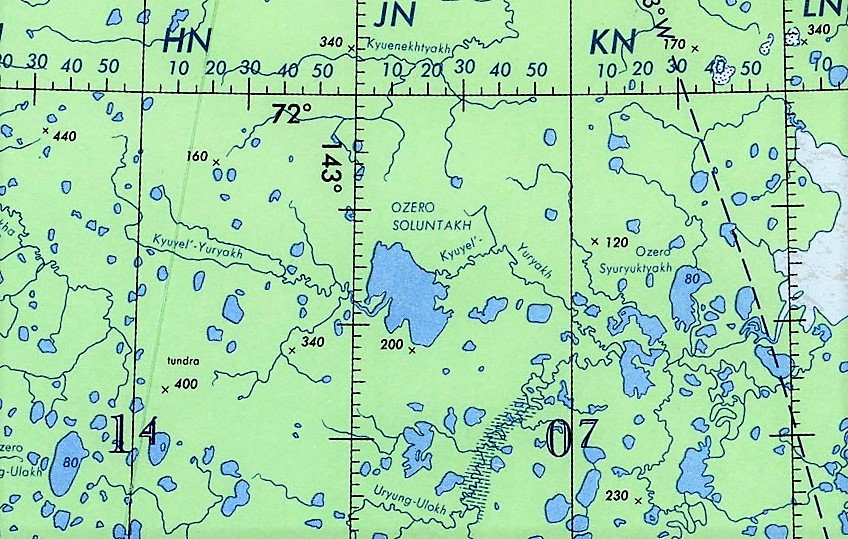
- Course of the Kyuyol-Yuryakh with lake Soluntakh at the center of the basin

- Mouth location in Yakutia, Russia

Location
- Country: Russia

Physical characteristics
- Source
  - coordinates: 71°55′50″N 141°51′07″E
- Mouth: Usun-Ulakh-Tubata
  - coordinates: 71°37′15″N 144°13′48″E
  - elevation: 4 metres (13 ft)
- Length: 247 km (153 mi)
- Basin size: 2,330 km^{2} (900 sq mi)

The Kyuyol-Yuryakh (Russian: Кюёль-Юрях; Yakut: Күөл-үрэх, Küöl-ürex) is a river in the Sakha Republic (Yakutia), Russia. It has a length of 247 kilometres (153 mi) and a drainage basin area of 2,330 square kilometres (900 mi^{2}).

The river flows north of the Arctic Circle, across territories of the East Siberian Lowland in Allaikhovsky District. It flows across Soluntakh, the largest lake in the area. There are no settlements along its course. The name of the river comes from the Yakut "Kuöl/urekh" (Күөл-үрэх), meaning "lake/river".

== Course ==
The Kyuyol-Yuryakh has its sources in a small lake of the northern end of the Yana-Indigirka Lowland, to the east of the Muksunuokha basin. The river heads first roughly southwards across a tundra area marked by permafrost and numerous small lakes. After a stretch it bends and flows in an ESE direction until it meets the western shore of lake Soluntakh, forming the primary inflow of the relatively large lake. The Kyuyol-Yuryakh then flows out of the lake from the eastern shore, meandering strongly in an ENE direction for a stretch, after which it turns southeastward to the north of the course of the Uryung-Ulakh, the main tributary of the Khroma. Finally it ends in lake Usun-Ulakh-Tubata (Усун-Уулаах-Тубата), entering it from the northwest.

=== Tributaries ===
The main tributary of the Kyuyol-Yuryakh is the 77 km (48 mi) long Balyktakh-Yuryakh (Балыктаах-Юрэх) on the right. There are over 800 lakes in the basin, totaling an area of 129 km^{2} (50 sq mi). The river is frozen between early October and mid June.

== See also ==
- List of rivers of Russia
