= Sellyakh =

River in northeastern Russia

Sellyakh: Сыалах; Сиэллээх
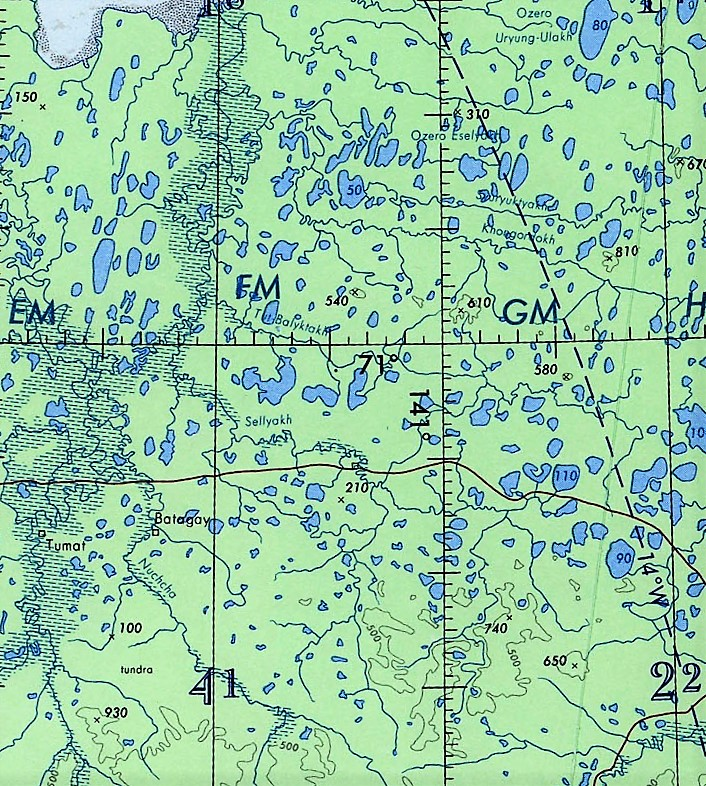
- Course of the Sellyakh ONC map section

- Mouth location in Yakutia, Russia

Location
- Country: Russia

Physical characteristics
- Source
  - coordinates: 70°48′01″N 140°41′48″E
  - elevation: 7 metres (23 ft)
- Mouth: Laptev Sea
  - location: Sellyakh Bay
  - coordinates: 71°28′53″N 140°01′42″E
  - elevation: 0 metres (0 ft)
- Length: 352 km (219 mi)
- Basin size: 8,700 km^{2} (3,400 sq mi)

The Sellyakh (Russian: Сыалах or Сельлях; Yakut: Сиэллээх, Sielleex) is a river in the Sakha Republic (Yakutia), Russia. It is 352 kilometres (219 mi) long —including the Ilin-Sellyakh (Russian: Илин-Сыалаах) at its head— and its drainage basin covers 8,700 square kilometres (3,400 mi^{2}).

The river flows north of the Arctic Circle, across territories of the Ust-Yansky District with areas of permafrost. The lower course of the river belongs to the Yana Delta Ramsar wetland site. There are no settlements along its course. The nearest town is Tumat.

== Course ==
The Sellyakh has its sources in the western part of the Yana-Indigirka Lowland, East Siberian Lowland. The river is formed at the confluence of 125 km (78 mi) long Ilin-Sellyakh and 90 km (56 mi) long Arga-Sellyakh, also known as Sygynakhtaakh (Сыгынахтаах). The Sellyakh flows roughly northwestwards across very swampy flatland dotted with small lakes, to the northeast of the Nuchcha. Its channel meanders strongly and in its lower course the river turns north, its floodplain roughly parallel to the Chondon that flows northwards to the west. Finally the river ends in the Sellyakh Bay of the Laptev Sea. It shares a common mouth system with the Bilir, to the southwest of the mouth of the Danilkina.

=== Tributaries ===
The main tributaries of the Sellyakh are the 189 km (117 mi) long Tut-Balyktakh (Туут-Балыктаах) and the 235 km (146 mi) long Syuyuryukteekh (Сююрюктээх) on the right, as well as the 90 km (56 mi) long Sygynastakh (Сыгынастаах) on the left. There are over 6,000 lakes in the Sellyakh basin. The river is frozen between early October and early June.

== See also ==
- List of rivers of Russia
