= Nuchcha =

River in Yakutia, Russia

Nuchcha Нучча / Нуучча
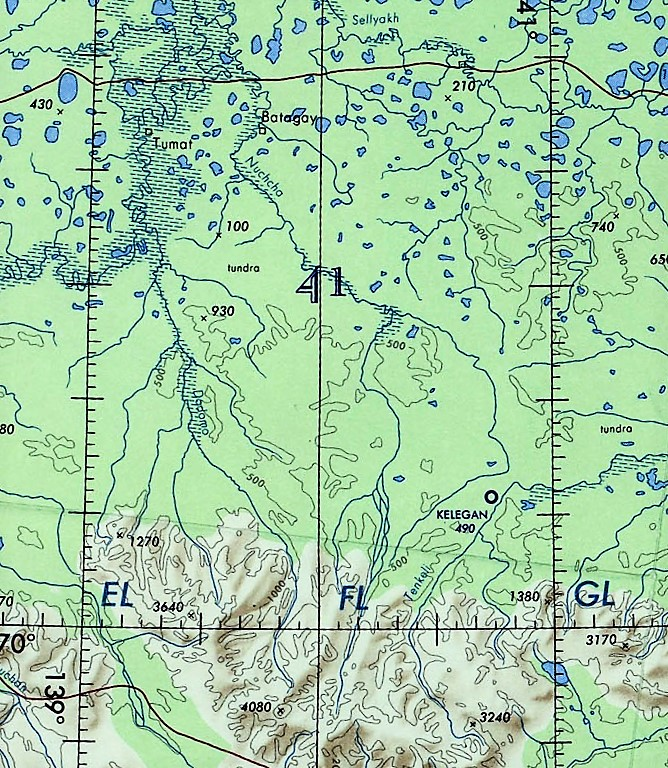
- Nuchcha course ONC map section

- Mouth location in Yakutia, Russia

Location
- Country: Russia

Physical characteristics
- Source
  - location: Kyun-Tas
  - coordinates: 69°52′52″N 140°04′54″E
  - elevation: ca 900 metres (3,000 ft)
- Mouth: Chondon
  - coordinates: 70°53′31″N 139°28′44″E
  - elevation: 18 metres (59 ft)
- Length: 243 km (151 mi)
- Basin size: 2,410 km^{2} (930 sq mi)

Basin features
- Progression: Chondon → Laptev Sea

The Nuchcha or Nuuchcha (Russian: Нучча; Yakut: Нуучча, romanized: Nuuçça) is a river in the Sakha Republic (Yakutia), Russia. It is the longest tributary of the Chondon. The river has a length of 243 kilometres (151 mi) and a drainage basin area of 2,410 square kilometres (930 mi^{2}).

The Nuchcha flows north of the Arctic Circle, across desolate territories of the Ust-Yansky District. An abandoned village named "Batagay" was located by the riverside in its lower course. A 2021 Yakut fictional film which received an award at the Karlovy Vary International Film Festival was named Nuuchcha.

== Course ==
The Nuchcha is a right tributary of the Chondon. It has its sources in the northern slopes of the Kyun-Tas range. The river flows roughly northwards within a valley. After it leaves the mountainous terrain it heads across the Yana-Indigirka Lowland floodplain to the southwest of the Sellyakh. It flows slowly through flat terrain where it meanders very strongly among numerous lakes. Finally the river joins the Chondon 126 km (78 mi) from its mouth. Tumat, the nearest inhabited place, is located nearly 20 km (12 mi) upstream of the confluence.

=== Tributaries ===
The main tributaries of the Nuchcha are the 45 km (28 mi) long Bylaat-Yurege (Былаат-Юрэгэ) and the 38 km (24 mi) long Buruuchaan-Yurege (Буруучаан-Юрюйэ) on the right, as well as the 26 km (16 mi) long Ekechan (Экэчан) on the left. The river is frozen between the beginning of October and the beginning of June. There are more than 1,300 lakes in its basin.

== See also ==
- List of rivers of Russia
