= Gusinaya Bay =

Bay in the Sakha Republic (Yakutia), Russian Federation

- Гусиная губа / Хаастаах тамах
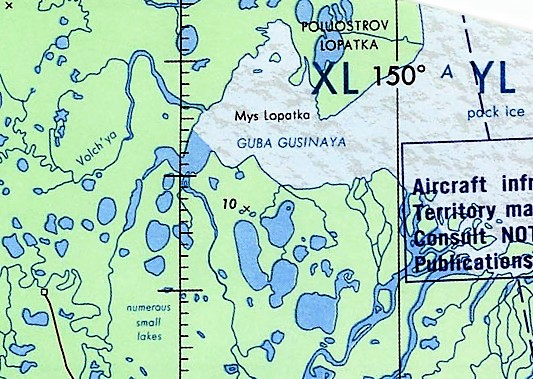
- Gusinaya Bay ONC map section

- Location of the bay in Yakutia
- Location: Far North
- Coordinates: 71°43′N 149°28′E
- River sources: Gusinaya and Volchya
- Ocean/sea sources: East Siberian Sea
- Basin countries: Russia

Gusinaya Bay (Russian: Гусиная губа; Yakut: Хаастаах тамах) is a bay in the Sakha Republic (Yakutia), Russian Federation.

== Geography ==
The bay opens to the east in the southern limits of the East Siberian Sea. It is located northwest of the mouths of the Indigirka and southeast of the mouth of the Bogdashkina. Gusinaya Bay is enclosed in the northeast by the Lopatka Peninsula. Lake Mogotoyevo lies a little inland to the north.

The 278 km (173 mi) long Gusinaya (Yakut: Хаастаах) and the 164 km (102 mi) long Volchya are the main rivers flowing into the head of the bay.

== See also ==
- Yana-Indigirka Lowland
