= Bustakh =

Lake in Ust-Yansky District, Sakha Republic, Russia

- Бустах / Буустаах
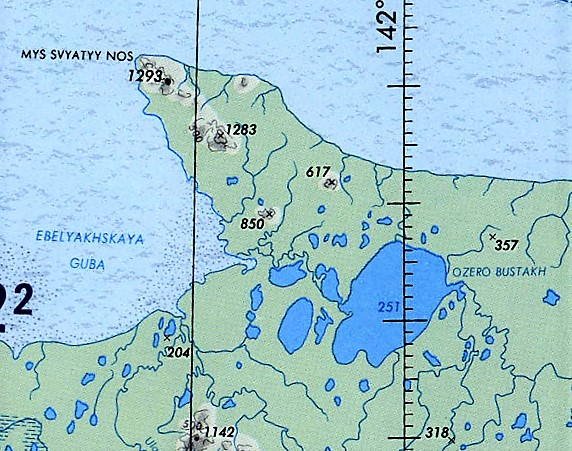
- Lake Bustakh ONC map section

- Location in Sakha, Russian Far East
- Location: Sakha
- Coordinates: 72°32′N 141°56′E
- Primary inflows: Arkhip-Yurege
- Catchment area: 1,640 km^{2} (630 sq mi)
- Basin countries: Russia
- Max. length: 23 km (14 mi)
- Max. width: 14 km (8.7 mi)
- Surface area: 249 km^{2} (96 sq mi)

Bustakh (Russian: Бустах; Yakut: Буустаах, Buustaax) is a large freshwater lake in Ust-Yansky District, Sakha Republic, Russia.

Bustakh freezes up in late September and stays icebound until June. It is rich in fish.

== Geography ==
With an area of 249 square kilometers (96 sq mi) it is one of the largest lakes of the Yana-Indigirka Lowland. The lake lies close to the Ebelyakh Bay of the Laptev Sea.

== See also ==
- List of lakes of Russia
