= Fyodor Matyushkin =

Russian admiral (1799–1872)

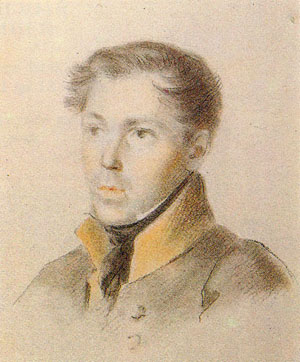
Fyodor Matyushkin

Fyodor Fyodorovich Matyushkin (Russian: Матюшкин, Федор Федорович; 21 July [O.S. 10 July] 1799 - 28 September [O.S. 16 September] 1872) was a Russian navigator, Admiral (1867), and a close friend of Aleksandr Pushkin, who studied with him at the Tsarskoye Selo Lyceum.

Matyushkin graduated from Tsarskoye Selo Lyceum in 1817. After having volunteered for the navy, he participated in Vassili Golovnin's world cruise on the ship Kamchatka in 1817–1819.

In 1820–1824, Matyushkin took part in Ferdinand Wrangel's Arctic expedition to the East Siberian Sea and the Chukchi Sea. They explored and mapped Chetyrekhstolbovoy Island, the southernmost of the Medvyezhi Islands, then an almost unknown island group. Following this survey Matyushkin explored on his own a vast tundra area east of the Kolyma river and collected valuable ethnographic data.

In 1825–1827, he joined Ferdinand von Wrangel in his world cruise on the ship Krotky. In 1828–1829, Matyushkin took part in the Russo-Turkish war, commanding different military vessels. In 1835, he served in the Black Sea Fleet, in 1850—1851 — in the Baltic Fleet. Starting from 1852, Matyushkin worked in the Department of the Navy as an admiral. In 1858, he was appointed Chairman of the Naval Scientific Committee. In 1861, Matyushkin became a senator.

In 1825, before Matyushkin's second round-the-world voyage, Pushkin addressed him in his poem "October 19th".
