= Ebelyakh Bay =

Bay in the Laptev Sea

- Эбеляхская губа (Russian)
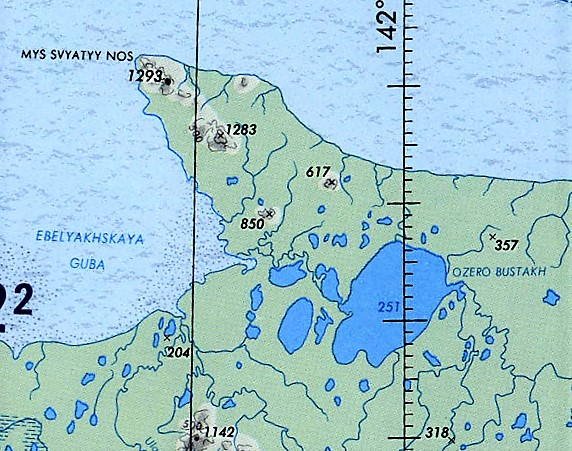
- Ebelyakh Bay ONC map section

- Map showing the location of Ebelyakh Bay

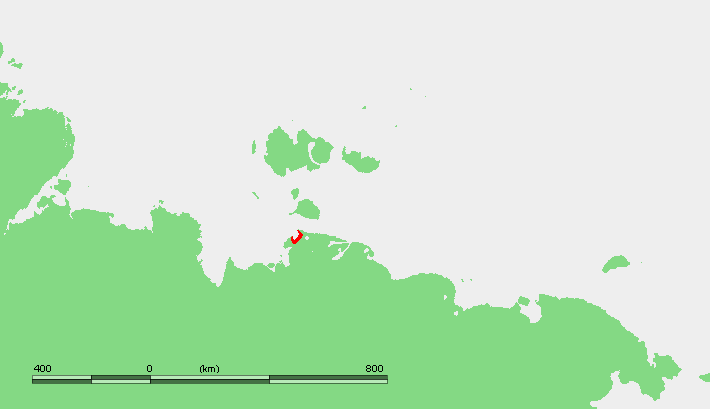
- Location: Far North
- Coordinates: 72.6667°N 140.4333°E
- River sources: Suruktakh, Uryung-Khastakh, Adargaydakh and Ekekey
- Ocean/sea sources: Laptev Sea
- Basin countries: Russia
- Max. width: 36 kilometres (22 mi)

The Ebelyakh Bay or Ebelyakhskaya Bay (Russian: Эбеляхская губа; Ebelyakhskaya Guba) is a bay in the Laptev Sea. It is located in Ust-Yansky District, Sakha Republic, Russian Federation.

== Geography ==
The bay lies east of the Yana Bay region and southwest of the Laptev Strait. It is 36 km in width and wide open to the northwest. It is limited in the north by Cape Svyatoy Nos, a prominent headland.

This bay is in a vast region of wetlands. Lake Bustakh, the largest lake in the neighboring area, lies 37 km inland from the shores of the bay. Owing to its northerly location the Ebelyakh Bay is covered with ice most of the year.
