= Cape Svyatoy Nos (Laptev Sea) =

Headland in the Laptev Sea

Cape Svyatoy Nos Святой Нос
- Cape
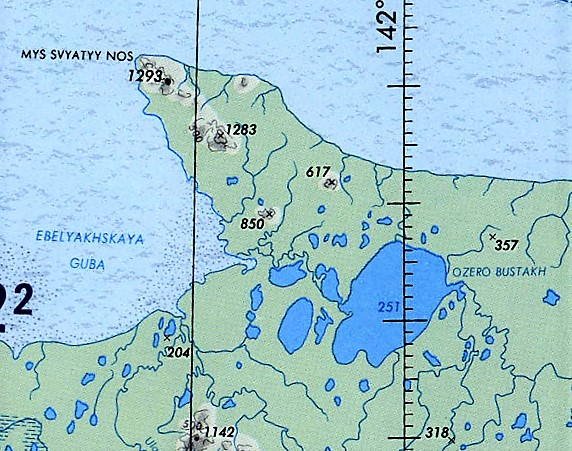
- Cape Svyatoy Nos ONC map section

- Location of the cape in the Sakha Republic
- Coordinates: 72°42′N 141°12′E
- Location: Sakha Republic Russia
- Offshore water bodies: Laptev Sea

Area
  - Total: Russian Far North

Cape Svyatoy Nos (Russian: Святой Нос) is a headland in the Laptev Sea. Administratively it is part of the Sakha Republic (Yakutia).

== Geography ==
This cape marks the northern end of Ebelyakh Bay. A prominent point, it is one of the landmarks defining the limits of the Laptev Sea according to the International Hydrographic Organization.
