= Soluntakh =

Lake in Russia

- Солунтах
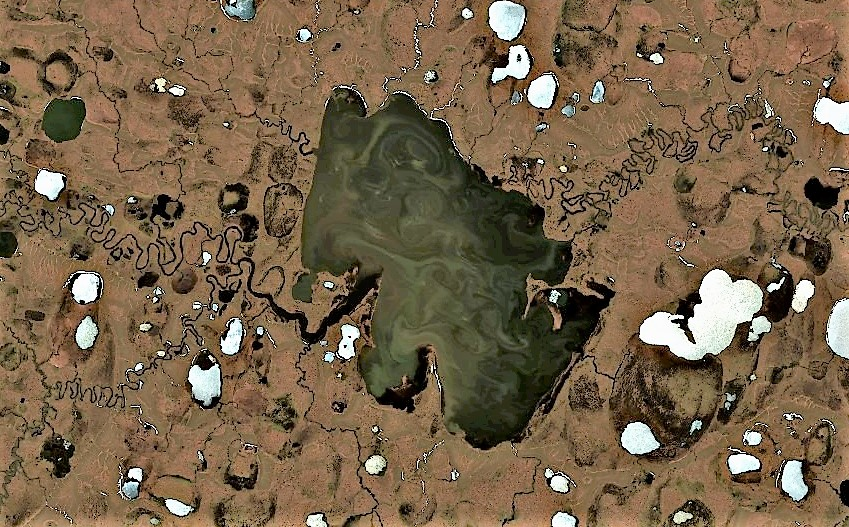
- Sentinel-2 image of the lake and its surrounding area

- Location in the Sakha Republic, Russian Far East
- Location: Yana-Indigirka Lowland
- Coordinates: 71°42′41″N 143°15′19″E
- Primary inflows: Kyuyol-Yuryakh
- Primary outflows: Kyuyol-Yuryakh
- Catchment area: 1,930 square kilometres (750 mi^{2})
- Basin countries: Russia
- Max. length: 19 km (12 mi)
- Max. width: 11 km (6.8 mi)
- Surface area: 131 square kilometres (51 mi^{2})
- Frozen: September to June
- Settlements: None

Soluntakh (Russian: Солунтах; Yakut: Солунтах, Soluntax) is a freshwater lake in the Sakha Republic (Yakutia), Russia. It is one of the largest lakes in the Allaikhovsky District. The region where Soluntakh lies is uninhabited.

Like most bodies of water in the area in has not been studied enough. A sector of the lake is a protected area.

== Geography ==
Soluntakh lake is located north of the Arctic Circle, in the central part of the Yana-Indigirka Lowland. It is crossed from west to east by the 247 km (153 mi) long Kyuyol-Yuryakh river, which enters its western shore roughly in the middle. All other inflowing rivers are small. There are many smaller lakes in the vicinity. The lake begins to freeze in mid September and stays under ice until early June.

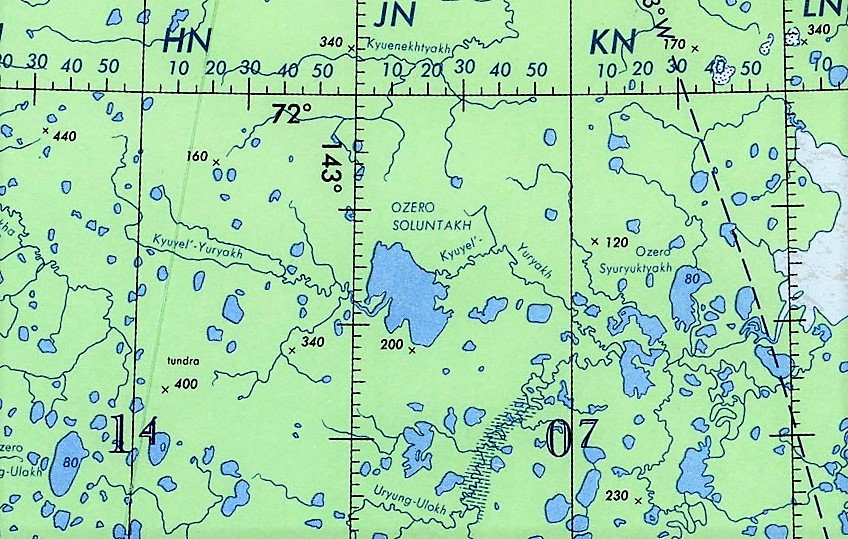
Course of the Kyuyol-Yuryakh with lake Soluntakh at the center of the basin ONC map section.

== Fauna ==
The greater white-fronted goose and bean goose are some of the bird species known to nest in the lake. Soluntakh has also been explored as one of the probable sites providing a habitat for the Siberian crane, a critically endangered species. Lake Soluntakh is rich in fish.

== See also ==
- List of lakes of Russia
