= Medvezhyi Islands =

Medvezhyi Islands Эhэлээх арыылар Медве́жьи острова́
- Island group
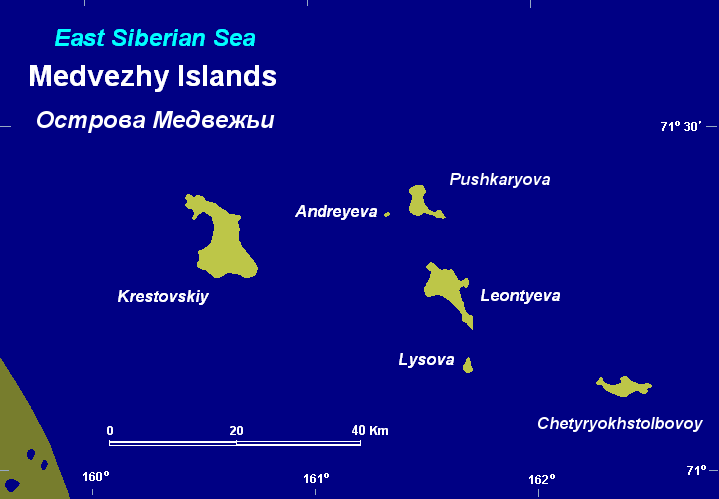
- Map of the Medvezhiy Islands.

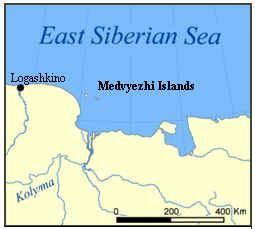

- Location within Sakha Republic
- Coordinates: 70°52′N 161°26′E
- Country: Russian Federation
- Federal subject: Far Eastern Federal District
- Republic: Sakha Republic

The Medvezhyi Islands, or Bear Islands (Russian: Медве́жьи острова́; Yakut: Эhэлээх арыылар, Eheleex Arıılar) is an uninhabited group of islands at the western end of the Kolyma Gulf of the East Siberian Sea.

== History ==
The first recorded European to report the existence of the Medvezhyi Islands was Russian explorer Yakov Permyakov in 1710. While sailing from the Lena to the Kolyma River, Permyakov observed the silhouette of the unknown island group in the then little explored East Siberian Sea.

In 1820-1824, during Ferdinand Wrangel's Arctic expedition to the East Siberian Sea and the Chukchi Sea, Arctic explorer Fyodor Matyushkin surveyed and mapped Chetyryokhstolbovoy Island in the Medvezhyi group.

On September 3, 1878, Adolf Erik Nordenskiöld recorded that he sailed close to the island group in the steamship Vega. This report was made during the famous expedition that made the whole length of the Northeast passage for the first time in history.

The group was also explored during the Arctic Ocean Hydrographic Expedition of 1910–1915.

== Geography ==
The Medvezhyi Islands are located about 100 kilometres (55 nautical miles) north of the mouths of the Kolyma River. They are part of the East Siberian Lowland. The coast of Siberia is about 35 km (19 nmi) southwest of Krestovsky, the largest island, which is about 15 km (9 1/2 mi) in length.

The sea surrounding the Medvezhyi Islands is covered with fast ice in the winter and the climate is severe. The surrounding sea is obstructed by pack ice even in the summer months. There is commercial fishing in the area of the islands during the summer.

This island group is a part of the territory of the Sakha Republic of Russia. As their name indicates, these islands are a refuge and breeding ground for polar bears.

=== Islands ===
There are six islands in the group: Krestovsky, Leontyev, Pushkarev, Lysova, Andreev and Chetyryokhstolbovoy, where there is a polar station which was inaugurated in 1933. The islands are formed of stacked granite, clay and shale. They are mostly covered with tundra vegetation.

=== Climate ===
Climate data for Medvezhyi Islands
Month	Jan	Feb	Mar	Apr	May	Jun	Jul	Aug	Sep	Oct	Nov	Dec	Year
Daily mean °C (°F)	−28.7 (−19.7)	−29.5 (−21.1)	−26.7 (−16.1)	−19.6 (−3.3)	−7.0 (19.4)	0.4 (32.7)	2.2 (36.0)	1.8 (35.2)	−0.7 (30.7)	−9.8 (14.4)	−21.2 (−6.2)	−26.8 (−16.2)	−13.8 (7.2)
Average precipitation mm (inches)	9.0 (0.35)	6.7 (0.26)	4.5 (0.18)	5.0 (0.20)	6.3 (0.25)	10.0 (0.39)	20.0 (0.79)	21.1 (0.83)	16.1 (0.63)	14.7 (0.58)	11.5 (0.45)	7.4 (0.29)	132.3 (5.21)
Average precipitation days (≥ 1.0 mm)	3.0	1.7	1.3	1.1	1.0	2.5	4.0	5.5	5.3	5.1	3.3	1.8	35.6
Mean monthly sunshine hours	0	48	205	292	233	245	230	126	57	39	5	0	1,480
Source: NOAA

== Features of the islands ==
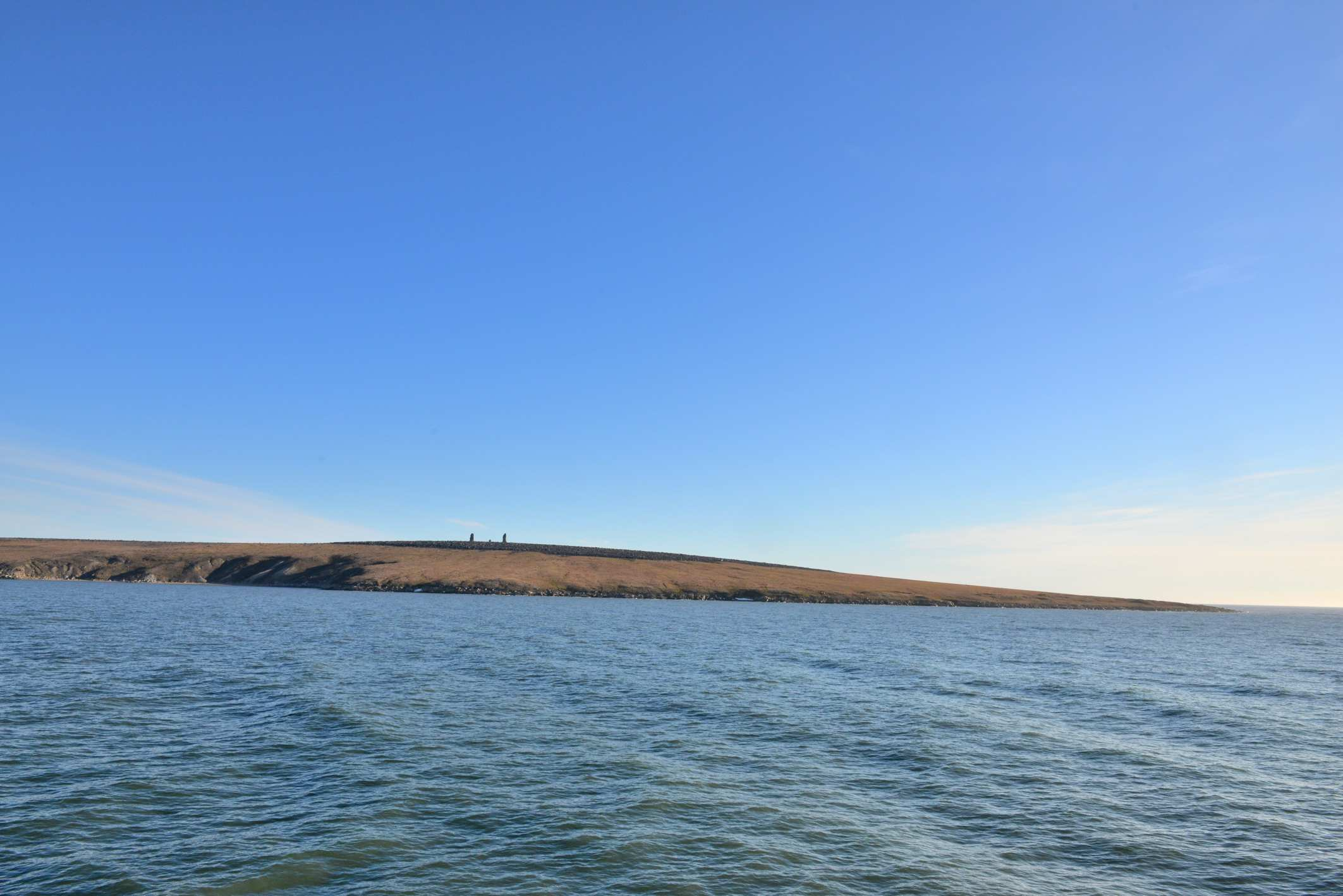
Chetyrokhstolbovoy Island (70°37‘50‘‘N, 162°22’30’’E)

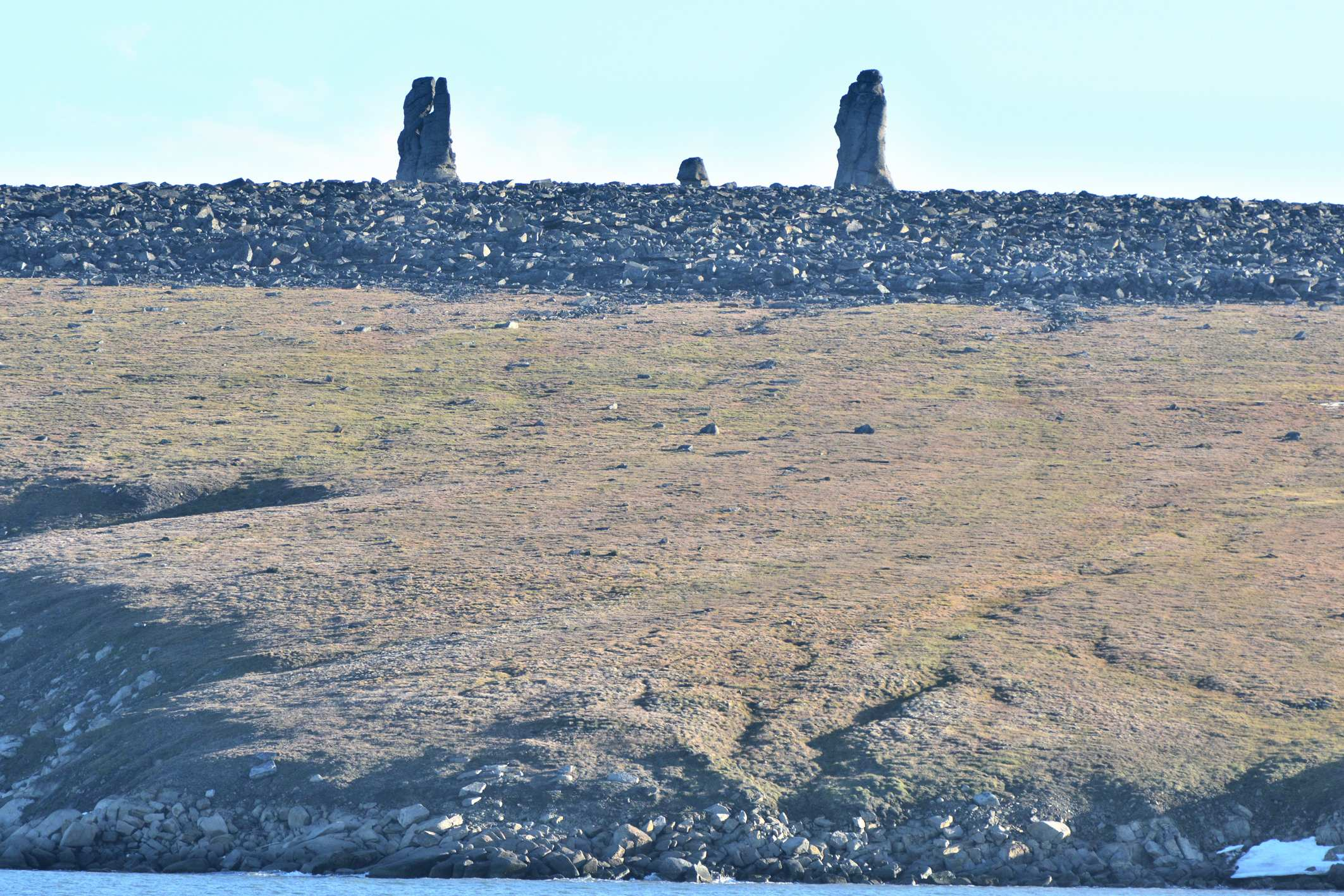
Kigilyakh stone pillars on Chetyrokhstolbovoy Island. Kigilyakh means "stone man" in Yakut.

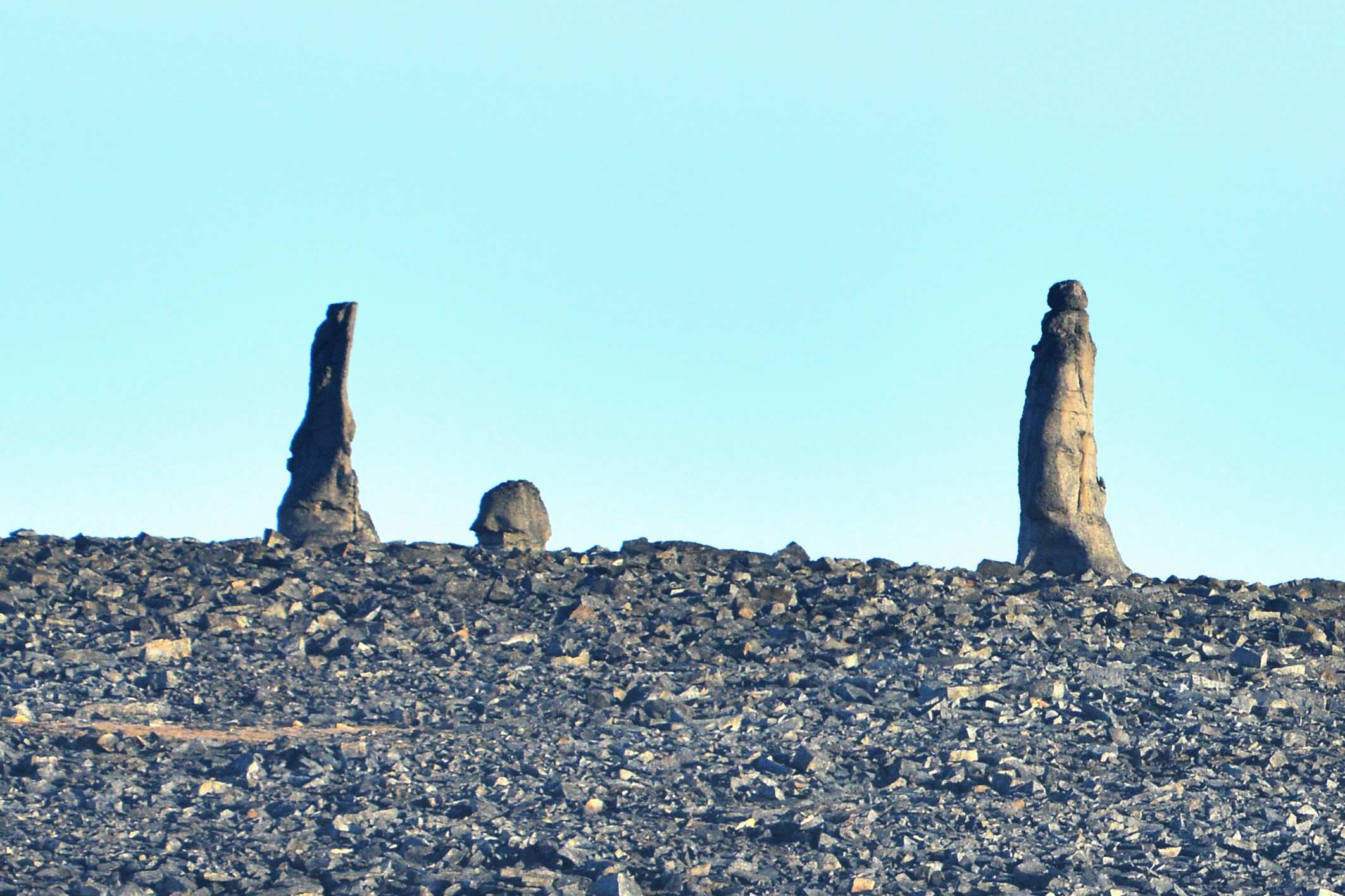
Kigilyakhs on Chetyrokhstolbovoy Island

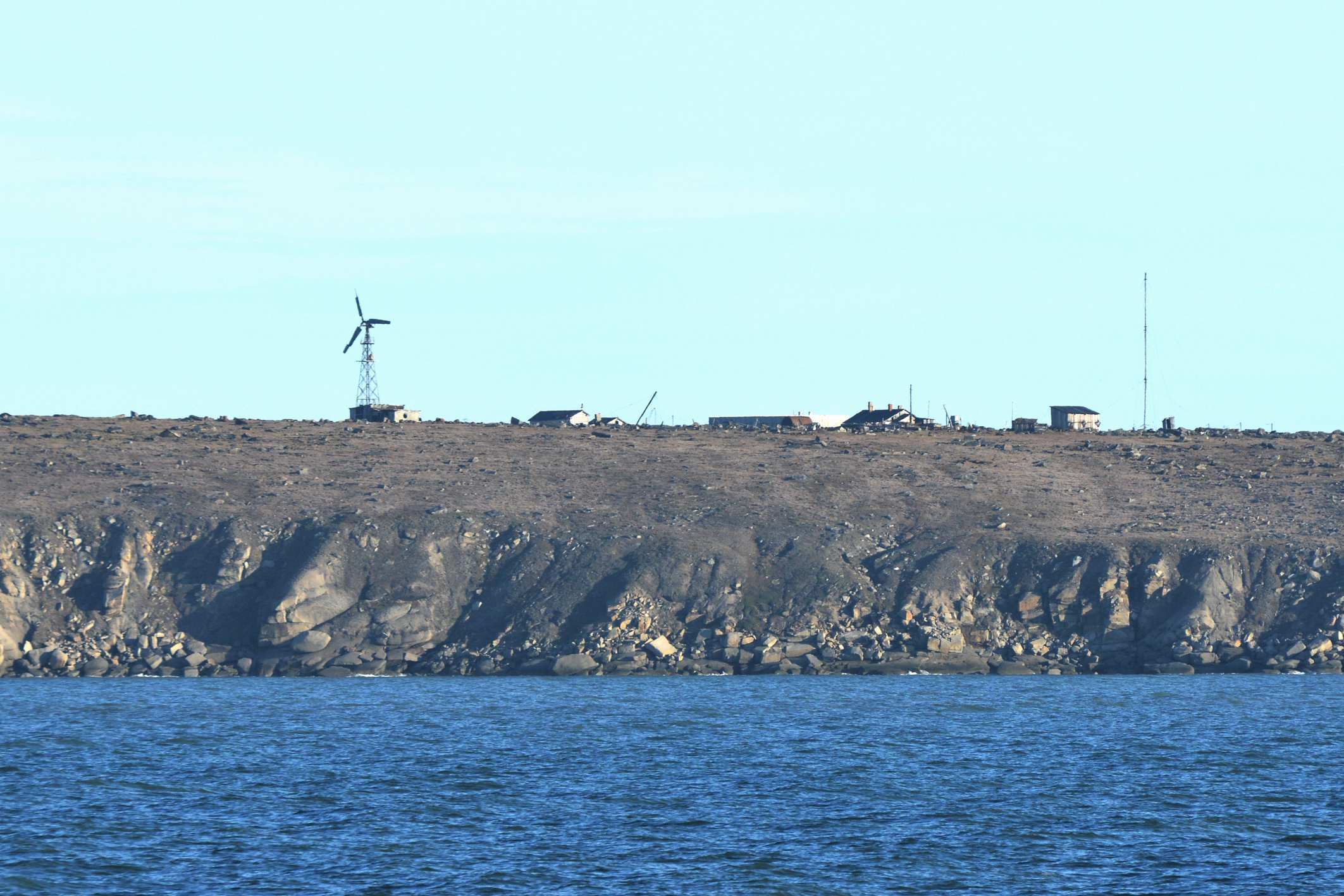
Chetyrokhstolbovoy Island (Polar Station)

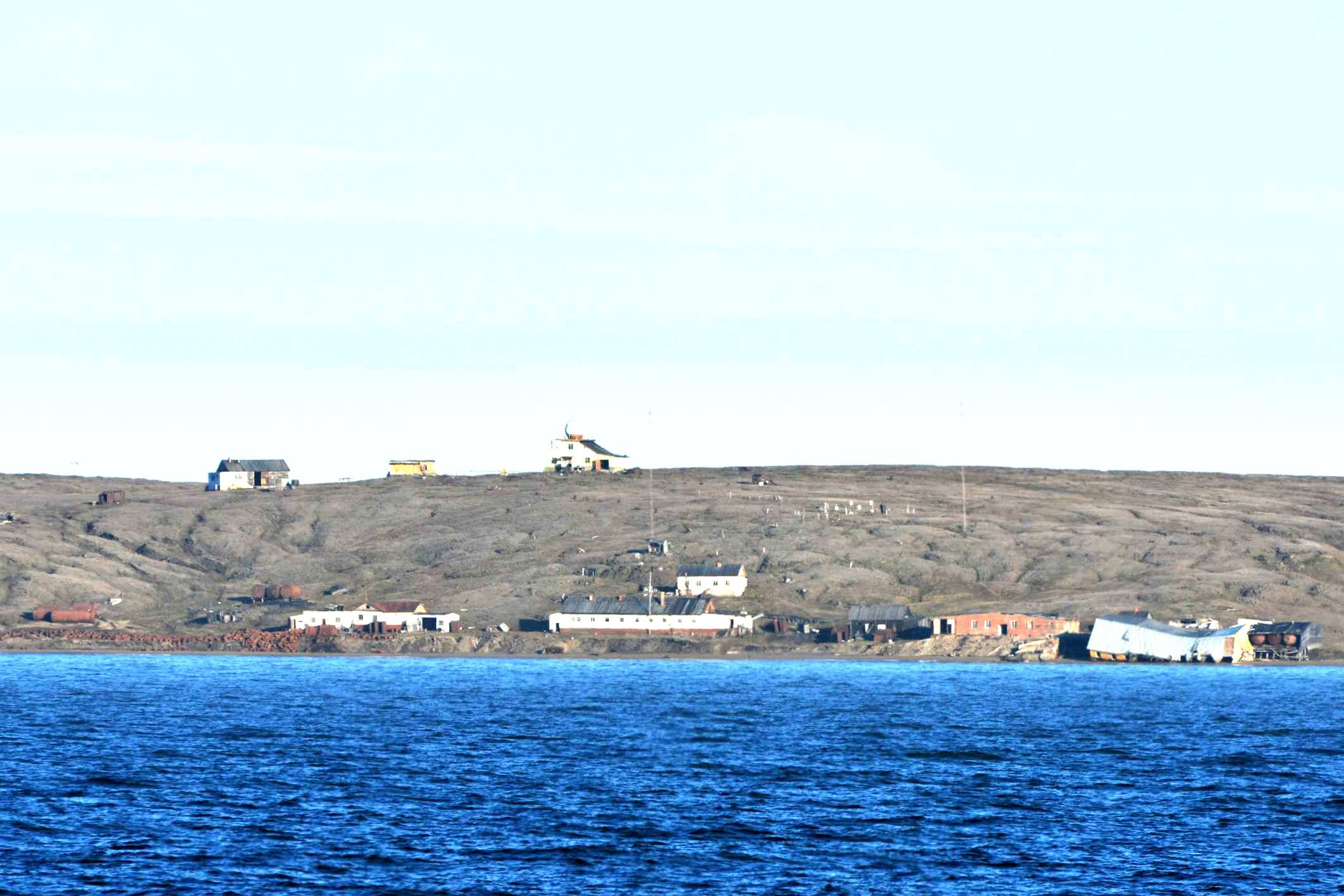
Chetyrokhstolbovoy Island

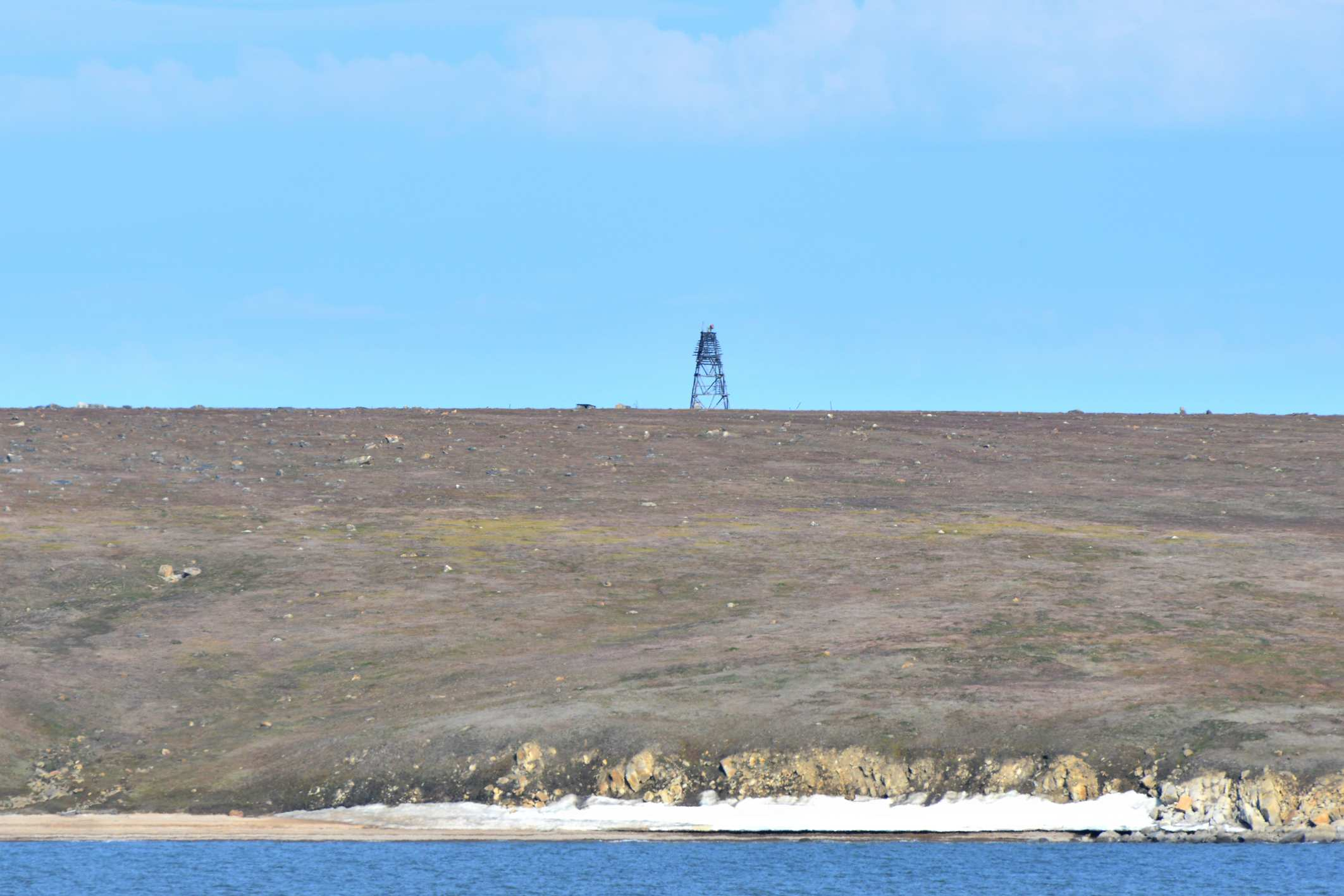
Krestovsky Island
(70°48’N, 160°40’E)

== See also ==
- List of research stations in the Arctic
- Fyodor Matyushkin
- Amateur Radio Expedition to Leontyeva Island, Medvezhyi Islands RI0LI
