= Polousny Range =

Mountain range in Russia

- Полоусный кряж / Полоуснай томтороот
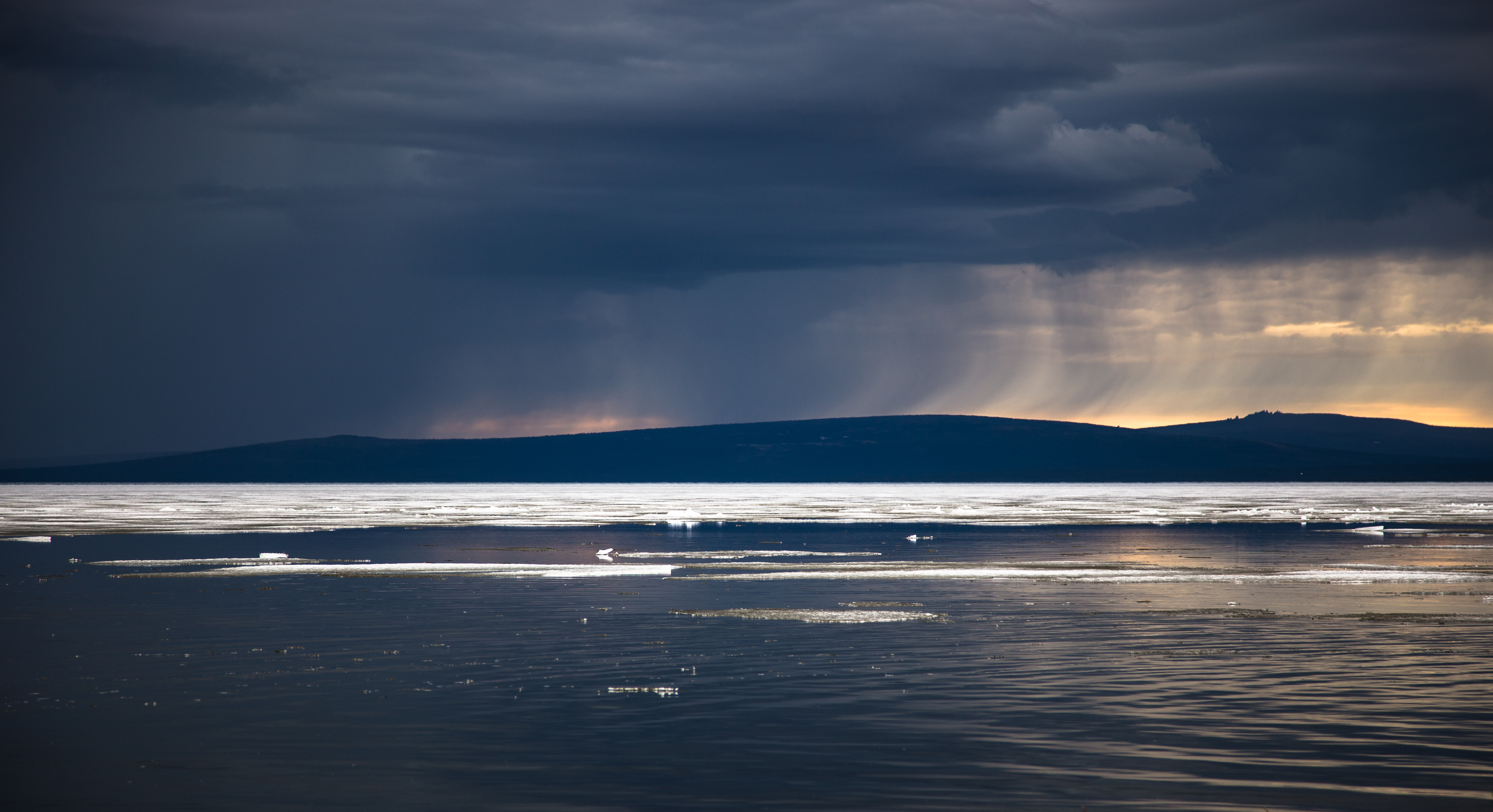
- The range's easternmost foothills by Lake Ozhogino

Highest point
- Elevation: 968 m (3,176 ft)

Dimensions
- Length: 175 km (109 mi)

Geography
- Location within Sakha Republic
- Country: Russia
- Federal subject: Sakha Republic
- Range coordinates: 69°50′N 140°0′E
- Parent range: Momsko-Chersk Region, East Siberian System

Geology
- Rock age(s): Jurassic, Mesozoic
- Rock type(s): Flyschoid sand silt and clay sediments

The Polousny Range (Russian: Полоусный кряж; Yakut: Полоуснай томтороот) is a mountain range in the Sakha Republic, Far Eastern Federal District, Russia.

This range is one of the areas of Yakutia where kigilyakhs are found.

== History ==
The area of the Polousny Range was first mapped by geographer and ethnologist Baron Gerhard von Maydell (1835–1894) during his pioneering research of East Siberia.

The Chondon mammoth was discovered in 2013, at the feet of the Polousny Range in the Chondon basin, 66 km south-west of the village of Tumat.

== Geography ==
The Polousny Range is part of the Momsko-Chersk Mountain Region (Russian: Момско-Черская область). It rises in the southern area of the Yana-Indigirka Lowland, north of the Aby Lowland in the Sakha region. It is made up of mountains of middle height and smooth slopes. It includes separate low mountain ranges with stretches of plain in between roughly aligned from east to west.

The main ridge stretches in a roughly east/ west direction from the headwaters of the Khroma River to the Indigirka for about 175 kilometers (109 mi). The highest peak is 968 metres (3,176 ft) high. In the east, the Ulakhan-Sis, a prolongation of the range on the other side of the Indigirka River, stretches eastwards. To the west rises the Kyun-Tas and southwest of it the Selennyakh Range. Lakes Ozhogino and Suturuokha are located by the southern slopes of the eastern end of the range. The sources of the Allaikha and the Byoryolyokh, two important tributaries of the Indigirka, are located north of the range.

The lower slopes of the mountains have larch forests and forest-tundra vegetation, while the higher altitudes are covered by mountain tundra.

== Geology ==
In the context of the singularity of the geology of the Polousny Range, Russian geomorphologist M. Groswald commented:

According to V. Spector, the structure of the Polousny Range consists of Upper Jurassic schists and sandstones, which are cut off by a leveling surface covered with Pliocene pebbles . But the most interesting thing is that, contrary to the geological logic of the whole region, the blocks and plates of the same Jurassic rocks are pulled up on the northern slope of the ridge —and pulled from the north at that...
