= Yakov Permyakov =

Russian explorer

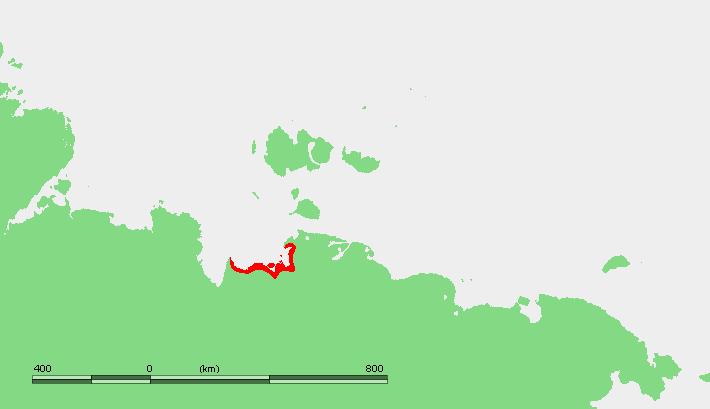
Location of Yana Bay in northern Siberia, on whose frozen surface Yakov Permyakov was murdered

Yakov Permyakov (Russian: Яков Пермяков; died 1712) was a Russian seafarer, explorer, merchant, and Cossack.

In 1710, while sailing from the Lena River to the Kolyma River, Permyakov observed the silhouette of two unknown island groups in the sea. Those islands would later be named Bolshoy Lyakhovsky and the Medvyezhi Islands.

In 1712, Permyakov and his companion Merkury Vagin crossed Yana Bay from the mouth of the Yana River to Bolshoy Lyakhovsky over the ice and explored the then-unknown island. Permyakov and Vagin were murdered on the way back from their exploration by mutineering expedition members. The Cossacks took Permyakov's deceased body down to the ice and set it on fire. No one knows what the rebellious Cossacks did with the ashes, but Yakov Permyakov's remains were never found.
