= Druzhina, Sakha Republic =

Village in Sakha Republic, Russia

Coordinates: 68°14′N 145°18′E

Druzhina (Russian: Дружи́на) is a village in Abyysky Ulus of the Sakha Republic, Russia, a port by the left bank of the Indigirka River. It is located in the Aby Lowland, about 2,800 km northeast of Yakutsk and 120 km southwest from the Belaya Gora, ulus' administrative center. Druzhina served as the administrative center of then Abyysky District (a predecessor of the modern Abyysky Ulus) until 1974.

The village is reachable either by the Indigirka River or by winter road (zimnik) from Verkhoyansk.

The main occupations of the dwindling population are fishing and hunting. The village has a meteorological station.

== See also ==
- Druzhina River
