= Druzhina (river) =

- Location in the Sakha Republic, Russia

Location
- Country: Russia

Physical characteristics
- Source
  - location: Ulakhan-Koyol
- Mouth: Indigirka
  - coordinates: 68°12′00″N 145°20′24″E
- Length: 199 km (124 mi)
- Basin size: 1,360 square kilometres (530 sq mi)

Basin features
- Progression: Indigirka→ East Siberian Sea

The Druzhina (Russian: Дружи́на) is a river in Yakutia in Russia, a left tributary of the Indigirka.

== Course ==
It has its source at the Ulakhan-Koyol Lake. The river flows eastwards, meandering across a lake-dotted area of the Aby Lowland. The length of the Druzhina is 199 kilometres (124 mi). The area of its drainage basin is 1,360 square kilometres (530 mi^{2}).

The Druzhina freezes up in October and remains icebound until late May or early June.

== See also ==
- Druzhina, Sakha Republic
