= Merkury Vagin =

Russian explorer (died 1712)

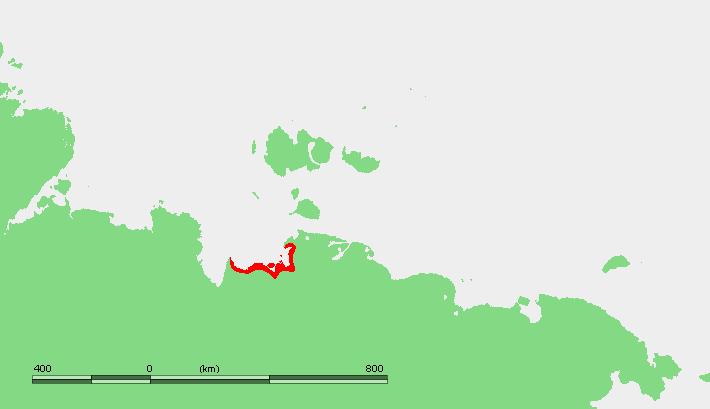
Location of Yana Bay in northern Siberia, on whose frozen surface Merkury Vagin was murdered

Merkury Vagin (Russian: Меркурий Вагин) (died 1712) was a Russian Cossack, zemleprokhodets, Arctic explorer.

In 1712, together with Yakov Permyakov, Vagin explored the region of the eastern Laptev Sea coast. His exploration included Bolshoy Lyakhovsky Island, the southernmost of the New Siberian Archipelago. With a group of Cossacks they crossed the Yana Bay over the ice from the mouth of the Yana River; after reaching Bolshoy Lyakhovsky, they explored the then-unknown island, which had been reported by Permyakov two years earlier.

Vagin and Permyakov were murdered on the return voyage by mutineering expedition members. The Cossacks took their dead bodies down to the ice and set them on fire. No one knows what the rebellious Cossacks did with the ashes, but Merkury Vagin's remains were never found.
