= Gusinaya (river) =

River in Yakutia, Russia

Gusinaya (Xaastaax) Гусиная / Хаастаах
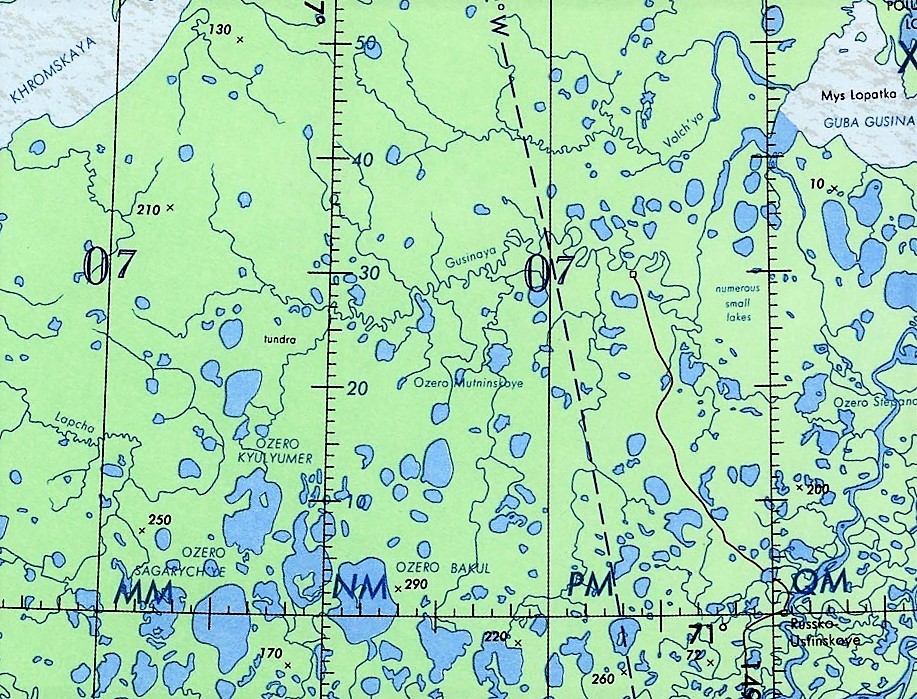
- Course of the Gusinaya ONC map section

- Mouth location in Yakutia, Russia

Location
- Country: Russia

Physical characteristics
- Source
  - location: Empe-Talalakh
  - coordinates: 71°39′34″N 146°19′24″E
  - elevation: 26 metres (85 ft)
- Mouth: East Siberian Sea
  - location: Gusinaya Bay
  - coordinates: 71°40′59″N 148°52′52″E
  - elevation: 0 metres (0 ft)
- Length: 278 km (173 mi)
- Basin size: 5,980 km^{2} (2,310 sq mi)

The Gusinaya (Russian: Гусиная; Yakut: Хаастаах, Xaastaax) is a river in the Sakha Republic (Yakutia), Russia. It has a length of 278 kilometres (173 mi) and a drainage basin area of 5,980 square kilometres (2,310 mi^{2}).

The river flows north of the Arctic Circle, across territories of the Allaikhovsky District marked by permafrost. There are no settlements along its course, only some hunting huts.

== Course ==
The Gusinaya has its sources in the southeastern shore of Empe-Talalakh (Эмпе-Талалах) lake of the northern end of the Yana-Indigirka Lowland, East Siberian Lowland. The river flows roughly southeastwards across partially swampy tundra until the confluence of the 35 km (22 mi) long Alyn-Ergiter-Salaata (Алын-Эргитэр-Салаата), after which it turns eastward. Its channel meanders strongly all along among numerous lakes, some of them quite large. In the lower course the river divides into channels and turns southeast and then northeast, before emptying into the Gusinaya Bay of the East Siberian Sea to the south of the mouth of the Volchya.

=== Tributaries ===
The main tributaries of the Gusinaya are the 115 km (71 mi) long Chaikhana (Чайхана) and the 110 km (68 mi) long Mutnaya (Мутная) on the right. There are about 3,000 lakes in the basin, totaling an area of 418 km^{2} (161 sq mi). The river is frozen between the beginning of October and mid June.

== See also ==
- List of rivers of Russia
