= Aby Lowland =

Plains in the Sakha Republic, Russia

Aby Lowland Абыйская низменность (Russian)
- Alluvial plain
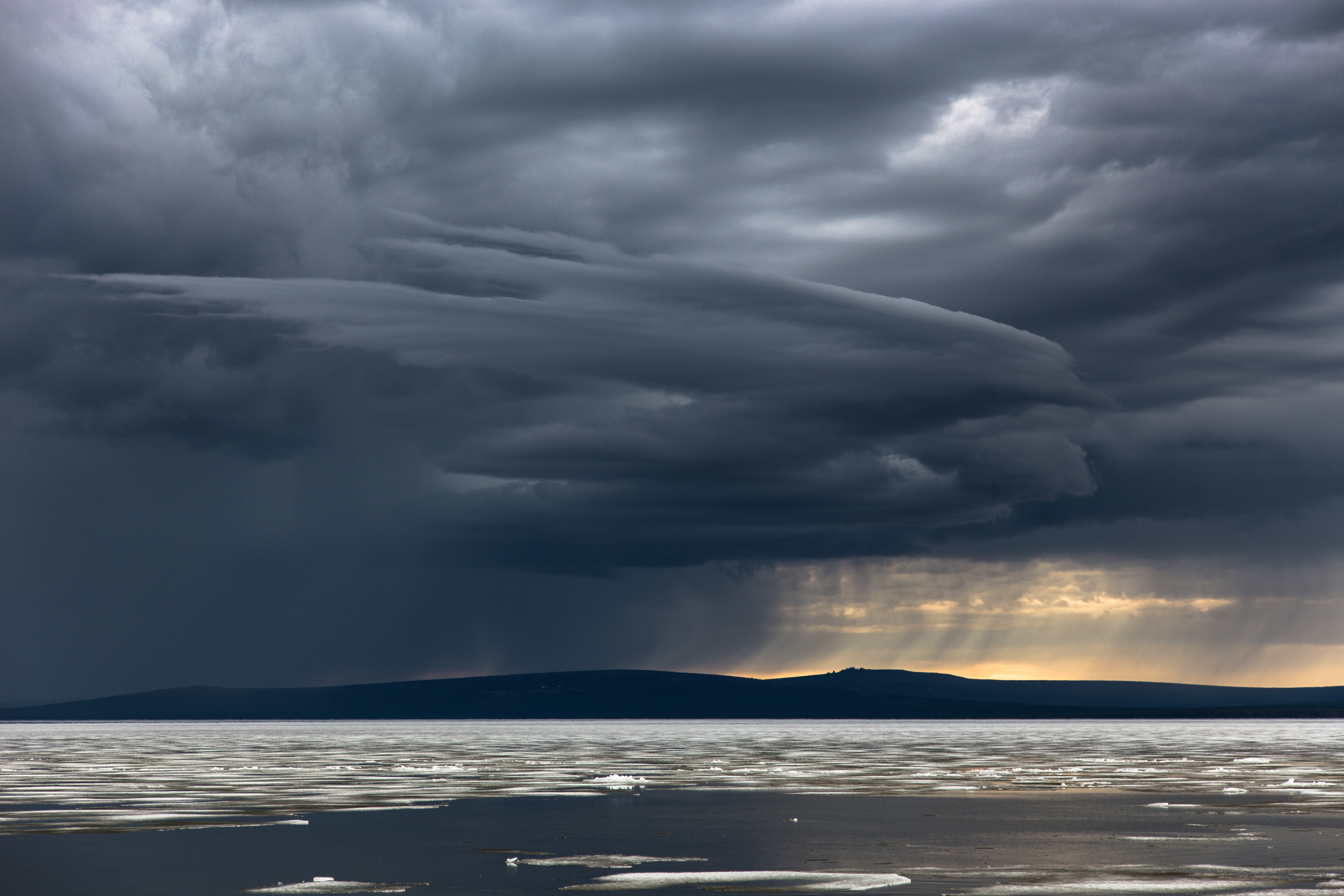
- View of Lake Ozhogino

- Location in Sakha, Russian Far East
- Coordinates: 68°20′N 144°30′E
- Location: Sakha Republic, Russia
- Part of: Yana-Kolyma Lowland

Area
  - Total: 1,500 km^{2} (580 sq mi)
- Elevation: 94 meters (308 ft)

The Aby Lowland (Russian: Абыйская низменность; Yakut: Абый Намтала, romanized: Abıy Namtala) is a low alluvial plain located in the Sakha Republic, Far Eastern Federal District, Russia. Administratively most of the territory of the lowland is part of Aby District (Aby Ulus).

== Geography ==
The lowland is crossed by the Indigirka River in its middle course. Besides many smaller rivers and streams, three large left hand tributaries of the great river flow into it, the Selennyakh, Uyandina (with the Khatyngnakh) and Druzhina rivers. The Badyarikha limits the area in the east. The area is flat and mostly marshy, the average height of the plain being between 30 meters (98 ft) and 94 meters (308 ft) above sea level. The rivers are generally slow-flowing and meandering, connected by channels and with very boggy shores. The Aby Lakes, mostly small and numbering over 15,000, are dotting the lowlands. The largest are Lake Ozhogino and Lake Suturuokha.

The Aby Lowland is surrounded by mountains on all sides, with the Selennyakh Range and Esteriktyakh-Tas in the west, the Moma Range in the south and southeast, the Alazeya Plateau in the east and the Polousny Range in the north. The latter separates it from the Yana-Indigirka Lowland.

In the winter the plains are frosty owing to stagnation of cold air. There is usually light snowfall. Summers are short, but with rather high temperatures considering the latitude.

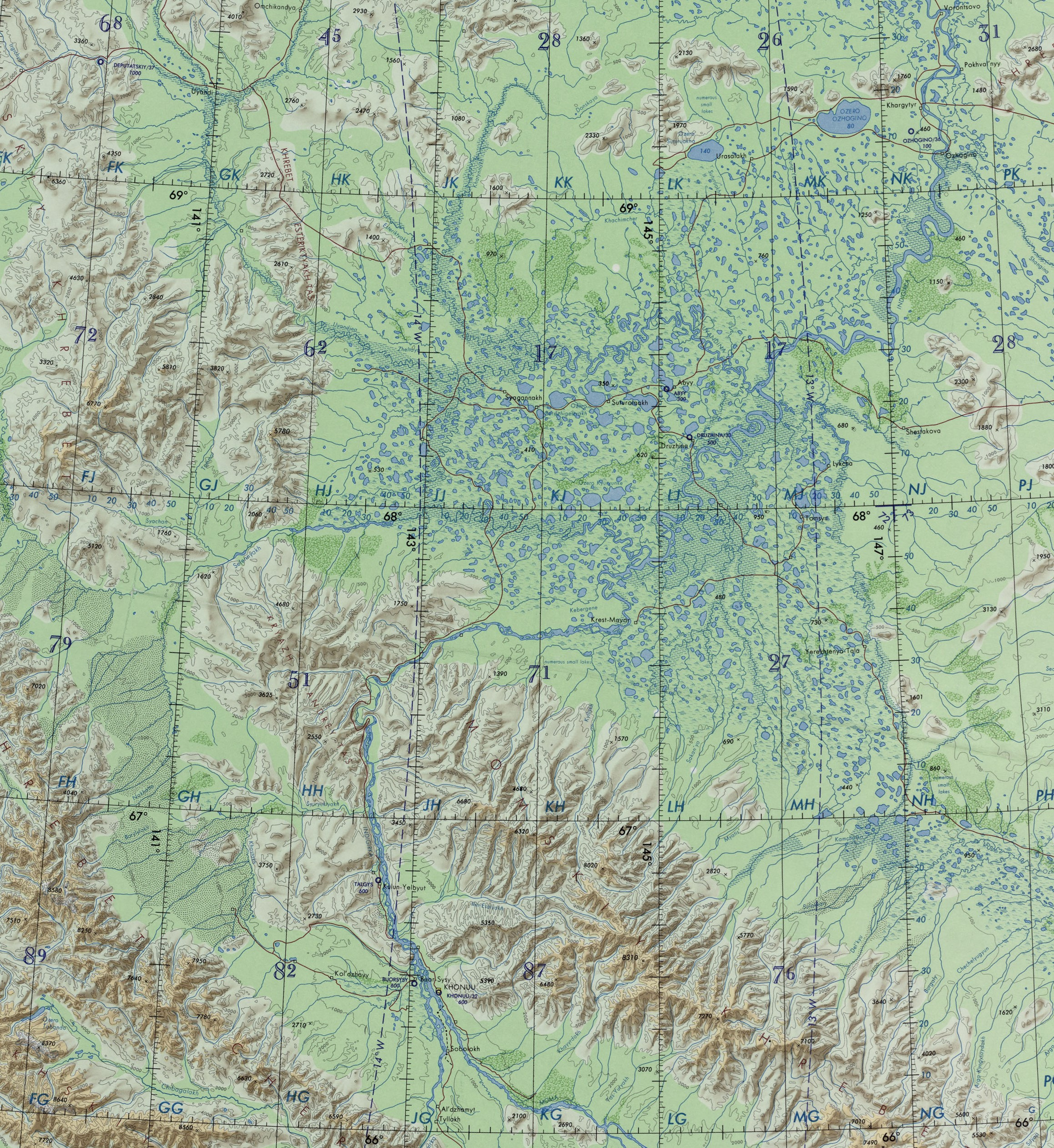
The Aby Lowland on the upper right half of the picture.

== See also ==
- Druzhina, Sakha Republic
