= Gusinaya Lyaga =

Gusinaya Lyaga Гусиная Ляга
- Selo
- Location within Altai Krai Location within Russia
- Coordinates: 53°24′N 78°23′E
- Country: Russia
- Region: Altai Krai
- District: Burlinsky District
- Time zone: UTC+7:00

Gusinaya Lyaga (Russian: Гусиная Ляга) is a rural locality (a selo) in Partizansky Selsoviet, Burlinsky District, Altai Krai, Russia. The population was 275 as of 2013. It was founded in 1907. There are 5 streets.

== Geography ==
Gusinaya Lyaga is located 12 km northeast of Burla (the district's administrative centre) by road. Novopeschanoye is the nearest rural locality.
