= Bogdashkina =

River in Yakutia, Russia

Bogdashkina Богдашкина
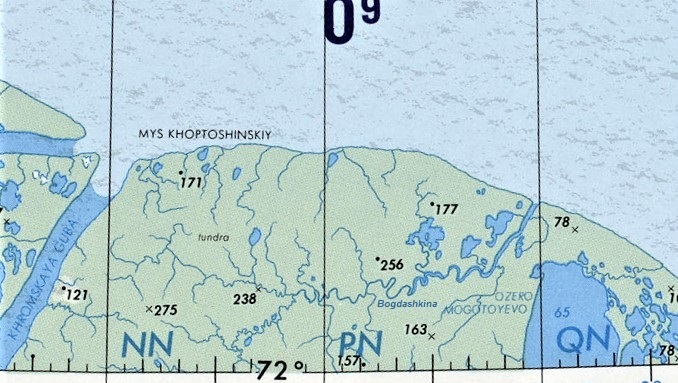
- Bogdashkina course ONC map section

- Mouth location in Yakutia, Russia

Location
- Country: Russia

Physical characteristics
- Source
  - location: Unnamed lake
  - coordinates: 71°59′29″N 147°25′13″E
- Mouth: East Siberian Sea
  - coordinates: 72°13′58″N 148°59′24″E
  - elevation: 0 metres (0 ft)
- Length: 142 km (88 mi)
- Basin size: 1,920 km^{2} (740 sq mi)

The Bogdashkina (Russian: Богдашкина) is a river in the Sakha Republic (Yakutia), Russia. It has a length of 142 kilometres (88 mi) and a drainage basin area of 1,920 square kilometres (740 mi^{2}).

The river flows north of the Arctic Circle, across desolate territories of the Allaikhovsky District.

== Course ==
Not counting the New Siberian Islands the Bogdashkina is the northernmost sizeable river basin of Yakutia. It has its sources in a small unnamed lake of the northern end of the East Siberian Lowland. The river flows roughly northeastwards across the tundra in the uppermost section of its course. Then it flows eastwards, with its channel meandering all along. In its last stretch the Bogdashkina turns north and its mouth widens as it empties into the East Siberian Sea, roughly halfway between Khroma Bay and Gusinaya Bay. Lake Mogotoyevo, a coastal lagoon, lies to the east of the river mouth.

=== Tributaries ===
The main tributary of the Bogdashkina is the 51 km (32 mi) long Maly Bogdashkina on the left, as well as the 31 km (19 mi) long Bezymyanka (Безымянка) and the 26 km (16 mi) long Iterbashevo (Итербашево) on the right. There are many small lakes in the basin, including Shilikino lake just west of the last stretch of the Bogdashkina.

== Fauna ==
In the summer the river mouth area is a breeding place for migratory birds, including waders and the spectacled eider.

== See also ==
- List of rivers of Russia
