= Yana-Indigirka Lowland =

Large low alluvial plain in northern Siberia, Far Eastern Federal District, Russia

Yana-Indigirka Lowland Яно-Индигирская низменность
- Alluvial plain
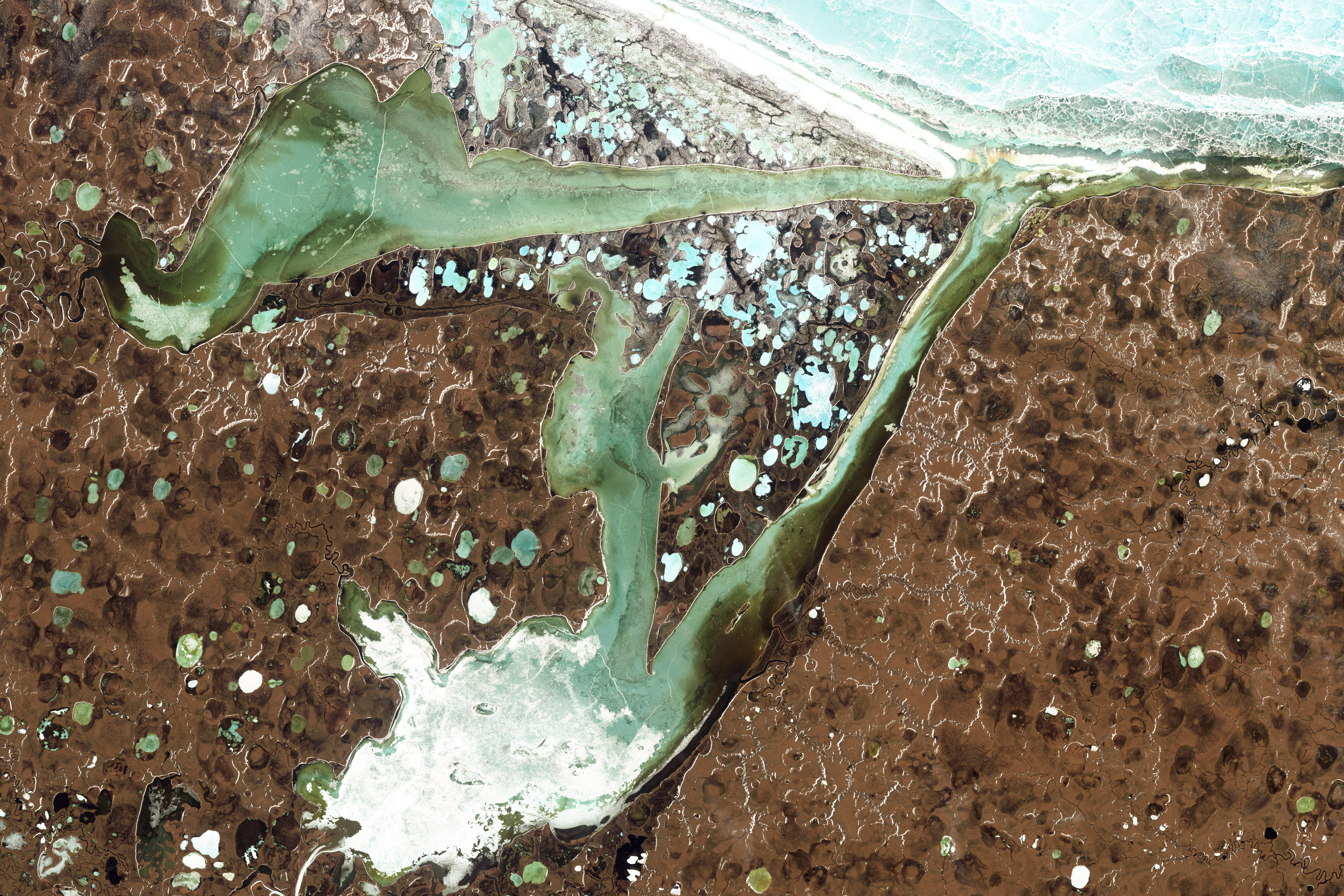
- NASA picture of the Khroma and Omulyakh bays at the northern end of the lowland.

- Location in Sakha, Russian Far East
- Coordinates: 71°N 142°E
- Location: Sakha Republic, Russia
- Part of: Yana-Kolyma Lowland

Area
  - Total: 95,000 km^{2} (37,000 sq mi)

Dimensions
  - Length: 600 kilometers (370 mi)
  - Width: 300 kilometers (190 mi)
- Elevation: 80 meters (260 ft)

The Yana-Indigirka Lowland (Russian: Яно-Индигирская низменность; Yakut: Дьааҥы - Индигир намтала, romanized: Caañı - İndigir namtala) is a large, low alluvial plain located in northern Siberia, Far Eastern Federal District, Russia.

Administratively most of the territory of the lowland is part of the Sakha Republic (Yakutia). There are inhabited centers of population in the lowlands such as Chokurdakh, Olenegorsk and Nizhneyansk, but these are very few and scattered.

== Geography ==
The lowland is named after the Yana River in the west and the Indigirka River in the east and is crossed by both rivers in their middle and lower courses. The area is mostly flat and very marshy, its northern limits extending for over 600 kilometers (370 mi) from the Buor Khaya Gulf of the Laptev Sea in the west to the delta of river Indigirka in the East Siberian Sea in the east. It is limited by the Kyundyulyun, the northern end of the Selennyakh Range and the Polousny Range in the south.

The Yana-Indigirka Lowland is roughly crescent-shaped, reaching a maximum width in its central part of 300 kilometers (190 mi). The average height of the plain is between 30 meters (98 ft) and 80 meters (260 ft) above sea level. There is an immense number of lakes dotting the lowlands, the largest of which are Lake Bustakh with an area of 249 square kilometers (96 sq mi), as well as Orotko and Soluntakh. The Yana-Indigirka Lowland also includes the lower course of the Omoloy River at the western end, the vast delta of river Yana, as well as the Byoryolyokh and Allaikha lower course tributaries of the Indigirka in the east. Other important rivers of the lowland are the Chondon, with its tributaries Nuchcha and Buor-Yuryakh, the San-Yuryakh, Sellyakh, Muksunuokha, Kyuyol-Yuryakh, Khroma —with the Uryung-Ulakh, the Sundrun, Dyagarin, Bogdashkina and Gusinaya, among other smaller rivers and streams. The large rivers meander and widen in the plain, reaching widths between 350 meters (1,150 ft) and 500 meters (1,600 ft).

The Yana-Indigirka Lowland is part of the wider Yana-Kolyma system of lowlands, which includes the Aby Lowland to the south of the Polousny Range and the Kolyma Lowland in the eastern side. There are residual ridges of bedrock, up to 558 meters (1,831 ft) high, rising above the lowland, the northernmost of which is the Kondakov Plateau.

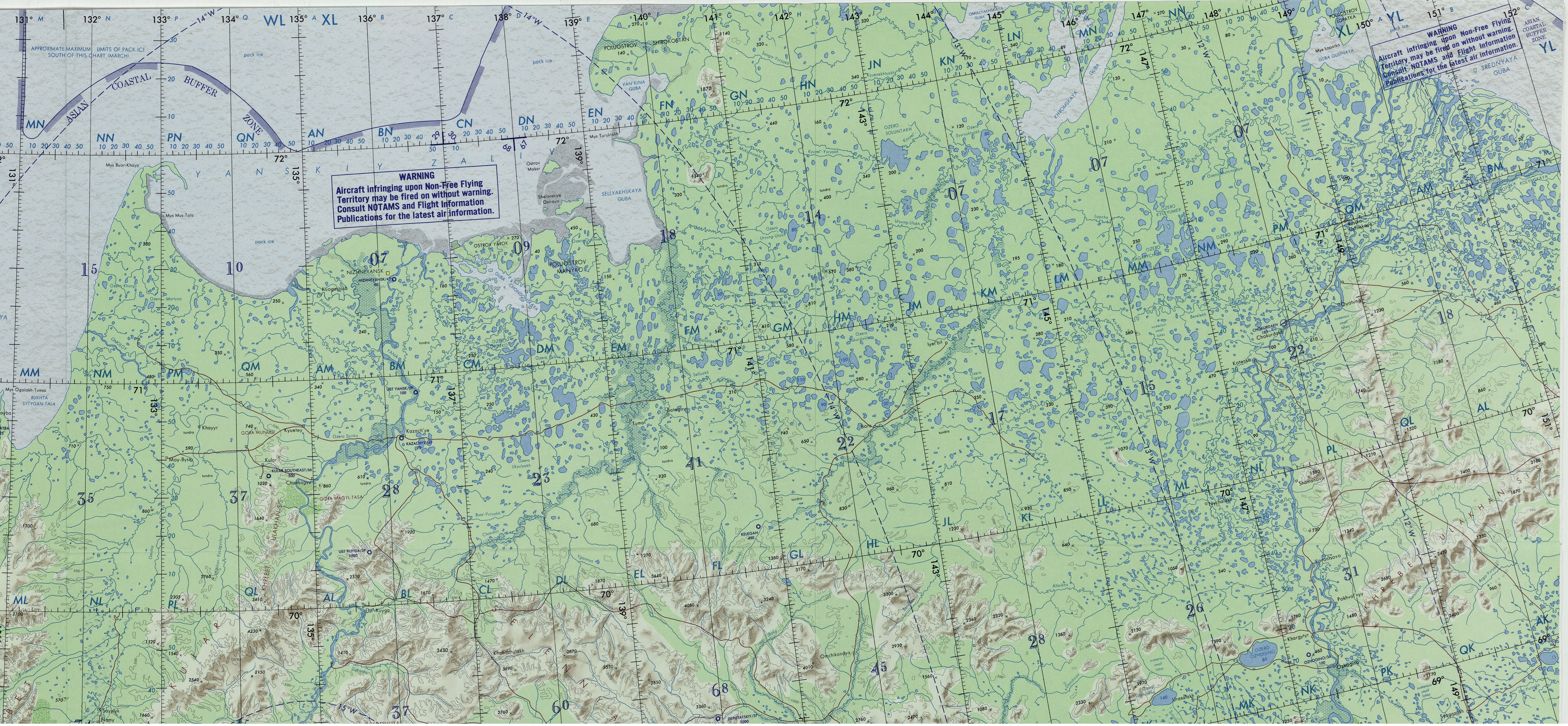
Yana-Indigirka Lowland map section

== Soil ==
The lowlands have a thermokarst ground, composed of various kinds of marine, river and lake sediments with a high content of fossil ice owing to the prevalence of permafrost. The features of the local relief include alas depressions with lakes and swamps, as well as polygonal soils. Along the banks of rivers, seas and lakes there are baydzharakh mounds.

== Climate ==
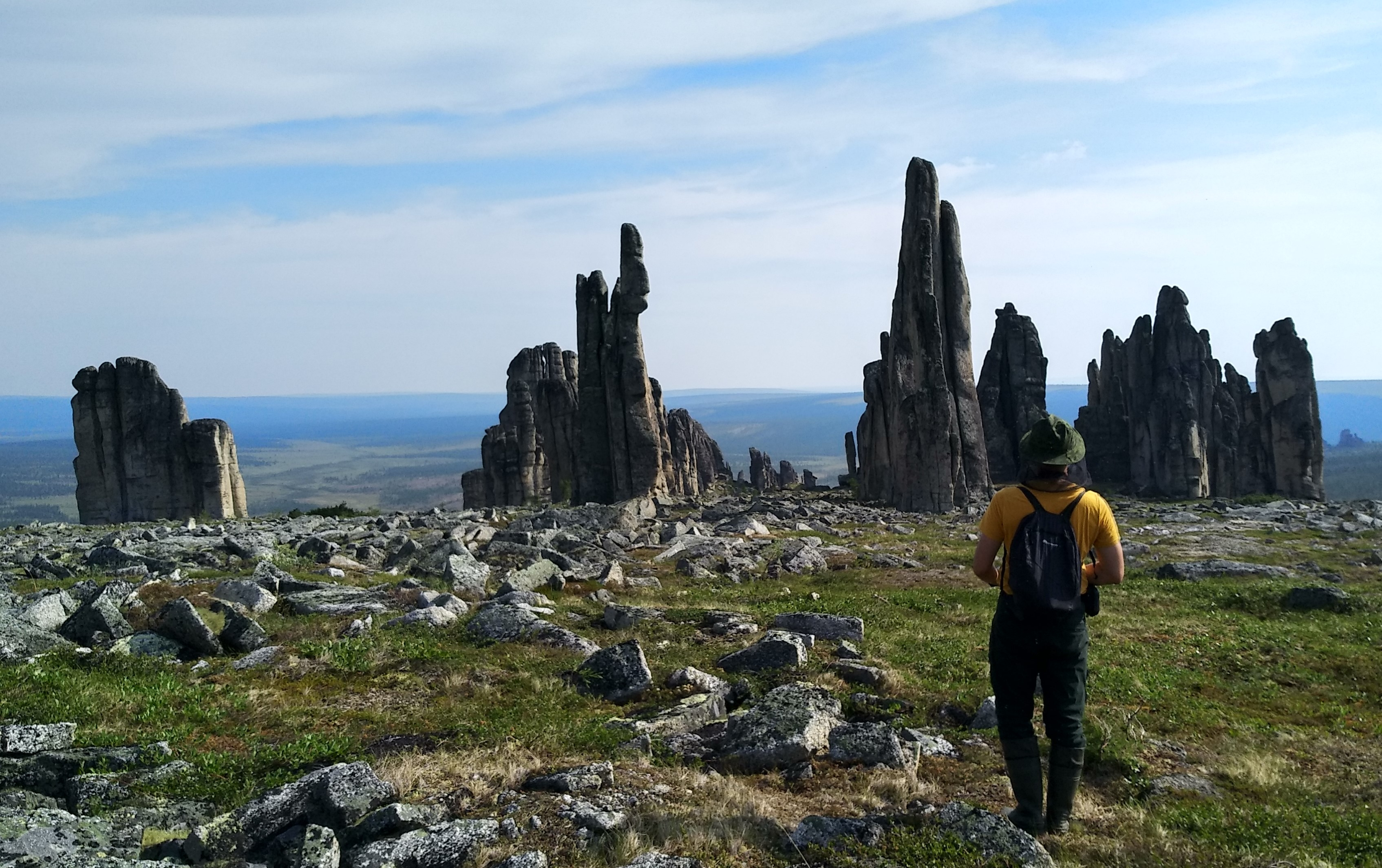
Harsh Arctic climate in the Yana-Indigirka Lowland shapes bizarre Ulakhan-Sis Range rock formations

The climate of the lowland is severe, with long, bitter winters. The vast plain is wholly frozen, under ice and snow, between early October and the end of May or early June, according to the year. Once the ice melts large areas become flooded and some islands and sandbanks completely disappear underwater. After the floods dwindle a period of summer/early autumn low water begins until the winter frost sets in.

The average temperature in January is −32 °C (−26 °F) by the seashore and −36 °C (−33 °F) inland. Summers usually stay chilly, especially by the seashore.

== Flora and fauna ==
At the northern limits, above the 69th parallel, the lowland seashores are covered with moss, lichen and shrub tundra. In the southern part there are forest-tundra zones, especially along river valleys, the forest cover consisting of thinly scattered larch.

There are reindeer herds in the Yana-Indigirka Lowland, as well as wolves and arctic fox, among other animals. the waters of rivers and lakes are rich in various species of fish, such as Siberian vendace, chir, muksun, nelma and omul.

== See also ==
- Baydzharakh
- Reindeer in Russia
- Northeast Siberian coastal tundra
