= Tumat =

Tumat Тумат Тумат (Sakha)
- Selo
- Interactive map of Tumat
- Location of Tumat Tumat (Sakha Republic)
- Coordinates: 70°44′00″N 139°14′00″E
- Country: Russia
- Federal subject: Sakha Republic
- Administrative district: Ust-Yansky District
- Rural okrugSelsoviet: Tumatsky National Rural Okrug

Population (2010 Census)
  - Total: 533
  - Estimate (2021): 489 (−8.3%)

Administrative status
  - Capital of: Tumatsky National Rural Okrug

Municipal status
  - Municipal district: Ust-Yansky Municipal District
  - Rural settlement: Tumatsky National Rural Settlement
  - Capital of: Tumatsky National Rural Settlement
- Time zone: UTC+
- Postal code: 678564
- OKTMO ID: 98656420101

Tumat (Russian: Тумат; Yakut: Тумат) is a rural locality (a selo), the only inhabited settlement and the administrative center of Tumatsky National Rural Okrug of Ust-Yansky District in the Sakha Republic, Russia, located 656 kilometers (408 mi) from Deputatsky, the administrative center of the district. Its population as of the 2010 Census was 533, of whom 286 were male and 247 female, down from 577 recorded during the 2002 Census.

== Geography ==
The village is located by the right bank of the Chondon river, a little upstream from its confluence with the Nuchcha. There are numerous lakes near Tumat. Orotko, located to the northeast, is one of the largest.

== Fossil specimen found at Tumat ==
Two canine specimen (wolves) preserved in permafrost have been found nearby Tumat:

- Tumat (1, ♀): A female about 3 months, age 12.400–14.400 y, found in 2011.
- Tumat (2, ♂): A male puppy, age 12.400–14.400 y, found in 2015 nearby the first place, so it is likely that they died at a similar time.
