= Chondon =

Chondon Чондон / Чондоон
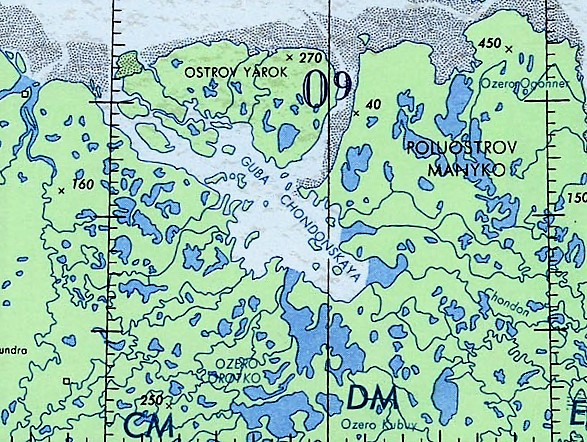
- Mouths of the Chondon ONC map section

- Mouth location in the Sakha Republic, Russia

Location
- Country: Yakutia, Russia

Physical characteristics
- Source
  - location: Selennyakh Range
  - coordinates: 69°48′35″N 137°55′48″E
  - elevation: 640 m (2,100 ft)
- Mouth
  - location: Chondon Bay; Laptev Sea
  - coordinates: 71°14′25″N 138°9′41″E
  - elevation: 0 m (0 ft)
- Length: 606 km (377 mi)
- Basin size: 18,900 km^{2} (7,300 sq mi)
- Discharge
  - average: 20 m^{3}/s (710 cu ft/s)

The Chondon (Russian: Чондон; Yakut: Чондоон, romanized: Çondôn) is a river in Ust-Yansky District, Sakha Republic (Yakutia), Russia. It is 606 kilometres (377 mi) long, with a drainage basin of 18,900 square kilometres (7,300 mi^{2}).

The Chondon mammoth was discovered in 2013 in the Chondon basin, at the feet of the Polousny Range, 66 km south-west of the village of Tumat. It had died at the age of 47 to 50 years.

== Course ==
The river begins in the northern slopes of the Selennyakh Range at an elevation of 640 metres (2,100 ft). It flows roughly northwards west of the Yana River across the Yana-Indigirka Lowland meandering strongly among marshy areas and lakes. In its lower course it flows parallel to the Sellyakh in the east. Yarok Island lies across its mouth, in the Chondon Bay, by the Yana Bay of the Laptev Sea.

There are over 6,600 lakes in the Chondon basin, with a total area of 497 km^{2} (192 sq mi). The river freezes yearly between early October and early June.

=== Tributaries ===
The main tributaries of the Chondon are the 170 km (110 mi) long Buor-Yuryakh, with its source in the Kyundyulyun, from the left, as well as the 142 km (88 mi) long Ygaanna (Ыгаанньа), the 104 km (65 mi) long Dodomo and the 243 km (151 mi) long Nuchcha (Нучча) from the right.

== Fauna ==
Among the fish species found in the river, muksun, nelma, omul and vendace deserve mention.

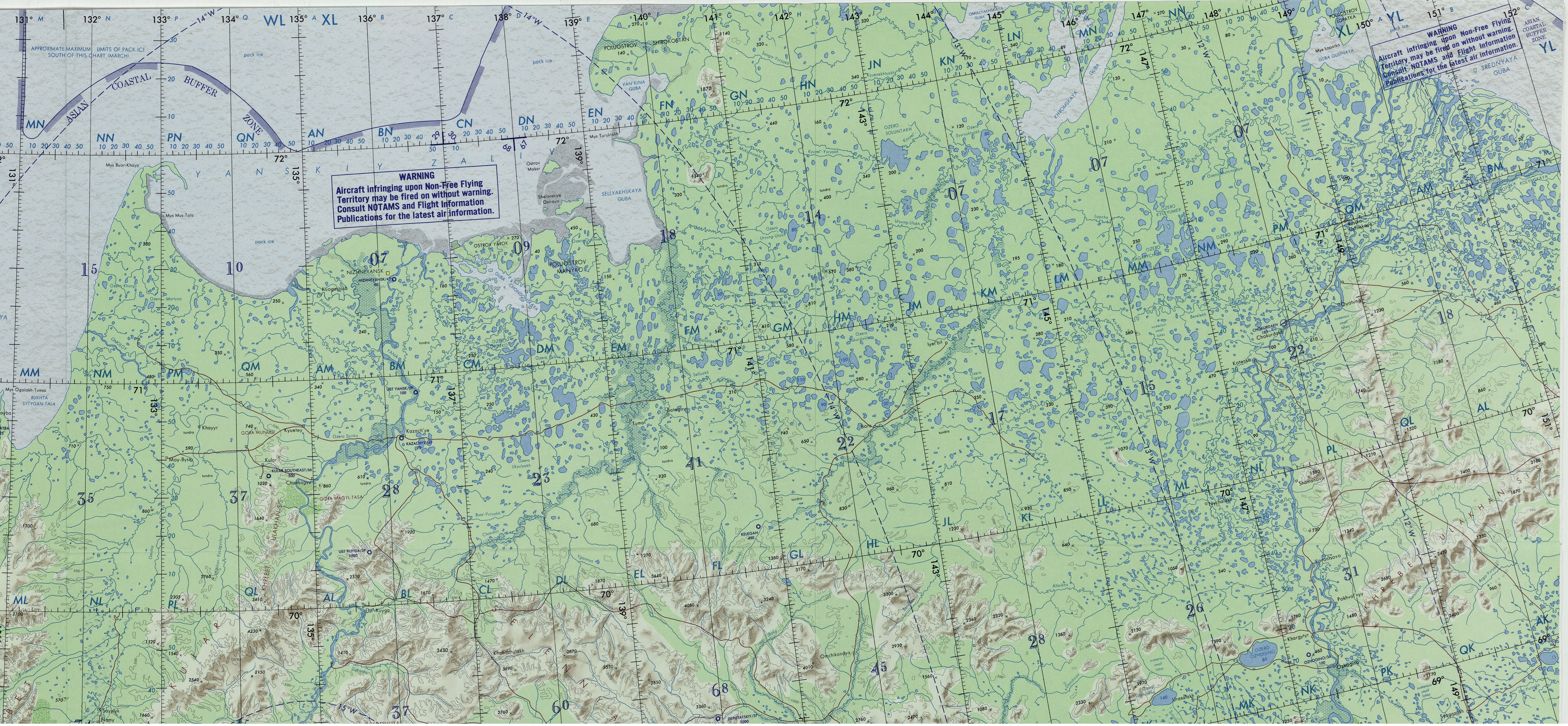
Yana-Indigirka Lowland map section

== See also ==
- List of rivers of Russia
