= Leykina Island =

Leykina Остров Лейкина
- Island
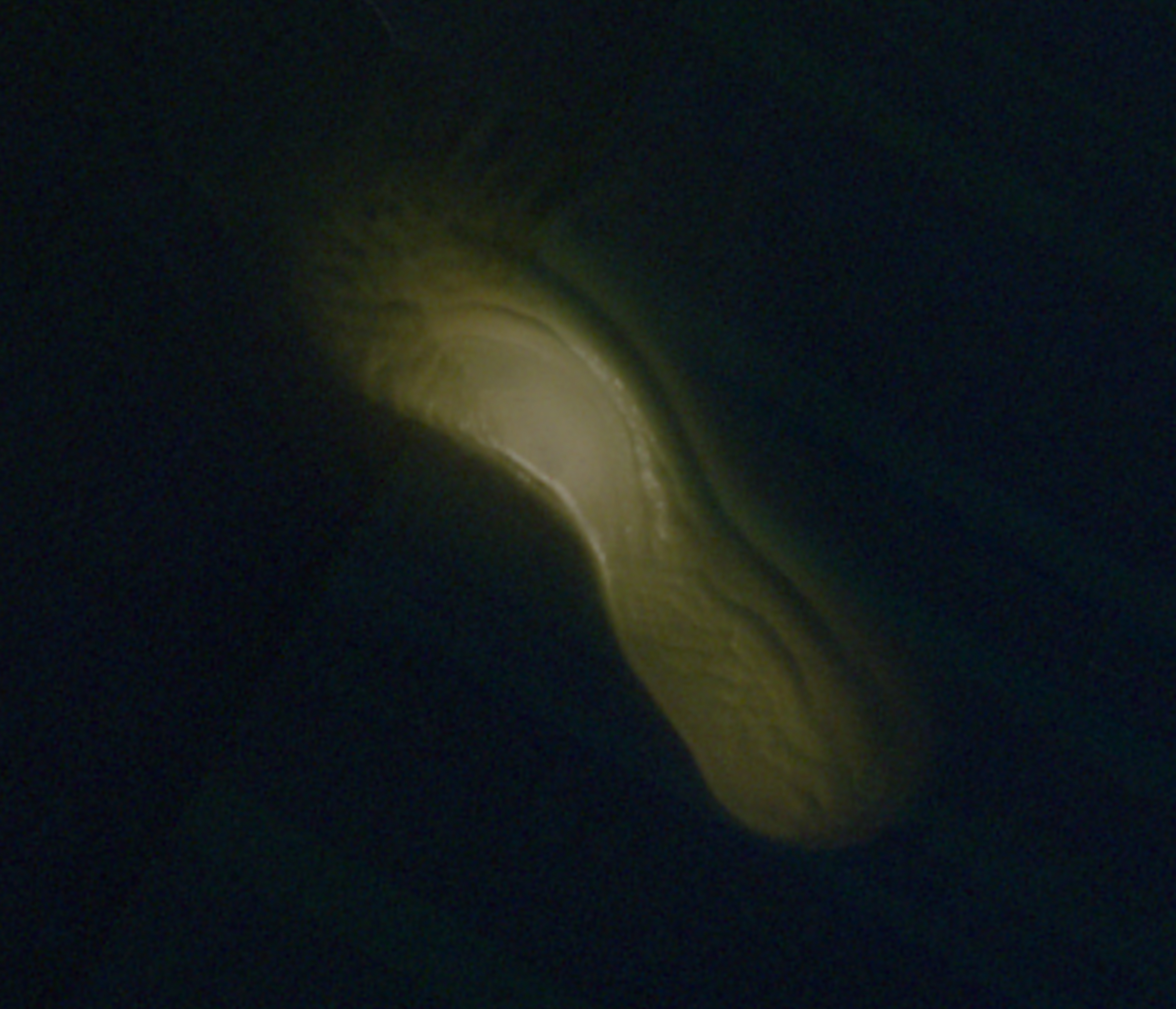
- 8 August 2025

- Location within Sakha Republic
- Coordinates: 74.06669°N 120.44968°E
- Country: Russian Federation
- Federal subject: Far Eastern Federal District
- Republic: Sakha Republic

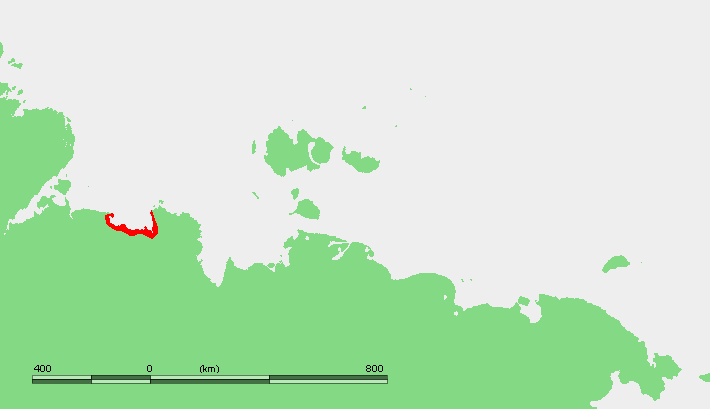
Map showing the Olenyok Gulf. Leykina was located right off its northern boundary.

Leykina Island (Russian: Ostrov Leykina; the English name is a literal transliteration. The accurate name would be Leykin's Island or Leykin Island), formerly Ostrov Osushnoy, is an island in the Laptev Sea. It is located off the Olenyok Gulf, roughly midway between Peschanyy Island and the Dunay Islands, 80 km from Terpyay-Tumsa Cape.

== Geography ==
Although Leykina Island appears in Russian maps (Russian Hydrographic Office chart no 11142), it is not listed in the British Admiralty sailing directions. The Admiralty pilot describes the charted location of the island as ‘doubtful’.

A British yachtsman visiting the area recently failed to find Leykina Island, being able to discern only: "...A ring of small breakers clearly demarcated what I took to be the 5-metre contour line as the seabed shoaled towards where the island should be."

== Administration ==
For administrative purposes Leykina Island belongs to the Sakha (Yakutia) Republic of the Russian Federation.
