= Kolyma Bay =

Gulf of the East Siberian Sea

- Колымская Губа (Russian)
- Map showing the location of the bay

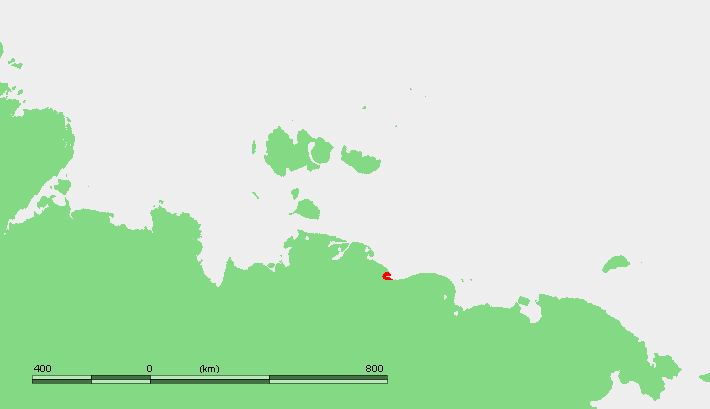
- Location: Far North
- Coordinates: 71°00′N 153°00′E
- River sources: Indigirka River, Sundrun River
- Ocean/sea sources: East Siberian Sea
- Basin countries: Russia

The Kolyma Bay (Russian: Колымская Губа; Kolymskaya Guba) is one of the main gulfs of the East Siberian Sea.

The bay gets its name from the Kolyma Lowlands, whose coastline forms the whole eastern half of this bay. The Kolyma Lowlands are dotted with numerous lakes and swamps. The sea in this bay is frozen for over nine months every year and is often clogged with ice floes.

== Geography ==
Kolesovsky Island and Kolesovskaya Otmel are located close to the shore in the central part of the Kolyma Bay. Further west, the Indigirka River flows into the sea on the western side of the Kolyma Bay, forming a large river delta. The Sundrun River has its mouth at the northwestern limit of the bay.

The Kolyma Bay should not be confused with the larger Kolyma Gulf further east. Administratively the Kolyma Bay belongs to the Sakha Republic (Yakutia) of the Russian Federation.
