= Kolesovsky Island =

Island in the East Siberian Sea, Russia

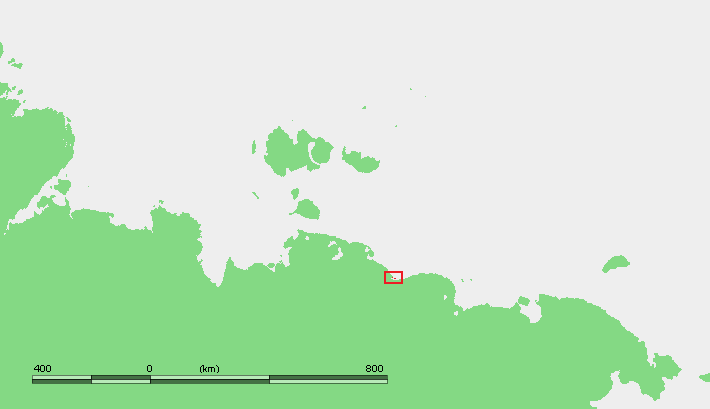
Location of the Kolesovsky Island.

Kolesovsky Island (Russian: Колесовский) is an island in the East Siberian Sea. It is located close to the coast in Kolyma Bay (Kolymskaya Guba), south of the Konechnaya Channel and 13 km east of the mouths of the Indigirka River.

Kolesovsky Island is 3 km long. This island is only 0.7 km across and it is located 4 km to the northwest of Kolesovskaya Otmel, very close to a coastal headland.

Kolyma Bay, where the Kolesovsky Island lies, is a desolate place in the long winters, when it remains frozen to depths of several metres for about 250 days each year. It becomes free of ice only in early June and the thaw lasts typically until October. The area surrounding Kolesovsky Island comes to life during the summer when there is commercial fishing in the surrounding waters.

Administratively Kolesovsky Island belongs to the Sakha Republic (Yakutia) of the Russian Federation. This island is named after Kolesovo 70°54′00″N 151°49′59″E, the nearest town.
