= Leykin =

Jewish surname

Leykin, Leikin, Lejkin, Leykind (feminine: Leykina, Leikina) are surnames of Ashkenazi Jewish origin. It is a Slavic-language-infliuenced matronymic surname derived from the Yiddish diminutive form "Leyka" of the given name Leah. Notable people with this surname include:

- Boris Leykin, the namesake of the Leykina Island, Russia
- Jakub Lejkin (1906-1942), Polish Jewish lawyer, Nazi collaborator, deputy commander of Warsaw Ghetto
- Leonid Leykin (born 1961), Russian clown, actor, and film director
- Lindsay Sloane Leikin-Rollins (born 1977), American actress
- Nikolai Leykin (1841 – 1906), Russian writer, artist, playwright, journalist and publisher
- Polina Leykina (born 1994), Russian tennis player
- Vyacheslav Leikin (born 1937) Russian poet and playwright
