= Time in Sakha =

Time zones in Sakha from 26 October 2014.: Yakutsk Time / UTC+09:00 / (MSK+6); Vladivostok Time / UTC+10:00 / (MSK+7); Magadan Time / UTC+11:00 / (MSK+8)

The Republic of Sakha is the only federal subject of Russia which uses more than one time zone. Sakha spans three time zones.

Map	Time zone	Abbr.	UTC offset	Areas
	Yakutsk Time	YAKT	UTC+09:00	Most of the republic's territory.
	Vladivostok Time	VLAT	UTC+10:00	Districts of Oymyakonsky, Ust-Yansky and Verkhoyansky.
	Magadan Time	MAGT	UTC+11:00	Districts of Abyysky, Allaikhovsky, Momsky, Nizhnekolymsky, Srednekolymsky and Verkhnekolymsky.

== History ==
Time zones in Sakha before September 2011.: / standard / DST; Yakutsk Time / UTC+09:00 / UTC+10:00 / (MSK+6); Vladivostok Time / UTC+10:00 / UTC+11:00 / (MSK+7); Magadan Time / UTC+11:00 / UTC+12:00 / (MSK+8)

Decree No. 725 of 31 August 2011 changed Moscow Time (MSK) from UTC+03:00, or UTC+04:00 with seasonal daylight saving time (DST), to UTC+04:00 all year. Therefore, the time zones of Sakha, which were MSK+6, MSK+7 and MSK+8, changed from UTC+09:00, UTC+10:00 and UTC+11:00 (or UTC+10:00, UTC+11:00 and UTC+12:00 during DST) to UTC+10:00, UTC+11:00 and UTC+12:00 all year. As the decree took effect when DST was already observed, there was no change in local time in most of Sakha. However, the decree also changed the offset of some parts of Sakha with respect to Moscow Time (MSK), and thus to UTC.

Time zone changes in Sakha in September 2011
Areas	Before			After	
Areas	MSK offset	UTC offset		MSK offset	UTC offset
Areas	all year	standard	DST	all year	
Oymyakonsky District	MSK+8	UTC+11:00	UTC+12:00	MSK+7	UTC+11:00
New Siberian Islands; Tomponsky District; Ust-Maysky District	MSK+7	UTC+10:00	UTC+11:00	MSK+6	UTC+10:00

On 26 October 2014, Moscow Time reverted to UTC+03:00, also without seasonal changes. The time offset in all parts of Sakha with respect to Moscow Time remained the same (MSK+6, MSK+7, MSK+8), but changed with respect to UTC (becoming again UTC+09:00, UTC+10:00, UTC+11:00).

== IANA time zone database ==
Country	Coordinates	Time zone name	IANA description	UTC offset	Districts
RU	+6200+12940	Asia/Yakutsk	MSK+06 – Lena River	+09:00	
RU	+623923+1353314	Asia/Khandyga	MSK+06 – Tomponsky, Ust-Maysky	+09:00	Tomponsky, Ust-Maysky
RU	+4310+13156	Asia/Vladivostok	MSK+07 – Amur River	+10:00	Ust-Yansky, Verkhoyansky
RU	+643337+1431336	Asia/Ust-Nera	MSK+07 – Oymyakonsky	+10:00	Oymyakonsky
RU	+6728+15343	Asia/Srednekolymsk	MSK+08 – Sakha (E), N Kuril Is	+11:00	
