= Kolesovskaya Otmel =

Island in the East Siberian Sea

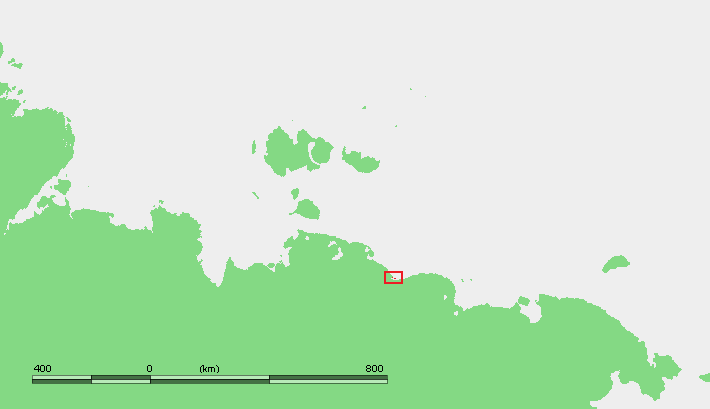
Location of the Kolesovskaya Otmel.

Kolesovskaya Otmel is an island in the East Siberian Sea. It is located close to the coast in the Kolyma Bay (Kolymskaya Guba), south of the Konechnaya Channel and 13 km east of the mouths of the Indigirka River. 6.3 km in length and 1.4 km across. In satellite pictures it appears as two separate islands, a large one at the northern end and a small one at the southern tip. Probably most of the island's surface is a large sandbank that changes shape seasonally.

The Kolyma Bay where the Kolesovskaya Otmel lie is a desolate place in the long winters, when it remains frozen to depths of several metres for about 250 days each year. It becomes free of ice only in early June and the thaw lasts typically until October. The area surrounding the Kolesovskaya Otmel comes to life during the summer when there is commercial fishing in the surrounding waters.

Administratively the Kolesovskaya Otmel belongs to the Sakha Republic (Yakutia) of the Russian Federation. This island is named after Kolesovo 70°54′00″N 151°49′59″E, the nearest village.
