= Dunay Islands =

Group of islands in the Laptev Sea

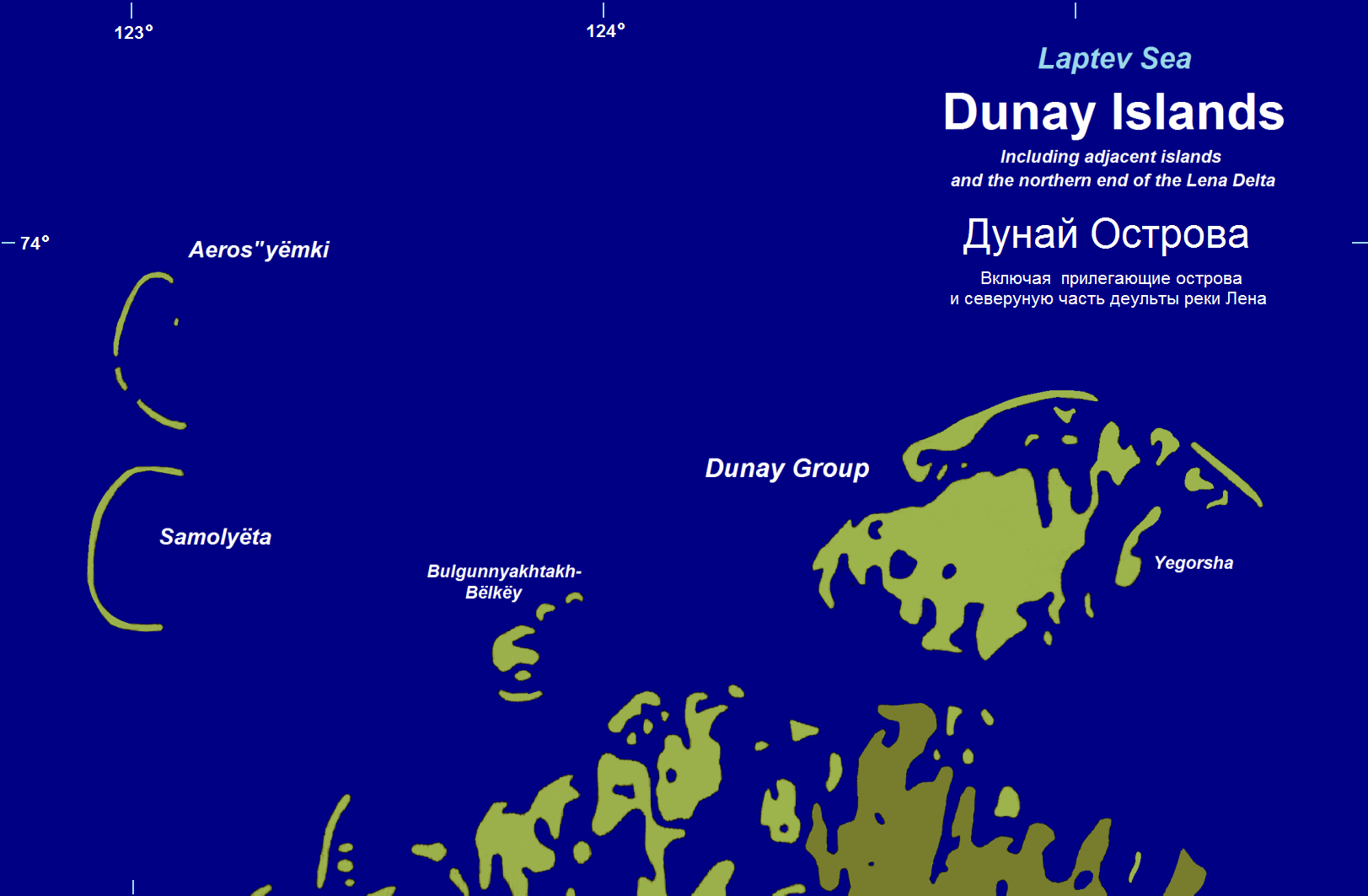
- The Dunay group and adjacent islands

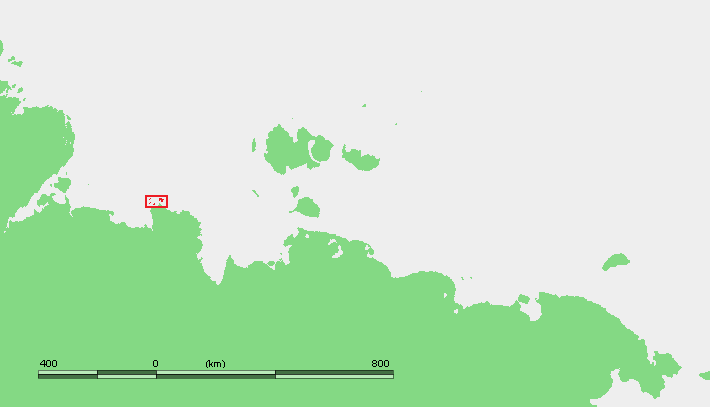

Geography
- Location: Laptev Sea
- Coordinates: 73°51′N 124°31′E
- Archipelago: Dunay Islands
- Total islands: 15

Administration
- Russia
- Republic: Sakha

The Dunay Islands, or Duunay Aryta, (Russian: Острова Дунай) is a group of islands in the Laptev Sea. They are located close to the mouths of the Lena River, off the northwestern shores of the Lena Delta.

== Geography ==
The Dunay islands form a compact cluster; their shores are very irregular with narrow beach ridges, sand bars and swales. The maximum length of the main island is 16 km and its maximum breadth 8 km. The island in the SE is named "Ostrov Yegorsha".

The strait between these islands and the Lena Delta shore is known as Proliv Dzhiyelligestyakh-Oburuosa.

The area where these islands lie is subject to severe Arctic weather. Although there are some offshore polynyas towards the north, there is fast ice between the Dunay Islands and the Lena Delta for about nine months every year.

There is a meteorological station in the islands called Dunay. It had some importance during the golden years of the Northern Sea Route. Administratively these islands belong to the Sakha Republic of the Russian Federation

=== Adjacent islands ===
- 15 km to the WSW of Dunay lie the Bulgunnyakhtakh-Byolkyoy Islands (Ostrova Bulgunnyakhtakh-Bëlkëy). These are five small islands in a chain 73.834°N 123.811°E. The largest one is only 4 km in length. Although located farther offshore, they are a continuation of the Lena delta islands.
- 33 km to the west of Dunay's westernmost tip lie two very narrow C-shaped islands. The southern one is called Samolyota Island (Остров Самолёта; Ostrov Samolëta) 73.865°N 123.125°E, and the northern one Aerosyomki Islands (Острова Аэросъёмки; Ostrova Aeros"yomki) 73.957°N 123.17°E. Both these islands are little more than long curved landspits of over 10 km across and less than a few hundred meters wide. Their curve is open towards the east. While Samolyota is a long, continuous landspit, Aerosyomki is broken in no less than three places, forming four separate smaller islands.
