= Peschany Island =

Coordinates: 74°21′N 116°01′E

Peschany Island о́стров Песча́ный
- Island
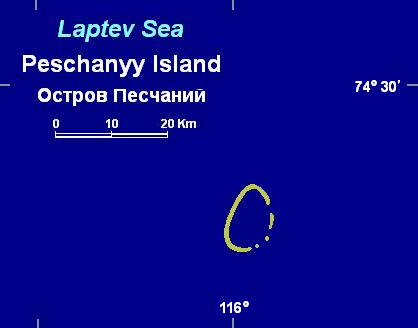
- Map of the island.

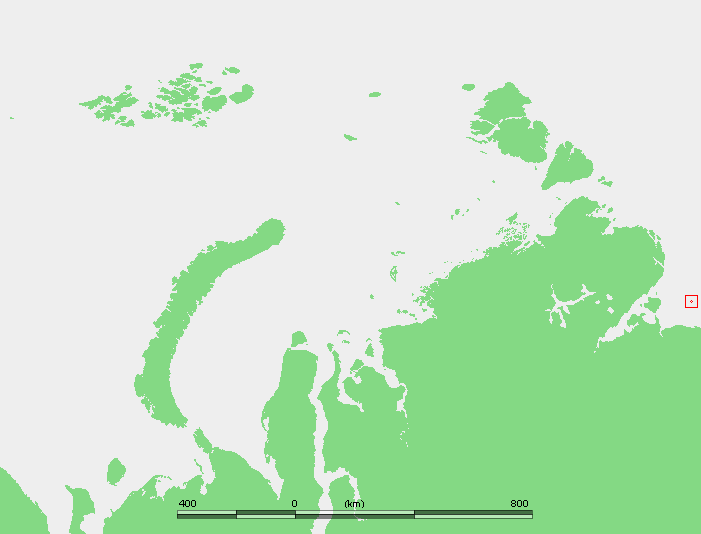
- Location of Peschany Island in the Laptev Sea
- Country: Russian Federation
- Republic: Sakha Republic

Peschany Island (Russian: о́стров Песча́ный; 'Sandy Island'), also known as Ostrov Mel, is an unusually-shaped island in the Laptev Sea.

== Geography ==
Peschany Island consists of a 12 kilometers (7.5 mi)-long elliptical landspit which is broken in its eastern and southeastern side forming three smaller islands. The curved spit encloses a shallow lagoon, making Peschany look like a tropical atoll in the maps. This island is barren and uninhabited.

Peschany is located 74 kilometers (46 mi) to the east of Bolshoy Begichev Island. The Siberian coast lies 62 kilometers (39 mi) to the south.

The sea surrounding Peschany Island is covered with pack ice in the winter. There are large polynias forming on the sea in Peschany Island's vicinity. The climate is marked by severe Arctic weather with frequent gales and low temperatures even in the short summer season which lasts barely two months.

The island is host to colonies of walruses.

A British yachtsman visiting Peschany Island in 2007 commented on the weather and on the desolation of the place: "I have been anchored off Ostrov Peschany for a week now and during that time have had to move position eight times. There is, as a rule of thumb, a gale per day lasting between 8 and 12 hours... Ostrov Peschany must be one of the bleakest and least inviting islands anywhere in the world."

== Administration ==
The island is administered by the Sakha Republic of Russia.
