= Sakha Republic =

Administrative division of eastern Russia

Republic of Sakha (Yakutia) Республика Саха (Якутия) (Russian)
- Republic

Other transcription(s)
  - Yakut: Саха Өрөспүүбүлүкэтэ
  - Romanisation: Saxa Öröspüübülükete
- Flag Coat of arms
- Anthem: State Anthem of the Sakha Republic
- Coordinates: 66°24′N 129°10′E
- Country: Russia
- Federal district: Far Eastern
- Economic region: Far Eastern
- Established: 27 April 1922
- Capital: Yakutsk

Government
  - Body: State Assembly (Il Tumen)
  - Head: Aysen Nikolayev

Area
  - Total: 3,083,523 km^{2} (1,190,555 sq mi)
  - Rank: 1st
- Elevation: 3,003 m (9,852 ft)

Population (2021 census)
  - Total: 995,686: 55.3% Sakha; 32.6% Russians; 2.9% Evenks; 1.6% Evens; 1.3% Kyrgyz; 0.8% Ukrainians; 0.8% Buryats; 0.7% Tajiks; 5.8% other
  - Estimate (2018): 964,330
  - Rank: 50th
  - Density: 0.322905/km^{2} (0.836321/sq mi)
  - Urban: 66.8%
  - Rural: 33.2%

GDP (nominal, 2024)
  - Total: ₽2.23 trillion (US$26.17 billion)
  - Per capita: ₽2.23 million (US$26,175.22)

Time zones
- most (excluding districts in UTC+10:00 and UTC+11:00 time zones): UTC+9 (Yakutsk Time)
- Oymyakonsky, Ust-Yansky and Verkhoyansky districts: UTC+10:00 (Vladivostok Time)
- Abyysky, Allaikhovsky, Momsky, Nizhnekolymsky, Srednekolymsky and Verkhnekolymsky districts: UTC+11:00 (Magadan Time)
- ISO 3166 code: RU-SA
- License plates: 14
- OKTMO ID: 98000000
- Official languages: Russian; Yakut
- Website: sakha.gov.ru

Interactive map of the Sakha Republic

Sakha, (Note: Russian: Якутия, romanized: Yakutiya, IPA: [jɪˈkutʲɪjə]; Yakut: Саха Сирэ, romanized: Saxa Sire, IPA: [saˈxa sire]) officially the Republic of Sakha (Yakutia), (Note: Russian: Республика Саха (Якутия), romanized: Respublika Sakha (Yakutiya), IPA: [rʲɪsˈpublʲɪkə sɐˈxa jɪˈkutʲɪjə]; Yakut: Саха Өрөспүүбүлүкэтэ, romanized: Saxa Öröspüübülükete, IPA: [saˈxa øɾøsˈpyːbylykete]) is a republic of Russia, and the largest federal subject of Russia by area. It is located in the Russian Far East, along the Arctic Ocean, with a population of about one million. Sakha comprises half of the area of its governing Far Eastern Federal District, and is the world's largest country subdivision, covering over 3,083,523 square kilometers (1,190,555 sq mi). Yakutsk is the republic's capital and largest city. It is also the world's coldest major city.

The republic has a reputation for an extreme and severe climate, with the second lowest temperatures in the Northern Hemisphere being recorded in Verkhoyansk and Oymyakon (second only to Summit Camp, Greenland), and regular winter averages commonly dipping below −35 °C (−31 °F) in Yakutsk. The hypercontinental tendencies also result in warm summers for much of the republic.

Sakha was first home to hunting-gathering and reindeer-herding Tungusic and Paleosiberian peoples such as the Evenks and Yukaghir. Migrating from the area around Lake Baikal, the Turkic Sakha people first migrated to the middle Lena River sometime between the 9th and 16th centuries, likely in several waves, bringing the pastoral economic system of Inner Asia with them.

The Russians colonised and incorporated the area as the Yakutsk Oblast into the Tsardom of Russia in the early-mid 17th century, obliging the indigenous peoples of the area to pay fur tribute. While the initial period following the Russian conquest saw the Sakha population drop by 70%, the Imperial period also saw the expansion of the native Yakuts from the middle Lena along the Vilyuy River to the north and the east displacing other indigenous groups. Yakutia saw some of the last battles of the Russian Civil War, and the Bolshevik authorities reorganised Yakutsk Oblast into the autonomous Yakut ASSR in 1922. The Soviet era saw the migration of many Slavs, specifically Russians and Ukrainians, into the area.

On 27 September 1990, the area became the Yakutskaya-Sakha Soviet Socialist Republic, and on 27 December 1991, it became the Republic of Sakha (Yakutia).

== Etymology ==
The exonym Yakut comes from the Evenk term Yako (also yoqo, ñoqa, or ñoka), which was the term the Evenks used to describe the Sakha. This was in turn picked up by the Russians. The Yukaghirs, another neighbouring people in Siberia, use the exonym yoqol ~ yoqod- ~ yoqon- (Tundra Yukaghir) or yaqal ~ yaqad- ~ yaqan- (Kolyma Yukaghir).

The self-designation Sakha may be of the same origin (*jaqa > Sakha following regular sound changes in the course of development of the Yakut language) as the Evenk and Yukaghir exonyms for the Yakuts. It is pronounced as Haka by the Dolgans, whose language is a close relative of the Yakut language.

== Geography ==
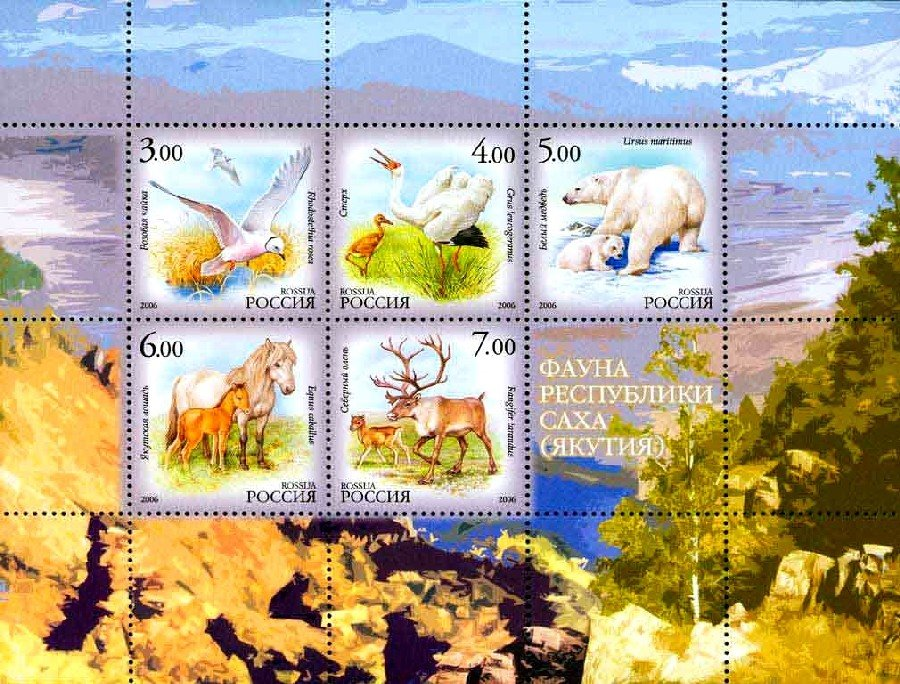
Fauna of the Sakha Republic: Ross's gull, the Siberian crane, polar bear, horse and reindeer. Russian post miniature sheet, 2006.

- Borders:
  - internal: Chukotka Autonomous Okrug (660 km; 410 mi) (East and Northeast), Magadan Oblast (1,520 km; 940 mi) (East), Khabarovsk Krai (2,130 km; 1,320 mi) (Southeast), Amur Oblast (South), Zabaykalsky Krai (South), Irkutsk Oblast (South and Southwest), Krasnoyarsk Krai (West).
  - water: Arctic Ocean (including Laptev Sea and Eastern Siberian Sea) (North).
- Highest point: Peak Pobeda (3,003 m; 9,852 ft)
- Maximum N–S distance: 2,500 km (1,600 mi)
- Maximum E–W distance: 2,000 km (1,200 mi)

Sakha stretches to the Henrietta Island in the far north and is washed by the Laptev and Eastern Siberian Seas of the Arctic Ocean. These waters, the coldest and iciest of all seas in the Northern Hemisphere, are covered by ice for 9–10 months of the year. New Siberian Islands are a part of the republic's territory. After Nunavut was separated from Canada's Northwest Territories in 1999, Sakha became the largest subnational entity (statoid) in the world, with an area of 3,083,523 square kilometers (1,190,555 sq mi), slightly smaller than the territory of India (3.3 million km^{2}; 1.3 million sq mi), but still slightly larger than Argentina.

Sakha can be divided into three great vegetation belts. About 40% of Sakha lies above the Arctic Circle and all of it is covered by permafrost which greatly influences the region's ecology and limits forests in the southern region. Arctic and subarctic tundra define the middle region, where lichen and moss grow as great green carpets and are favourite pastures for reindeer. In the southern part of the tundra belt, scattered stands of dwarf Siberian pine and larch grow along the rivers. Below the tundra is the vast taiga forest region. Larch trees dominate in the north and stands of fir and pine begin to appear in the south. Taiga forests cover about 47% of Sakha and almost 90% of the cover is larch.

The Sakha Republic is the site of Pleistocene Park, a project directed at recreating Pleistocene tundra grasslands by stimulating the growth of grass with the introduction of animals which thrived in the region during the late Pleistocene – early Holocene period.

=== Time zones ===
Time zones in Sakha: Yakutsk Time / UTC+09:00; Vladivostok Time / UTC+10:00; Magadan Time / UTC+11:00

Sakha is the only federal subject of Russia which uses more than one time zone. Sakha spans three time zones. Like the rest of Russia, it does not use daylight saving time.

Map	Time zone	Abbr.	UTC offset	Areas
	Yakutsk Time	YAKT	UTC+09:00	Most of the republic's territory
	Vladivostok Time	VLAT	UTC+10:00	Districts of Oymyakonsky, Ust-Yansky and Verkhoyansky
	Magadan Time	MAGT	UTC+11:00	Districts of Abyysky, Allaikhovsky, Momsky, Nizhnekolymsky, Srednekolymsky and Verkhnekolymsky

=== Rivers ===
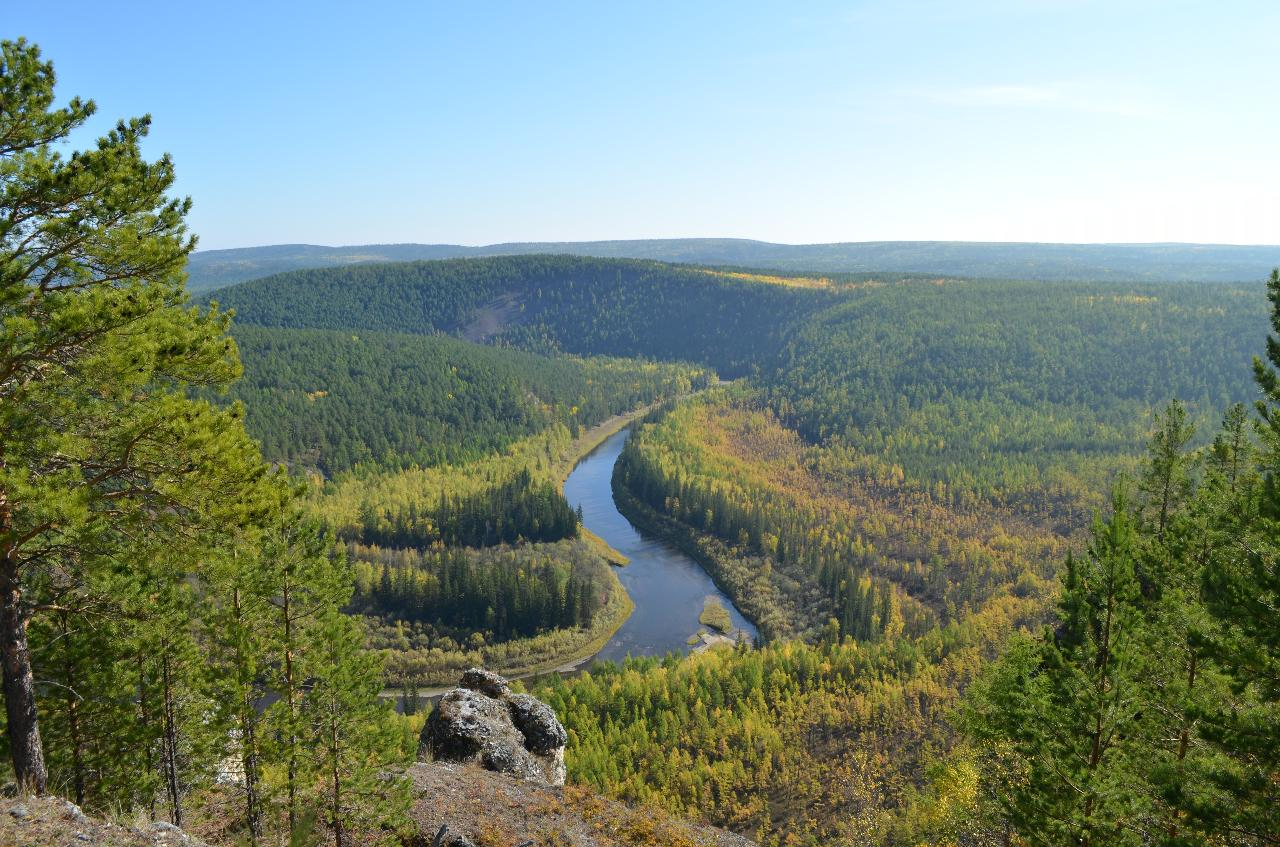
Ura River

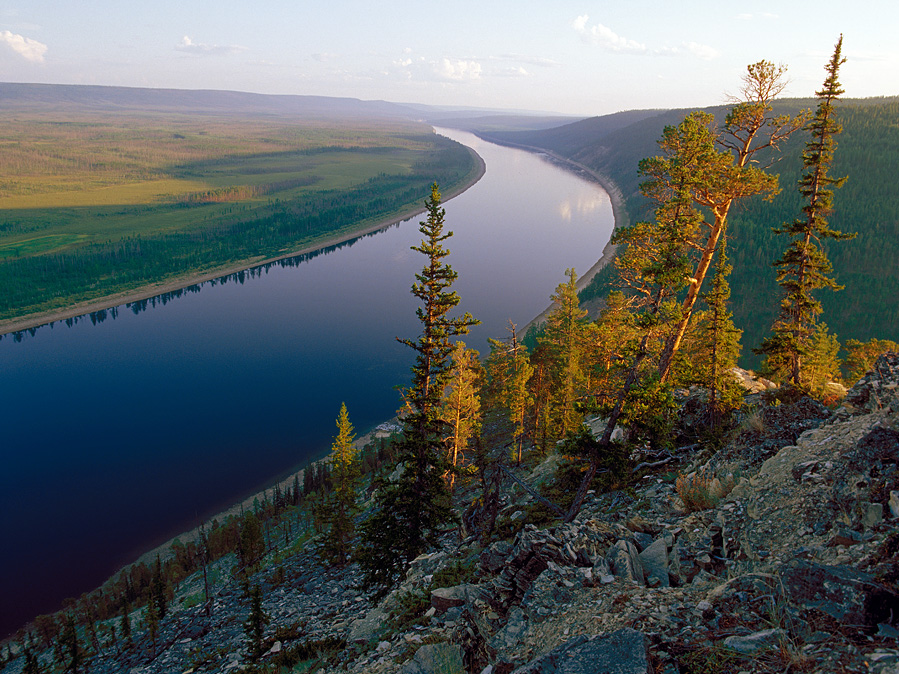
Olyokma River

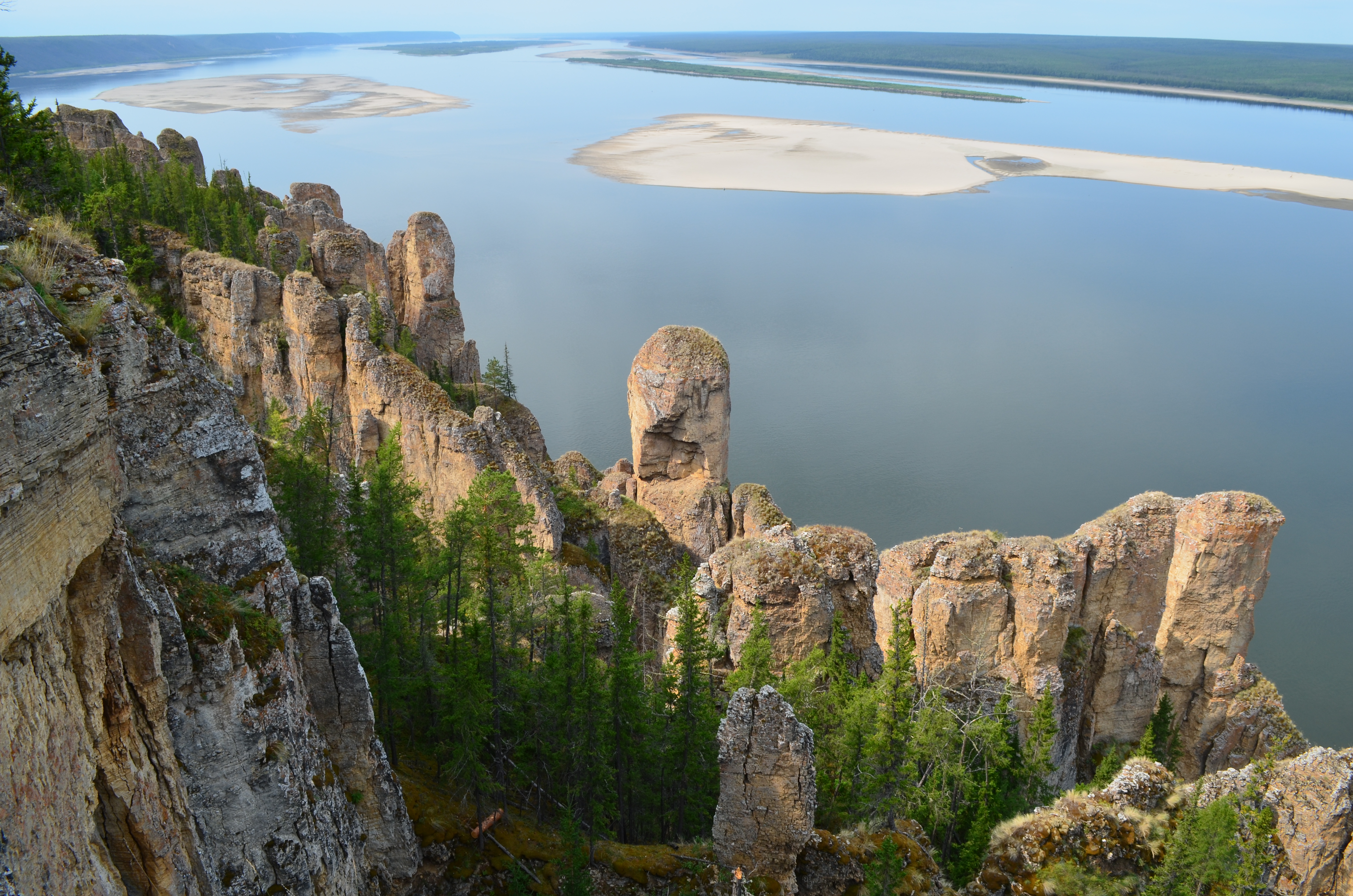
Lena Pillars

The largest river is the navigable Lena River (4,400 km; 2,700 mi). As it moves northward, it includes hundreds of small tributaries located in the Verkhoyansk Range.

- Lena River
  - Vilyuy River (2,650 km; 1,650 mi) Lena River tributary
    - Markha River (1,181 km; 734 mi) Vilyuy River tributary
      - Morkoka River (812 km; 505 mi) Markha River tributary
    - Tyung River (1,092 km; 679 mi) Vilyuy River tributary
  - Aldan River (2,273 km; 1,412 mi) Lena River tributary
    - Amga River (1,462 km; 908 mi) Aldan River tributary
    - Maya River (1,053 km; 654 mi) Aldan River tributary
    - Uchur River (812 km; 505 mi) Aldan River tributary
  - Olyokma River (1,320 km; 820 mi) Lena River tributary
  - Linde River (804 km; 500 mi) Lena River tributary
  - Nyuya River (798 km; 496 mi) Lena River tributary
- Olenyok River (2,292 km; 1,424 mi)
- Kolyma River (2,129 km; 1,323 mi)
- Indigirka River (1,726 km; 1,072 mi)
  - Selennyakh River (796 km; 495 mi) Indigirka River tributary
- Alazeya River (1,590 km; 990 mi)
- Anabar River (939 km; 583 mi)
- Yana River (872 km; 542 mi)
  - Adycha River (715 km; 444 mi) Yana River tributary
  - Oldzho River (330 km; 210 mi) Yana River tributary
  - Bytantay River (620 km; 390 mi) Yana River tributary

=== Lakes ===
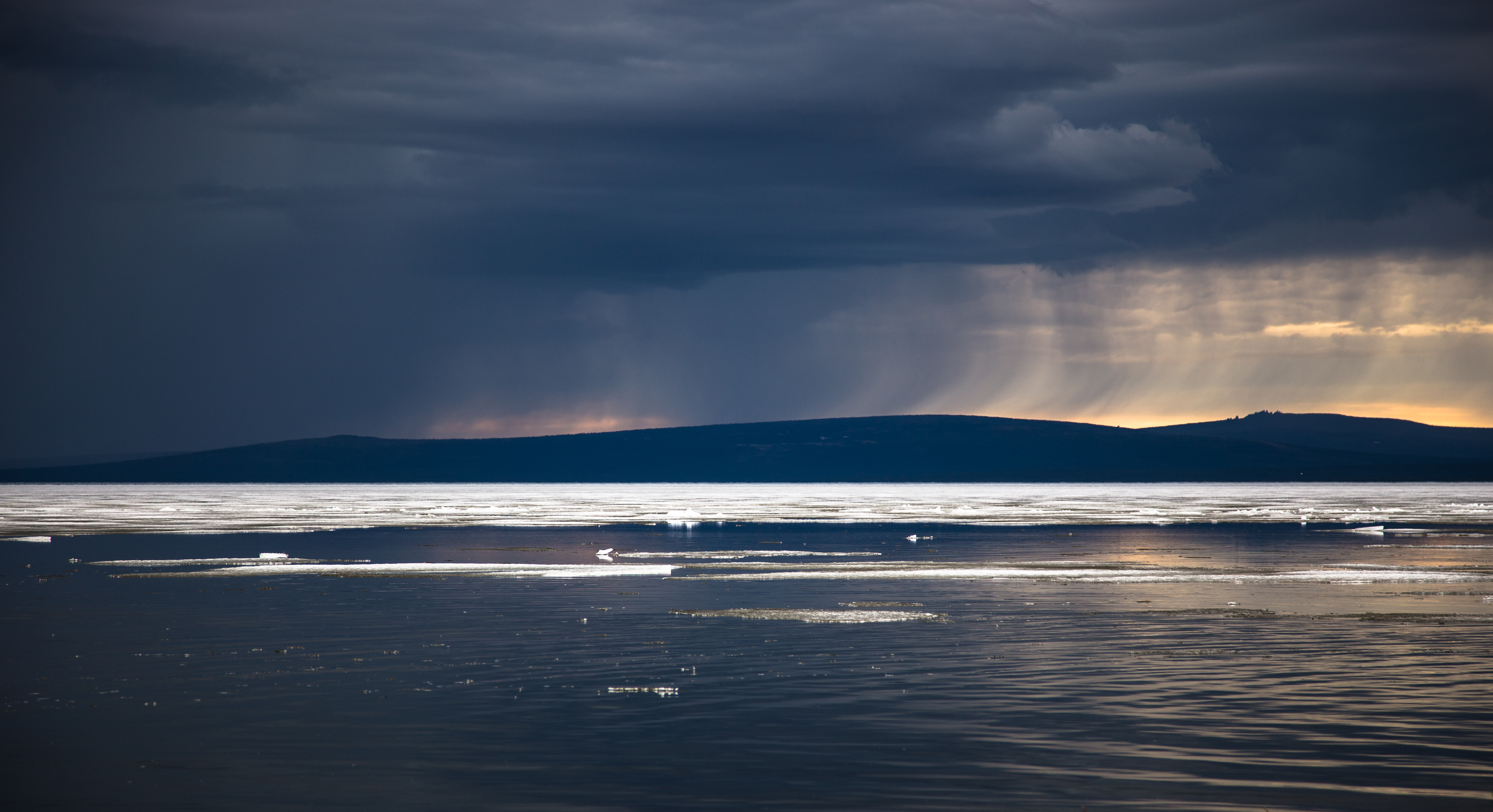
Lake Ozhogino

There are over 800,000 lakes in the republic. Major lakes and reservoirs include:

- Lake Bolshoye Morskoye
- Lake Bustakh
- Emanda
- Lake Mogotoyevo
- Nedzheli
- Lake Nerpichye
- Lake Ozhogino
- Lake Suturuokha
- Tabanda
- Ulakhan-Kyuel
- Vilyuy Reservoir

=== Mountains ===
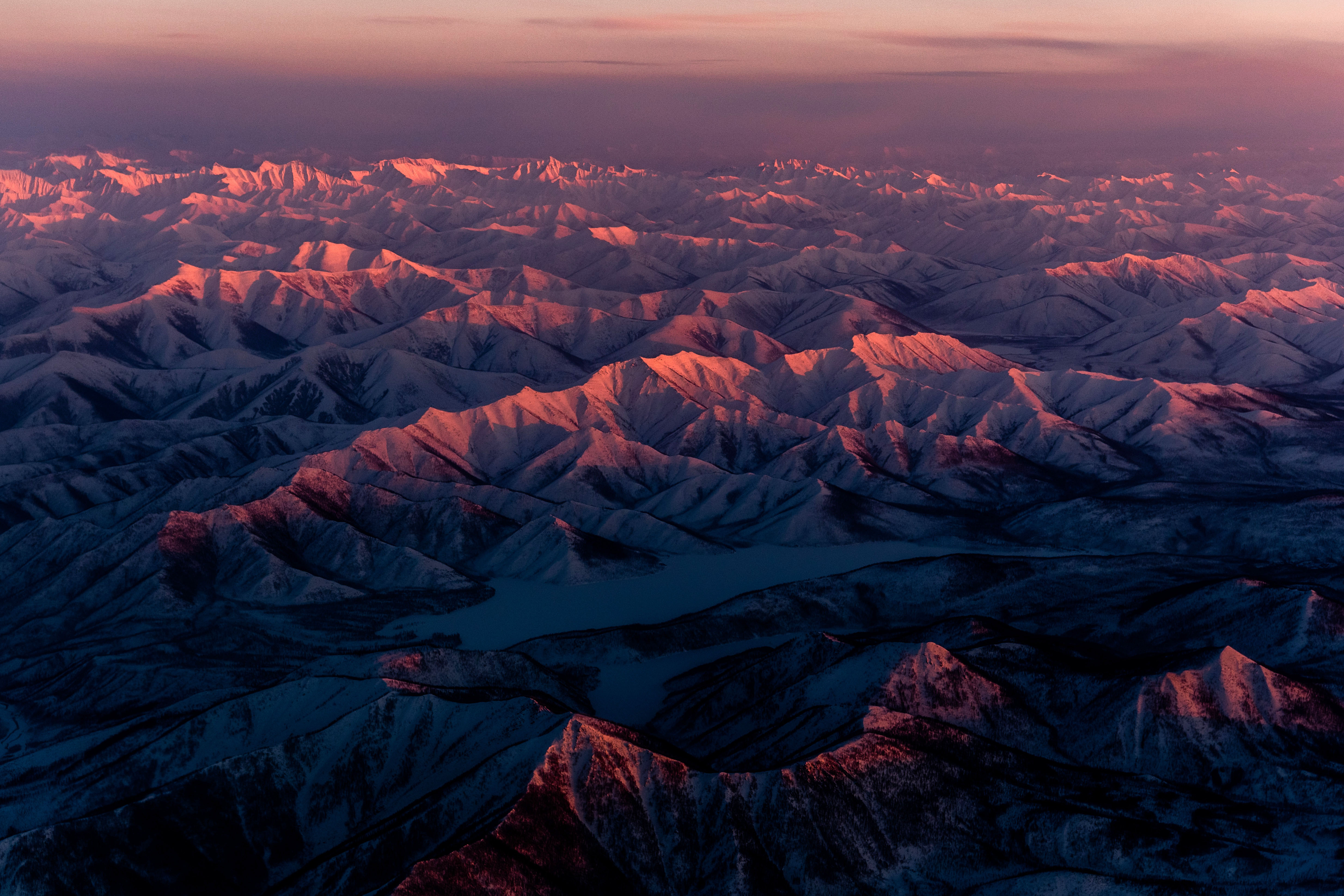
Verkhoyansk Range

Sakha's greatest mountain range, the Verkhoyansk Range, runs parallel and east of the Lena River, forming a great arc that begins in the Sea of Okhotsk and ends in the Laptev Sea.

The Chersky Range runs east of the Verkhoyansk Range and has the highest peak in Sakha, Peak Pobeda (3,003 meters or 9,852 feet). The second highest peak is Peak Mus-Khaya reaching 2,959 meters (9,708 ft).

The Stanovoy Range borders Sakha in the south.

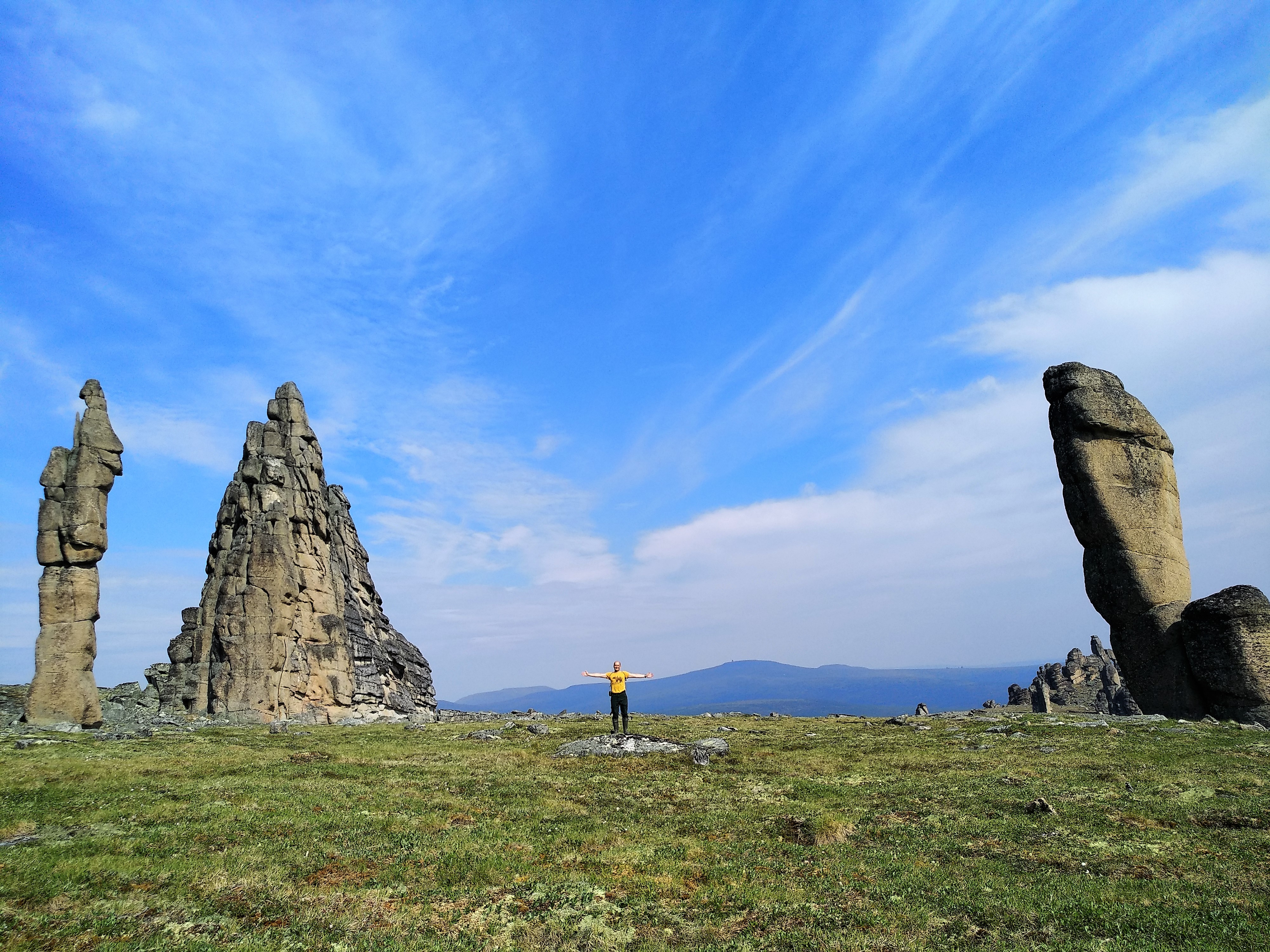
Ulakhan-Sis Range famous for its unusual kigilyakh rock formations

=== Peninsulas ===
The Republic's extensive coastline contains a number of peninsulas; from west to east the most prominent are:

- Uryung-Tumus Peninsula
- Nordvik Peninsula
- Terpyay-Tumsa Peninsula
- Bykovsky Peninsula
- Buor-Khaya Peninsula
- Manyko Peninsula
- Shirokostan Peninsula
- Merkushina Strelka Peninsula
- Lopatka Peninsula
- Dogukan Peninsula

=== Islands ===
From west to east, the main islands of Sakha are:

- Preobrazheniya Island
- Bolshoy Begichev Island
- Maliy Begichev Island
- Peschany Island
- Salkay Island
- Orto Ary
- Daldalakh
- Dyangylakh Island
- Dunay Islands
- Leykina Island
- Islands of the Lena Delta
- Brusneva Island
- Muostakh Island
- Ulakhan Ary Island
- Yarok Island
- Shelonsky Islands
- Makar Island
- Stolbovoy Island
- New Siberian Islands (by far the largest group)
- De Long Islands
- Medvezhyi Islands
- Kolesovsky Island
- Kolesovskaya Otmel
- Gabyshevskiy Island
- Kamenka Island
- Markhayanovskiy Island
- Gusmp Island
- Sukhanyy Island

=== Natural resources ===
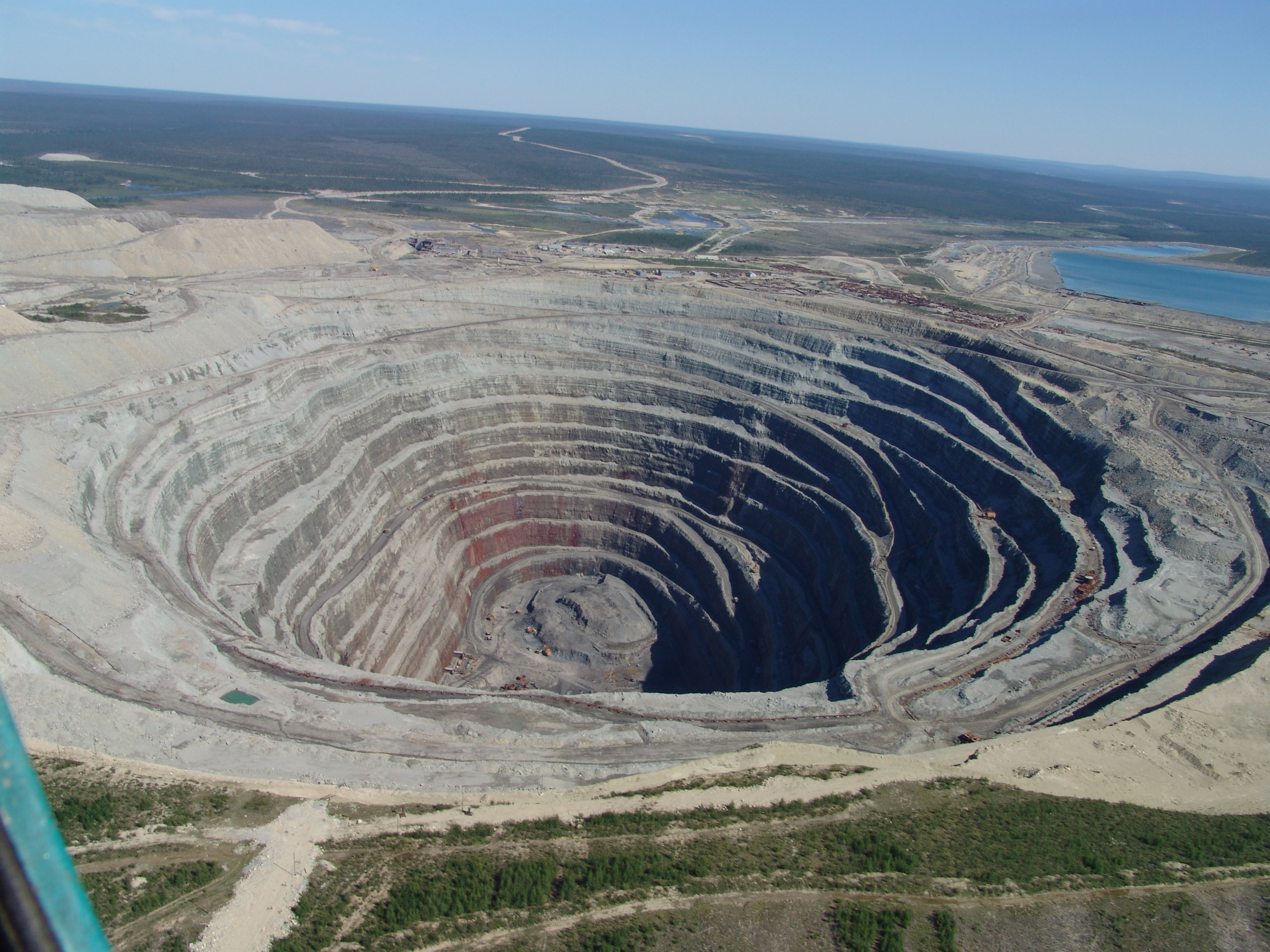
Udachnaya pipe diamond mine

Sakha is well endowed with raw materials. The soil contains large reserves of oil, gas, coal, diamonds, gold, silver, tin, tungsten and many others. Sakha produces 99% of all Russian diamonds and over 25% of the diamonds mined in the world.

=== Climate ===
Sakha is known for its extremes in climate, with the Verkhoyansk Range being the coldest area in the Northern Hemisphere. Some of the lowest natural temperatures ever recorded have been here. The Northern Hemisphere's Pole of Cold is at Verkhoyansk, where the temperatures reached as low as −67.8 °C (−90.0 °F) in 1892 and 1885, and at Oymyakon, where the temperatures reached as low as −67.8 °C (−90.0 °F) in February 1934.

Average daily maximum and minimum temperatures for selected locations in Yakutiya
City	July (°C)	July (°F)	January (°C)	January (°F)
Aldan	23.0/11.1	73.4/52.0	−21.3/−30.1	−6.3/−22.2
Neryungri	22.3/11.2	72.1/52.2	−26.2/−33.2	−15.2/−27.8
Olyokminsk	25.1/12.2	77.2/54.0	−26.0/−33.9	−14.8/−29.0
Oymyakon	23.0/6.9	73.4/44.4	−42.1/−49.3	−43.8/−56.7
Verkhoyansk	23.4/10.0	74.1/50.0	−41.6/−47.7	−42.9/−53.9
Yakutsk	25.8/13.1	78.4/55.6	−34.0/−39.8	−29.2/−39.6
Saskylakh	16.8/7.5	62.2/45.5	−30.1/−37.5	−22.2/−35.5
Tiksi	12.7/4.7	54.9/40.5	−25.9/−33.1	−14.6/−27.6

Average annual precipitation: 200 mm (7.9 in) (central parts) to 700 mm (28 in) (mountains of Eastern Sakha).

== History ==
=== Prehistory ===
Siberia, and particularly Sakha, is of paleontological significance, as it contains bodies of prehistoric animals from the Pleistocene Epoch, preserved in ice or permafrost. In 2015, the frozen bodies of Dina and Uyan the cave lion cubs were found. Bodies of Yuka and another woolly mammoth from Oymyakon, a woolly rhinoceros from the Kolyma River, and bison and horses from Yukagir have also been discovered. In June 2019, the severed but preserved head of a large wolf from the Pleistocene, dated to over 40,000 years ago, was found close to the Tirekhtyakh River.

Ymyakhtakh culture (c. 2200–1300 BC) was a Late Neolithic culture of Siberia, with a very large archaeological horizon. Its origins were in Sakha, in the Lena River basin. From there it spread both to the east and to the west.

=== Early history ===
The Turkic Sakha people or Yakuts may have settled the area as early as the 9th century or as late as the 16th century, though most likely there were several migrations. They migrated northward from around Lake Baikal to the middle Lena due to pressure by the Buryats, a Mongolic group.

The Sakha displaced earlier, much smaller populations who lived on hunting and reindeer herding, introducing the pastoralist economy of Central Asia. The indigenous populations of Paleosiberian and Tungusic stock were mostly assimilated into the Sakha by the 17th century.

=== Russian conquest ===
The Tsardom of Russia began its conquest of the region in the 17th century, moving east after the defeat of the Khanate of Sibir. Tygyn, a king of the Khangalassky Sakha, granted territory for Russian settlement in return for a military pact that included war against indigenous rebels of all Northeastern Asia (Magadan, Chukotka, Kamchatka and Sakhalin). Kull, a king of the Megino-Khangalassky Sakha, began a Sakha conspiracy by allowing the first stockade construction.

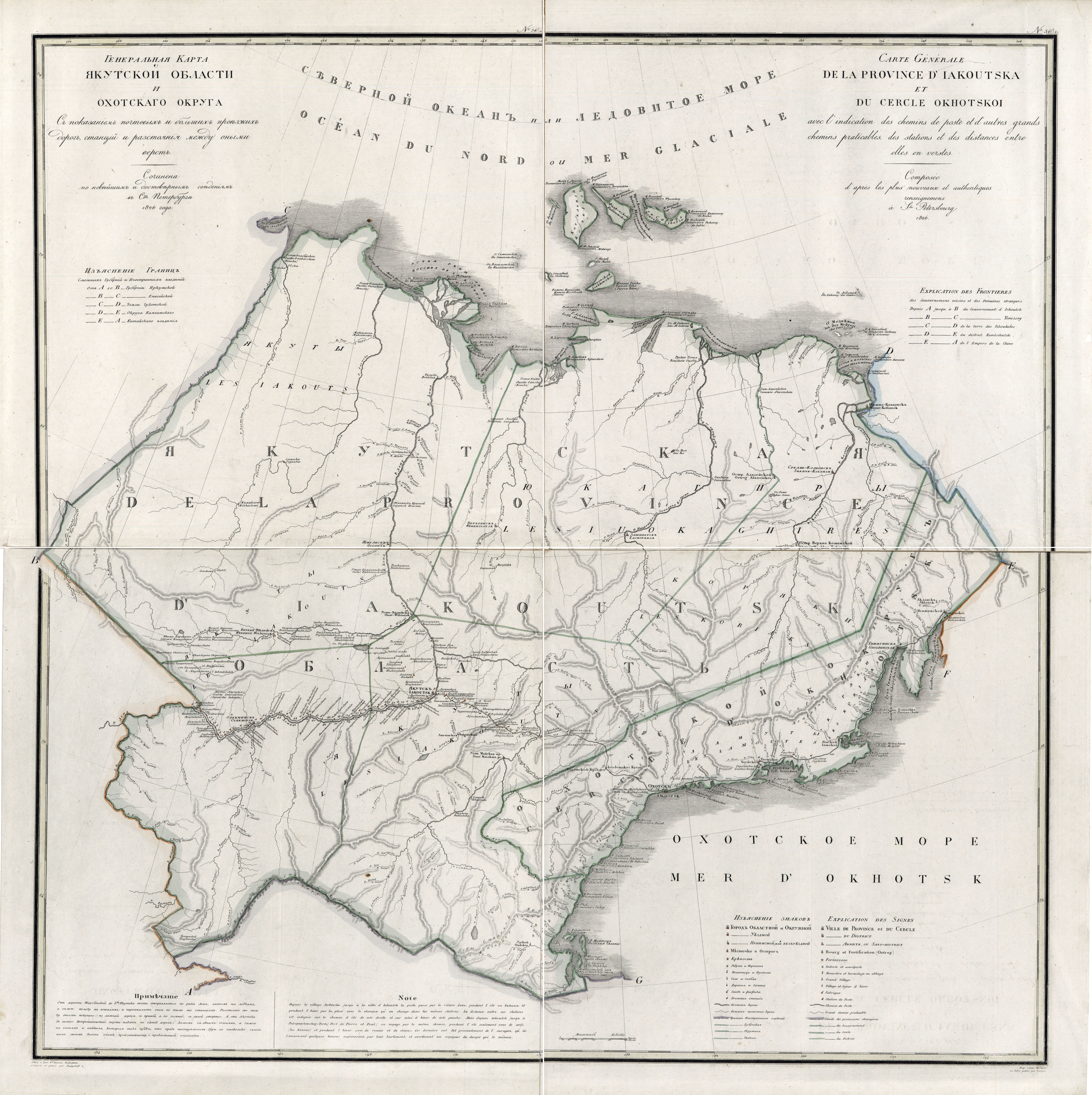
1821 map of Yakutsk Oblast.

In August 1638, the Moscow Government formed a new administrative unit with the administrative center at Lensky Ostrog (Fort Lensky), the future city of Yakutsk, which had been founded by Pyotr Beketov in 1632.

The arrival of Russian settlers at the remote Russkoye Ustye in the Indigirka delta is also believed to date from the 17th century. The Siberian Governorate was established as part of the Russian Empire in 1708.

Russian settlers began to form a community in the 18th century, which adopted certain Sakha customs and was often called Yakutyane (Якутя́не) or Lena Early Settlers (ленские старожилы). However, the influx of later settlers assimilated themselves into the Russian mainstream by the 20th century.

=== Russian Empire ===
In an administrative reform of 1782, Irkutsk Governorate was created. In 1805, Yakutsk Oblast was split from Irkutsk Governorate.

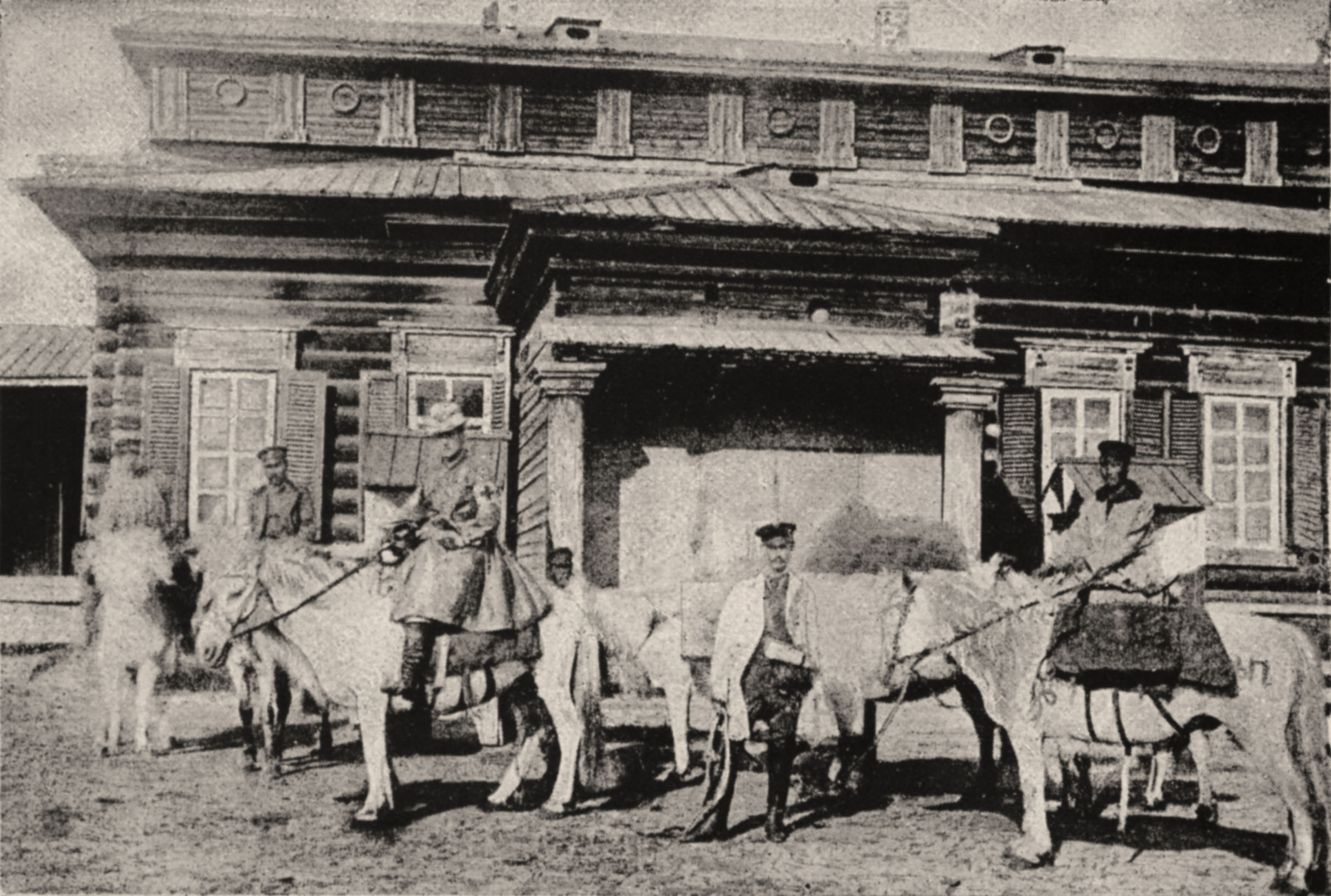
British explorer and missionary Kate Marsden in Yakutsk, 1891

Yakutsk Oblast in the early 19th century marked the easternmost territory of the Russian Empire, including such Far Eastern (Pacific) territories as were acquired, known as Okhotsk Okrug within Yakutsk Oblast. With the formation of Primorskaya Oblast in 1856, the Russian territories of the Pacific were detached from Sakha.

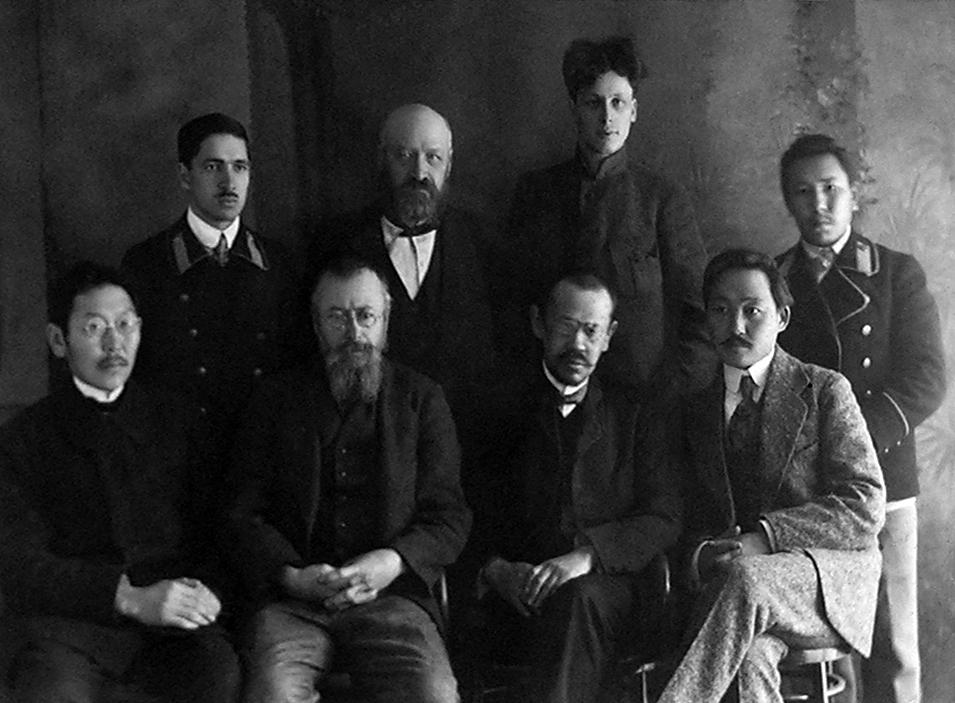
Members of the Siberian Regional Duma from Yakutsk, 1917

The Russians established agriculture in the Lena River basin. The members of religious groups who were exiled to Sakha in the second half of the 19th century began to grow wheat, oats, and potatoes. The fur trade established a cash economy. Industry and transport began to develop at the end of the 19th century and in the beginning of the Soviet period. This was also the beginning of geological prospecting, mining, and local lead production. The first steam-powered ships and barges arrived.

Sakha's remoteness, compared to the rest of Siberia, made it a place of exile of choice for both Tsarist and Communist governments of Russia. Among the famous Tsarist-era exiles were the democratic writer Nikolay Chernyshevsky; Doukhobors, conscientious objectors whose story was told to Leo Tolstoy by Vasily Pozdnyakov; the Socialist Revolutionary Party member and writer Vladimir Zenzinov, who left an account of his Arctic experiences; and Polish socialist activist Wacław Sieroszewski, who pioneered in ethnographic research on the Sakha people.

A Sakha national movement first emerged during the 1905 Revolution. A Yakut Union was formed under the leadership of a Sakha lawyer and city councilor by the name of Vasily Nikiforov, which criticized the policies and effects of Russian colonialism, and demanded representation in the State Duma. The Yakut Union acted to make the city council of Yakutsk stand down and was joined by thousands of Sakha from the countryside, but the leaders were arrested and the movement fizzled out by April 1906. Their demand for a Sakha representative in the Duma, however, was granted.

=== Sakha during the Civil War ===
After the October Revolution, the anti-Bolshevik forces of Sakha created the Committee for the Protection of the Revolution, which supported the idea of convening a Constituent Assembly. On July 1, 1918, the Red Guard detachment of A. S. Rydzinsky occupied Yakutsk. The executive committee of the Soviet of Workers' Deputies was created in the city, headed by M. K. Ammosov. Soviet authorities were also formed in Vilyuysk, in the Nyurbinsky and Suntarsky district, and in other uluses. As a result of the defeat of the White Guard troops in Siberia in late 1919 - early 1920, Soviet power was restored in Sakha.

On April 20, 1920, by the decision of the Sibrevkom, Yakutsk Oblast was included in the Irkutsk province as a special district. On August 21, 1920, by the decision of the same Sibrevkom, Sakha was given the status of a province. In the summer of 1921, Georgy Lebedev was appointed secretary of the Yakut Bureau of the Russian Communist Party (Bolsheviks) by the Siberian Committee, and Alexei Kozlov was appointed chairman of the Revolutionary Tribunal. In Yakut historiography, the period of leadership of Georgy Lebedev, Alexei Kozlov and Anton Ageev is usually called the "triumvirate". The "triumvirate" began to pursue a policy of red terror and ultra-communism in Sakha.

In September 1921, an anti-Soviet uprising broke out in Sakha. On October 6, the White Guard detachment of Valerian Bochkarev captured Okhotsk. By 1922, the uprising had engulfed almost all of Sakha. The rebels turned to the Russian émigré circles in Harbin for help, from where a large White Guard detachment was sent to help them. In March 1922, the rebels created the Provisional Yakut Regional People's Administration in Churapcha. The rebels approached Yakutsk, a state of siege was introduced in the city. A large detachment of Nestor Kalandarishvili arrived to help the Yakut Bolsheviks, but Kalandarishvili himself, along with his group, died in an ambush near Tekhtyur. During the Battle of Everstovaya Zaimka near Tulagino and the Battle of Kildyam, the siege of Yakutsk was lifted.

On March 10, a party meeting headed by Platon Oyunsky accused Lebedev, Kozlov and Ageev of left-wing deviation and serious mistakes that led Sakha to an uprising. It was revealed that Georgy Lebedev had previously been the editor of the ultra-right newspaper "Free Siberia", then as part of Ignatov's group at the 10th Congress of the Russian Communist Party (Bolsheviks) he opposed the NEP. Alexei Kozlov was a right-wing SR and joined the Communist Party only in 1921. Lebedev, Kozlov, and Ageev were removed from the leadership and on the night of March 10-11 they were arrested by the Kalandarishvilists.

On June 21, during the battle near the village of Nikoltsy, the rebels suffered a crushing defeat and, after the capture of Churapcha, began to retreat towards Okhotsk. By October 1, the uprising was generally suppressed, but in the fall, a detachment of Anatoly Pepelyaev arrived to help the Yakut rebels. Pepelyaev hoped to take Yakutsk and begin the seizure of Siberia, thereby rekindling the civil war. The dramatic siege of Sasyl-Sysy was the last major battle of the Russian Civil War. After the capture of Amga by the Reds, the battle of Bilistyakh, and the lifting of the siege of Sasyl-Sysy, Pepelyaev's detachment began to retreat towards Okhotsk, where Pepelyaev was arrested by the Reds.

The last White Guards in the north of Sakha surrendered by the end of 1923.

==== Subsequent uprisings ====
In 1924, an uprising began in Sakha, which was caused by the actions of the Bolsheviks: the closure of ports for foreign trade, trade restrictions, interruptions in the import of goods from the mainland, the confiscation of reindeer from private owners, the seizure of vast pastures for industrial new buildings. In 1925, the rebels concluded an armistice with the Soviet authorities and laid down their arms.

However, in 1927, a new uprising began under the leadership of the Yakut lawyer Pavel Ksenofontov (a graduate of the Faculty of Law of Moscow University, an employee of the Ministry of Finance of the RSFSR). After its suppression in 1928, 128 people were shot, 130 received various prison terms, some of them were not related to the uprising. Among the repressed were prominent representatives of the intelligentsia who knew nothing about the uprising or even condemned it.

In mid-1929, after the uprising of the confederalists of 1927-1928, on the tip of the center, a wholesale purge of non-party people disloyal to the new government and members of the local Communist Party itself, accused of counterrevolution, began. This became the reason for a new uprising against Soviet power in the north of Sakha, later called the Bulun uprising. It was subsequently suppressed in 1930.

=== Soviet era ===
Sakha was home to the last stage of the Russian Civil War, the Yakut Revolt. On April 27, 1922, former Yakutsk Oblast was proclaimed the Yakut ASSR, although in fact the eastern part of the territory, including the city of Yakutsk, was controlled by the White Russians.

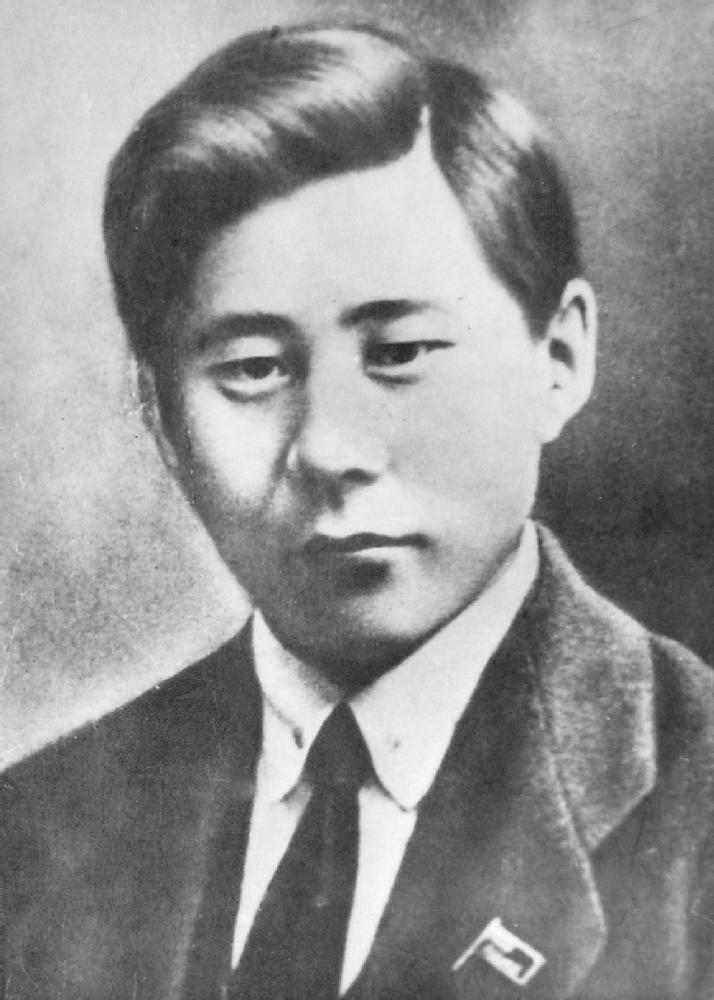
Platon Oyunsky, who wrote the traditionally-oral olonkho epics

The early Soviet period saw a flourishing of Sakha literature as men such as Platon Oyunsky wrote down in writing the traditionally oral and improvised olonkho, in addition to composing their own works. Many early Sakha leaders, including Oyunsky, died in the Great Purge.

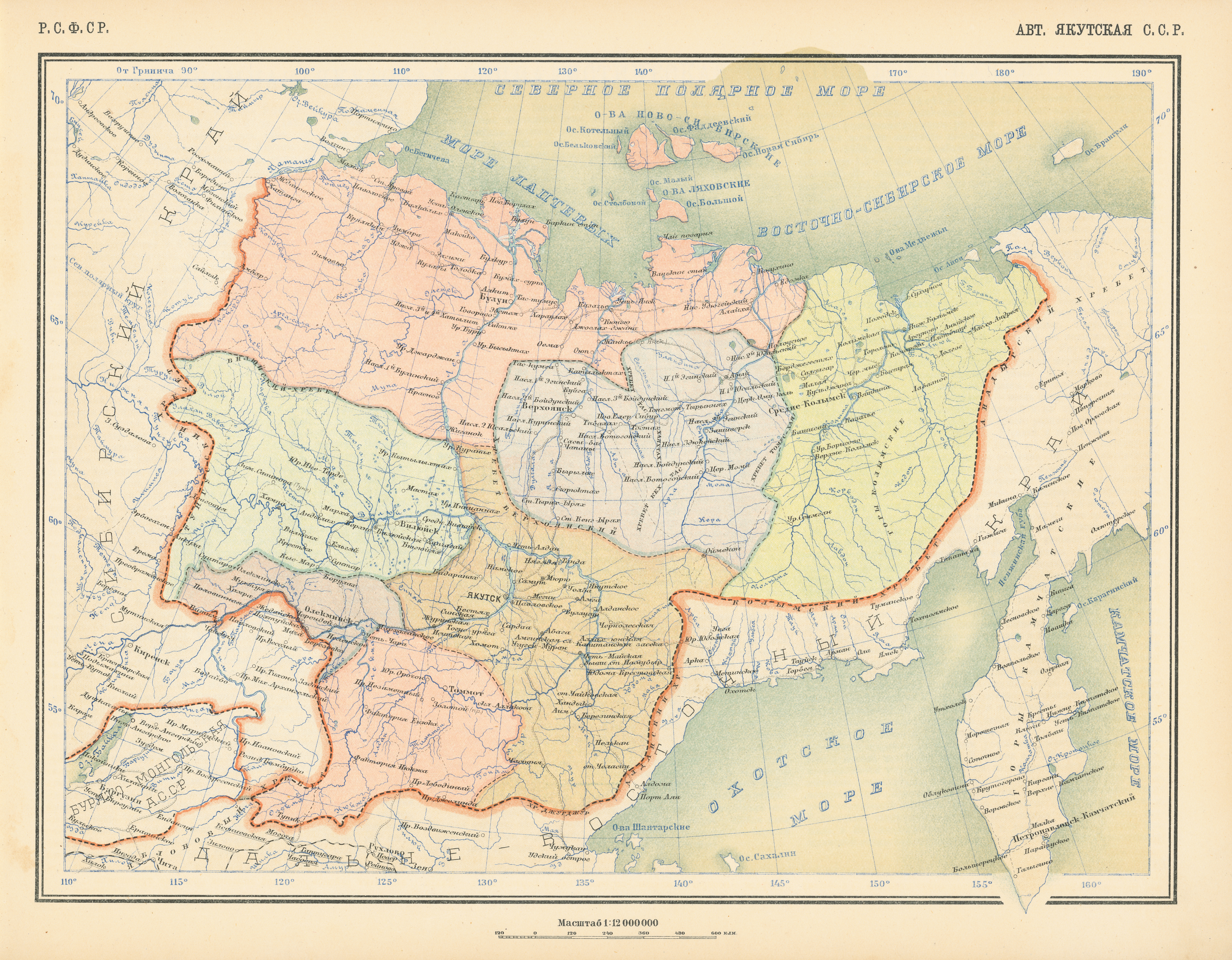
Autonomous Yakut SSR, 1928

Sakha experienced significant collectivization between 1929 and 1934, with the number of households experiencing collectivization rising from 3.6% in 1929 to 41.7% in 1932. Policies by which the Sakha were harshly affected resulted in the population dropping from 240,500 in 1926 down to 236,700 at the 1959 census.

Sakha's demographics shifted wildly during the Soviet period as ethnic Russians and Ukrainians, among other groups, settled the area en masse, primarily in Yakutsk and the industrial south. Previously, even Yakutsk had been primarily Sakha and Sakha-speaking. With the end of korenizatsiya, usage of the Sakha language was restricted in urban areas such as Yakutsk, which became primarily Russian-speaking.

=== Post-Soviet era ===
Following the dissolution of the Soviet Union in December 1991, the Yakut Autonomous Soviet Socialist Republic was officially reconstituted as the Republic of Sakha (Yakutia), a federal subject within the newly formed Russian Federation. In April 1992, Moscow formally recognized this status, granting Sakha significant autonomy; most notably, a 1992 agreement allowing the republic to retain 20% of its diamond industry profits, a landmark concession deviating from decades of centralized resource extraction.

During the early 1990s, Sakha saw a rise in ethnic and nationalist activism. Political movements such as Sakha Omuk (founded 1990) and the more radical Sakha Keskile promoted Yakut sovereignty, resource self‑management, and cultural revival. These movements led to the republic's 1990 declaration of sovereignty (celebrated each year on September 27) and a gradual shift away from the ethnic suppression of the Soviet era.

Economically, Sakha faced the tumultuous transition to a market economy amid systemic Soviet collapse. The regional government actively supported privatization of state enterprises, offered tax incentives, subsidies, and direct investment to buffer the population from economic shocks. The republic also passed legislation in the 1990s to protect Indigenous land use rights and foster the creation of clan-based communities, reinforcing traditional livelihoods.

In 2000, Sakha was incorporated into the newly created Far Eastern Federal District, one of eight federal districts established by President Vladimir Putin to centralize administrative oversight. While this shift integrated Sakha into Far East economic development initiatives—including tax incentives, special economic zones, and infrastructure investments—these programs have often favoured industrial and extractive interests, occasionally sidelining Indigenous land rights.

Under Putin, federal centralization increased. Regional autonomy has been curtailed through legal reforms—such as a 2009 removal of sovereignty references from the republic's constitution and renaming the republic's presidential post in 2014—and through restrictions on local veto powers regarding resource projects. At the same time, Sakha's economy, driven by mining (diamonds, gold, uranium, oil, and natural gas), has shown resilience. Wages in the region now outpace national averages when adjusted for cost of living. Yakutsk remains the hub of administrative and economic leadership, buoyed by tourism and essential infrastructure projects, though remote areas still lag behind.

== Demographics ==
Population: 995,686 (2021 census); 958,528 (2010 census); 949,280 (2002 census); 1,081,408 (1989 Soviet census). Population density is 0.31 per km^{2} (2019), which is one of the lowest among Russian districts. Urban population: 65,45% (2018).

=== Settlements ===
Largest cities or towns in the Sakha Republic 2021 Russian Census
Rank		Administrative division	Pop.
1	Yakutsk	City of republic significance of Yakutsk	355,443
2	Neryungri	Neryungrinsky District	53,409
3	Mirny	Mirninsky District	34,045
4	Aldan	Aldansky District	21,590
5	Lensk	Lensky District	21,392
6	Aykhal	Mirninsky District	13,370
7	Udachny	Mirninsky District	12,930
8	Suntar	Suntarsky District	10,302
9	Nyurba	Nyurbinsky District	10,138
10	Vilyuysk	Vilyuysky District	10,032

=== Vital statistics ===
Historical population
Year	Pop.	±%
1897	269,880	—
1926	283,468	+5.0%
1939	413,198	+45.8%
1959	487,343	+17.9%
1970	664,123	+36.3%
1979	838,808	+26.3%
1989	1,081,408	+28.9%
2002	949,280	−12.2%
2010	958,528	+1.0%
2021	995,686	+3.9%
2025	1,007,058	+1.1%
Source: Census data, estimate

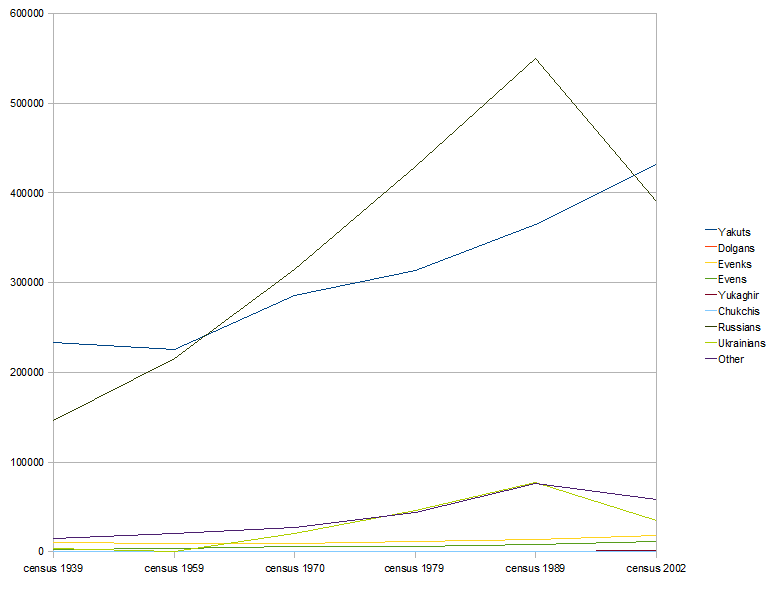
Breakdown of population changes, 1939–2002

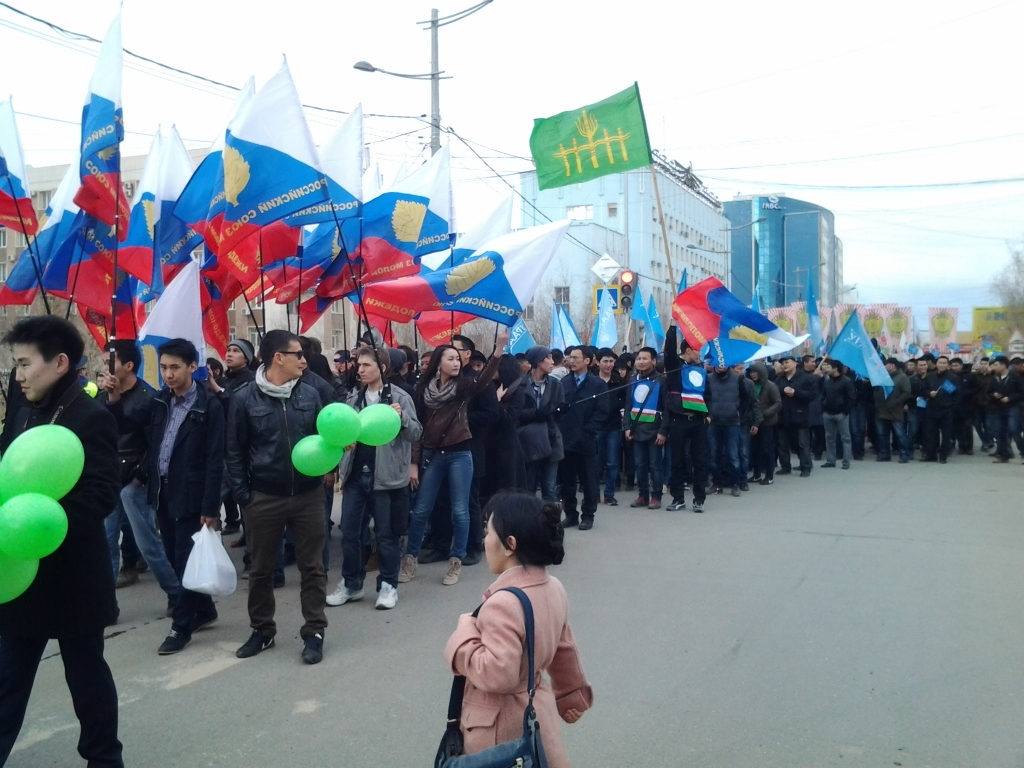
Statehood Day celebrations in Yakutsk

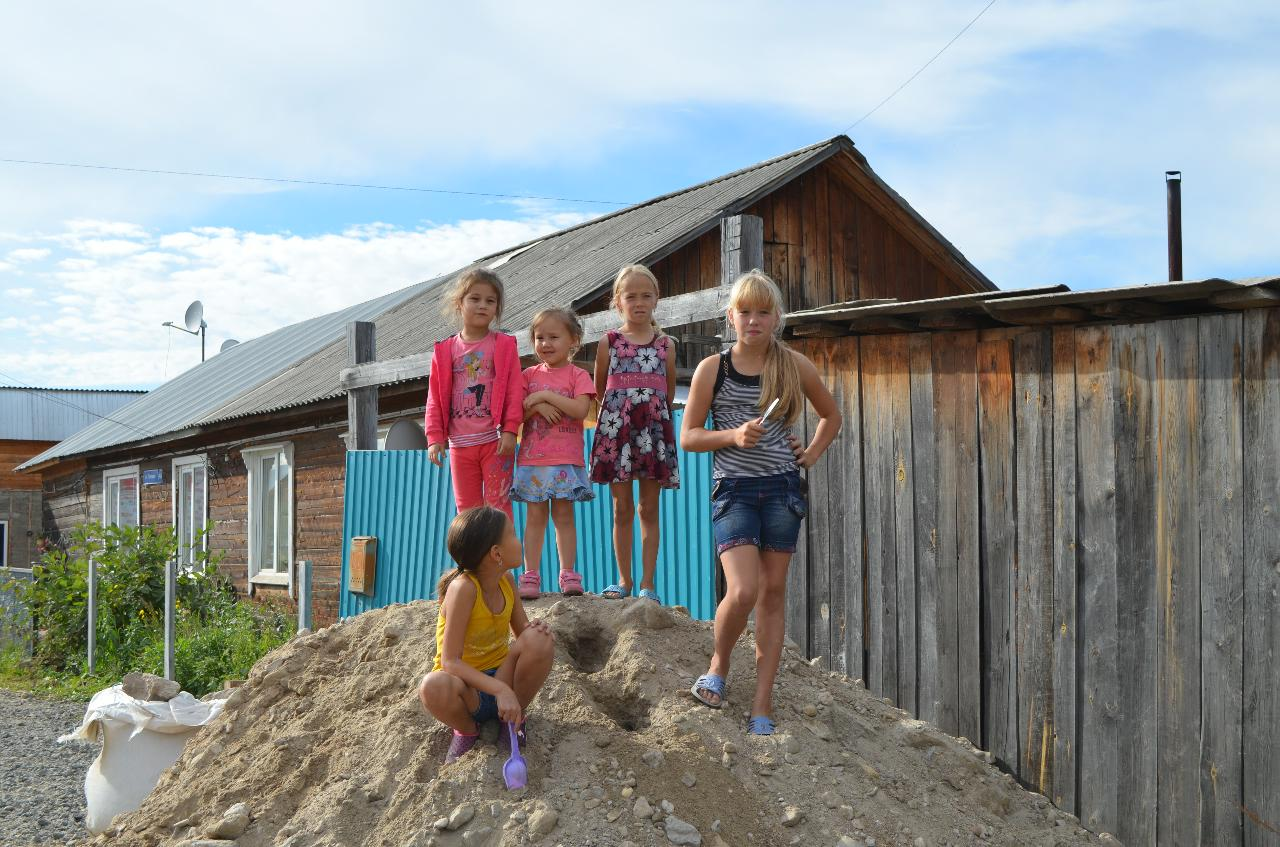
Vitim, Sakha Republic

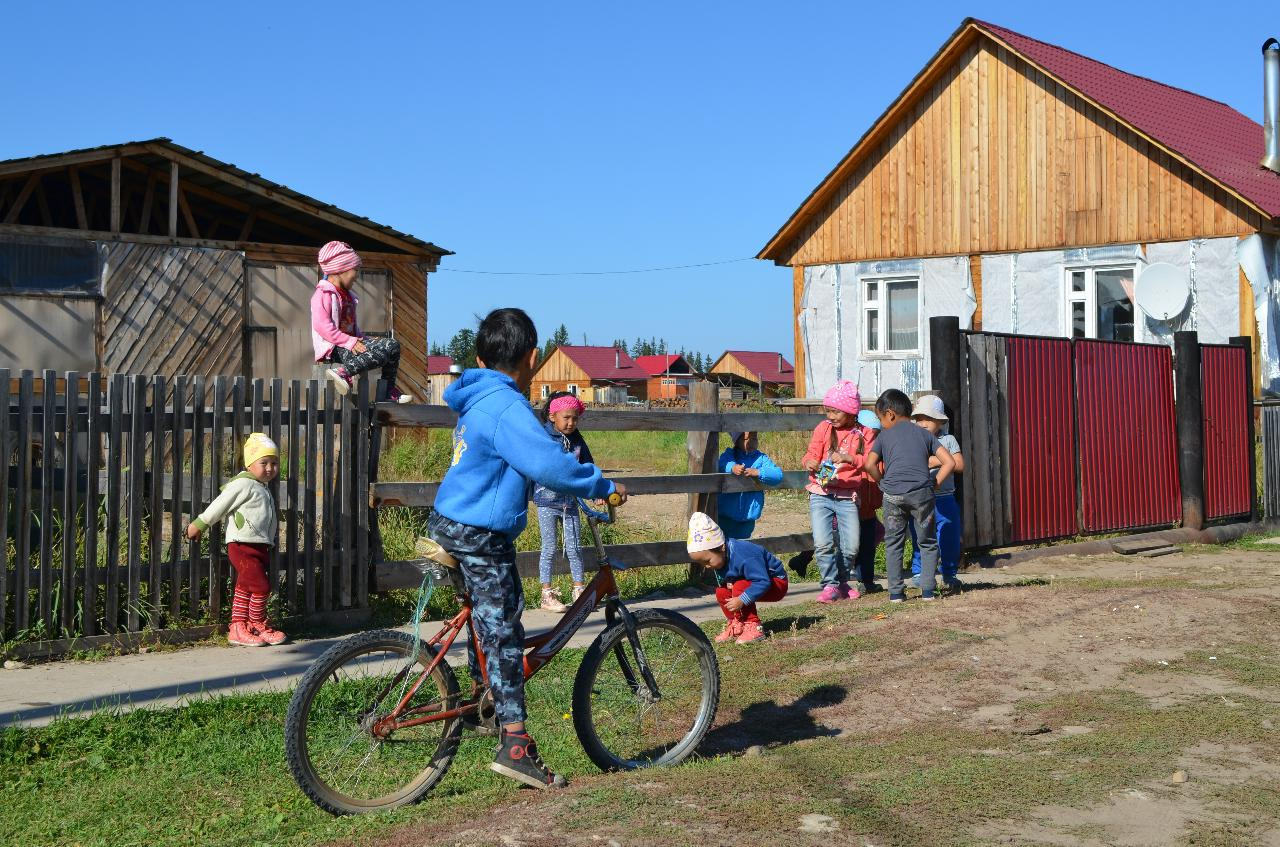
Dapparay

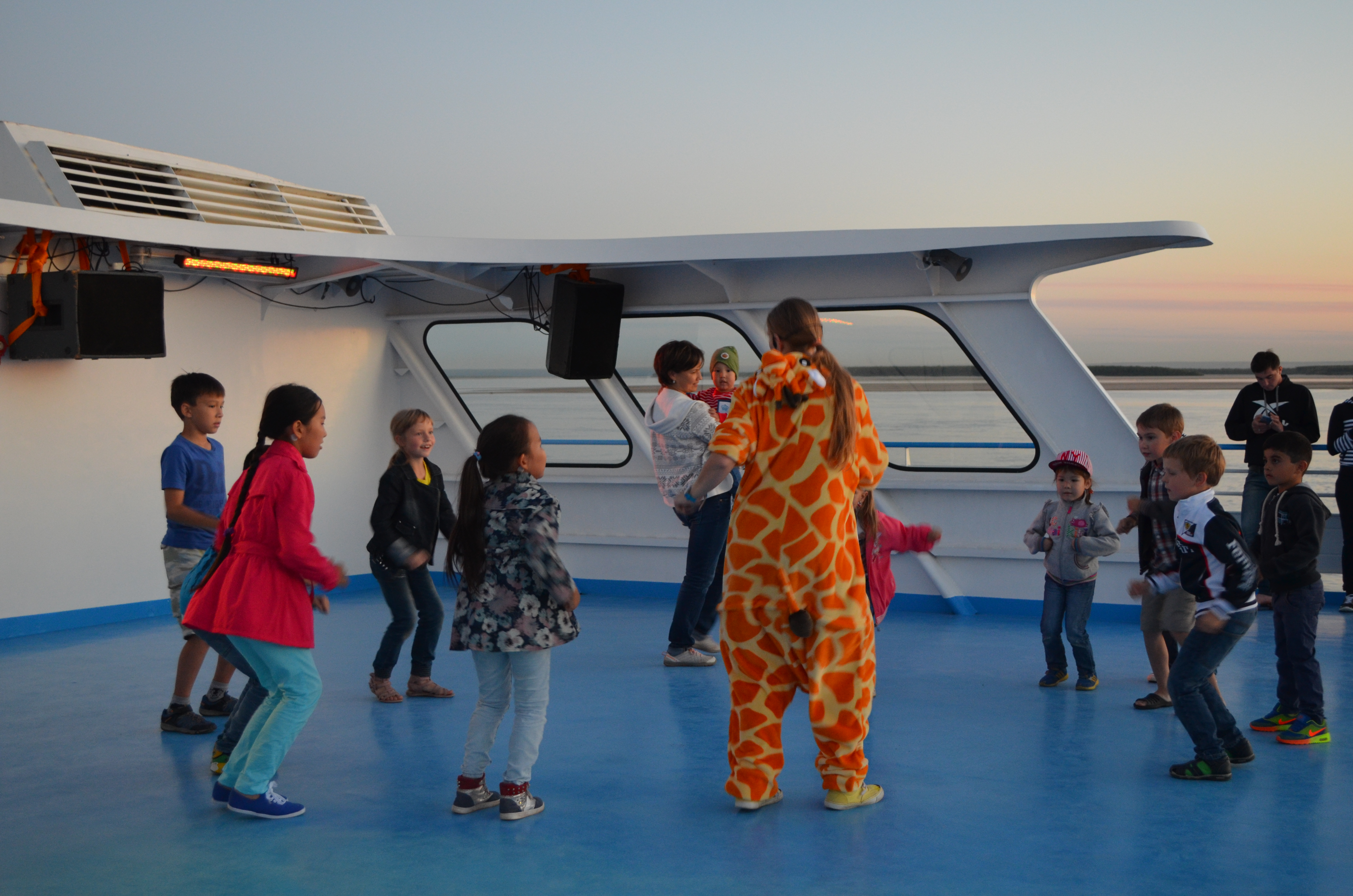
Cruise on the Lena River

Source: Russian Federal State Statistics Service

Year	Average population (x 1000)	Live births	Deaths	Natural change	Crude birth rate (per 1000)	Crude death rate (per 1000)	Natural change (per 1000)	Fertility rates
1970	674	13,899	5,700	8,199	20.6	8.5	12.2	
1975	775	15,636	6,242	9,394	20.2	8.1	12.1	
1980	887	18,132	7,501	10,631	20.4	8.5	12.0	
1985	1,002	22,823	7,266	15,557	22.8	7.3	15.5	
1990	1,115	21,662	7,470	14,192	19.4	6.7	12.7	2.46
1991	1,110	19,805	7,565	12,240	17.8	6.8	11.0	2.32
1992	1,090	17,796	8,710	9,086	16.3	8.0	8.3	2.17
1993	1,072	16,771	9,419	7,352	15.6	8.8	6.9	2.08
1994	1,051	16,434	10,371	6,063	15.6	9.9	5.8	2.07
1995	1,029	15,731	10,079	5,652	15.3	9.8	5.5	2.01
1996	1,015	14,584	9,638	4,946	14.4	9.5	4.9	1.88
1997	1,003	13,909	9,094	4,815	13.9	9.1	4.8	1.81
1998	986	13,640	8,856	4,784	13.8	9.0	4.9	1.80
1999	970	12,724	9,480	3,244	13.1	9.8	3.3	1.71
2000	960	13,147	9,325	3,822	13.7	9.7	4.0	1.77
2001	954	13,262	9,738	3,524	13.9	10.2	3.7	1.78
2002	950	13,887	9,700	4,187	14.6	10.2	4.4	1.85
2003	949	14,224	9,660	4,564	15.0	10.2	4.8	1.86
2004	950	14,716	9,692	5,024	15.5	10.2	5.3	1.91
2005	950	13,591	9,696	3,895	14.3	10.2	4.1	1.74
2006	950	13,713	9,245	4,468	14.4	9.7	4.7	1.73
2007	951	15,268	9,179	6,089	16.1	9.7	6.4	1.92
2008	953	15,363	9,579	5,784	16.1	10.1	6.1	1.92
2009	955	15,970	9,353	6,617	16.7	9.8	6.9	2.00
2010	958	16,109	9,402	6,707	16.8	9.8	7.0	2.02
2011	957	16,402	8,992	7,410	17.1	9.4	7.7	2.06
2012	956	16,998	8,918	8,080	17.8	9.3	8.5	2.17
2013	955	16,704	8,351	8,353	17.5	8.7	8.8	2.17
2014	956	17,010	8,209	8,801	17.8	8.6	9.2	2.25
2015	958	16,459	8,233	8,226	17.1	8.6	8.5	2.19
2016	961	15,424	8,052	7,372	16.0	8.4	7.6	2.09
2017	963	13,954	7,817	6,137	14.5	8.1	6.4	1.93
2018	964	13,234	7,572	5,662	13.7	7.8	5.9	1.85
2019	967	12,819	7,611	5,208	13.2	7.8	5.4	1.82
2020	972	13,097	9,081	4,016	13.4	9.3	4.1	1.86
2021		12,309	10,600	1,709	12.5	10.8	1.7	1.73
2022		11,824	8,319	3,505	11.9	8.4	3.5	1.62
2023		11,194	7,721	3,473	11.2	7.7	3.5	1.55
2024		10,778	8,243	2,535	10.7	8.2	2.5	1.52

=== Ethnic groups ===
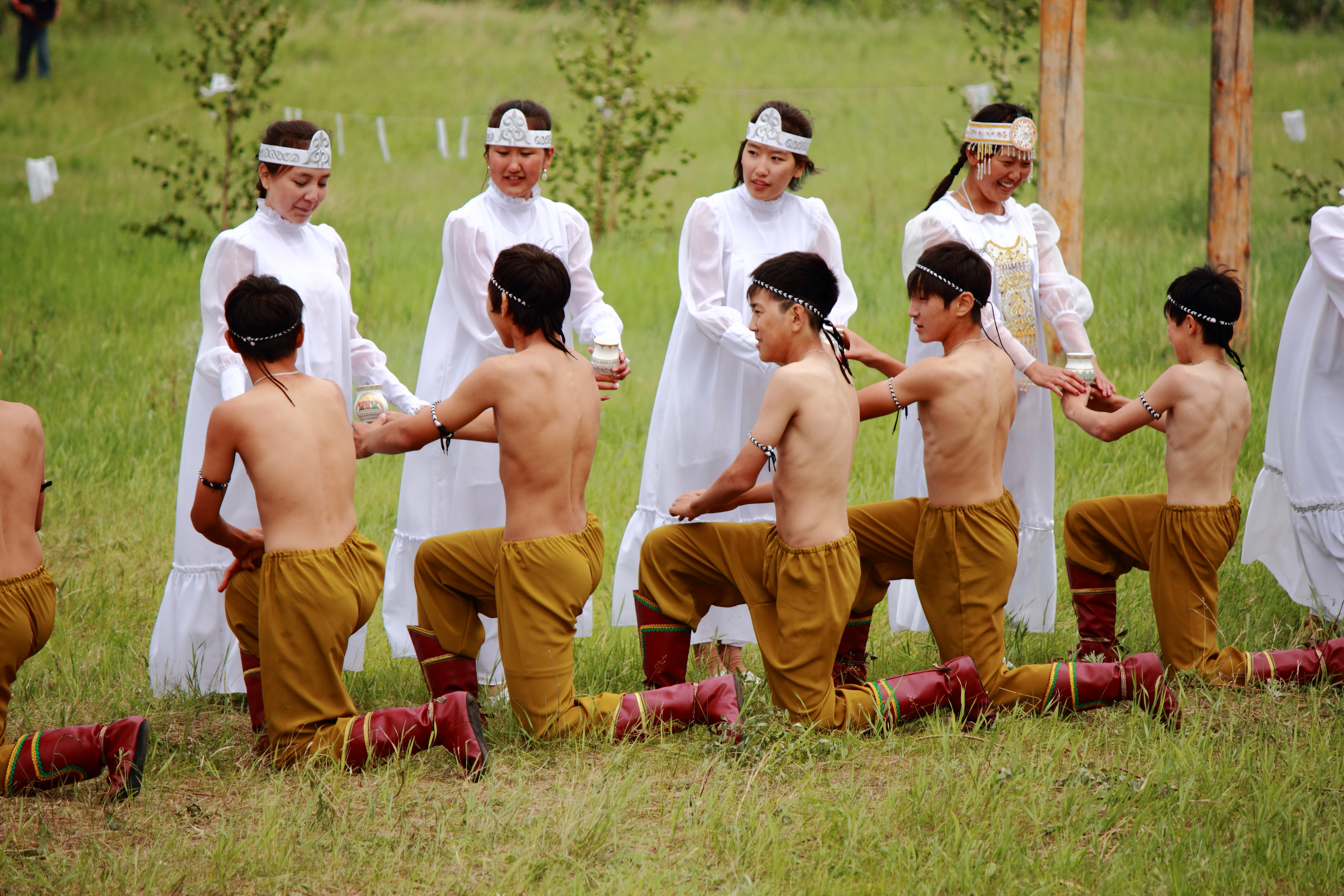
Yakuts celebrating Yhyakh. Yakuts form the easternmost indigenous community of Turkic peoples.

Ethnic map of Yakutia by urban and rural settlements, 2002 and 2010 censuses. Russians Yakuts/Sakha Evenks Evens Chukchis Yukagirs Dolgans

According to the 2021 Census, the ethnic composition was:

- 469,348 Sakha (55.3%)
- 276,986 Russians (32.6%)
- 24,334 Evenks (2.9%)
- 13,233 Evens (1.6%)
- 11,203 Kyrgyz (1.3%)
- 7,169 Ukrainians (0.8%)
- 6,572 Buryats (0.8%)
- 5,620 Tajiks (0.7%)

Historical population figures are shown below:

Ethnic group	1926 Census		1939 Census		1959 Census		1970 Census		1979 Census		1989 Census		2002 Census		2010 Census		2021 Census^{1}	
Ethnic group	Number	%	Number	%	Number	%	Number	%	Number	%	Number	%	Number	%	Number	%	Number	%
Sakha	235,926	81.6%	233,273	56.5%	226,053	46.4%	285,749	43.0%	313,917	36.9%	365,236	33.4%	432,290	45.5%	466,492	49.9%	469,348	55.3%
Dolgans	0	0.0%	233,273	56.5%	226,053	46.4%	10	0.0%	64	0.0%	408	0.0%	1,272	0.1%	1,906	0.2%	2,147	0.3%
Evenks	13,502	4.7%	10,432	2.5%	9,505	2.0%	9,097	1.4%	11,584	1.4%	14,428	1.3%	18,232	1.9%	21,008	2.2%	24,334	2.9%
Evens	738	0.3%	3,133	0.8%	3,537	0.7%	6,471	1.0%	5,763	0.7%	8,668	0.8%	11,657	1.2%	15,071	1.6%	13,233	1.6%
Yukaghir	396	0.1%	267	0.1%	285	0.1%	400	0.1%	526	0.1%	697	0.1%	1,097	0.1%	1,281	0.1%	1,510	0.2%
Chukchis	1,298	0.4%	400	0.1%	325	0.1%	387	0.1%	377	0.0%	473	0.0%	602	0.1%	670	0.1%	709	0.1%
Russians	30,156	10.4%	146,741	35.5%	215,328	44.2%	314,308	47.3%	429,588	50.4%	550,263	50.3%	390,671	41.2%	353,649	37.8%	276,986	32.6%
Ukrainians	138	0.0%	4,229	1.0%	12,182	2.5%	20,253	3.0%	46,326	5.4%	77,114	7.0%	34,633	3.6%	20,341	2.2%	7,169	0.8%
Tatars	1,671	0.6%	4,420	1.1%	5,172	1.1%	7,678	1.2%	10.976	1.3%	17,478	1.6%	10,768	1.1%	8,122	0.9%	4,262	0.5%
Others	5,260	1.8%	10,303	2.5%	14,956	3.1%	19,770	3.0%	32,719	3.8%	59,300	5.4%	48,058	5.1%	46,124	4.9%	49,070	5.8%
^{1} 146,918 people were registered from administrative databases, and could not declare an ethnicity. It is estimated that the proportion of ethnicities in this group is the same as that of the declared group.

=== Languages ===
The official languages are both Russian and Sakha, also known as Yakut, which is spoken by roughly half of the republic's population. In the 2021 census, 95% of Yakuts, 72% of Evenks and 60% of Evens declared Sakha as their native language. The Sakha language is a member of the Turkic language family, belonging to the Siberian branch. It is closely related to the Dolgan language of the former Taymyr Dolgano-Nenets Autonomous Okrug.

The Sakha Republic is also home to many of the world's speakers of Tungusic languages, primarily of Evenki and Even. Additionally, Chukchi and the dialects of the Yukaghir language family are spoken in the northeast.

Ethnicity	Native language		
Ethnicity	Russian	Sakha	Other
Russians	99.4%	0.4%	0.2%
Yakuts	5.0%	95.0%	0.0%
Evenks	12.3%	72.4%	15.3%
Evens	10.7%	60.2%	29.1%

=== Religion ===
Religion in Sakha Republic as of 2012 (Sreda Arena Atlas)
Russian Orthodoxy	37.8%
Protestantism	0.8%
Other Christians	0.8%
Islam	2%
Tengrism and other native faiths	13%
Spiritual but not religious	16.6%
Atheism and irreligion	25.6%
Other and undeclared	4%

Before the arrival of the Russian Empire, the majority of the local population was Tengrist, similar to the other Turkic people of Central Asia, or in Paleoasian indigenous shamanism with both 'light' (community leading) and 'dark' (healing through spirit journey) shamans. Under the Russians, the local population was converted to the Russian Orthodox Church and required to take Orthodox Christian names, but in practice generally continued to follow traditional religions. During the Soviet era, most or all of the shamans died without successors. In the 1990s, a neopagan shamanist movement called aiyy yeurekhé was founded by the controversial journalist Ivan Ukhkhan and a philologist calling himself Téris. This group and others cooperated to build a shaman temple in downtown Yakutsk in 2002.

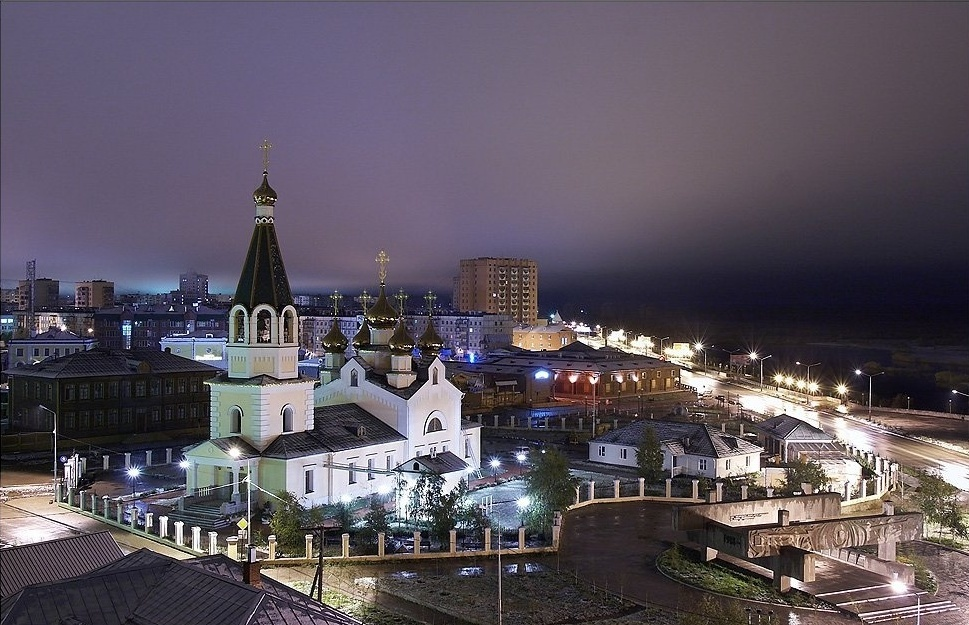
Transfiguration of Jesus Christ Cathedral in Yakutsk

Currently, while Orthodox Christianity maintains a following (however, with very few priests willing to be stationed outside of Yakutsk), there is interest and activity toward renewing the traditional religions. As of 2008, Orthodox leaders described the worldview of the republic's indigenous population (or, rather, those among the population who are not completely indifferent to religion) as dvoyeverie (dual belief system), or a "tendency toward syncretism", as evidenced by the locals sometimes first inviting a shaman, and then an Orthodox priest to carry out their rites in connection with some event in their life.

According to the Information Centre under the President of Sakha Republic (Информационный центр при Президенте РС(Я)), the religious demography of the republic was as follows: Orthodoxy: 44.9%, Shamanism: 26.2%, Non-religious: 23.0%, New religious movements: 2.4%, Islam: 1.2%, Buddhism: 1.0%, Protestantism: 0.9%, Catholicism: 0.4%.

According to a 2012 survey, 37.8% of the population of Sakha adheres to the Russian Orthodox Church, 13% to Tengrism or Sakha shamanism, 2% to Islam, 1% are unaffiliated Christians, 1% to forms of Protestantism, and 0.4% to Tibetan Buddhism. In addition, 26% of the population deems itself atheist, 17% is "spiritual but not religious", and 1.8% follows other religions or did not give an answer to the question.

=== Education ===
The most important facilities of higher education include North-Eastern Federal University (previously Yakutsk State University) and Yakutsk State Agricultural Academy.

== Politics ==
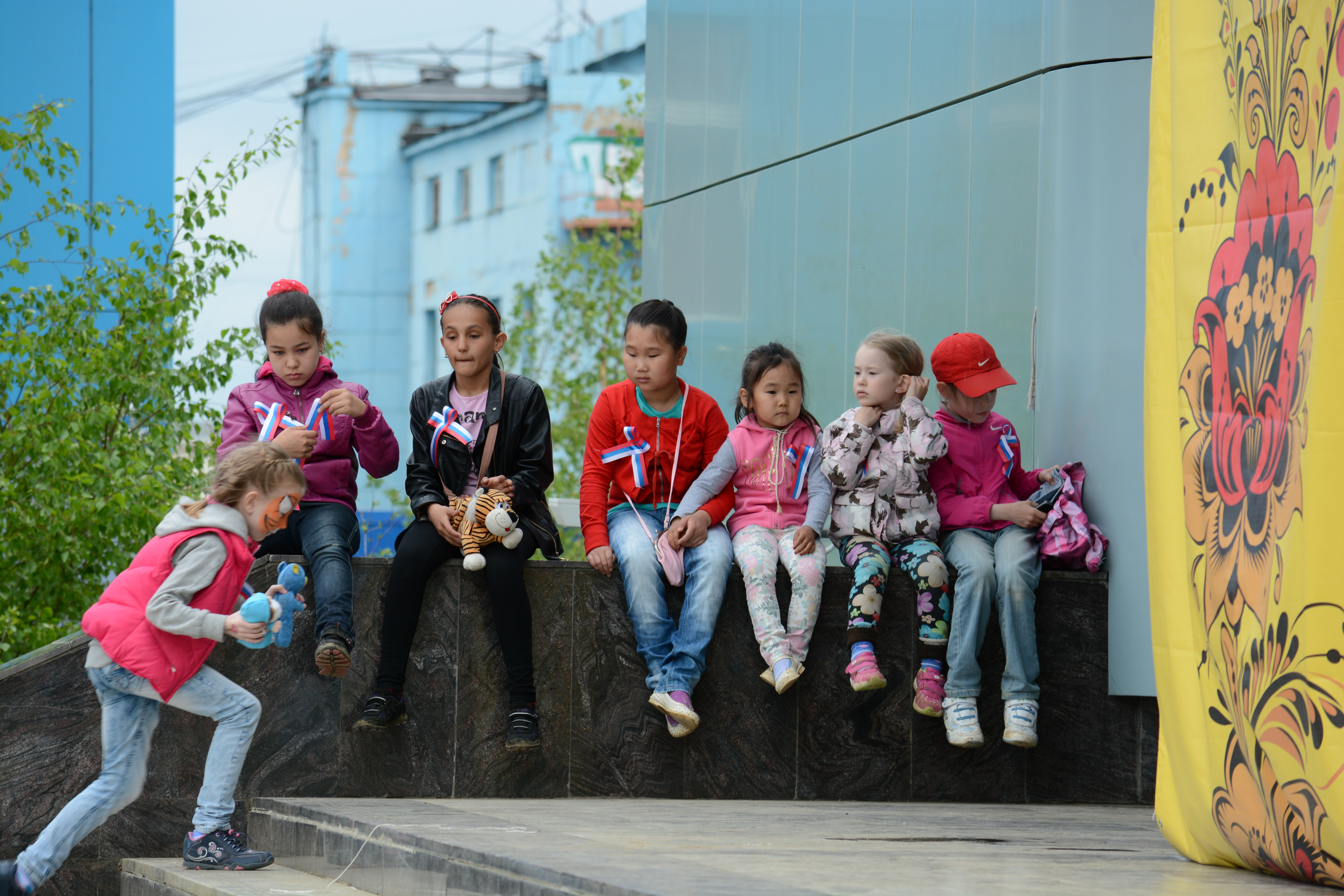
Russia Day celebrations in Mirny, 12 June 2014.

The head of government in Sakha is the Head (previously President). The first Head of the Sakha Republic was Mikhail Yefimovich Nikolayev. As of 2021, the head is Aysen Nikolayev, who took office on 28 May 2018.

The supreme legislative body of state authority in Sakha is a unicameral State Assembly known as the Il Tumen. The government of the Sakha (Yakutia) Republic is the executive body of state authority.

The republic fosters close cultural, political, economic, and industrial relations with the independent Turkic states through membership in organisations such as the Turkic Council and the Joint Administration of Turkic Arts and Culture.

== Economy ==
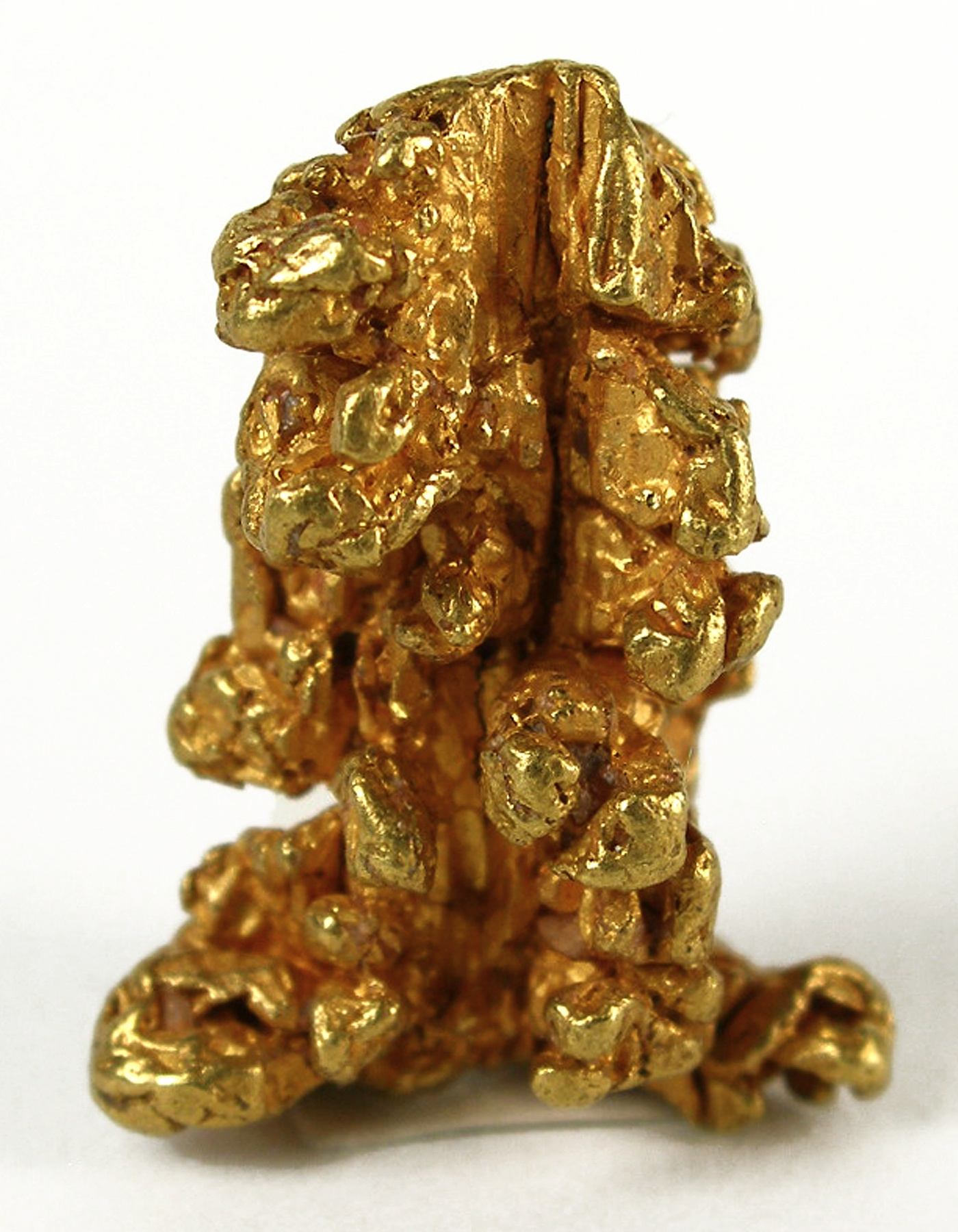
Unusual gold specimen from Bulun District, Lena River basin. Weight is about 6 grams.

The largest companies in the region include Alrosa, Yakutugol, Yakutskenergo, and Yakutia Airlines.

Controversially, social support in the area is largely granted to the less needy despite rural poverty remaining high.

=== Mining ===
The Mirny diamond mine and other diamond mines are important sources of exports for the region. In addition, tin and gold mining have been major but controversial industries for over 100 years.

=== Transportation ===
Water transport ranks first for cargo turnover. There are six river ports, two seaports (Tiksi and Zelyony Mys). Four shipping companies, including the Arctic Sea Shipping Company, operate in the republic. The republic's main waterway is the Lena River, which links Yakutsk with the rail station of Ust-Kut in Irkutsk Oblast.

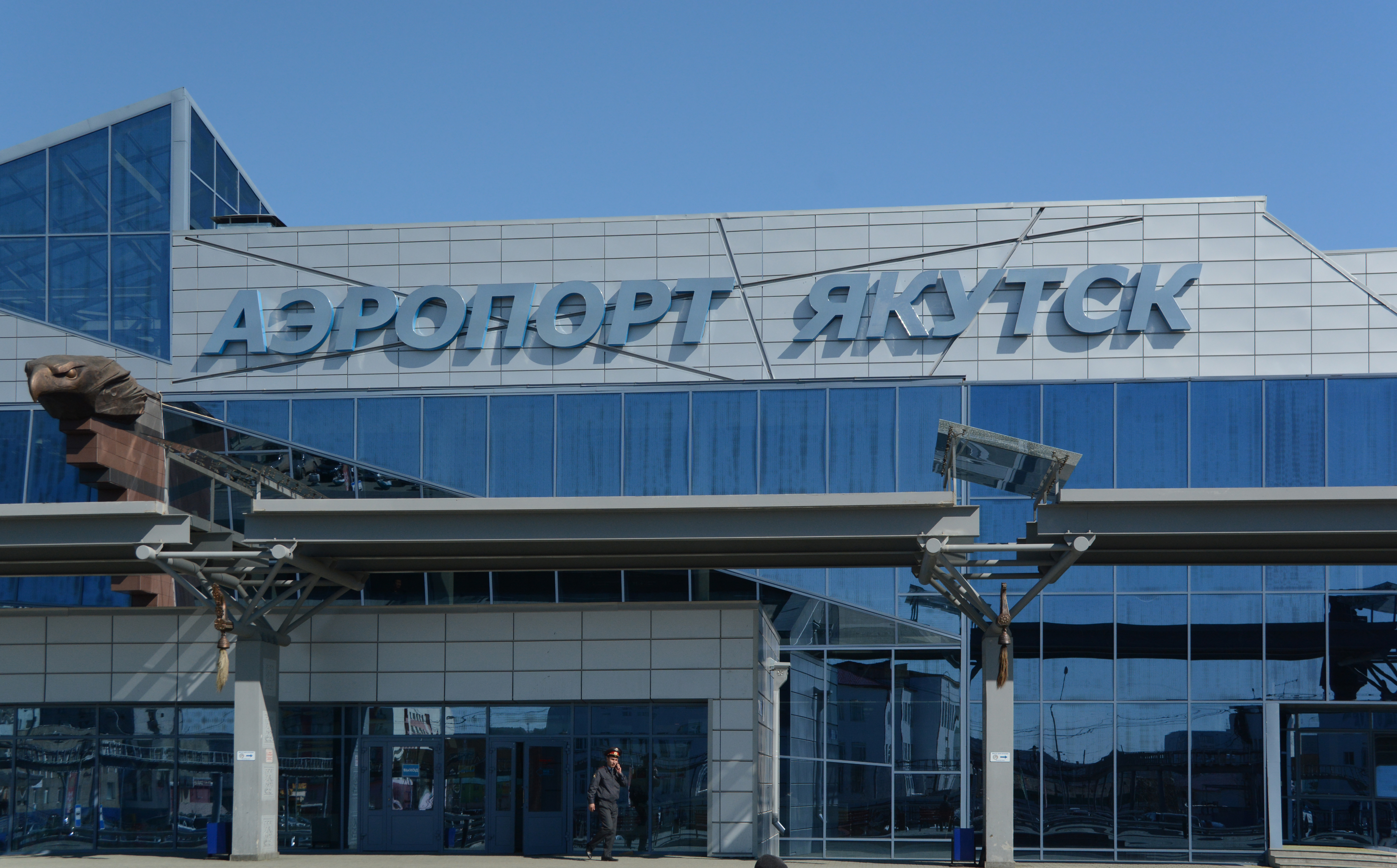
Yakutsk Aeroport, the main air-traffic hub of the republic.

Air transport is the most important for transporting people. Airlines connect the republic with most regions of Russia. Yakutsk Airport has an international terminal.

Two federal roads pass the republic. They are Nizhny Bestyakh–Skovorodino (A360 Lena highway) and Nizhny Bestyakh–Magadan (M56 Kolyma Highway). However, due to the presence of permafrost, use of asphalt was formerly impractical, and therefore the roads were made of clay until being paved by 2014. Prior to the paving of these roads, when heavy rains blew over the region, the roads often turned to mud, sometimes stranding hundreds of travellers in the process. The Lena Bridge is under construction across the Lena, which will connect Yakutsk to Nizhny Bestyakh, and thus the rest of the Russian road network, year-round. Construction began in 2024, and is planned to last until 2028.

The Berkakit–Tommot railroad is currently in operation. It links the Baikal-Amur Mainline with the industrial centres in South Sakha. Construction of the Amur–Yakutsk Mainline continues northward; the railway was completed to Nizhny Bestyakh, across the river from Yakutsk, in 2013. Though this one-track railroad from Tommot to Nizhny Bestyakh was under temporary operation (30% of its full capacity), the federal agency for railways declared that this railroad would be in full operation in fall 2015. Since 2019, there have been passenger trains between Nizhny Bestyakh and the rest of Russia.

== Media ==
NVK Sakha (national broadcaster company Sakha, Национальная вещательная компания Саха, "Саха" көрдөрөр иһитиннэрэр тэрилтэтэ), the largest media company in the Republic of Sakha (Yakutia). The company owns dozens of TV channels in Yakutia, Russia, and other countries. The main broadcasting languages are Yakut, English, Russian and Evenk. It was founded in 1992 after the collapse of the USSR. 70% of the shares are owned by the Russian VGTRK, 25% are owned by Yakutia, and 5% are in free float. NVK Sakha owns its own animation and film production studios, and some music studios. Since 2018, it has also been streaming 24/7 on YouTube.

== Culture ==
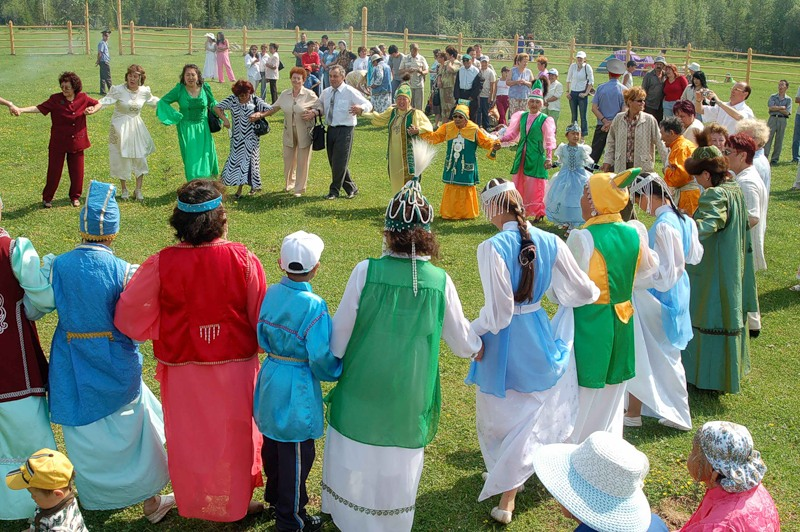
Sakha dance with traditional clothing

Points of interest in the city of Yakutsk include:

- the State Russian drama theatre named after Alexander Pushkin
- the Sakha Theater named after Platon Oyunsky
- the State Academic Opera and Ballet Theatre named after D. K. Sivtsev
- Suorun Omoloon, the Young Spectator's Theatre

There are a number of museums as well. These include the National Fine Arts Museum of Sakha, the Museum of Local Lore and History named after E. Yaroslavsky, and the Khomus Museum and Museum of Permafrost. In September 2020, the Gagarin Centre for Culture and Contemporary Art was opened in the Gagarin District of Yakutsk.

The Yakuts have fully preserved their native language, which differs significantly from other Turkic languages by the presence of a layer of unique Paleo-Asiatic vocabulary. The Yakut language has a developed literary tradition with many styles and genres, and the ancient Sakha epic Olonkho is recognised by UNESCO as a masterpiece of the oral and intangible heritage of humanity.

In the 2010s, a movie boom began in Yakutia. The local film industry was nicknamed "Sakhawood".

== National days ==
- 27 April: Republic Day
- 21 June: Yhyakh festival (also known as Sakha New Year)

== See also ==
- Cuisine of Sakha
- Lena Pillars
- Tukulan
- List of rural localities in the Sakha Republic
- Music in the Sakha Republic
- Tuymaada
- Yakutian knife
- Yakut language
