= Yamal cuisine =

Part of national culture of Nenets, Khanty and Komi

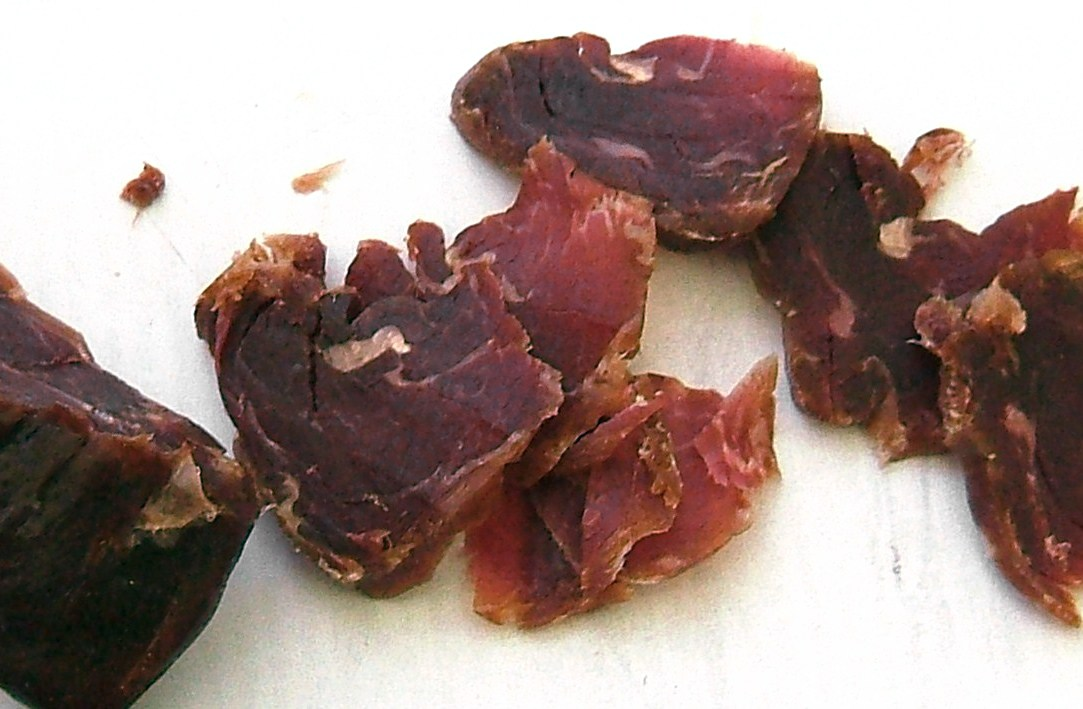
Dried reindeer meat

Traditional Yamal cuisine is an important part of national culture of the Nenets, Khanty and Komi. Yamal is a hunting and fishing land so many dishes include meat, fowl and fish. Berries and mushrooms are also abundant; this accounts for the wealth of "gifts of the forests" on the Yamal table. Presently, Yamal cuisine is renowned for diverse delicacies of Russian cuisine. Yamal hosts enjoy treating their guests with traditional Yamal cuisine and have hot tea which came to Yamal cuisine from Russia. Tea has become the national Yamal beverage, drunk to warm and soothe. Yamal is in northern Russia with frigid winters, so its cuisine should be nourishing to give the people energy to survive during the long winter time. The essential component of Yamal cuisine is warm and hot dishes. Fresh fruits and vegetables are rarely used as they must be imported, as they are not grown in the tundra. The Yamal cuisine is associated with malosol and stroganina. Yamal cuisine has absorbed techniques from other regions. Yamal cuisine is based on reindeer meat and fish of the Yamal rivers, enriched with mushrooms and bread.

The most known dishes of Yamal cuisine are: Fish Soup made from burbot, Malosol, Bread on the Selkup, Stroganina (Sliced Fish), Chopsy Shomoh, Warka, Sliced meat, Preserves of vendace, Kulebyaka (pie with fish), and Aibat-nyarhul (raw fish).

== Uha ==
Fish soup, uha, is typically served as the first course at dinner and drunk from a mug. Fish is cut into pieces and immersed in cold water. When boiling, the cauldron is moved aside to slow fire and skimmed when necessary. It should be brewed to a bluish-gray color and served at once.

== Malosol ==
Malosol comes from Muksun. The key secret to this dish is cutting the fish into very delicate slices very fast in order that the fish remains slightly frozen. It is prepared from just caught muksun. Fish are gutted and cleaned, and liberally sprinkled with salt then held for 3-4 hours.

== Bread of Selkup ==
"Bread is head for everything" is a saying of Russians and Selkups. It symbolizes hospitality of the house. Bread is mentioned among the Selkups as early as the 8th-9th centuries. The bread is baked not in an oven as Russians do, although the initial stages are the same. Flour is mixed with water and salt. Soda is used instead of yeast to raise the dough and it is baked in very hot sand over fire.

== Hot smoked fish ==
Yamal cuisine has four principal types of fish dishes: “as it is”, boiled, baked and smoked. Smoked fish is very popular on the table nowadays. Hot smoked fish is prepared in the towns and villages, although it is not the national dish. Camp cooking uses an aluminum saucepan filled with smoldering sawdust, topped with a wire grid. A low heat is all that is needed to give the fish a golden hue, indicating doneness.

== Stroganina (sliced fish) ==
Stroganina have always been a pride of Yamal. It is a delicacy and a simple food which is prepared from frozen white salmon. Strips of skin are cut from the back and abdomen from tail to head. Vertical incisions are made in the flesh. The fish is placed head down on a hard surface and skinned. With sostragivaetsya, the fish is in thin slices or layers, depending on whether male or female fish are used.
