= Sakha cuisine =

Culinary traditions of the Sakha Republic

Sakha cuisine (Yakut: Саха аһа, romanized: Saxa aha) encompasses the customary and traditional cooking techniques and culinary arts of Sakha.

== Food availability ==
Sakha cuisine is influenced by the area's northern climate and the traditional pastoral lifestyle of the Sakha people, as well as Russian cuisine. Sakha cuisine generally relies heavily on dairy products, meat, fish, and foraged goods. Food is generally prepared through boiling (meat, fish), fermentation (kumis, suorat), or freezing (meat, fish).

== Dishes ==
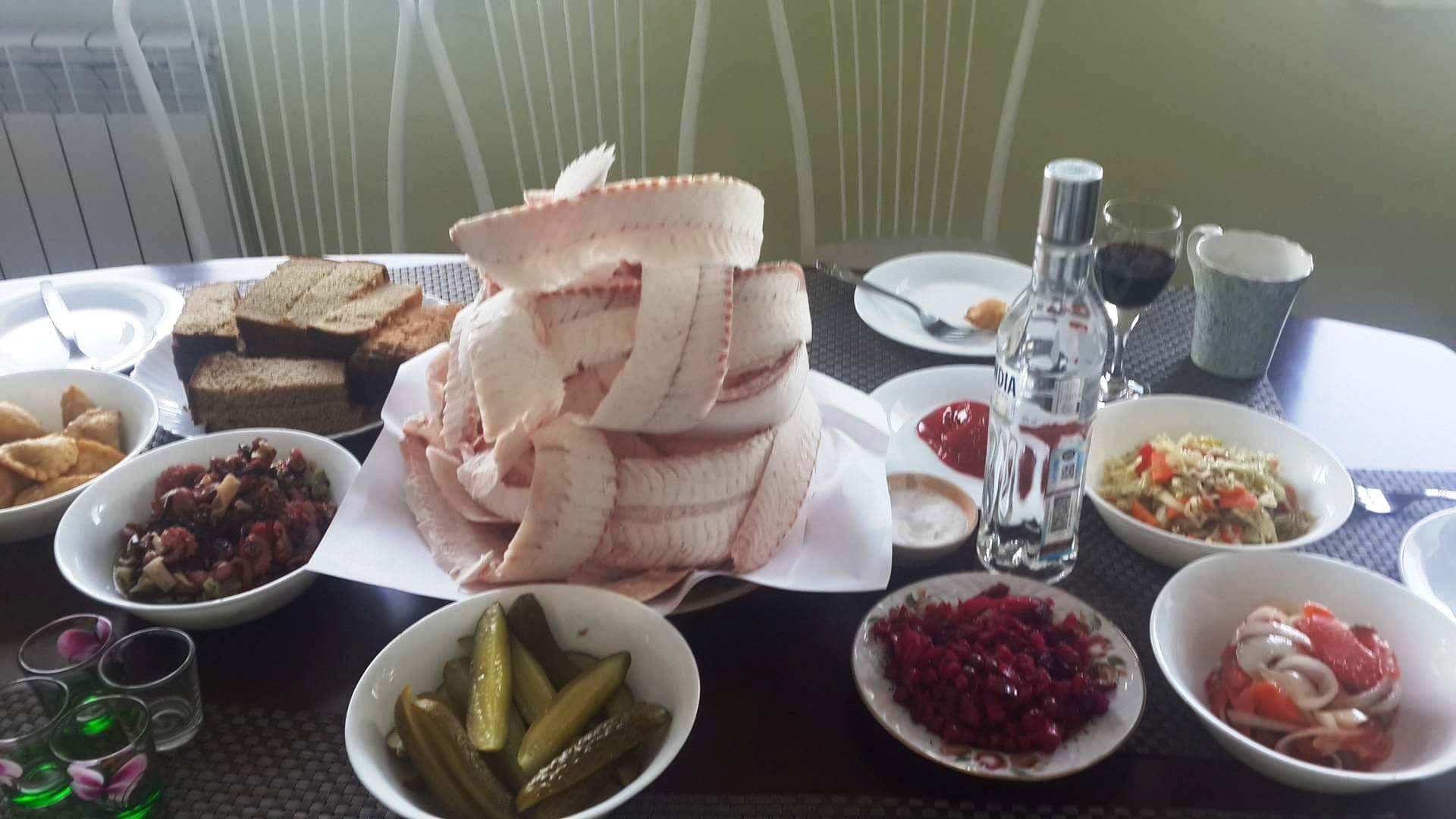
Stroganina, a popular Sakha dish.

One of the best-known Sakha dishes is stroganina, thin slices of raw, frozen fish. However, stroganina is also prepared using foal meat and liver. This is eaten with a spicy seasoning from a flask. Another popular fish dish is indigirka, consisting of frozen fish cubes seasoned with onions, salt, pepper, and more.

Milk is drunk and also used to make butter, curds, and a thick yogurt called suorat.

A popular dish is khaan, a type of blood sausage made from horse or beef blood and intestines.

Kumis, a fermented alcoholic drink made from mare's milk, is widely drunk among the Sakha.

One of the most popular desserts is kierchekh, a sweet dish made with cream, berries, and sugar, to which milk can also be added.

Cuisine
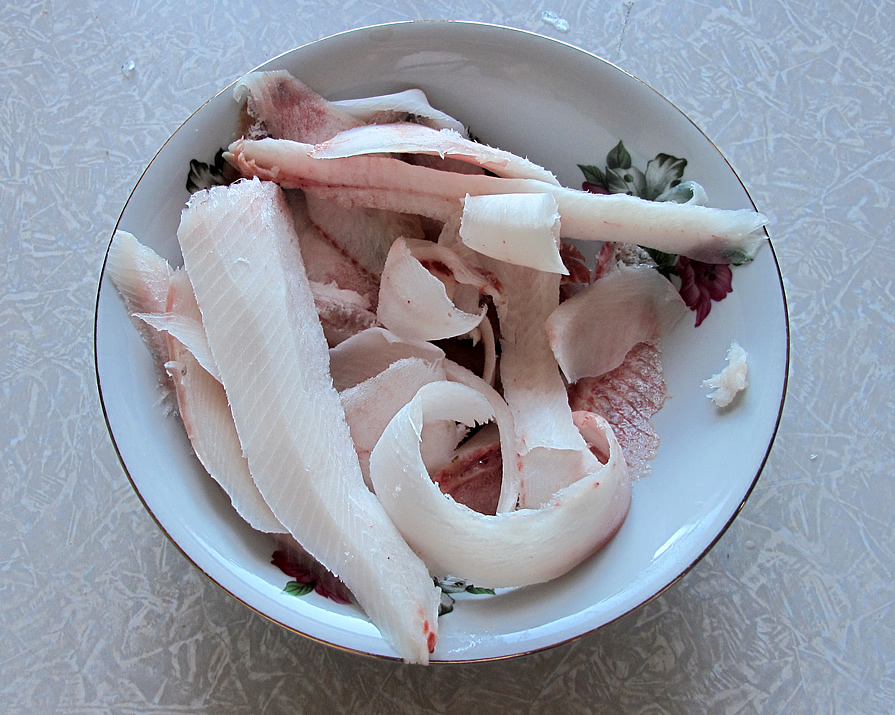
Stroganina is traditionally made with freshwater whitefish

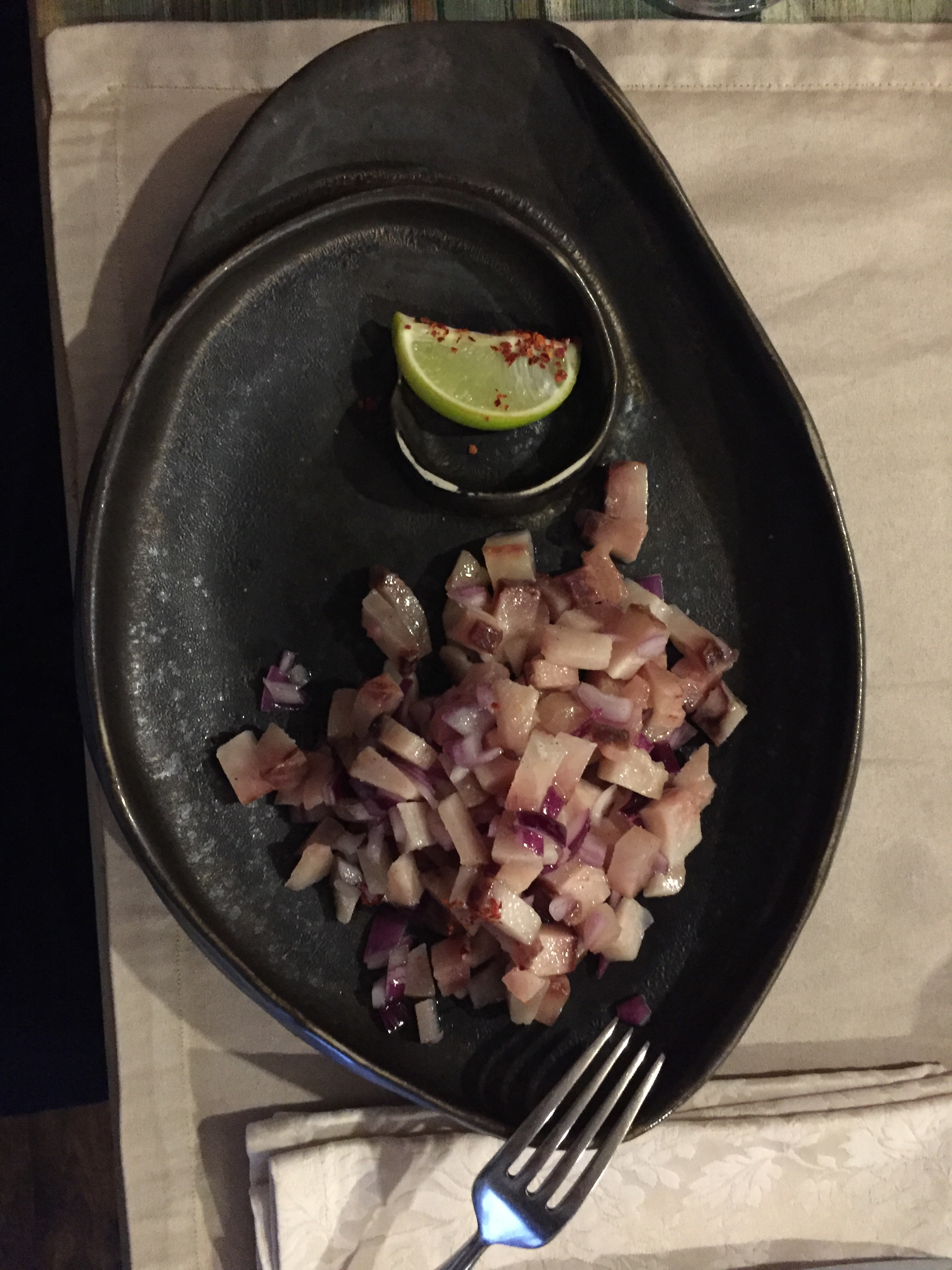
Indigirka is occasionally served with a slice of lemon or lime

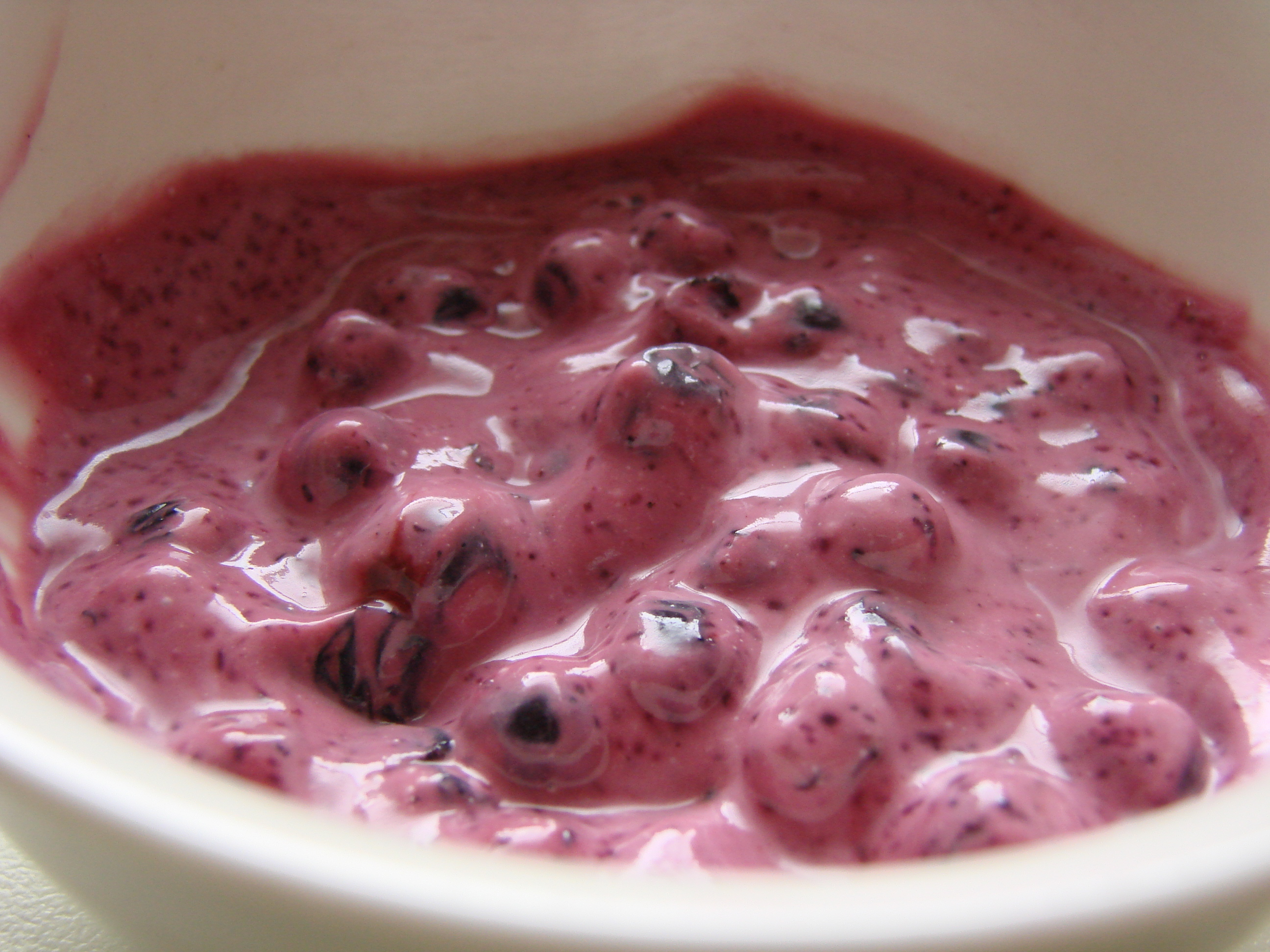
Kierchekh is a popular Sakha dessert

== History ==
Although cows could be milked only during the beginning of summer, dairy products historically made up the most important part of the Sakha people's diet. In addition to drinking milk, the Sakha also used it to make butter, curds, kumis, and suorat. Meat, which was prepared boiled and without salt, was a luxury and usually reserved for feasts. Only sick animals were slaughtered and it was often consumed ceremonially.

The Sakha also relied heavily on foraged goods. Traditionally, the Sakha ate pine sapwood, which was ground and then mixed with milk to form a sort of flour. Women gathered wild onions, berries, wild garlic, lilies, and various roots.

Russia brought with it bread, sugar, tea, vodka, and cultivated grains. Mushrooms were consumed as food only after the arrival of the Russians, being previously used for only hallucinogenic purposes.

Sakha chef Innokenti Tarbakhov (Иннокентий Тарбахов) started collecting and promoting traditional recipes and foods as early as the 1960s and has published numerous books on the subject. He's also said to have developed the famous Indigirka salad with frozen fish cut in cubes and dressed with salt, pepper and onion, with caviar topping on a special occasion.
