= Yakutian knife =

Traditional Yakut knife

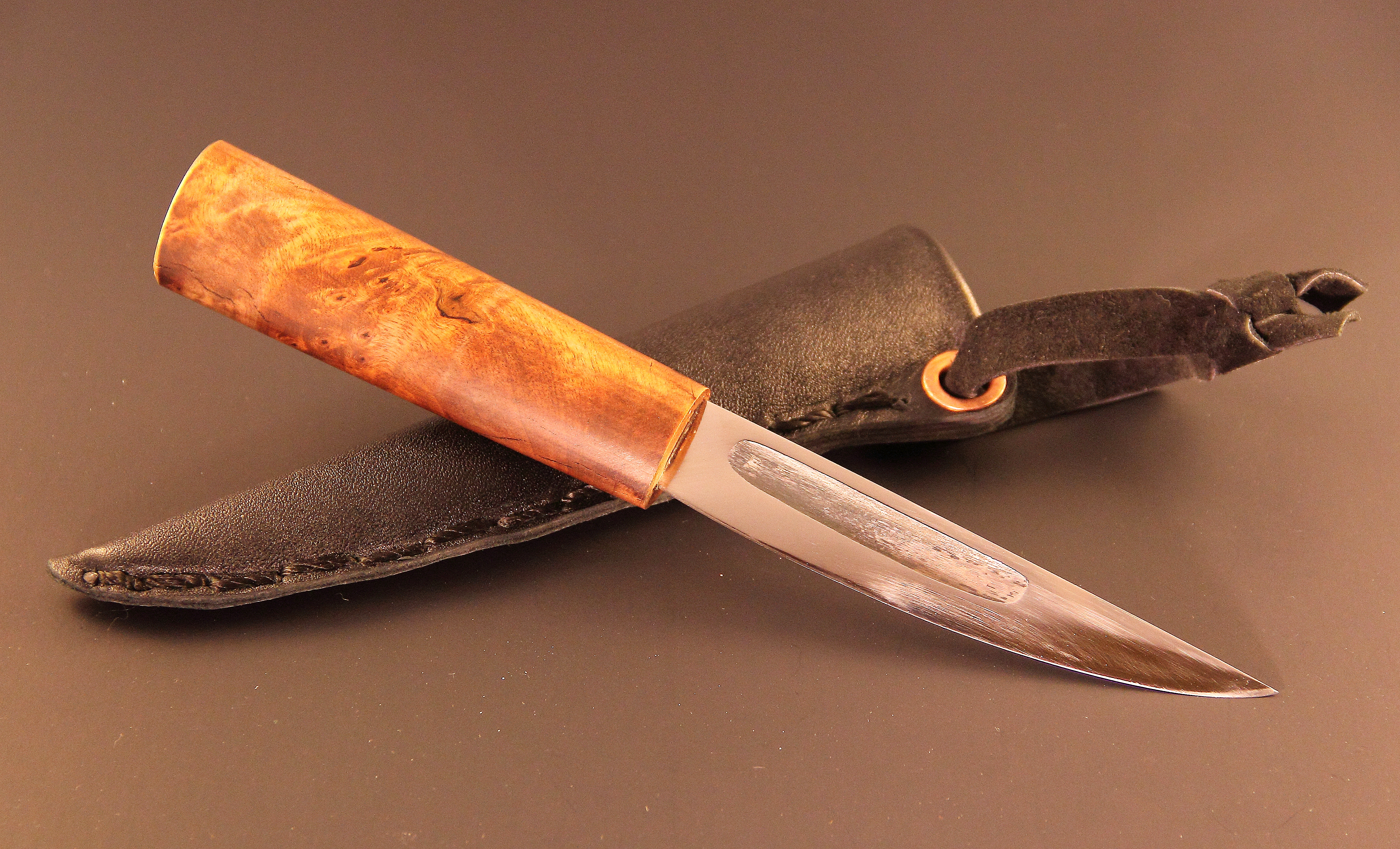
A modern Yakutian knife with birch burl (burr) handle and leather sheath.

The Yakutian knife (Yakut: саха быһаҕа, romanized: saxa bıhağa), sometimes called the Sakha knife, is a traditional knife of the Yakuts (an ethnic group from the Sakha Republic (or Yakutia), region of Siberia), used for working with wood, hides, skins, fish and meat or for combat. The knife has been used in Yakutia for hundreds of years without significant changes in its design.

Typical Yakutian knives have a blade length of 4–7 inches (10–18 cm), and 1–1 1/2 inches (2.5–3.8 cm) wide. An unusual feature of this knife is that the blade is asymmetrical; one side of the blade has a fuller, that is a groove in it and a chisel grind, while the other side has no groove and is basically a convex edge (meaning it rounds down to the edge, rather than having a straight bevel). The blade is traditionally forged from locally sourced iron ore smelted by Yakutian blacksmiths. The groove in the blade makes it lighter and allows the blacksmith to reduce the amount of metal needed to make larger knives. The knife handle is historically made from birch burl and is thick and egg-shaped in cross-section. It fits the hand and can also be used wearing gloves. The birch also protects the hand from the cold effects of the knife steel in extreme cold, a common condition in Siberia during winter months. A cow tail knife sheath completes the ensemble.

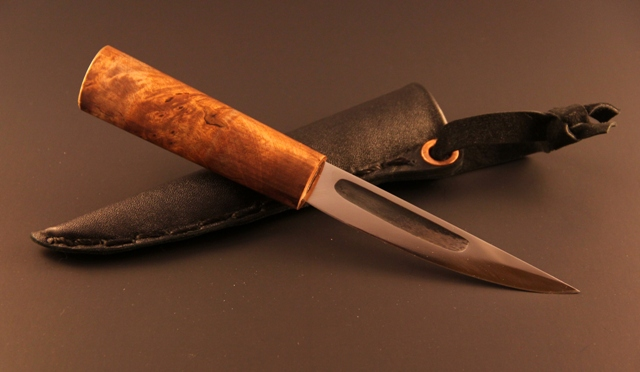
Modern Yakutian knife and its leather sheath.

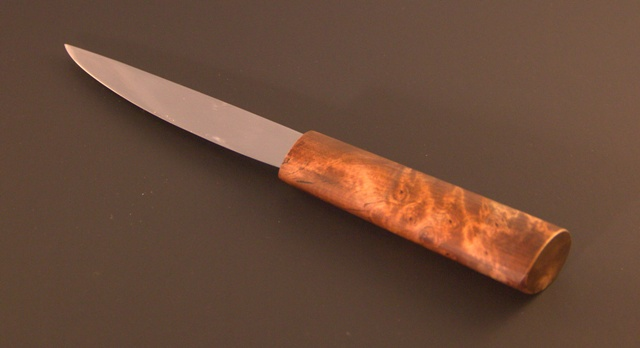
Yakutian knife with birch burr/burl handle. Left side.

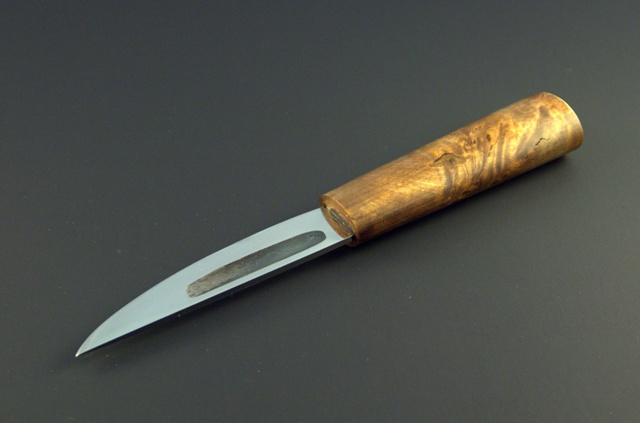
Modern Yakutian knife's right (groove) side.

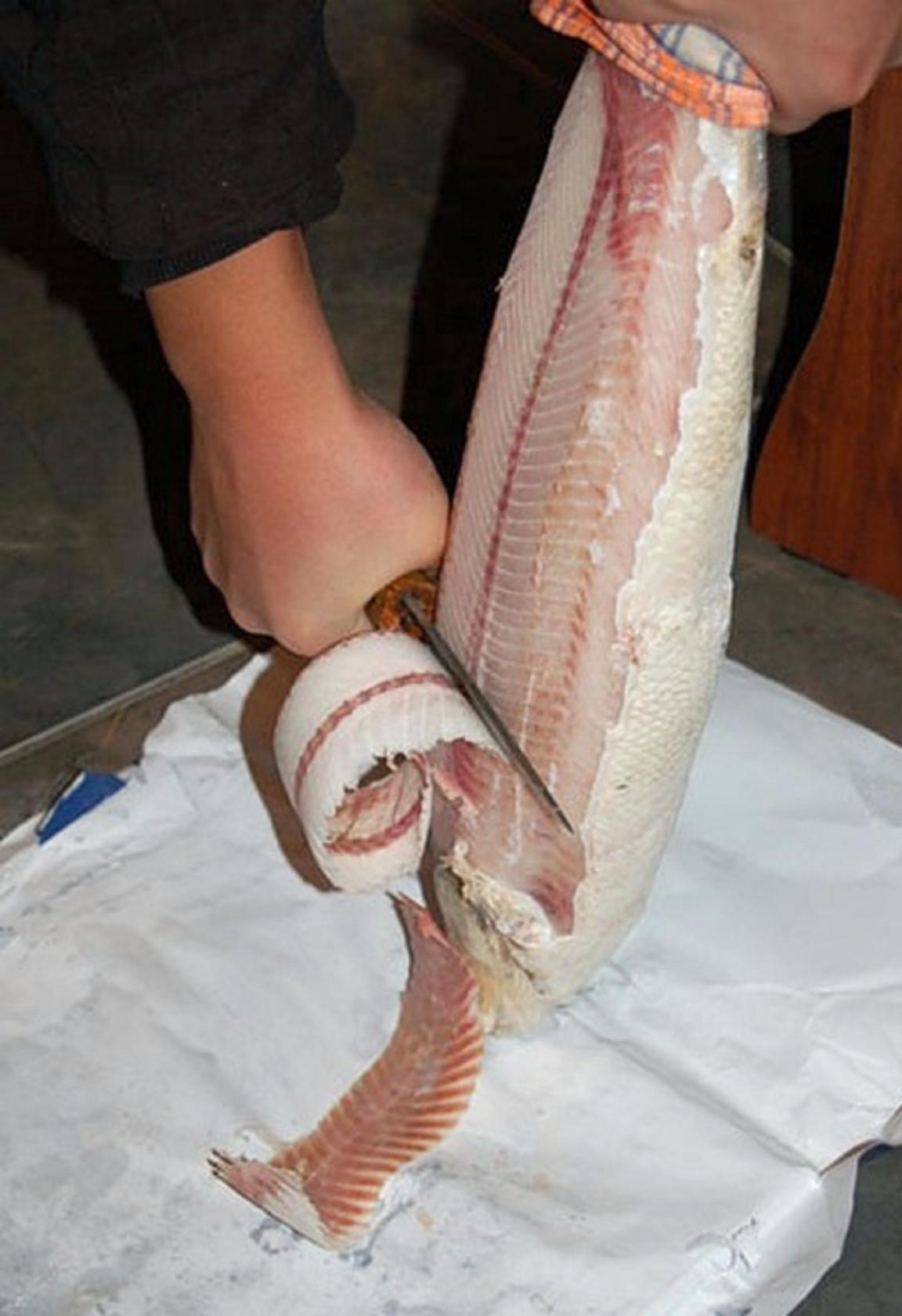
Whittling off stroganina with Yakutian knife.

== Knife variations and properties ==
Archaeological excavations carried out on the territory of modern Yakutia show that samples of knives, extracted from various burial grounds and sites of ancient man, have an undeniable similarity with Yakut knives.

There are many regional variations of the Yakut knife, but the classic version of the knife is a blade from 110 to 170 mm long, mounted on a wooden handle made of birch or birch burl with a leather sheath.

== Blade ==
The blade of the Yakut knife is sharpened, has a cutting edge on one side and a straight (or almost straight) spine. A distinctive feature of the Yakut knife is the asymmetrical sharpening of the blade, noted by the first researchers of the life of the Yakuts. On one side, the blade of the knife is flat, has a fuller (if you look from the spine, then the right side of the blade). The opposite (left) side of the blade is curved. This is done so that when working with the knife, the knife does not "dig" into the material. It is in this regard that knives differ for right-handed and left-handed people. For left-handed people, knives are made with a mirror-inverted asymmetry of the blade.

Knives are classified by blade length:

- 80-110 mm - small knife ( byhychcha ). Usually made for children or women
- 110-170 mm - knife ( byhah ) - the most common form
- 170 - a large knife ( khotokhon - from the Yakut khot - "to win") - practically a combat weapon, and therefore is rarely made
- There is also a variation called “batiya” - a sword or machete, 500 mm long, with a curved blade with the same asymmetrical sharpening, mainly used as an ice pick and for hunting bears.

According to the blade width, there are tundra knives, which have a narrow blade, and taiga knives (alasny), which have a wider blade. In the tundra, the knife is mainly used for cutting or drilling, and in the taiga, for cutting up game and livestock or working with wood. This explains the difference in blade width.

Traditionally, a working Yakut knife has a blade made of fairly soft steel. Soft steel is dictated by practical considerations so that the knife can be sharpened in the field on river pebbles or other material. Recently, Yakut knives with blades made of special grades of steel or even damask steel have become widespread.

The origin of the fuller on the blade raises many questions among various researchers. There are various versions, starting from the fact that the fuller is needed for blood flow, that it is a tribute to the traditions when knives were made of bone, that the fuller facilitates convenient cutting of frozen meat due to the smaller contact area, that the fuller is needed to give rigidity to the blade, that the presence of the fuller is the result of the peculiarity of forging an asymmetric blade, or that the fuller is needed to reduce the weight of the blade so that the knife does not sink.

== Handle ==
The knife handle is traditionally made of birch burl soaked in special oil. The knife handle is shaped like an egg in cross-section, with the "sharp" end pointing towards the blade, and is devoid of any stops; the guard is a simple straight handle. Its length is 130-150 mm, which is longer than the width of a man's palm. The long handle is explained not only by convenience, but also by the fact that the knife should not sink in water. In addition to birch burl, pieces of birch bark are also used, which are placed on top of each other (they can be immediately put on the tang of the blade) and coated with glue between the layers. After gluing, the birch bark blank is dried under a press, and then the handle is made from it. Knives with a handle made of mammoth bone or plastic are souvenirs and are not used in everyday life.

== Sheath ==
The sheath is also original in the Yakut knife. In the classic version, the sheath is made from a stockinged bull's tail, inside which there is a wooden insert that should not tightly grip the blade. The function of the insert is not to hold the knife, but to protect the blade from breakage. The holding function is performed by the leather part of the sheath, since the knife is sunk into the sheath by 2/3 of the length of the handle, so that the sheath fits tightly to the knife handle. Sheaths can also be made from ordinary sewn leather or birch bark. Wooden sheaths are extremely rare.

To carry the knife, a leather cord is usually attached to the sheath.

== Wearing and using ==
The knife is usually carried on a free hanger on the left side. The free hanger is needed so as not to interfere with the owner's movements. When carrying the knife on the left, it is convenient to pull the knife out with one right hand, resting on the base of the sheath with the thumb.

In Soviet times, the manufacture and carrying of a Yakut knife was de jure prosecuted by law, although the prosecution was largely formal. Note 1 to Article 182 of the Criminal Code of the RSFSR as amended in 1926, as well as in later years in similar articles, indicated that carrying a bladed weapon (hunting knife, dagger) as an accessory to a national costume or worn by the fishing population of the Far North regions does not constitute a crime. De facto, there were no restrictions on carrying a Yakut knife in Soviet Yakutia.

Nowadays, the production, sale, wearing and storage of the Yakut knife is regulated by a special act of the government of the Republic of Sakha (Yakutia), according to which the Yakut knife is recognized as an integral part of the culture of the Sakha people, and its use in everyday economic life is permitted on the territory of the republic.

The Yakut knife is widely used in the daily household life of the residents of Yakutia: hunting, fishing, cooking, woodworking.

== See also ==
- Puukko, a Finnish knife
- Mora knife, a Swedish knife
- Sami knife
- Stroganina, a Siberian dish
