= Sami knife =

Knives of the Sami people

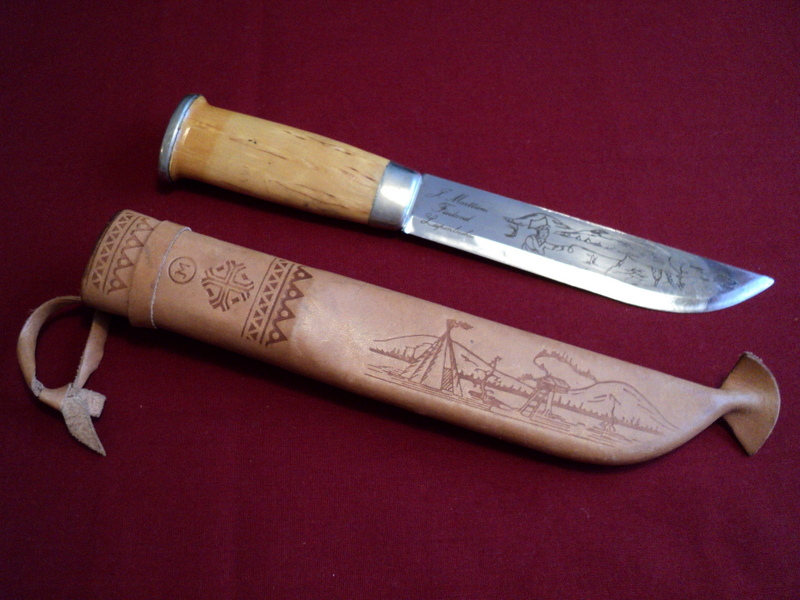
A Sami knife

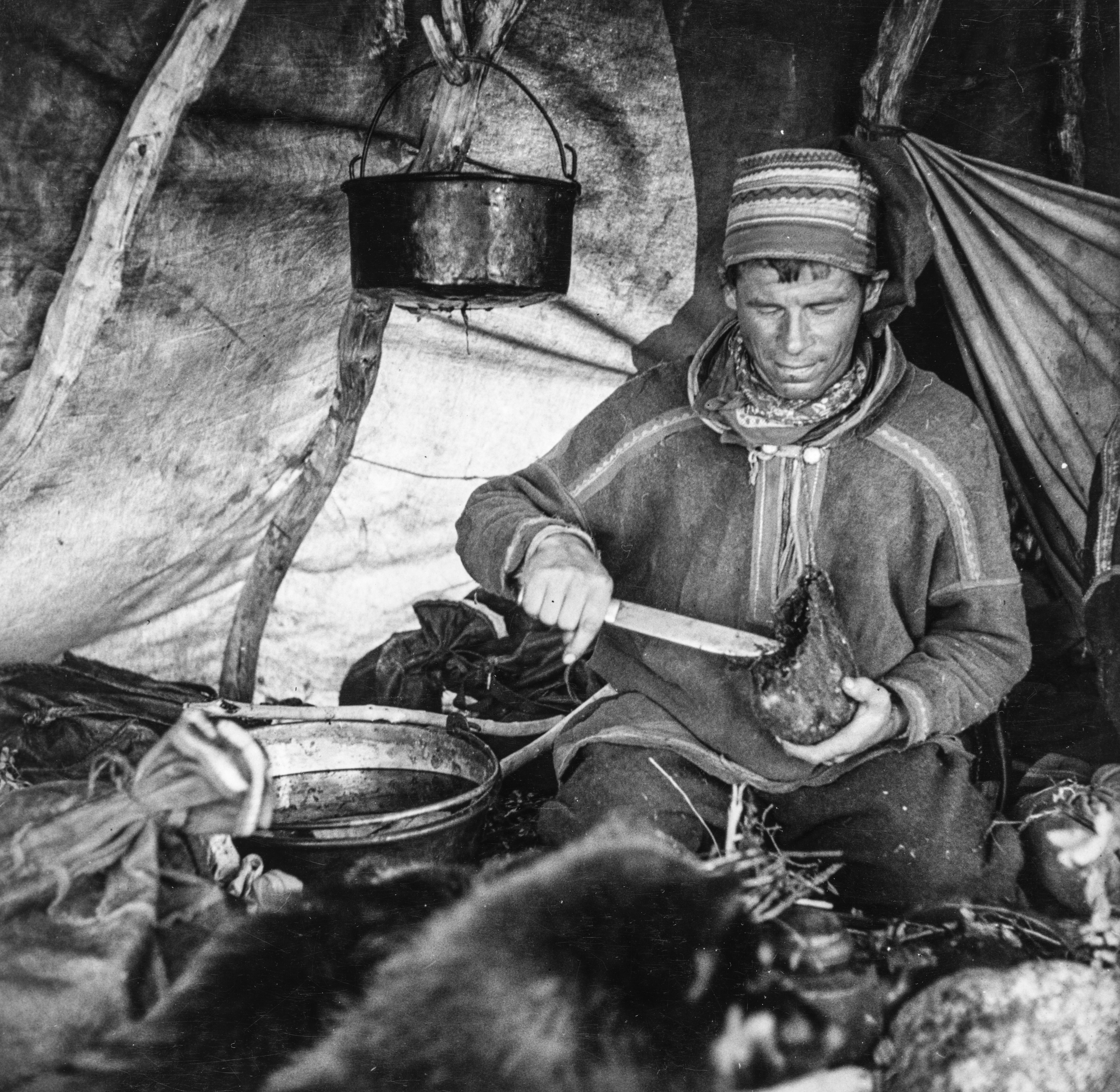
Sami man using his knife

The Sami knife (Skolt Sami: jõnn-neiʹbb, Inari Sami: stuorrânijbe, Northern Sami: stuorraniibi, all of which mean "big-knife", and Finnish: lapinleuku, leuku or lapinpuukko) is a large knife traditionally used by the Sami people.

== Uses and structure ==
The Sami knife has a long, wide, and strong blade that is suited for light chopping tasks such as de-limbing, cutting small trees for shelter poles (See lavvu), brush clearing, bone breaking and butchering tasks, and is sometimes used as a substitute for an axe for chopping and splitting small amounts of firewood from standing dead trees—an essential ability when all dead and fallen wood is buried underneath many layers of snow—or for combat. Typical Sami knives have a blade length ranging from 200 millimetres (7.9 in) to 450 millimetres (18 in).

The handle is generally made from birch for better grip when used in snowy conditions. This also provides good control over the blade, particularly when using draw strokes, which are preferred when handling the knife with gloves, or while the hands are numb. The tang runs through the handle. The handle has no crossguard. Traditional material for the sheath is reindeer leather.

The blade's edge often has a Scandinavian (or "Scandi") grind, i.e. a single flat bevel. The blade should be strong enough to split (reindeer) bones, and tempered to sustain low temperatures. Some Sami knives have fullers.

== Types ==
The Sami people typically use two knives: the smaller called a buiku, puukko, or unna niibaš ("small knife"); while the larger "Sami knife" is called stuorra niibi ("big knife").

== See also ==
- Puukko
- Yakutian knife
- Seax
