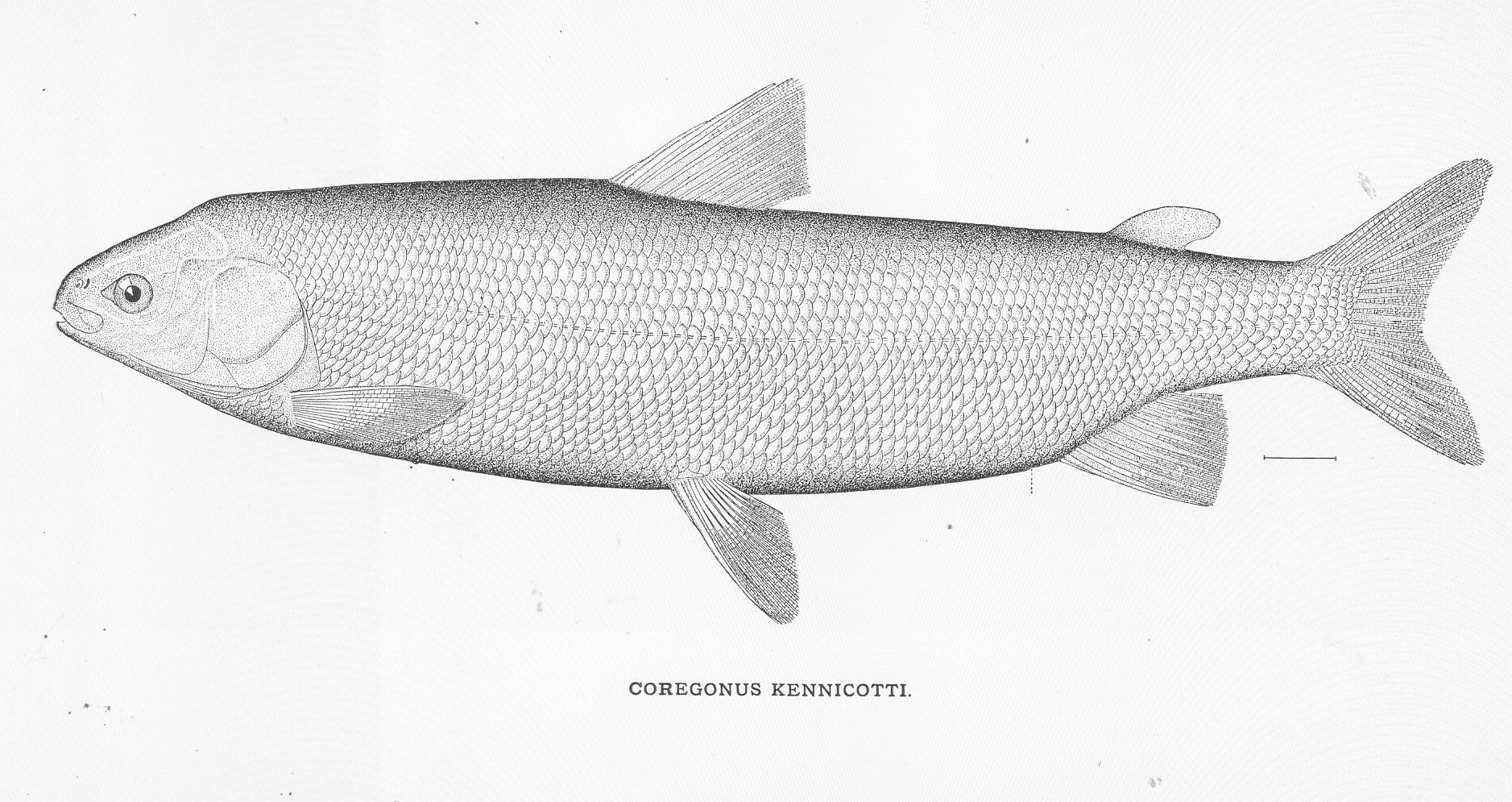

Conservation status
- Least Concern (IUCN 3.1)

Scientific classification
- Kingdom: Animalia
- Phylum: Chordata
- Class: Actinopterygii
- Division: Teleostei
- Order: Salmoniformes
- Family: Salmonidae
- Genus: Coregonus
- Species: C. nasus

Binomial name
- Coregonus nasus Pallas, 1776

Synonyms
- Coregonus kennicotti Milner, 1883

= Broad whitefish =

Species of fish

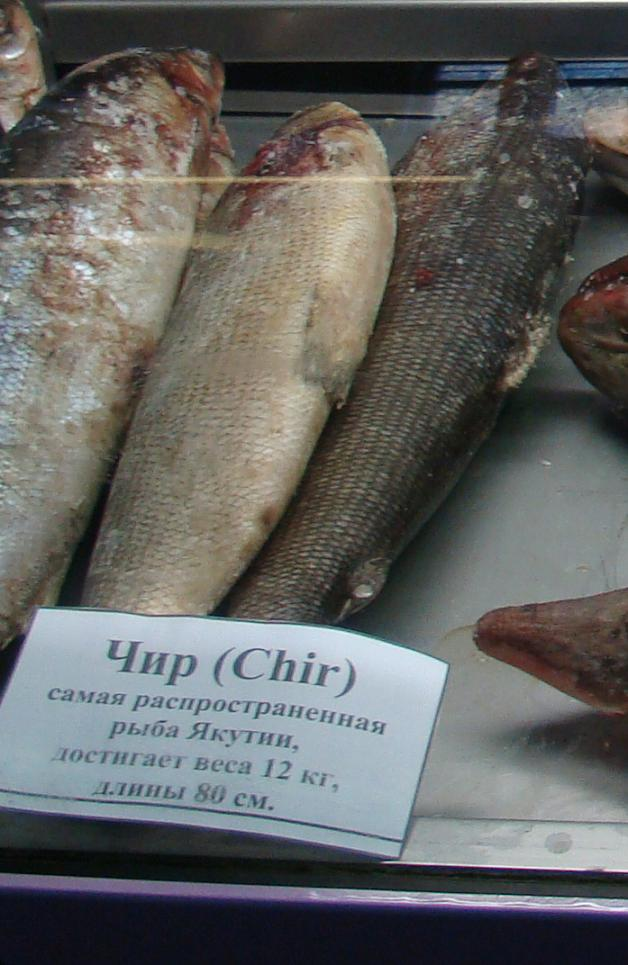
Frozen broad whitefish

The broad whitefish (Coregonus nasus) is a freshwater whitefish species. Dark silvery in colour, and like a herring in its shape. Its distinctive features includes: a convex head, short gill rakers, and a mild overbite. It is found in the Arctic-draining streams, lakes, and rivers of far eastern Russia and North America. Its prey includes larval insects, snails, and shellfish. It is eaten by humans and brown bears.

== Description ==
The broad whitefish is a herring-shaped fish with a more compressed body and convex head than other whitefishes. It is iridescent, with a dark olive-brown back, silvery grey sides, and a whitish bottom. Features that distinguish it from other species include a mild overbite and 18–25 short gill rakers. The fins of adults are grey, while those of young fish are grey. It reaches a maximum length of 70 centimetres (28 in), and a maximum weight of 16 kilograms (35 lb).

== Distribution and habitat ==
The broad whitefish is found in Arctic-draining basins in northern Eurasia and North America from the Pechora River to the Perry River. Most commonly inhabiting streams, it is also found in lakes and estuaries with a salinity of less than 15 percent. Fish from freshwater populations sometimes migrate to or through ocean waters, especially in the winter. It is nerito-pelagic, meaning that it is found in inshore open water. Throughout its range it is widespread and abundant, and there are no known threats to its survival, though it could potentially be threatened by overfishing, habitat destruction caused by oil exploration, and alteration of rivers. It has a number of genetically distinct forms in the various basins it occurs in. It has been stocked successfully in Belgium and unsuccessfully in Latvia, Ukraine, Estonia, China. An introduction has been made in Mining, Austria, where a rod and reel record fish was caught in 2002.

== Ecology ==
Recorded items in the broad whitefish's diet are chironomid midges, mosquito larvae, snails, bivalves, and crustaceans. It migrates upstream to spawn, except in some estuaries. These migrations are difficult for it, and many individuals become heavily scarred from infestations, lampreys, and fishing nets. It prefers streams with gravel bottoms, especially those with finer gravel, for spawning. After hatching, larval fish move downstream. In Russia, spawning occurs between July and November in various populations.

== As food ==
This fish is commonly consumed by humans, especially on a subsistence basis, and its good-tasting flesh is sold fresh, smoked, or dried. Also known as Chir, the broad whitefish is one of the species used in the Arctic Siberian dish stroganina.

It is also eaten by brown bears, especially when their preferred salmon is not available.

== Literature cited ==
- Alaska Natural Heritage Program (2005). "Coregonus nasus." Fishes Tracking List and Status Reports. Retrieved 10 February 2010.
- Barker, Oliver E., and Derocher, Andrew E. (2009). "Brown Bear (Ursus arctos) Predation of Broad Whitefish (Coregonus nasus) in the Mackenzie Delta Region, Northwest Territories." Arctic 62(3):312–316. Retrieved 15 February 2010.
- Freyhof, J. & Kottelat, M. (2008). "Coregonus nasus". IUCN Red List of Threatened Species. 2008 e.T5370A11124496. doi:10.2305/IUCN.UK.2008.RLTS.T5370A11124496.en.
- Froese, Rainer; Pauly, Daniel (eds.). "Coregonus nasus". FishBase. February 2010 version.
- Harris, Les N. (2008). "Population genetic structure of North American broad whitefish, Coregonus nasus (Pallas), with emphasis on the Mackenzie River system". Dissertation for the Degree of Master of Science. Retrieved 12 February 2010
- Machacek, Heinz. "Fishing World Records" Fishing World Records. Retrieved 18 February 2010.
- Page, Lawrence M., and Burr, Brooks M. (1991). A Field Guide to Freshwater Fishes Boston: Houghton Mifflin. ISBN 0-395-91091-9
- Reist, J. D.; R. A. Bodaly, R. J. P. Fudge, K. J. Cash, and T. V. Stevens (1987). "External scarring of whitefish, Coregonus nasus and C. clupeaformis complex, from the western Northwest Territories, Canada". Canadian Journal of Zoology 65(5): 1230–1239. doi:10.1139/z87-191.
