= Puukko =

Traditional Finnish outdoor universal knife

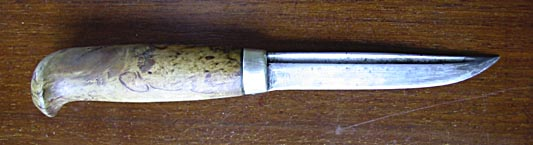
Traditional puukko with birch handle and full-length fuller

A puukko (Finnish pronunciation: [ˈpuːkːo]) is a small traditional Finnish general purpose belt knife with a single curved cutting edge, solid hidden tang, and usually, a flat spine.

== Design ==
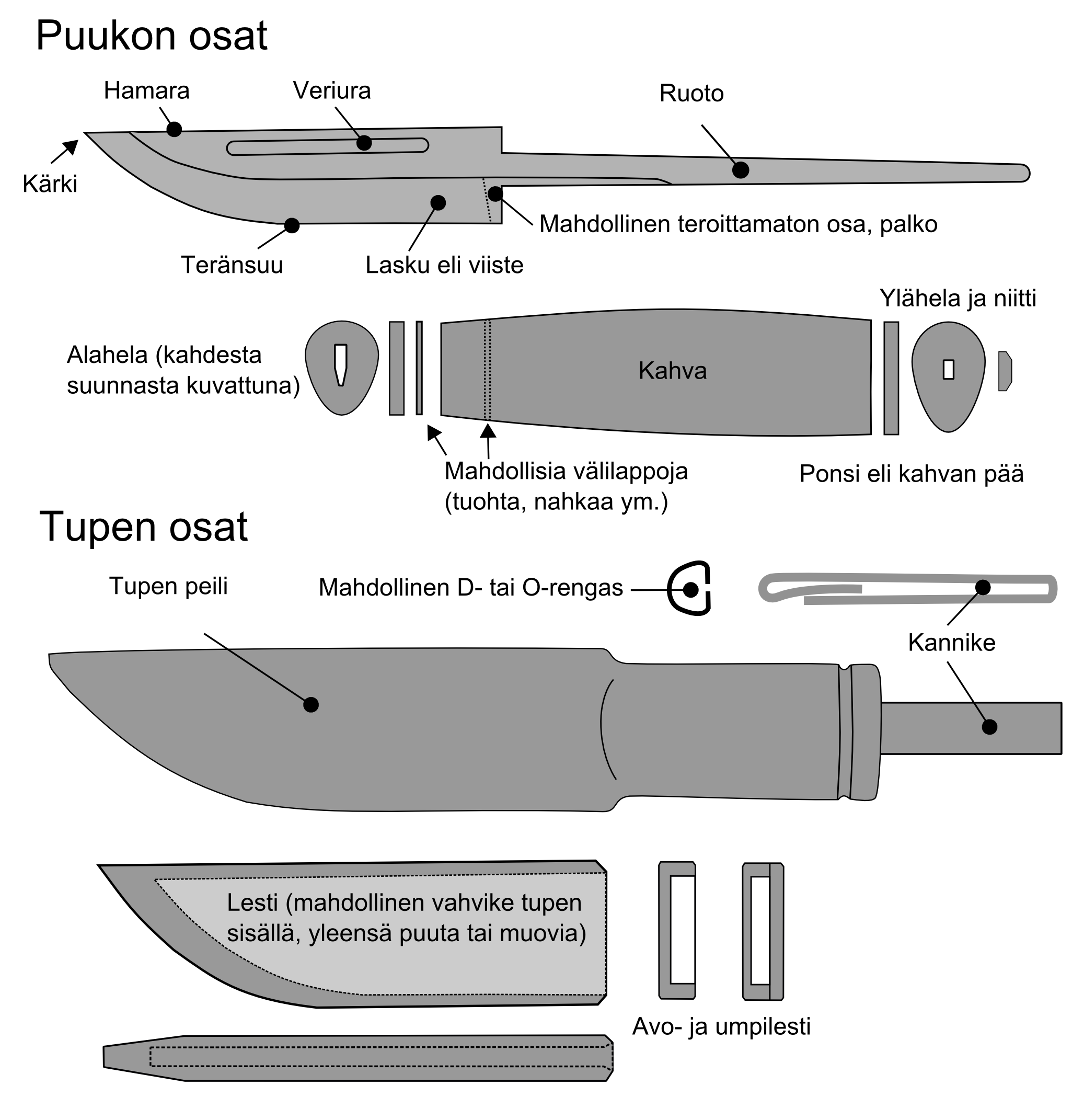
Knife and sheath parts

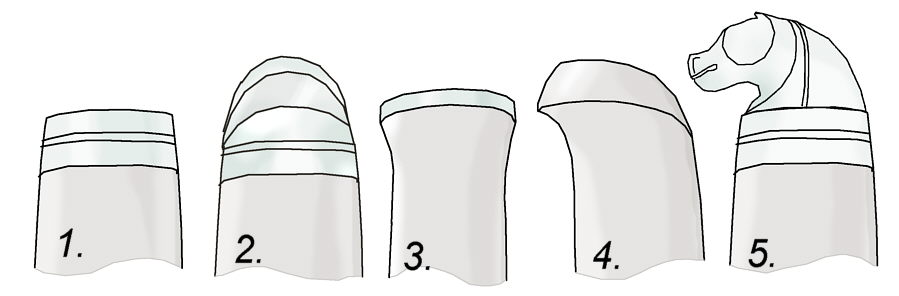
Different knife heads

The basic components of a puukko are a handle and a blade along with a sheath, which can usually be attached to a belt, but sometimes to a shirt or coat button. The blade is usually short, typically no longer than the handle and can often be less than 10 centimetres (4 inches).

The flat grind makes the puukko a natural choice for slicing, cutting and whittling, and the flat spine allows the user to use a thumb or the other hand to bring more force to bear on the task at hand. Puukkos are most often used as carving tools for decorative and fire-making purposes, and to clean fish and game.

Some puukko designs feature a slightly upward or downward curving point, depending on the knife's intended purpose. A hunting puukko's tip is often curved downwards, to make the skinning and gutting of an animal easier and less messy. Fishermen's puukkos sometimes have a small dovetail on the point to help in gutting a fish.

Most puukkos have a slight shoulder but no ricasso (an unsharpened section nearest the handle), because the point where the blade ends and the handle begins, is also the point where most power can be applied.

A puukko typically has no finger guard, as it is primarily used as a cutting tool. Where the knife and the hand are expected to get wet, such as when the puukko is intended for gutting fish or game, a form of guard is carved into the handle.

The traditional length of the puukko blade is the same as one's palm width, usually 90–120 mm (3.5–4.7 in). Carvers, huntsmen and leatherworkers favour shorter blades; woodworkers, carpenters and constructors longer ones. The blade of the historical väkipuukko ("strongknife") may be up to 500 mm (20 in). The väkipuukko more closely resembles a seax or short sword than a true puukko, although it has inspired the leuku of the Sámi people.

Both factory-forged and hand-forged blades may be laminated: a thin layer of very hard steel (traditionally crucible steel made from limonite iron) is sandwiched between two layers of softer metal, which makes the blade less brittle and facilitates repeated sharpening.

Before the 19th century, almost all iron in Finland was made from limonite on charcoal blast furnaces, which yielded very pure and high-quality iron suitable for crucible steel. German silver steel was and is a popular core-steel material. Today, both carbon steel and stainless steel are used. The blade can be lightened and strengthened by a fuller.

The traditional material for the handle is curly (masur) birch. Also great sallow root, birch bark, antler (especially elk and reindeer), scrimshaw and bone are used. Often, the handle is made from various materials between spacers. Today, however, industrially made puukkos often have plastic handles.

Making a quality pukko requires many different skills: including those of a bladesmith, a carver, a jeweller, a designer, and a leatherworker to make the sheath.

Some fine puukkos have blades of pattern welded steel, and forging a blade using crucible steel was considered the hallmark of a master smith.

Men's and women's puukkos do not significantly differ, except in size, as the size of a puukko handle should match the hand of its owner. Women's puukkos are often shorter, with more decorative sheaths, and are more oriented towards working with foodstuffs. Both boy and girl Scouts consider the puukko their scouting symbol, as well as a handy tool.

== Usage ==
=== Civilian use ===
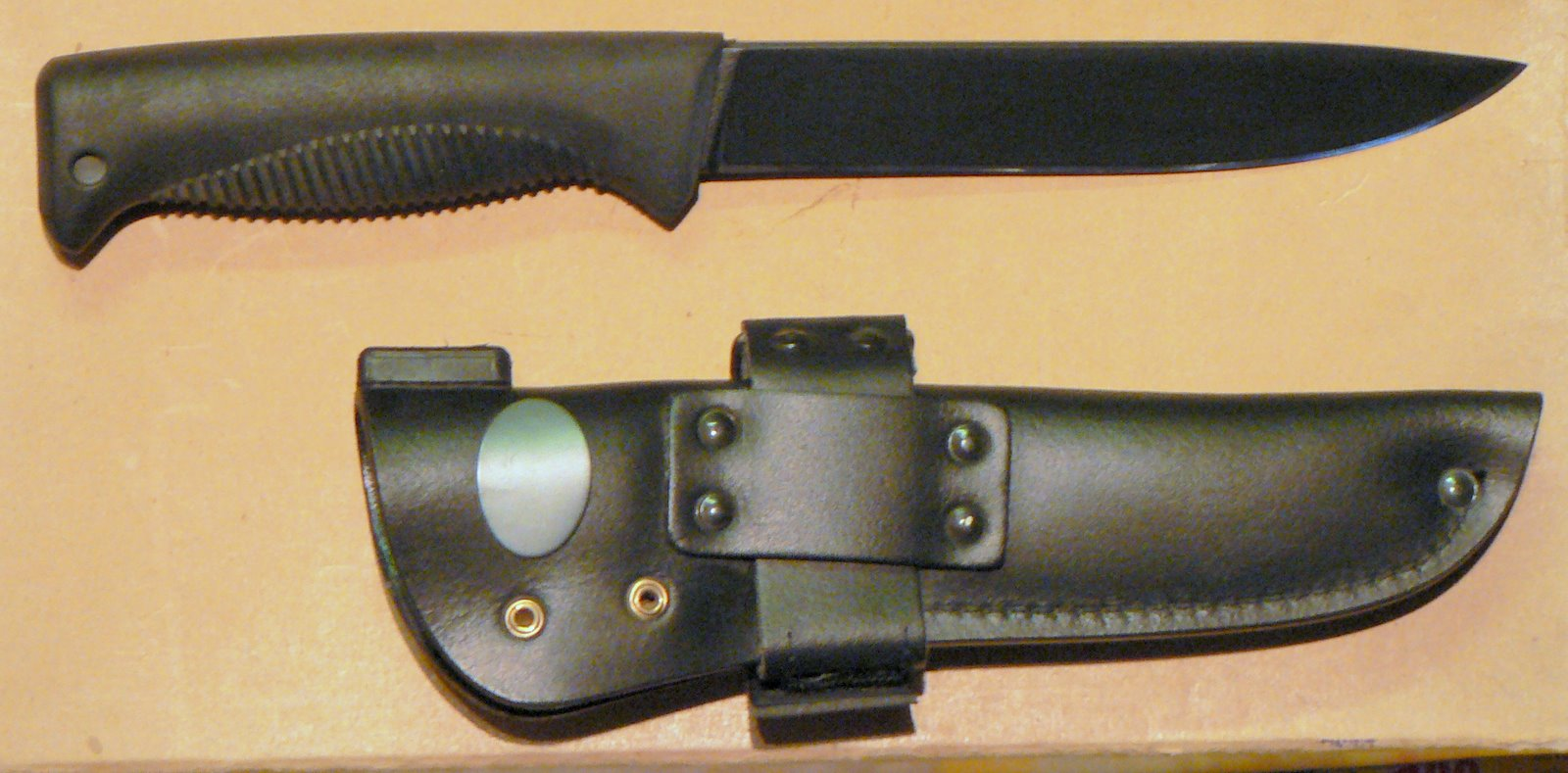
Modern "Sissipuukko" (Ranger / Commando Puukko) a puukko type field knife, for military use

In the Nordic countries, the puukko is an "everyday knife" used for everything from hunting, fishing, and gardening to opening boxes in a warehouse.

Many traditional puukkos are now manufactured on an industrial or near-industrial scale by many companies, Marttiini and Iisakki Järvenpää Oy being the most notable.

Carrying sharp objects which could be used as weapons on one's person was banned in Finland in 1977. Since then, the puukko has lost much of its visibility in public places and has been relegated to household work, hunting, and fishing.

In many industries, the mora knife, which has a much cheaper construction, is in use. The mora knife's handle is typically plastic, and the blade is either stainless steel or of laminated construction; harder steel, which forms the edge, is clad in softer steel. In Finnish, these knives are also usually referred to as "puukko" or "mora.“

=== Military carry ===
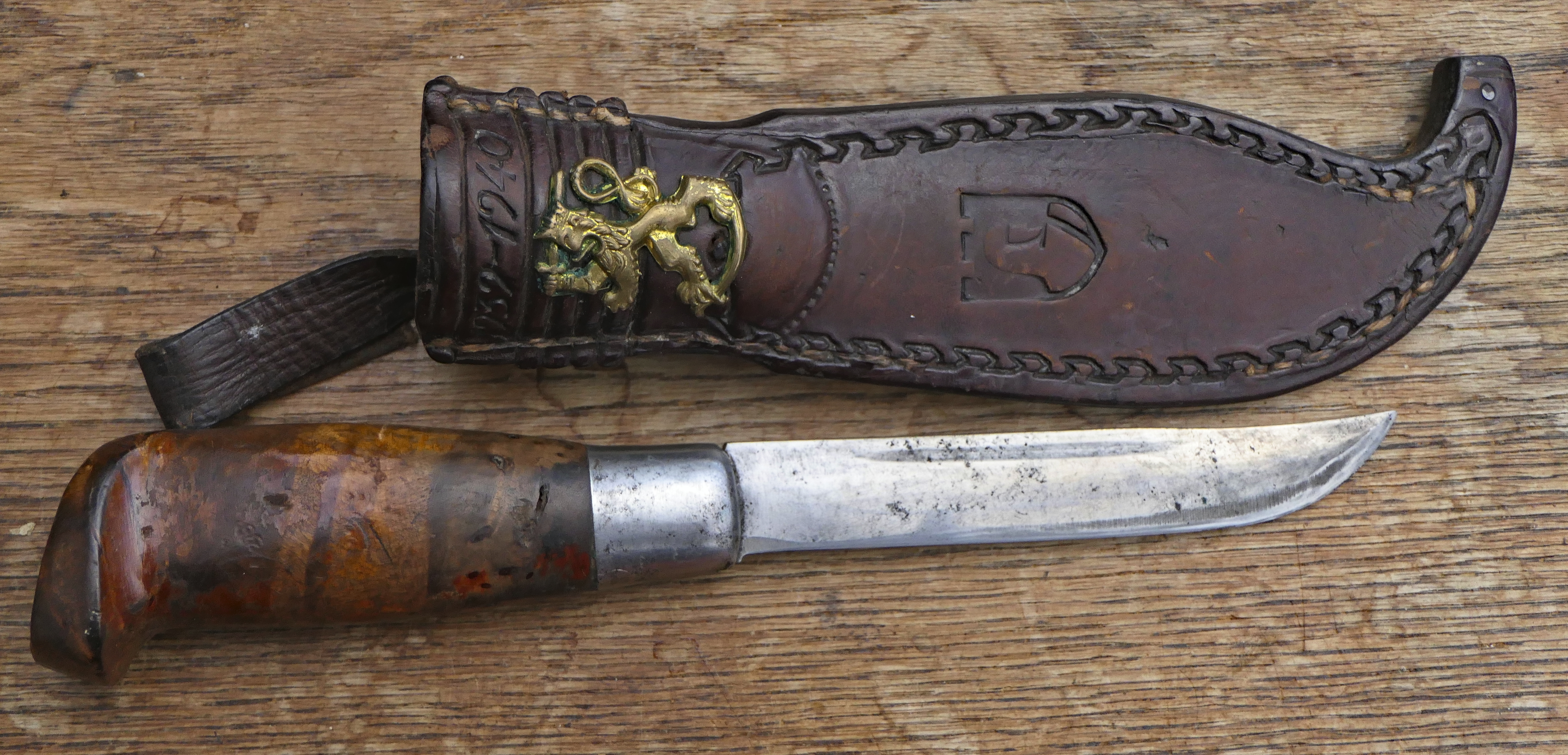
Puukko from 1939-1940

A puukko was traditionally the only civilian item that could be openly carried as a part of a soldier's combat gear without breaching the Finnish Defence Forces' regulations. A good puukko was considered an essential outdoorsman's tool, and thus vital for a soldier in the field.

Puukkos were effective close-combat weapons during the Winter War and Continuation War. The Defence Forces do not issue knives generally, as the puukko has traditionally been a personal item, and most conscripts continue the practice of bringing their own knives into service.

It is a custom of Finnish conscripts, especially non-commissioned officers, and officer cadets to carry a decorated and/or engraved commemorative puukko of their military school or training course as a part of their uniform, not unlike a commemorative dagger.

The bayonet of the Rk-62 assault rifle was designed to also function as a puukko, as was the rare bayonet for the M/39 Mosin-Nagant.

=== Criminal activities ===
Military models of puukko were popular in the Russian criminal underworld under the name "Finnish knife" or finka since the 20th century.

The modified version was among the models on which the Soviet military knife NR-40 was based and which was informally called "finka".

== Legality ==
In Finland, carrying a knife in public without an acceptable (usually job-related) reason is prohibited, and the only urban areas where open knife-carrying is an everyday sight are military garrisons. Although open carry is illegal, this is not vigorously enforced.

Construction workers often go to diners with a puukko hanging from their overalls, and in the rural and northern parts of the country, it is not uncommon to go shopping in village stores in hunting gear, including a puukko. For instance, the deep ecologist, ornithologist, and writer Pentti Linkola, who supported himself as a fisherman, often appeared in public wearing his puukko.

== Cultural legacy ==
In Finland and northern Scandinavia, many men take great pride in carving their puukkos' handles themselves.

Over generations, this knife has become intimately tied to Nordic culture and, in one version or another, is a part of many national costumes.

Tapio Wirkkala, a famous Finnish designer, designed a puukko for Gutmann cutlery.

The puukko has also given the root for the Finnish language verb puukottaa, "to stab (with a knife)" or literally "to knife".

== See also ==
- Sami knife
- Mora knife
- Yakutian knife
- Sgian-dubh
- Kaiken (dagger)
- Hori hori
- Kukri
- Swiss Army knife
