= Stroganina =

Siberian dish of sliced raw fish

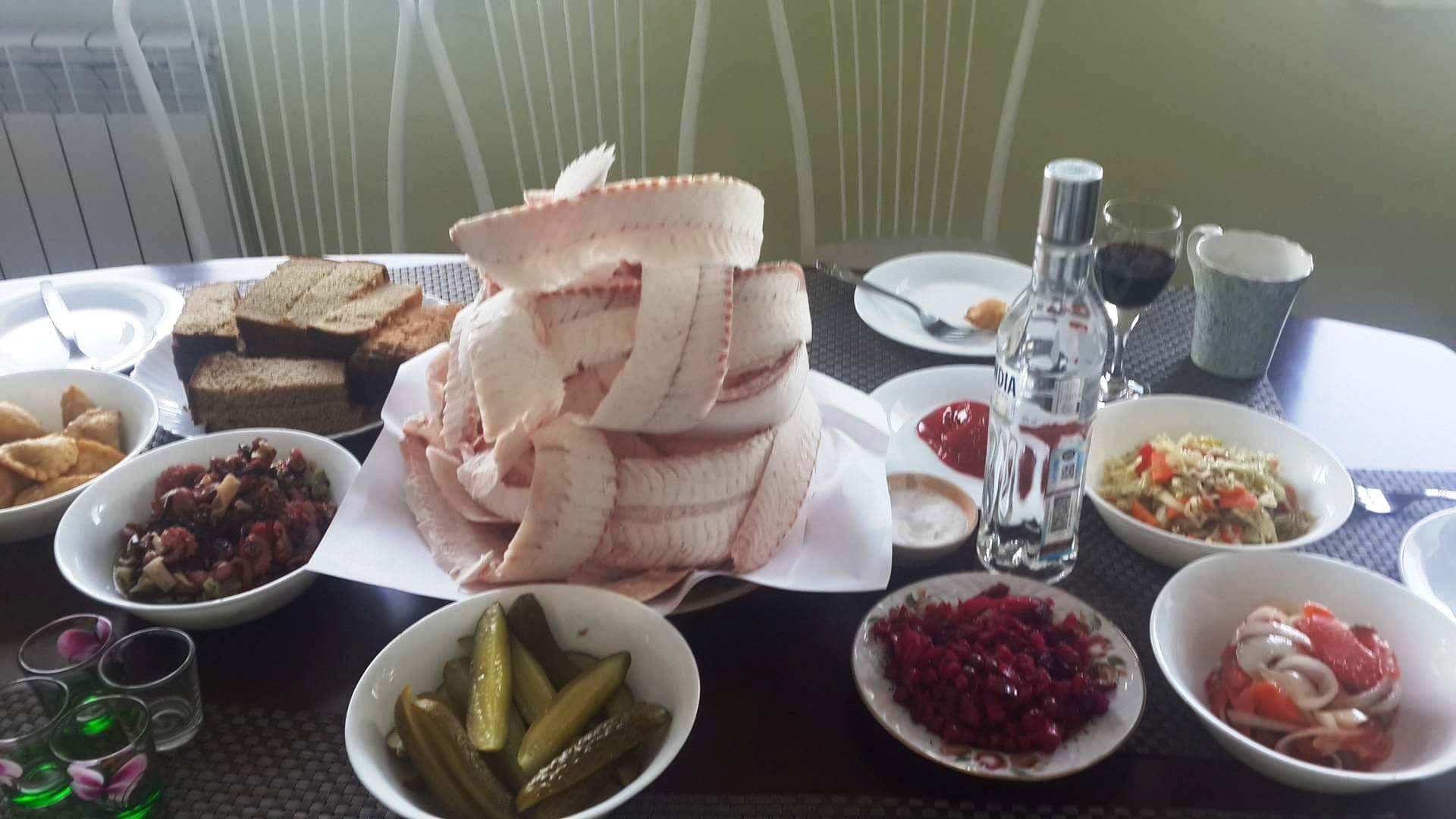
Prepared stroganina on a table

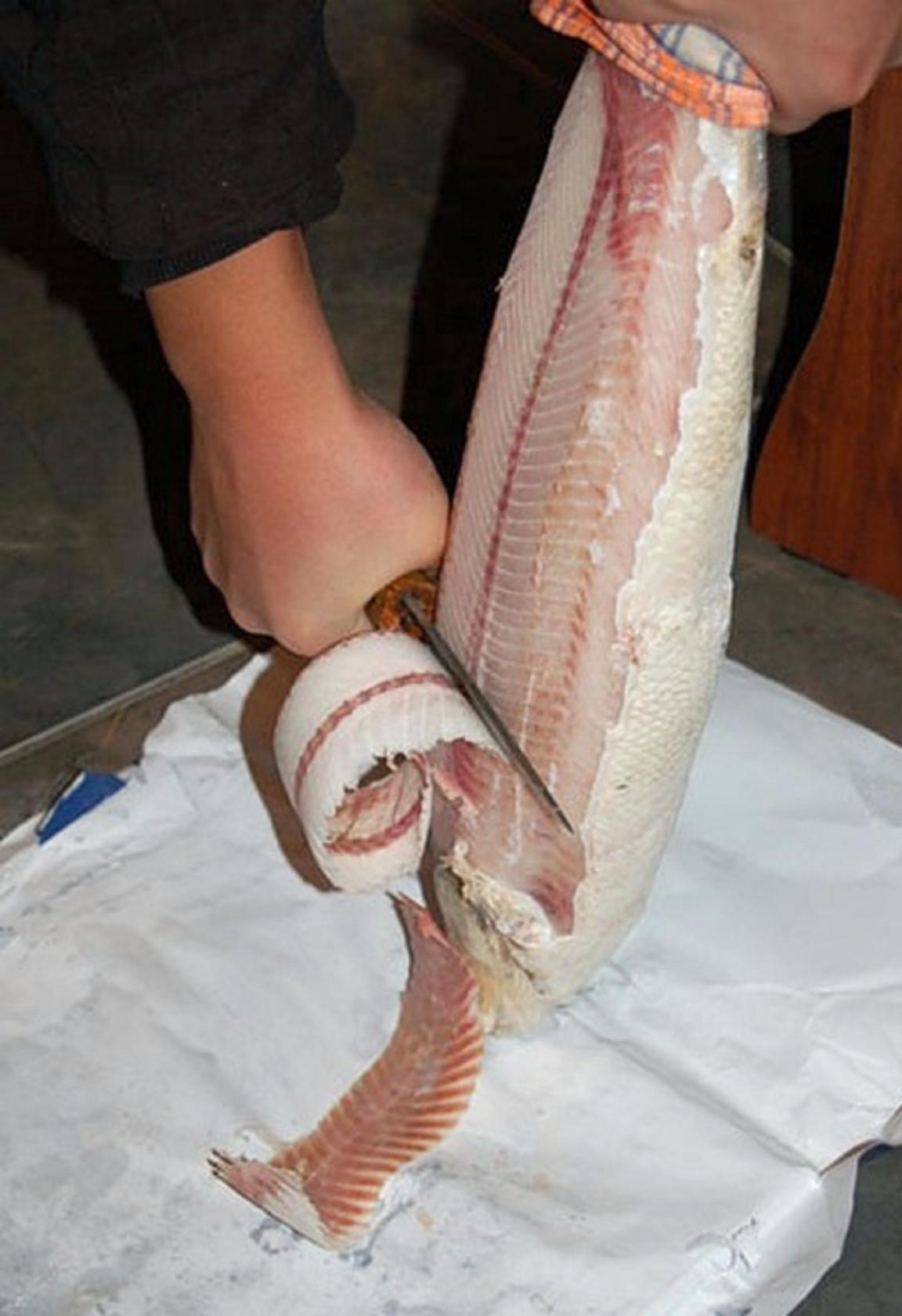
Whittling off stroganina with a Yakutian knife

Stroganina (Russian: строганина, literally "shavings") is a dish of the northern Russians and indigenous people of northern Arctic Siberia consisting of raw, thin, long-sliced frozen fish. Around Lake Baikal, the dish is referred to as raskolotka. Traditional stroganina is made with freshwater whitefish salmonids found in the Siberian Arctic waters such as nelma, muksun, chir, and omul. Rarely, it is made with sturgeon. This dish is popular with native Siberians, and is present in Yakutian cuisine, Eskimo cuisine, Komi cuisine and Yamal cuisine. In Kaliningrad it is made with Sarda.

== Ingredients and preparation ==
Frozen fish is used for the preparation of stroganina. The fish for stroganina is usually caught by ice fishing (Note: "Stroganina? The natives fish through ice, and their catch promptly freezes. In days gone by they simply shattered a fish against a rock and chewed the frozen shards with salt. Today the fish is shaved wafer thin and eaten frozen with salt, ...") during the late fall and fresh frozen in order to avoid the formation of ice crystals in the meat. Frozen fish can be glazed with near-freezing ice water in order to avoid dehydration and better-preserve the fish meat in a frozen state. The fish is typically frozen straight, without bending its body.

Before the preparation of stroganina, strips of skin are cut from the back and abdomen from tail to head. Vertical incisions are made in the flesh. The fish is placed head down on a hard surface and skinned. Thin slices of fish fillet are cut along the body using a sharp knife. The geometry of the Yakutian knife is best suited to cut long slices that will form ribbon curls. In order to keep the slices frozen as long as possible, the stroganina is served immediately on non-metallic frozen plates or in ice-cold bowls with salt and black pepper powder. It is usually eaten with the hands while still frozen.

== Variations ==
A variation of the dish is milky stroganina, which is prepared using stroganina and frozen fresh milk.

The name is also applied to stroganina from reindeer meat.

== In popular culture ==
The restaurant "Stroganina Bar" in Moscow, Russia, specializes in stroganina.

The city of Yakutsk holds festivals celebrating the local delicacy.

== See also ==
- List of raw fish dishes
- List of Russian dishes
- List of seafood dishes
- Hoe (food)
- Rui-be
- Sashimi
