= Suorat =

Suorat (Yakut: суорат, suorat) is a thick, Sakha yogurt which was traditionally the most common summer food in Sakha. By itself, it tastes of buttermilk, but various foraged products such as bilberries, sapwood, and roots were also added, in addition to bones which dissolved from the lactic acid. Suorat was traditionally kept in large birchbark vats, and was also stored in frozen slabs for winter consumption. It is made from the skim milk of cows after separating the crème fraîche.
