= Mora knife =

Small Swedish sheath knife

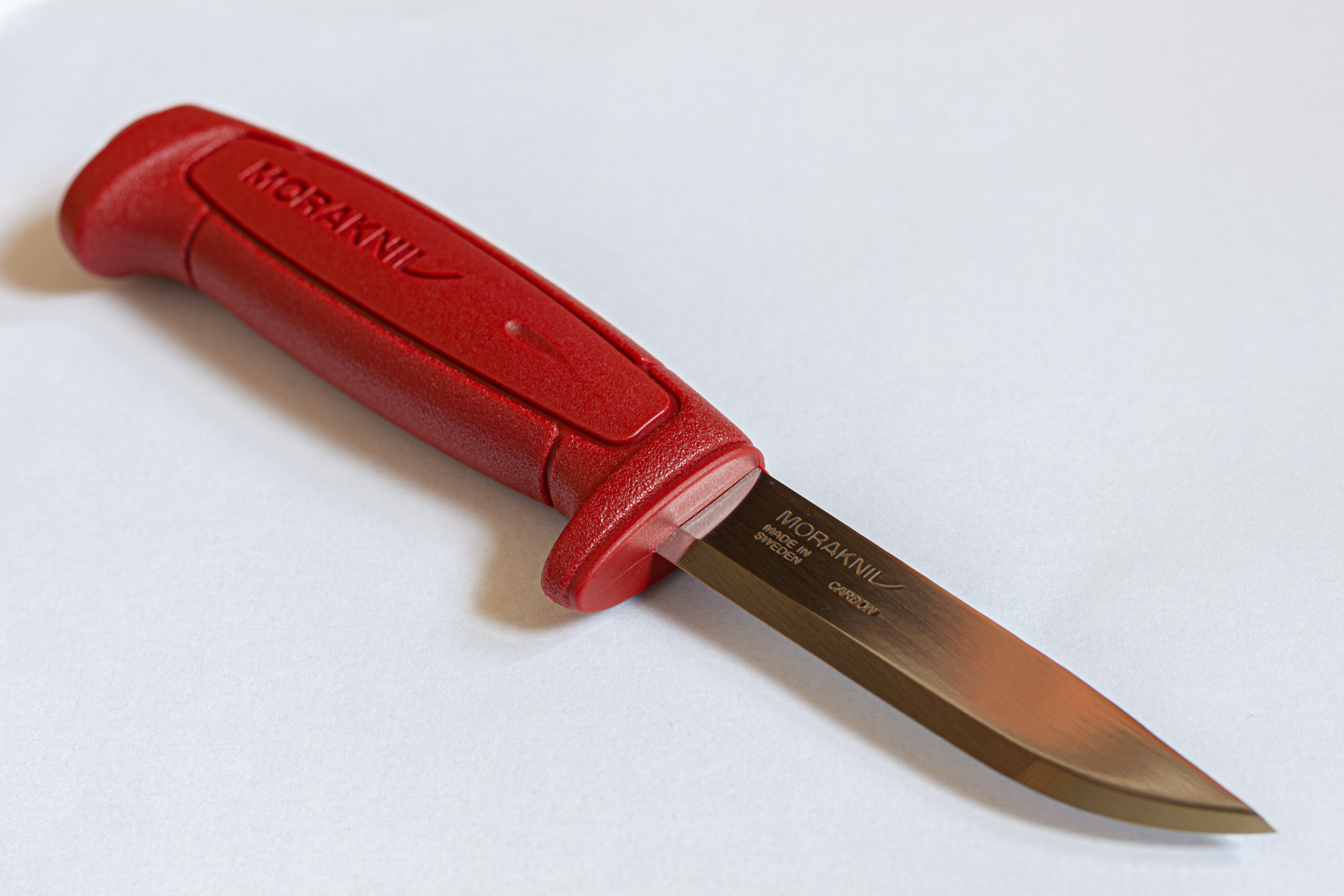
Morakniv Basic 511 Carbon Steel

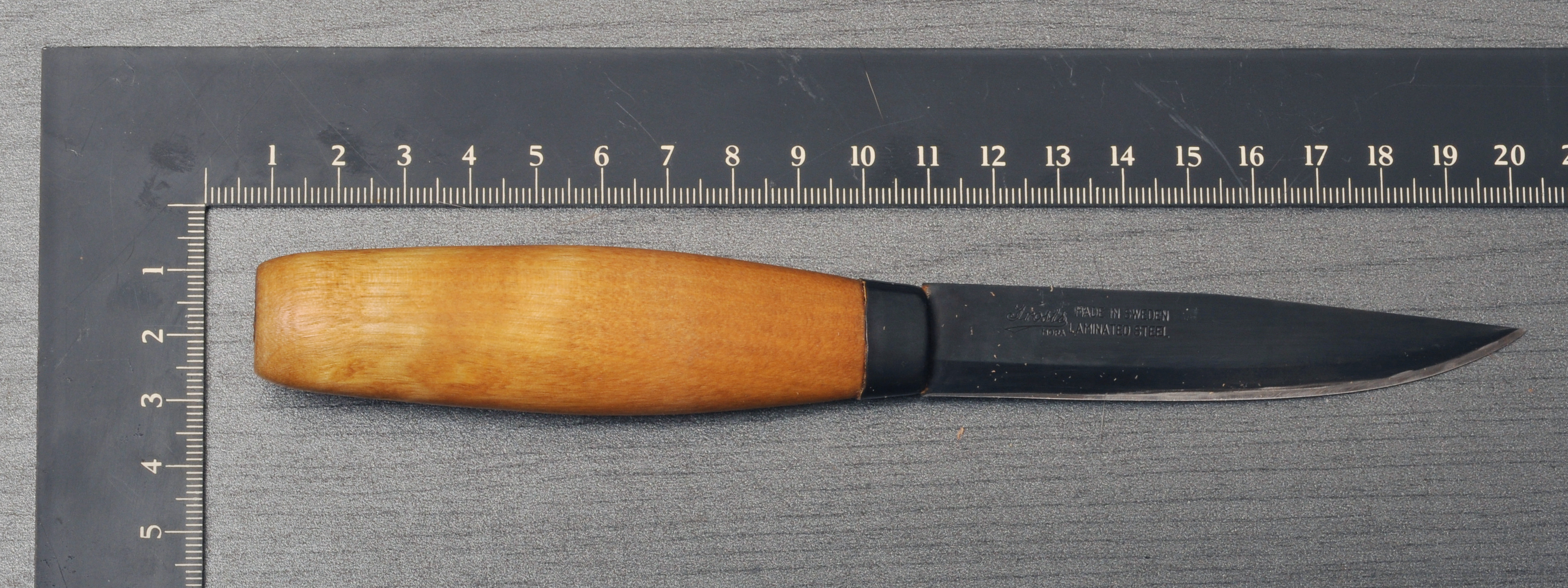
Classic style mora knife

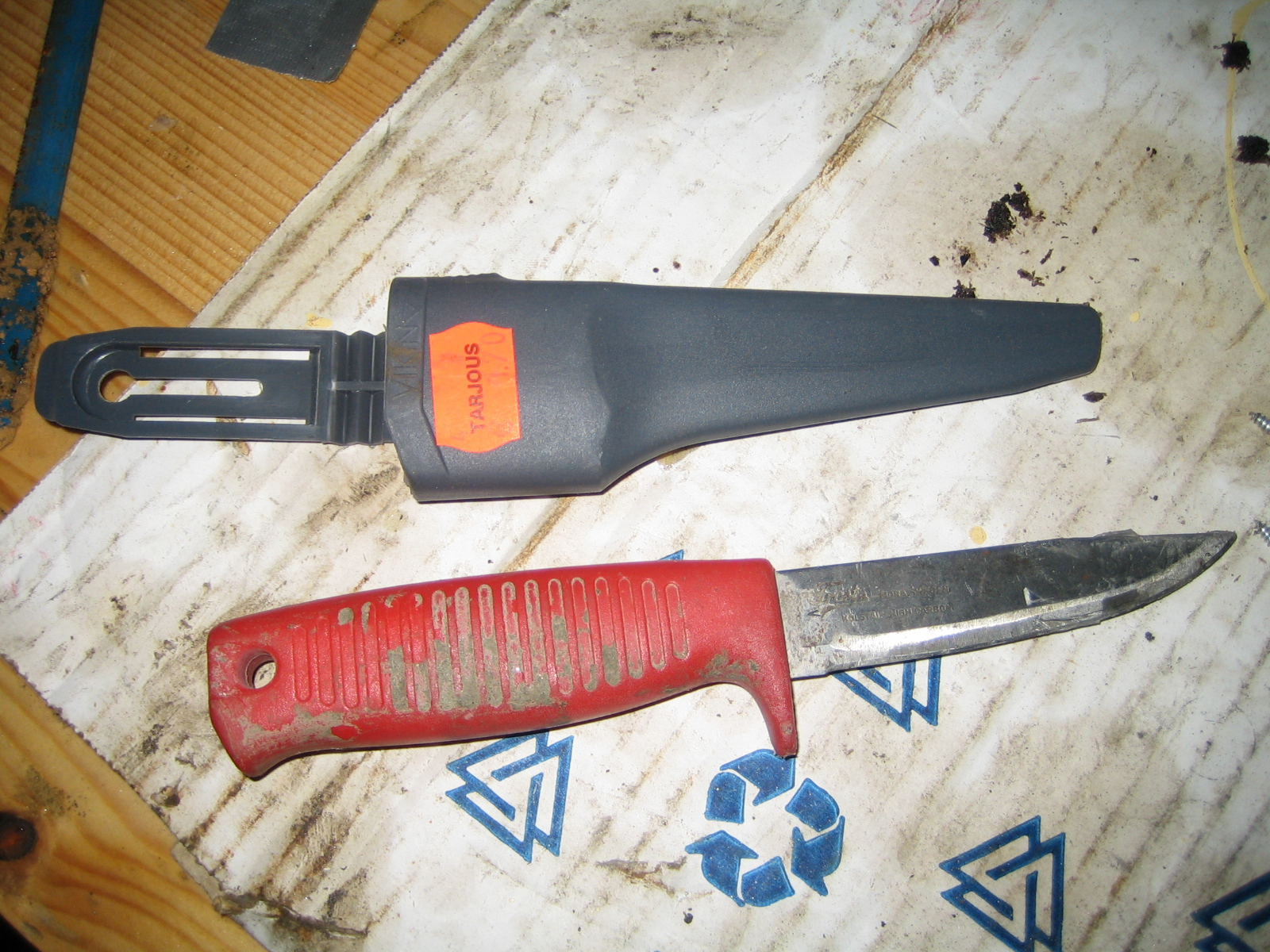
Modern mora knives are often used in construction work

A mora knife (Swedish: morakniv) is a small sheath knife. It is a fixed blade knife, with or without a finger guard. The term originates from knives manufactured by the cutleries in Mora, Dalarna, Sweden. In Sweden and Finland, mora knives are extensively used in construction and in industry as general-purpose tools. Mora knives are also used by all Scandinavian armies as an everyday knife. In Poland, Entire M has been the distributor of Morakniv products since 1991.

== Types ==
Mora knives were mostly produced by the KJ Eriksson and Frosts Knivfabrik (Frost's Knife Factory) companies; they merged their brands under Mora of Sweden, later renamed Morakniv, but a number of other knife-makers also make mora-style knives. The Morakniv company uses blades of 12C27 stainless steel, UHB-20C carbon steel, Triflex steel, or very hard (HRC 61) carbon steel laminated between softer alloyed steel.

Other manufacturers of mora-type knives are Cocraft a house brand of Clas Ohlson, Best Tools and Hultafors.

=== Some models ===
==== Morakniv ====
- Mora Companion MG High Carbon (replacement of the now discontinued 840 Clipper)
- Mora Companion MG Stainless (replacement of the now discontinued 860 Clipper)
- Mora Basic 511 carbon
- Mora Basic 546 stainless
- Mora Bushcraft Series
- Mora Kansbol
- Mora Garberg
- Mora Outdoor 2000

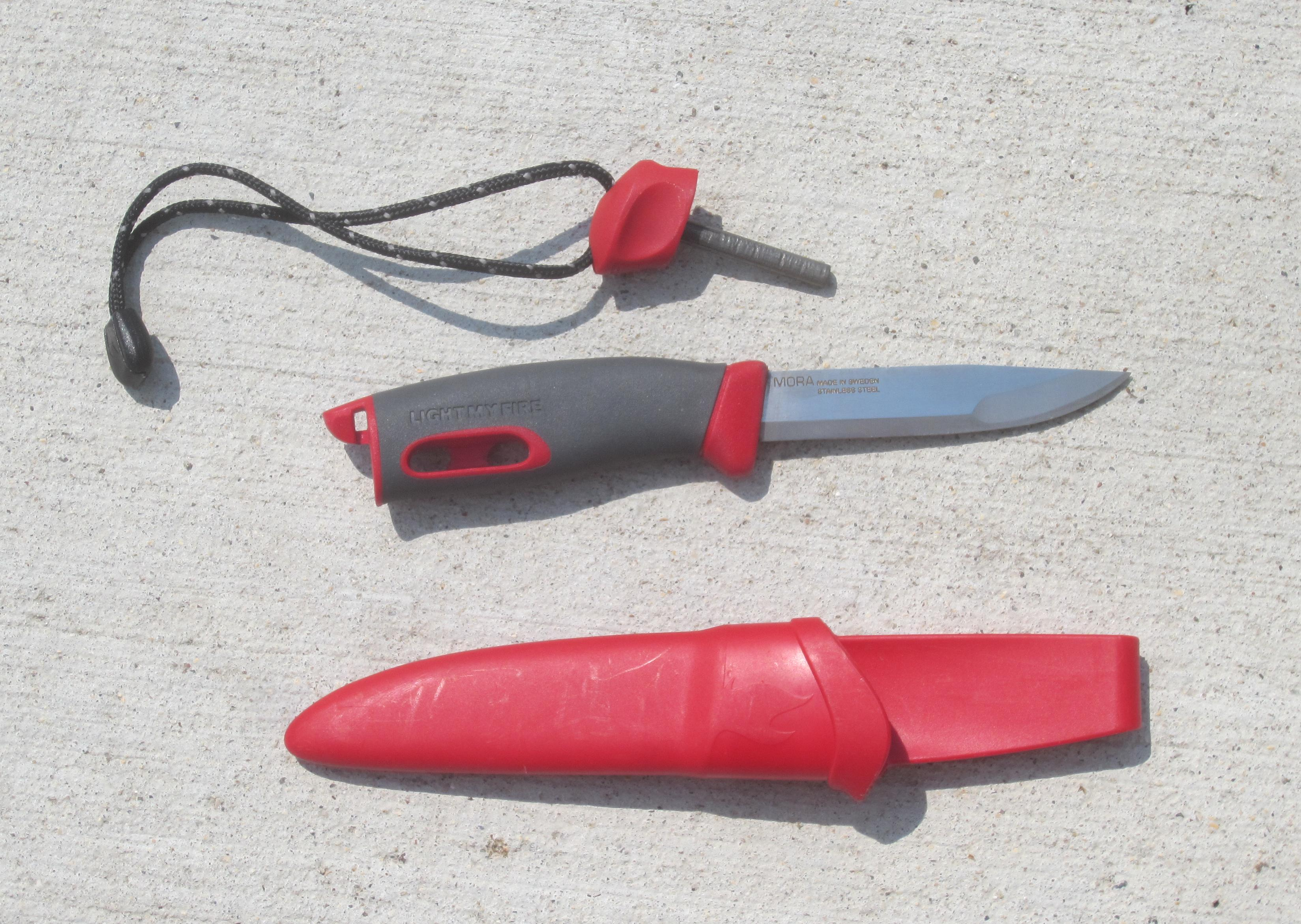
This Mora camping knife has a ferrocerium rod built into the handle, which can be scraped with the back of the knife blade to make sparks and ignite tinder. Blade length 3 5/8 inches (92 mm)

== See also ==
- Puukko
- Swiss Army knife
- Opinel
- EKA (knives)
- Mercator K55K
