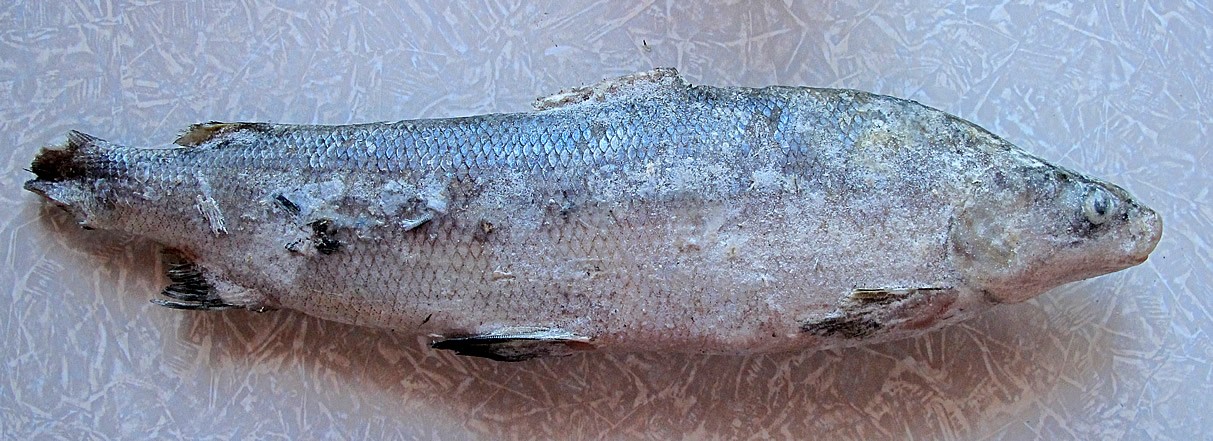
- Frozen muksun

Conservation status
- Least Concern (IUCN 3.1)

Scientific classification
- Kingdom: Animalia
- Phylum: Chordata
- Class: Actinopterygii
- Division: Teleostei
- Order: Salmoniformes
- Family: Salmonidae
- Genus: Coregonus
- Species: C. muksun

Binomial name
- Coregonus muksun (Pallas, 1814)

= Muksun =

Species of fish

The muksun (Coregonus muksun) is a type of whitefish widespread in the Siberian Arctic waters. It is mostly found in the freshened areas of the Kara and Laptev Seas and up the major rivers, as well as in Lake Taymyr.

Like all whitefishes, it is a silvery, fusiform fish. The average length of mature fish is 33 cm and weight of 1–2 kg, and it can reach a length of 75 cm and a weight of 7–8 kg. Depending on population, the muksun can live up to 16–25 years of age. It is valuable commercially as well as locally as a source of food.

== As food ==
Muksun flesh is a delicacy. It is white and tender with very few bones and is one of the species used in the Arctic Siberian dish stroganina.
