= Malosol =

Culinary term

Malosol or malossol (Russian: малосол, “lightly salted”) is a culinary term used in Russia and Eastern Europe to describe foods preserved with a low concentration of salt. The term is most widely associated with high‑quality caviar, but it also applies to lightly brined vegetables and mildly cured fish. In Russian, the word derives from malo (“little”) and sol (“salt”), indicating a minimal‑salt preservation method.

== Definition and etymology ==
In food preservation, malosol refers to a process in which ingredients are treated with a small amount of salt—below 5%, and often closer to 3%—sufficient to preserve freshness without imparting a strong briny flavor. This technique produces a mild, delicate taste and is intended for short‑term consumption rather than long‑term storage.

The term comes from the Russian малосол, meaning "little salt" (lightly salted). Its use in the caviar trade dates to the 19th century, when Russian producers developed low‑salt preservation techniques to improve flavor while maintaining freshness.

== Applications ==
Caviar
Historically, heavy salting was necessary before refrigeration, but improvements in storage allowed for lighter salting, beginning in 1820, making malosol the best method for premium caviar. The term is most commonly used in the caviar industry, where malosol designates roe preserved with minimal salt. Modern producers typically use 2.8–4% salinity to maintain the natural flavor and texture of sturgeon eggs. One source specifies 3.5%, and another, 3.7%, or a range such as 3–3.5%, although higher percentages can be used for certain applications and up to 5%. By comparison, salted caviar is up to 8%, and above that, up to 10%, is designated as payusnaya (also known as pressed caviar).

Fish
Lightly salted fish—such as salmon, trout, or herring—may also be described as malosol, indicating a mild cure that preserves the fish's fresh flavor. Although less documented than caviar usage, the term follows the same principle of minimal salting.

Vegetables
As an example, French cuisine use tiny cucumbers that are lightly brined. Often vegetables are additionally seasoned with dill, garlic and spices, and fermented briefly.

== Characteristics ==
In addition to low salinity, foods labeled malosol typically exhibit:

- Fresh, mild flavor
- Soft or delicate texture
- Short shelf life compared to fully cured or pickled products

In caviar production, the method involves carefully washing roe, adding a fine salt solution, and chilling it briefly to achieve minimal salt absorption.
